= List of Desidae species =

This page lists all described genera and species of the spider family Desidae. As of November 2024, the World Spider Catalog accepts 324 species in 63 genera:

== A ==
=== Akatorea ===
Akatorea Forster & Wilton, 1973

- Akatorea gracilis (Marples, 1959) (type) — New Zealand
- Akatorea otagoensis Forster & Wilton, 1973 — New Zealand

=== Amphinecta ===
Amphinecta Simon, 1898

- Amphinecta decemmaculata Simon, 1898 (type) — New Zealand
- Amphinecta dejecta Forster & Wilton, 1973 — New Zealand
- Amphinecta luta Forster & Wilton, 1973 — New Zealand
- Amphinecta mara Forster & Wilton, 1973 — New Zealand
- Amphinecta milina Forster & Wilton, 1973 — New Zealand
- Amphinecta mula Forster & Wilton, 1973 — New Zealand
- Amphinecta pika Forster & Wilton, 1973 — New Zealand
- Amphinecta pila Forster & Wilton, 1973 — New Zealand
- Amphinecta puka Forster & Wilton, 1973 — New Zealand
- Amphinecta tama Forster & Wilton, 1973 — New Zealand
- Amphinecta tula Forster & Wilton, 1973 — New Zealand

=== Austmusia ===
Austmusia Gray, 1983

- Austmusia kioloa Gray, 1983 — Australia (New South Wales)
- Austmusia lindi Gray, 1983 — Australia (Victoria)
- Austmusia wilsoni Gray, 1983 (type) — Australia (New South Wales)

== B ==
=== Badumna ===
Badumna

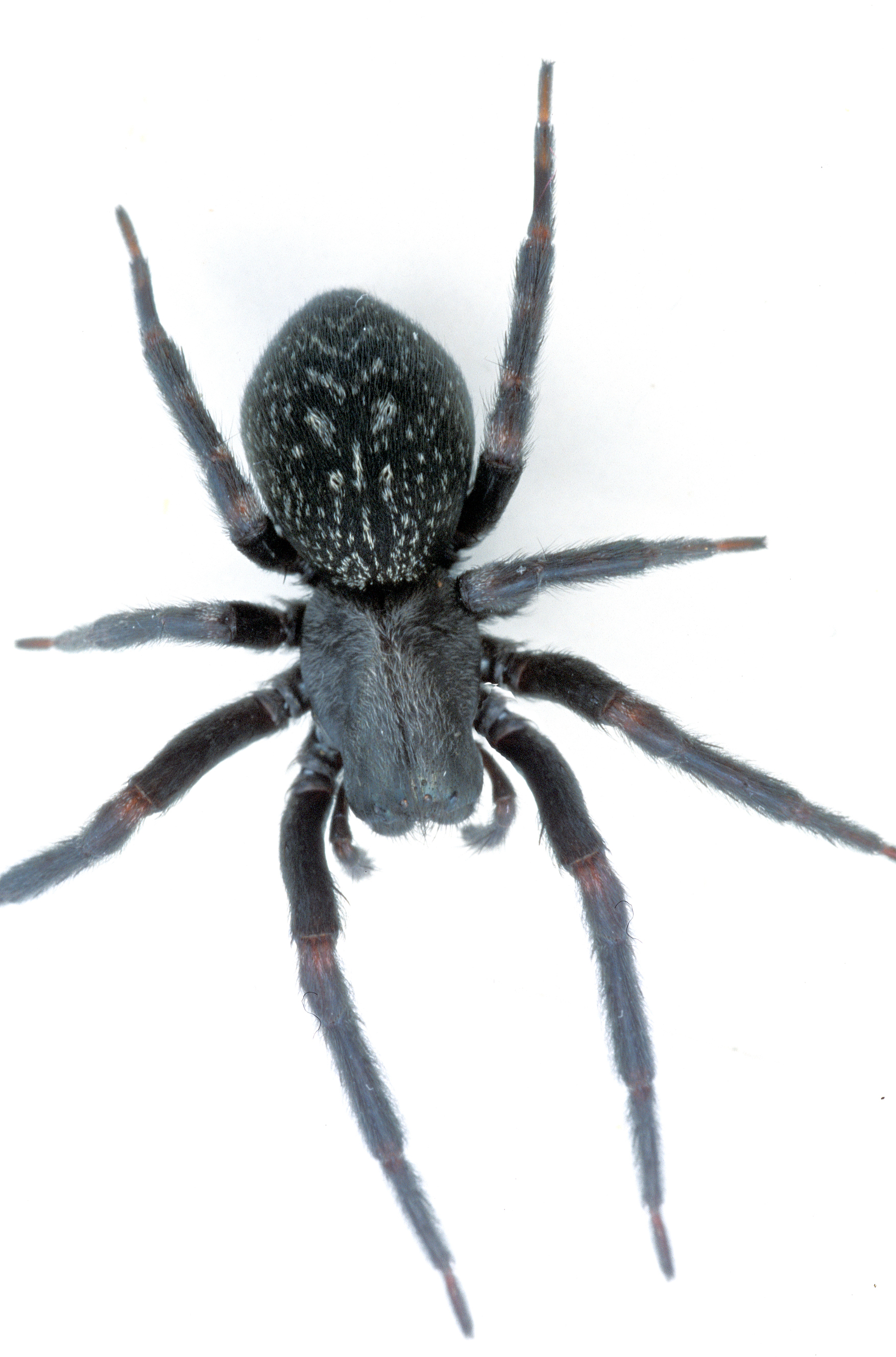
Black House Spider
(Badumna insignis)

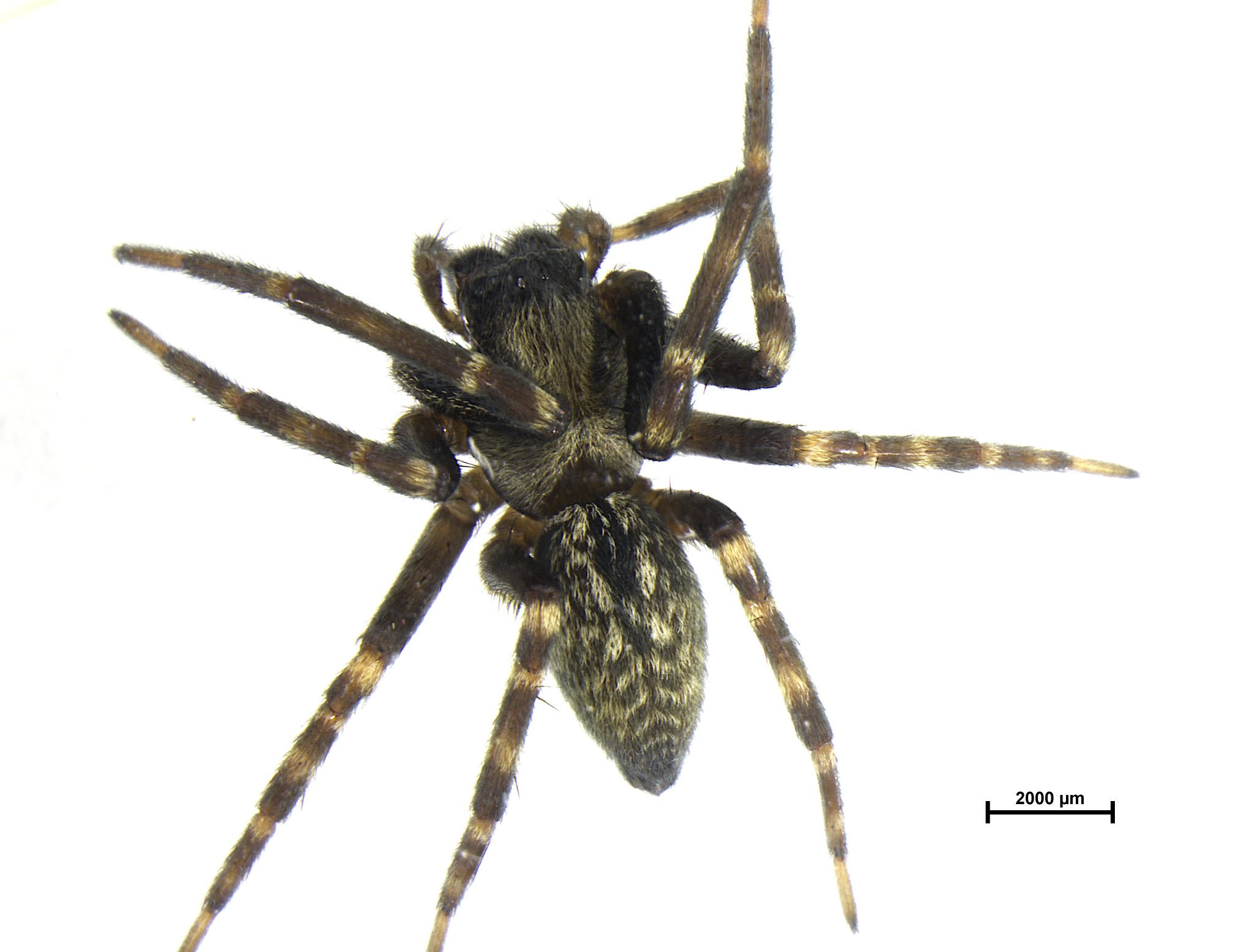
Badumna longinqua

Badumna Thorell, 1890

- Badumna arguta (Simon, 1906) — Australia (Queensland)
- Badumna bimetallica (Hogg, 1896) — Central Australia
- Badumna exilis Thorell, 1890 — Indonesia (Java)
- Badumna exsiccata (Strand, 1913) — Australia
- Badumna guttipes (Simon, 1906) — Australia (Victoria, Tasmania)
- Badumna hirsuta Thorell, 1890 (type) — Indonesia (Java)
- Badumna hygrophila (Simon, 1902) — Australia (Queensland)
- Badumna insignis (L. Koch, 1872) — Australia. Introducded to Japan, New Zealand
- Badumna longinqua (L. Koch, 1867) — Eastern Australia. Introduced to USA, Mexico, Uruguay, Japan, New Zealand
- Badumna maculata (Rainbow, 1916) — Australia (Queensland)
- Badumna microps (Simon, 1908) — Australia (Western Australia)
- Badumna pilosa (Hogg, 1900) — Australia (Victoria)
- Badumna scalaris (L. Koch, 1872) — Australia (Queensland, central Australia)
- Badumna senilella (Strand, 1907) — Australia
- Badumna socialis (Rainbow, 1905) — Australia (New South Wales)
- Badumna tangae Zhu, Zhang & Yang, 2006 — China

=== Baiami ===
Baiami Lehtinen, 1967

- Baiami brockmani Gray, 1981 — Australia (Western Australia)
- Baiami glenelgi Gray, 1981 — Australia (Victoria)
- Baiami loftyensis Gray, 1981 — Australia (South Australia)
- Baiami montana Gray, 1981 — Australia (Western Australia)
- Baiami stirlingi Gray, 1981 — Australia (Western Australia)
- Baiami storeniformis (Simon, 1908) — Australia (Western Australia)
- Baiami tegenarioides (Simon, 1908) — Australia (Western Australia)
- Baiami torbayensis Gray, 1981 — Australia (Western Australia)
- Baiami volucripes (Simon, 1908) (type) — Australia (Western Australia)

=== Bakala ===
Bakala Davies, 1990

- Bakala episinoides Davies, 1990 (type) — Australia (Queensland)

=== Barahna ===
Barahna Davies, 2003

- Barahna booloumba Davies, 2003 (type) — Australia (Queensland, New South Wales)
- Barahna brooyar Davies, 2003 — Australia (Queensland)
- Barahna glenelg Davies, 2003 — Australia (Victoria)
- Barahna myall Davies, 2003 — Australia (New South Wales)
- Barahna scoria Davies, 2003 — Australia (Queensland)
- Barahna taroom Davies, 2003 — Australia (Queensland)
- Barahna toonumbar Davies, 2003 — Australia (New South Wales)
- Barahna yeppoon Davies, 2003 — Australia (Queensland, New South Wales)

=== Buyina ===
Buyina Davies, 1998

- Buyina halifax Davies, 1998 (type) — Australia (Queensland)
- Buyina yeatesi Davies, 1998 — Australia (Queensland)

== C ==
=== Calacadia ===
Calacadia Exline, 1960

- Calacadia ambigua (Nicolet, 1849) — Chile
- Calacadia chilensis Exline, 1960 (type) — Chile
- Calacadia dentifera (Tullgren, 1902) — Chile
- Calacadia livens (Simon, 1902) — Chile
- Calacadia osorno Exline, 1960 — Chile
- Calacadia radulifera (Simon, 1902) — Chile
- Calacadia rossi Exline, 1960 — Chile

=== Cambridgea ===
Cambridgea L. Koch, 1872

- Cambridgea agrestis Forster & Wilton, 1973 — New Zealand
- Cambridgea ambigua Blest & Vink, 2000 — New Zealand
- Cambridgea annulata Dalmas, 1917 — New Zealand (Chatham Is.)
- Cambridgea antipodiana (White, 1849) (type) — New Zealand
- Cambridgea arboricola (Urquhart, 1891) — New Zealand
- Cambridgea australis Blest & Vink, 2000 — New Zealand
- Cambridgea decorata Blest & Vink, 2000 — New Zealand
- Cambridgea elegans Blest & Vink, 2000 — New Zealand
- Cambridgea elongata Blest & Vink, 2000 — New Zealand
- Cambridgea fasciata L. Koch, 1872 — New Zealand
- Cambridgea foliata (L. Koch, 1872) — New Zealand
- Cambridgea inaequalis Blest & Vink, 2000 — New Zealand
- Cambridgea insulana Blest & Vink, 2000 — New Zealand
- Cambridgea longipes Blest & Vink, 2000 — New Zealand
- Cambridgea mercurialis Blest & Vink, 2000 — New Zealand
- Cambridgea obscura Blest & Vink, 2000 — New Zealand
- Cambridgea occidentalis Forster & Wilton, 1973 — New Zealand
- Cambridgea ordishi Blest & Vink, 2000 — New Zealand
- Cambridgea pallidula Blest & Vink, 2000 — New Zealand
- Cambridgea peculiaris Forster & Wilton, 1973 — New Zealand
- Cambridgea peelensis Blest & Vink, 2000 — New Zealand
- Cambridgea plagiata Forster & Wilton, 1973 — New Zealand
- Cambridgea quadromaculata Blest & Taylor, 1995 — New Zealand
- Cambridgea ramsayi Forster & Wilton, 1973 — New Zealand
- Cambridgea reinga Forster & Wilton, 1973 — New Zealand
- Cambridgea secunda Forster & Wilton, 1973 — New Zealand
- Cambridgea simoni Berland, 1924 — New Caledonia
- Cambridgea solanderensis Blest & Vink, 2000 — New Zealand
- Cambridgea sylvatica Forster & Wilton, 1973 — New Zealand
- Cambridgea tuiae Blest & Vink, 2000 — New Zealand
- Cambridgea turbotti Forster & Wilton, 1973 — New Zealand

=== Canala ===
Canala Gray, 1992

- Canala longipes (Berland, 1924) — New Caledonia
- Canala magna (Berland, 1924) (type) — New Caledonia
- Canala poya Gray, 1992 — New Caledonia

=== Cedicoides ===
Cedicoides Charitonov, 1946

- Cedicoides maerens (Simon, 1889) — Turkmenistan
- Cedicoides parthus (Fet, 1993) — Turkmenistan
- Cedicoides pavlovskyi (Spassky, 1941) — Tajikistan
- Cedicoides simoni (Charitonov, 1946) (type) — Uzbekistan

=== Cedicus ===
Cedicus Simon, 1875

- Cedicus bucculentus Simon, 1889 — Himalayas
- Cedicus dubius Strand, 1907 — Japan
- Cedicus flavipes Simon, 1875 (type) — Eastern Mediterranean
- Cedicus israeliensis Levy, 1996 — Turkey, Israel
- Cedicus pumilus Thorell, 1895 — Myanmar

=== Cicirra ===
Cicirra Simon, 1886

- Cicirra decemmaculata Simon, 1886 (type) — Australia (Tasmania)

=== Colcarteria ===
Colcarteria Gray, 1992

- Colcarteria carrai Gray, 1992 (type) — Australia (New South Wales)
- Colcarteria kempseyi Gray, 1992 — Australia (New South Wales)
- Colcarteria yessabah Gray, 1992 — Australia (New South Wales)

=== Corasoides ===
Corasoides Butler, 1929

- Corasoides angusi Humphrey, 2017 — Papua New Guinea
- Corasoides australis Butler, 1929 (type) — Australia
- Corasoides cowanae Humphrey, 2017 — Papua New Guinea
- Corasoides motumae Humphrey, 2017 — Australia (New South Wales)
- Corasoides mouldsi Humphrey, 2017 — Australia (Queensland)
- Corasoides nebula Humphrey, 2017 — Papua New Guinea
- Corasoides nimbus Humphrey, 2017 — Papua New Guinea
- Corasoides occidentalis Humphrey, 2017 — Australia (Western Australia)
- Corasoides stellaris Humphrey, 2017 — Papua New Guinea
- Corasoides terania Humphrey, 2017 — Australia (Queensland, New South Wales)

=== Cunnawarra ===
Cunnawarra Davies, 1998

- Cunnawarra cassisi Davies, 1998 — Australia (New South Wales)
- Cunnawarra grayi Davies, 1998 (type) — Australia (New South Wales)

== D ==
=== Desis ===
Desis

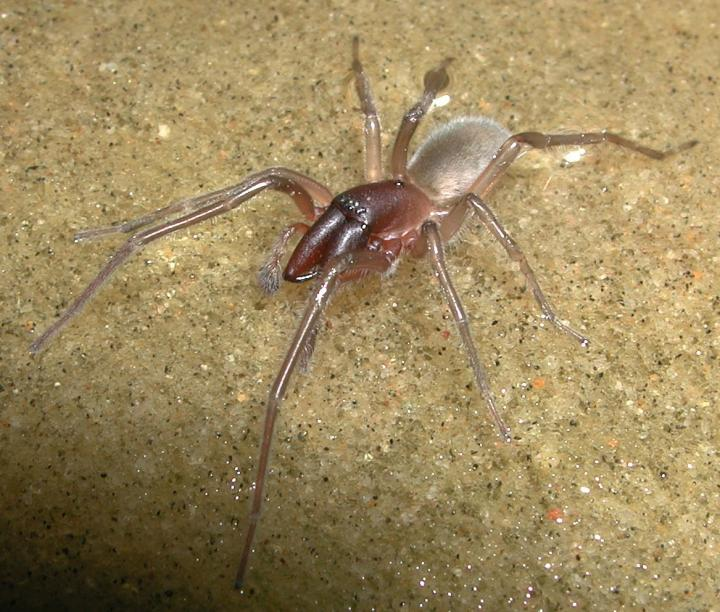
Desis bobmarleyi, male

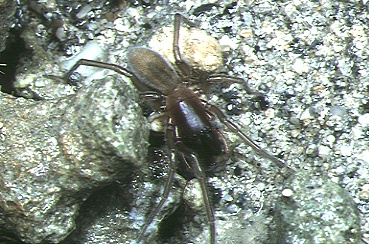
Desis japonica, male

Desis Walckenaer, 1837

- Desis bobmarleyi Baehr, Raven & Harms, 2017 — Australia (Queensland)
- Desis crosslandi Pocock, 1903 — Tanzania (Zanzibar), Madagascar, Comoros, Mayotte
- Desis formidabilis (O. Pickard-Cambridge, 1891) — South Africa
- Desis galapagoensis Hirst, 1925 — Ecuador (Galapagos Is.)
- Desis gardineri Pocock, 1904 — India (Laccadive Is.)
- Desis inermis Gravely, 1927 — India
- Desis japonica Yaginuma, 1956 — Japan
- Desis jiaxiangi Lin, Li & Chen, 2020 — China
- Desis kenyonae Pocock, 1902 — Australia (Victoria, Tasmania)
- Desis marina (Hector, 1877) — New Caledonia, New Zealand (mainland, Chatham Is.)
- Desis martensi L. Koch, 1872 — Malaysia
- Desis maxillosa (Fabricius, 1793) (type) — New Guinea, New Caledonia
- Desis risbeci Berland, 1931 — New Caledonia
- Desis tangana Roewer, 1955 — East Africa
- Desis vorax L. Koch, 1872 — Samoa

=== Dunstanoides ===
Dunstanoides Forster & Wilton, 1989

- Dunstanoides angustiae (Marples, 1959) — New Zealand
- Dunstanoides hesperis (Forster & Wilton, 1973) (type) — New Zealand
- Dunstanoides hinawa (Forster & Wilton, 1973) — New Zealand
- Dunstanoides hova (Forster & Wilton, 1973) — New Zealand
- Dunstanoides kochi (Forster & Wilton, 1973) — New Zealand
- Dunstanoides mirus (Forster & Wilton, 1973) — New Zealand
- Dunstanoides montanus (Forster & Wilton, 1973) — New Zealand
- Dunstanoides nuntius (Marples, 1959) — New Zealand
- Dunstanoides salmoni (Forster & Wilton, 1973) — New Zealand

== E ==
=== Epimecinus ===
Epimecinus Simon, 1908

- Epimecinus alkirna Gray, 1973 — Australia (Western Australia)
- Epimecinus humilis Berland, 1924 — New Caledonia
- Epimecinus nexibilis (Simon, 1906) (type) — New Caledonia
- Epimecinus pullatus (Simon, 1906) — New Caledonia

== F ==
=== Forsterina ===
Forsterina Lehtinen, 1967

- Forsterina alticola (Berland, 1924) — New Caledonia
- Forsterina annulipes (L. Koch, 1872) — Australia (Queensland, New South Wales, Lord Howe Is.)
- Forsterina armigera (Simon, 1908) — Australia (Western Australia)
- Forsterina cryphoeciformis (Simon, 1908) (type) — Australia (Western Australia)
- Forsterina koghiana Gray, 1992 — New Caledonia
- Forsterina segestrina (L. Koch, 1872) — Australia (New South Wales)
- Forsterina velifera (Simon, 1908) — Australia (Western Australia)
- Forsterina virgosa (Simon, 1908) — Australia (Western Australia)
- Forsterina vultuosa (Simon, 1908) — Australia (Western Australia)

== G ==
=== Goyenia ===
Goyenia Forster, 1970

- Goyenia electa Forster, 1970 (type) — New Zealand
- Goyenia fresa Forster, 1970 — New Zealand
- Goyenia gratiosa Forster, 1970 — New Zealand
- Goyenia lucrosa Forster, 1970 — New Zealand
- Goyenia marplesi Forster, 1970 — New Zealand
- Goyenia multidentata Forster, 1970 — New Zealand
- Goyenia ornata Forster, 1970 — New Zealand
- Goyenia sana Forster, 1970 — New Zealand
- Goyenia scitula Forster, 1970 — New Zealand
- Goyenia sylvatica Forster, 1970 — New Zealand

== H ==
=== Helsonia ===
Helsonia Forster, 1970

- Helsonia plata Forster, 1970 (type) — New Zealand

=== Holomamoea ===
Holomamoea Forster & Wilton, 1973

- Holomamoea foveata Forster & Wilton, 1973 (type) — New Zealand

=== Huara ===
Huara Forster, 1964

- Huara antarctica (Berland, 1931) (type) — New Zealand (Auckland Is.)
- Huara chapmanae Forster & Wilton, 1973 — New Zealand
- Huara decorata Forster & Wilton, 1973 — New Zealand
- Huara dolosa Forster & Wilton, 1973 — New Zealand
- Huara grossa Forster, 1964 — New Zealand (Auckland Is.)
- Huara hastata Forster & Wilton, 1973 — New Zealand
- Huara inflata Forster & Wilton, 1973 — New Zealand
- Huara kikkawa Forster & Wilton, 1973 — New Zealand
- Huara marplesi Forster & Wilton, 1973 — New Zealand
- Huara mura Forster & Wilton, 1973 — New Zealand
- Huara ovalis (Hogg, 1909) — New Zealand (Snares Is.)
- Huara pudica Forster & Wilton, 1973 — New Zealand

== I ==
=== Ischalea ===
Ischalea L. Koch, 1872

- Ischalea incerta (O. Pickard-Cambridge, 1877) — Madagascar
- Ischalea longiceps Simon, 1898 — Mauritius
- Ischalea spinipes L. Koch, 1872 (type) — New Zealand

== J ==
=== Jalkaraburra ===
Jalkaraburra Davies, 1998

- Jalkaraburra alta Davies, 1998 (type) — Australia (Queensland)

== K ==
=== Keera ===
Keera Davies, 1998

- Keera longipalpis Davies, 1998 (type) — Australia (New South Wales)

== L ==
=== Lathyarcha ===
Lathyarcha Simon, 1908

- Lathyarcha cinctipes (Simon, 1906) — Australia (Victoria)
- Lathyarcha inornata (L. Koch, 1872) — Australia (Queensland, New South Wales)
- Lathyarcha tetrica Simon, 1908 (type) — Australia (Western Australia)

== M ==
=== Magua ===
Magua Davies, 1998

- Magua wiangaree Davies, 1998 (type) — Australia (New South Wales)

=== Makora ===
Makora Forster & Wilton, 1973

- Makora calypso (Marples, 1959) — New Zealand
- Makora detrita Forster & Wilton, 1973 — New Zealand
- Makora diversa Forster & Wilton, 1973 — New Zealand
- Makora figurata Forster & Wilton, 1973 (type) — New Zealand
- Makora mimica Forster & Wilton, 1973 — New Zealand

=== Mamoea ===
Mamoea Forster & Wilton, 1973

- Mamoea assimilis Forster & Wilton, 1973 — New Zealand
- Mamoea bicolor (Bryant, 1935) — New Zealand
- Mamoea cantuaria Forster & Wilton, 1973 — New Zealand
- Mamoea cooki Forster & Wilton, 1973 — New Zealand
- Mamoea florae Forster & Wilton, 1973 — New Zealand
- Mamoea grandiosa Forster & Wilton, 1973 — New Zealand
- Mamoea hesperis Forster & Wilton, 1973 — New Zealand
- Mamoea hughsoni Forster & Wilton, 1973 — New Zealand
- Mamoea inornata Forster & Wilson, 1973 — New Zealand
- Mamoea mandibularis (Bryant, 1935) — New Zealand
- Mamoea maorica Forster & Wilton, 1973 — New Zealand
- Mamoea montana Forster & Wilton, 1973 — New Zealand
- Mamoea monticola Forster & Wilton, 1973 — New Zealand
- Mamoea otira Forster & Wilton, 1973 — New Zealand
- Mamoea pilosa (Bryant, 1935) — New Zealand
- Mamoea rakiura Forster & Wilton, 1973 — New Zealand
- Mamoea rufa (Berland, 1931) (type) — New Zealand (Campbell Is.)
- Mamoea unica Forster & Wilton, 1973 — New Zealand
- Mamoea westlandica Forster & Wilton, 1973 — New Zealand

=== Mangareia ===
Mangareia Forster, 1970

- Mangareia maculata Forster, 1970 (type) — New Zealand
- Mangareia motu Forster, 1970 — New Zealand

=== Maniho ===
Maniho Marples, 1959

- Maniho australis Forster & Wilton, 1973 — New Zealand
- Maniho cantuarius Forster & Wilton, 1973 — New Zealand
- Maniho centralis Forster & Wilton, 1973 — New Zealand
- Maniho insulanus Forster & Wilton, 1973 — New Zealand
- Maniho meridionalis Forster & Wilton, 1973 — New Zealand
- Maniho ngaitahu Forster & Wilton, 1973 — New Zealand
- Maniho otagoensis Forster & Wilton, 1973 — New Zealand
- Maniho pumilio Forster & Wilton, 1973 — New Zealand
- Maniho tigris Marples, 1959 (type) — New Zealand
- Maniho vulgaris Forster & Wilton, 1973 — New Zealand

=== Manjala ===
Manjala Davies, 1990

- Manjala pallida Davies, 1990 — Australia (Queensland)
- Manjala plana Davies, 1990 (type) — Australia (Queensland)
- Manjala spinosa Davies, 1990 — Australia (Queensland)

=== Matachia ===
Matachia Dalmas, 1917

- Matachia australis Forster, 1970 — New Zealand
- Matachia livor (Urquhart, 1893) — New Zealand
- Matachia marplesi Forster, 1970 — New Zealand
- Matachia ramulicola Dalmas, 1917 (type) — New Zealand
- Matachia similis Forster, 1970 — New Zealand

=== Mesudus ===
Mesudus Özdikmen, 2007

- Mesudus frondosus (Forster, 1970) — New Zealand
- Mesudus setosus (Forster, 1970) — New Zealand
- Mesudus solitarius (Forster, 1970) (type) — New Zealand

=== Metaltella ===
Metaltella Mello-Leitão, 1931

- Metaltella arcoiris (Mello-Leitão, 1943) — Chile
- Metaltella iheringi (Keyserling, 1891) (type) — Brazil, Argentina
- Metaltella imitans (Mello-Leitão, 1940) — Argentina
- Metaltella rorulenta (Nicolet, 1849) — Peru, Chile, Argentina
- Metaltella simoni (Keyserling, 1878) — Brazil, Uruguay, Argentina. Introduced to USA, Canada
- Metaltella tigrina (Mello-Leitão, 1943) — Argentina

== N ==
=== Namandia ===
Namandia Lehtinen, 1967

- Namandia periscelis (Simon, 1903) (type) — Australia (Tasmania)

=== Nanocambridgea ===
Nanocambridgea

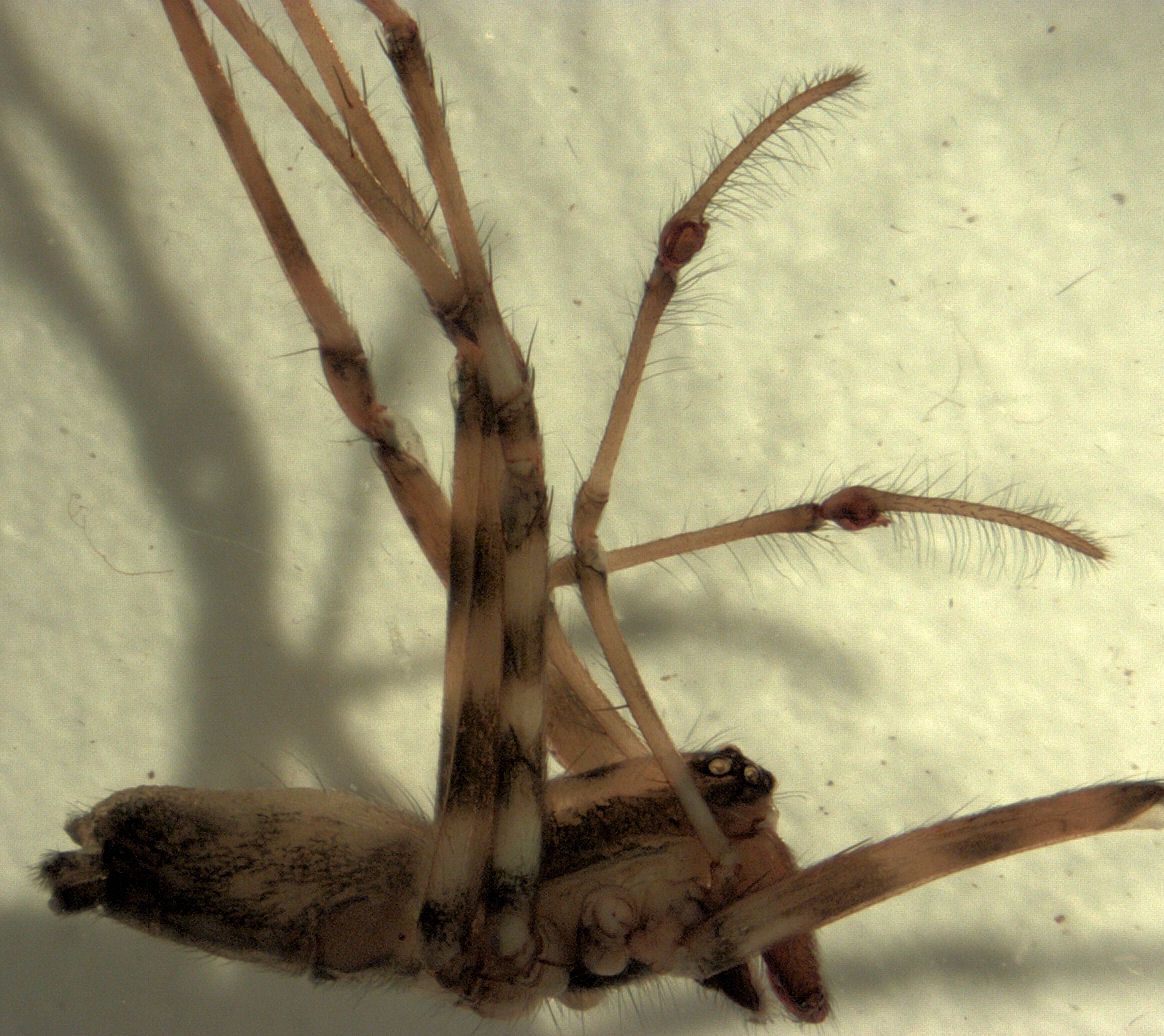
Nanocambridgea gracilipes, male

Nanocambridgea Forster & Wilton, 1973

- Nanocambridgea gracilipes Forster & Wilton, 1973 (type) — New Zealand

=== Neororea ===
Neororea Forster & Wilton, 1973

- Neororea homerica Forster & Wilton, 1973 — New Zealand
- Neororea sorenseni (Forster, 1955) (type) — New Zealand (Auckland Is.)

=== Notomatachia ===
Notomatachia Forster, 1970

- Notomatachia cantuaria Forster, 1970 — New Zealand
- Notomatachia hirsuta (Marples, 1962) (type) — New Zealand
- Notomatachia wiltoni Forster, 1970 — New Zealand

=== Nuisiana ===
Nuisiana Forster & Wilton, 1973

- Nuisiana arboris (Marples, 1959) (type) — New Zealand

== O ==
=== Oparara ===
Oparara Forster & Wilton, 1973

- Oparara karamea Forster & Wilton, 1973 — New Zealand
- Oparara vallus (Marples, 1959) (type) — New Zealand

== P ==
=== Panoa ===
Panoa Forster, 1970

- Panoa contorta Forster, 1970 (type) — New Zealand
- Panoa fiordensis Forster, 1970 — New Zealand
- Panoa mora Forster, 1970 — New Zealand
- Panoa tapanuiensis Forster, 1970 — New Zealand

=== Paracedicus ===
Paracedicus Simon, 1875

- Paracedicus baram Levy, 2007 — Turkey, Israel
- Paracedicus darvishi Mirshamsi, 2018 — Iran
- Paracedicus ephthalitus (Fet, 1993) (type) — Turkmenistan
- Paracedicus feti Marusik & Guseinov, 2003 — Azerbaijan
- Paracedicus gennadii (Fet, 1993) — Iran, Kazakhstan, Turkmenistan
- Paracedicus geshur Levy, 2007 — Israel
- Paracedicus kasatkini Zamani & Marusik, 2017 — Iran
- Paracedicus turcicus Gündüz, 2023 — Turkey

=== Paramamoea ===
Paramamoea Forster & Wilton, 1973

- Paramamoea aquilonalis Forster & Wilton, 1973 — New Zealand
- Paramamoea arawa Forster & Wilton, 1973 — New Zealand
- Paramamoea incerta Forster & Wilton, 1973 (type) — New Zealand
- Paramamoea incertoides Forster & Wilton, 1973 — New Zealand
- Paramamoea insulana Forster & Wilton, 1973 — New Zealand
- Paramamoea pandora Forster & Wilton, 1973 — New Zealand
- Paramamoea paradisica Forster & Wilton, 1973 — New Zealand
- Paramamoea parva Forster & Wilton, 1973 — New Zealand
- Paramamoea urewera Forster & Wilton, 1973 — New Zealand
- Paramamoea waipoua Forster & Wilton, 1973 — New Zealand

=== Paramatachia ===
Paramatachia Dalmas, 1918

- Paramatachia ashtonensis Marples, 1962 — Australia (New South Wales)
- Paramatachia cataracta Marples, 1962 — Australia (New South Wales)
- Paramatachia decorata Dalmas, 1918 (type) — Australia (Queensland)
- Paramatachia media Marples, 1962 — Australia (Victoria)
- Paramatachia tubicola (Hickman, 1950) — Australia (South Australia, Tasmania)

=== Penaoola ===
Penaoola Davies, 1998

- Penaoola algida Davies, 1998 (type) — Australia (South Australia)
- Penaoola madida Davies, 1998 — Australia (South Australia)

=== Phryganoporus ===
Phryganoporus Simon, 1908

- Phryganoporus candidus (L. Koch, 1872) (type) — Australia (mainland, Norfolk Is.)
- Phryganoporus davidleei Gray, 2002 — Australia (Western Australia, South Australia)
- Phryganoporus melanopygus Gray, 2002 — Australia (Western Australia)
- Phryganoporus nigrinus Simon, 1908 — Australia (Western Australia to Queensland)
- Phryganoporus vandiemeni (Gray, 1983) — Australia (Victoria, Tasmania)

=== Pitonga ===
Pitonga Davies, 1984

- Pitonga woolowa Davies, 1984 (type) — Northern Australia

=== Poaka ===
Poaka Forster & Wilton, 1973

- Poaka graminicola Forster & Wilton, 1973 (type) — New Zealand

=== Porteria ===
Porteria Simon, 1904

- Porteria ajimayo Morrill, Crews, Esposito, Ramírez & Griswold, 2023 — Chile
- Porteria albopunctata Simon, 1904 (type) — Chile
- Porteria alopobre Morrill, Crews, Esposito, Ramírez & Griswold, 2023 — Chile
- Porteria ariasbohartae Morrill, Crews, Esposito, Ramírez & Griswold, 2023 — Chile
- Porteria bunnyana Morrill, Crews, Esposito, Ramírez & Griswold, 2023 — Chile
- Porteria contulmo Morrill, Crews, Esposito, Ramírez & Griswold, 2023 — Chile
- Porteria correcaminos Morrill, Crews, Esposito, Ramírez & Griswold, 2023 — Chile
- Porteria eddardstarki Morrill, Crews, Esposito, Ramírez & Griswold, 2023 — Chile
- Porteria faberi Morrill, Crews, Esposito, Ramírez & Griswold, 2023 — Chile
- Porteria fiura Morrill, Crews, Esposito, Ramírez & Griswold, 2023 — Chile
- Porteria misbianka Morrill, Crews, Esposito, Ramírez & Griswold, 2023 — Chile
- Porteria torobayo Morrill, Crews, Esposito, Ramírez & Griswold, 2023 — Chile

== Q ==
=== Quemusia ===
Quemusia Davies, 1998

- Quemusia aquilonia Davies, 1998 (type) — Australia (Queensland)
- Quemusia austrina Davies, 1998 — Australia (Queensland)
- Quemusia cordillera Davies, 1998 — Australia (New South Wales)
- Quemusia raveni Davies, 1998 — Australia (Queensland)

== R ==
=== Rangitata ===
Rangitata Forster & Wilton, 1973

- Rangitata peelensis Forster & Wilton, 1973 (type) — New Zealand

=== Rapua ===
Rapua Forster, 1970

- Rapua australis Forster, 1970 (type) — New Zealand

=== Reinga ===
Reinga Forster & Wilton, 1973

- Reinga apica Forster & Wilton, 1973 — New Zealand
- Reinga aucklandensis (Marples, 1959) — New Zealand
- Reinga grossa Forster & Wilton, 1973 — New Zealand
- Reinga media Forster & Wilton, 1973 (type) — New Zealand
- Reinga waipoua Forster & Wilton, 1973 — New Zealand

=== Rorea ===
Rorea Forster & Wilton, 1973

- Rorea aucklandensis Forster & Wilton, 1973 (type) — New Zealand (Auckland Is.)
- Rorea otagoensis Forster & Wilton, 1973 — New Zealand

== S ==
=== Syrorisa ===
Syrorisa Simon, 1908

- Syrorisa misella (Simon, 1906) (type) — New Caledonia, Australia (Western Australia)

== T ==
=== Tanganoides ===
Tanganoides Davies, 2005

- Tanganoides acutus (Davies, 2003) — Australia (Tasmania)
- Tanganoides clarkei (Davies, 2003) — Australia (Tasmania)
- Tanganoides collinus (Davies, 2003) — Australia (Tasmania)
- Tanganoides greeni (Davies, 2003) (type) — Australia (Tasmania)
- Tanganoides harveyi (Davies, 2003) — Australia (Victoria)
- Tanganoides mcpartlan (Davies, 2003) — Australia (Tasmania)

=== Taurongia ===
Taurongia Hogg, 1901

- Taurongia ambigua Gray, 2005 — Australia (Victoria)
- Taurongia punctata (Hogg, 1900) (type) — Australia (Victoria)

=== Tuakana ===
Tuakana Forster, 1970

- Tuakana mirada Forster, 1970 — New Zealand
- Tuakana wiltoni Forster, 1970 (type) — New Zealand

== W ==
=== Waterea ===
Waterea Forster & Wilton, 1973

- Waterea cornigera Forster & Wilton, 1973 (type) — New Zealand
