= Cicirra =

Scientific classification
- Kingdom: Animalia
- Phylum: Arthropoda
- Subphylum: Chelicerata
- Class: Arachnida
- Order: Araneae
- Infraorder: Araneomorphae
- Family: Desidae
- Genus: Cicirra; Simon, 1886
- Species: C. decemmaculata

Binomial name
- Cicirra decemmaculata Simon, 1886

Genus of spiders

Cicirra is a monotypic genus of Australian intertidal spiders containing the single species, Cicirra decemmaculata. It was first described by Eugène Simon in 1886, and has only been found in Australia. Originally placed with the funnel-weavers, it was moved to the Matachiinae (subfamily of the Amaurobiidae) in 1967. They are closely related to Forsterina.
