= Porteria albopunctata =

Scientific classification
- Kingdom: Animalia
- Phylum: Arthropoda
- Subphylum: Chelicerata
- Class: Arachnida
- Order: Araneae
- Infraorder: Araneomorphae
- Family: Desidae
- Genus: Porteria
- Species: P. albopunctata

Binomial name
- Porteria albopunctata Simon, 1904

Species of spider

Porteria albopunctata is a species of spider in the family Desidae. It was discovered by Eugène Louis Simon in 1904 and is found in Chile.
