= Oparara karamea =

Conservation status
- Data Deficit (NZ TCS)

Scientific classification
- Kingdom: Animalia
- Phylum: Arthropoda
- Subphylum: Chelicerata
- Class: Arachnida
- Order: Araneae
- Infraorder: Araneomorphae
- Family: Desidae
- Genus: Oparara
- Species: O. karamea

Binomial name
- Oparara karamea Forster & Wilton, 1973

Species of spider

Oparara karamea is a species of spider in the family Desidae that is endemic to New Zealand.

== Taxonomy ==
This species was described by Ray Forster and Cecil Wilton in 1973 from female specimens. The holotype is stored in Canterbury Museum.

== Description ==
The female is recorded at 6.8mm in length. The carapace and legs are coloured dark reddish brown. The abdomen is mottled greyish brown.

== Distribution ==
This species is only known from Nelson, New Zealand.

== Conservation status ==
Under the New Zealand Threat Classification System, this species is listed as "Data Deficient" with the qualifiers of "Data Poor: Size" and "Data Poor: Trend".
