= Tuakana =

Scientific classification
- Domain: Eukaryota
- Kingdom: Animalia
- Phylum: Arthropoda
- Subphylum: Chelicerata
- Class: Arachnida
- Order: Araneae
- Infraorder: Araneomorphae
- Family: Desidae
- Genus: Tuakana; Forster, 1970

Type species
- T. wiltoni Forster, 1970

Species
- T. mirada Forster, 1970 – New Zealand; T. wiltoni Forster, 1970 – New Zealand

Genus of spiders

Tuakana is a genus of South Pacific intertidal spiders that was first described by Raymond Robert Forster in 1970. As of May 2019 it contains only two species, both found in New Zealand: T. mirada and T. wiltoni.
