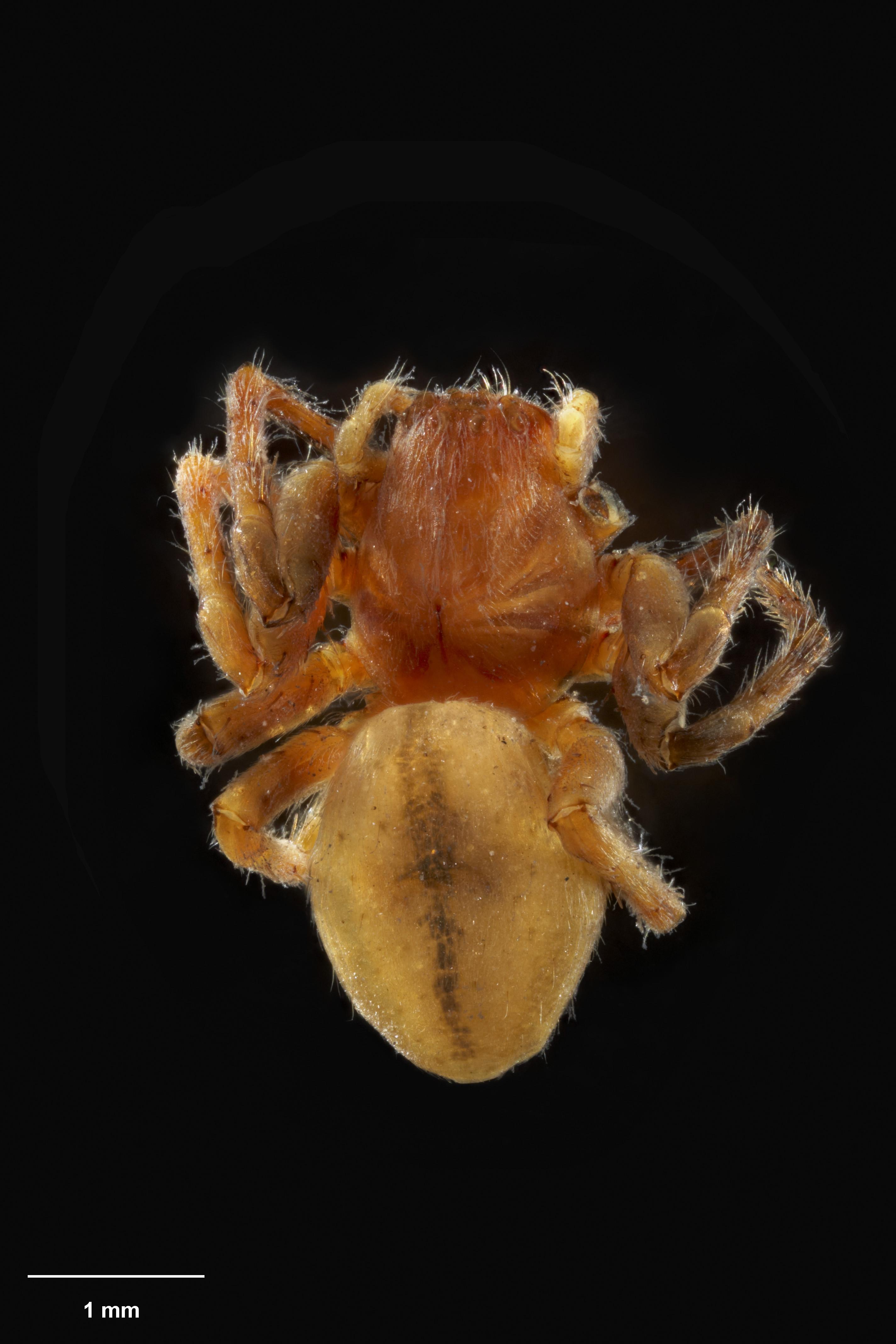

Scientific classification
- Kingdom: Animalia
- Phylum: Arthropoda
- Subphylum: Chelicerata
- Class: Arachnida
- Order: Araneae
- Infraorder: Araneomorphae
- Family: Desidae
- Genus: Panoa; Forster, 1970

Type species
- P. contorta Forster, 1970

Species
- 4, see text

= Panoa =

Genus of spiders

Panoa is a genus of intertidal spiders. It was first described by Raymond Robert Forster in 1970, and it has only been found in New Zealand.

== Species ==
As of February 2022 it contains four species:

- P. contorta Forster, 1970 (type) – New Zealand
- P. fiordensis Forster, 1970 – New Zealand
- P. mora Forster, 1970 – New Zealand
- P. tapanuiensis Forster, 1970 – New Zealand
