= Namandia =

Scientific classification
- Kingdom: Animalia
- Phylum: Arthropoda
- Subphylum: Chelicerata
- Class: Arachnida
- Order: Araneae
- Infraorder: Araneomorphae
- Family: Desidae
- Genus: Namandia; Lehtinen, 1967
- Species: N. periscelis

Binomial name
- Namandia periscelis (Simon, 1903)

Genus of spiders

Namandia is a monotypic genus of Australian intertidal spiders containing the single species, Namandia periscelis. It was first described by Pekka T. Lehtinen in 1967, and has only been found in Australia.
