= Mesudus solitarius =

Conservation status
- Data Deficit (NZ TCS)

Scientific classification
- Kingdom: Animalia
- Phylum: Arthropoda
- Subphylum: Chelicerata
- Class: Arachnida
- Order: Araneae
- Infraorder: Araneomorphae
- Family: Desidae
- Genus: Mesudus
- Species: M. solitarius

Binomial name
- Mesudus solitarius (Forster, 1970)

Synonyms
- Manawa solitaria

Species of spider

Mesudus solitarius is a species of Desidae spider that is endemic to New Zealand.

== Taxonomy ==
This species was described as Manawa solitaria by Ray Forster in 1970 from female specimens. The holotype is stored in Canterbury Museum.

== Description ==
The female is recorded at 6.3mm in length. The carapace and legs are yellow brown. The abdomen is creamy with dark patches.

== Distribution ==
This species is only known from Nelson, New Zealand.

== Conservation status ==
Under the New Zealand Threat Classification System, this species is listed as "Data Deficient" with the qualifiers of "Data Poor: Size" and "Data Poor: Trend".
