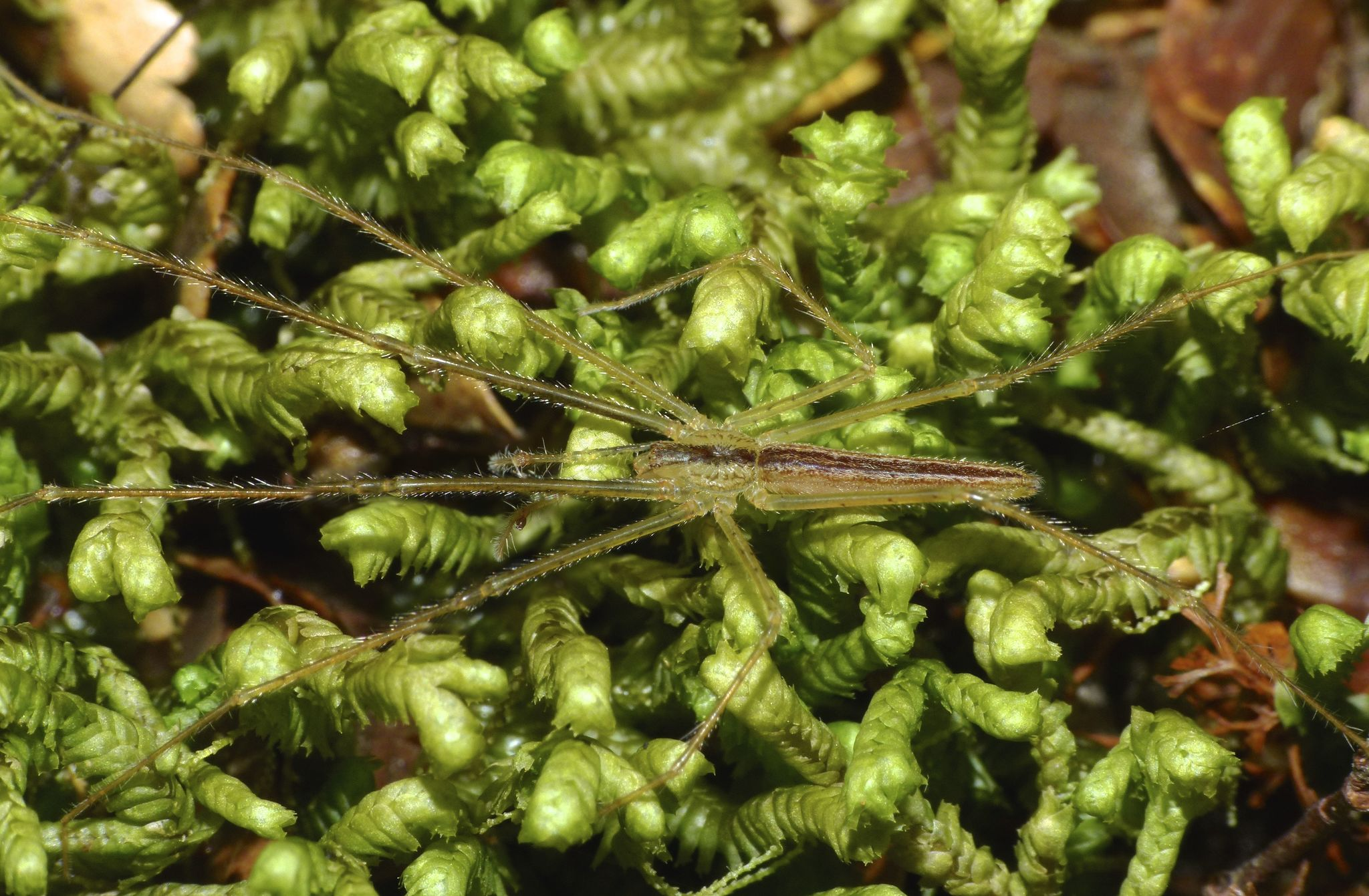

Conservation status
- Not Threatened (NZ TCS)

Scientific classification
- Domain: Eukaryota
- Kingdom: Animalia
- Phylum: Arthropoda
- Subphylum: Chelicerata
- Class: Arachnida
- Order: Araneae
- Infraorder: Araneomorphae
- Family: Desidae
- Genus: Ischalea
- Species: I. spinipes

Binomial name
- Ischalea spinipes Koch, 1872

= Ischalea spinipes =

Species of spider

Ischalea spinipes is a species of Desidae that is endemic to New Zealand.

== Taxonomy ==
This species was described by Ludwig Carl Christian Koch. It was most recently revised in 1973. The holotype is stored in Natural History Museum, London.

== Description ==
The male is recorded at 10.1mm in length whereas the female is 16.0mm. In life, the spider is coloured green.

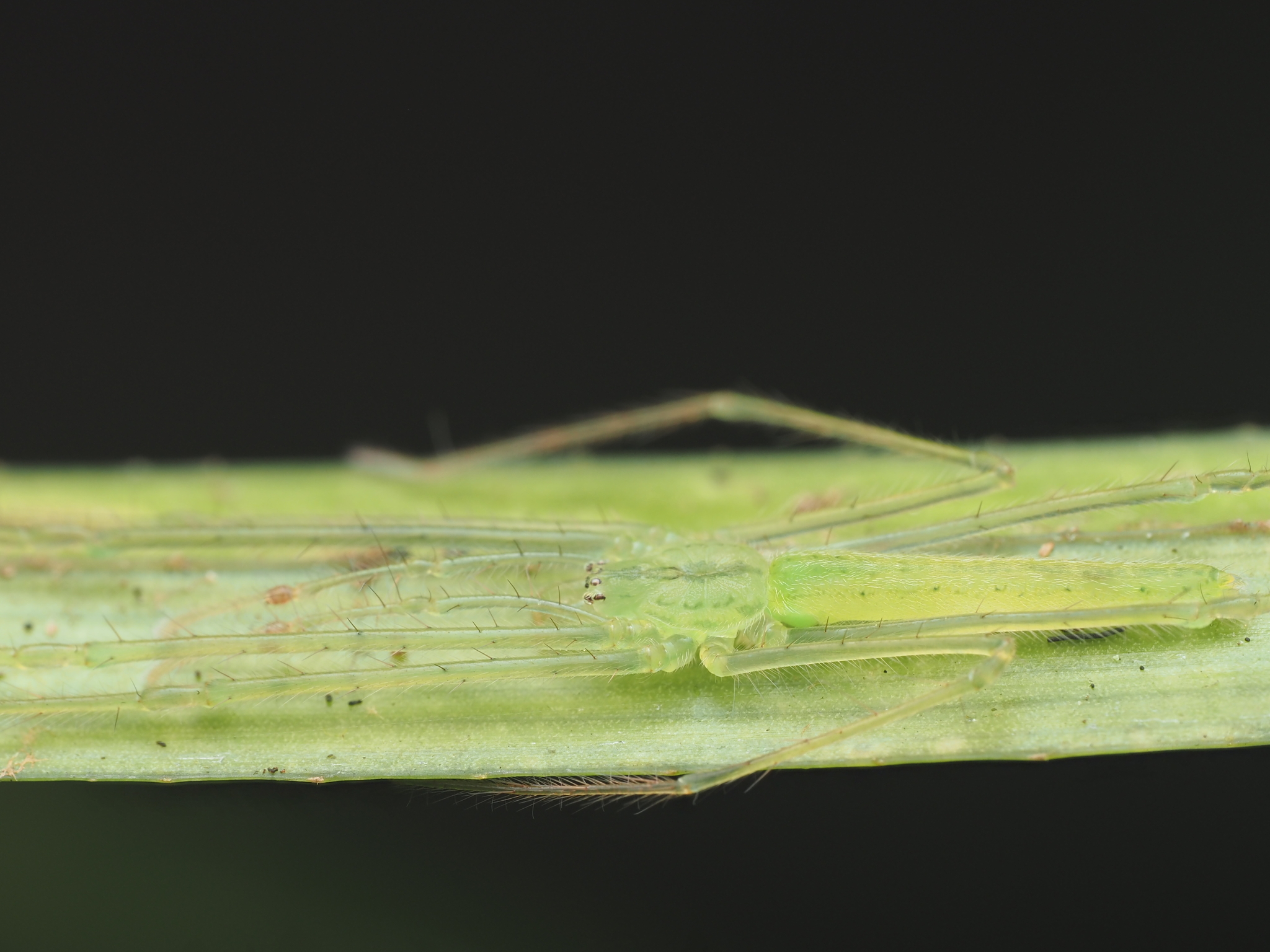

== Distribution ==
This species is widespread throughout New Zealand.

== Conservation status ==
Under the New Zealand Threat Classification System, this species is listed as "Not Threatened".

== Gallery ==
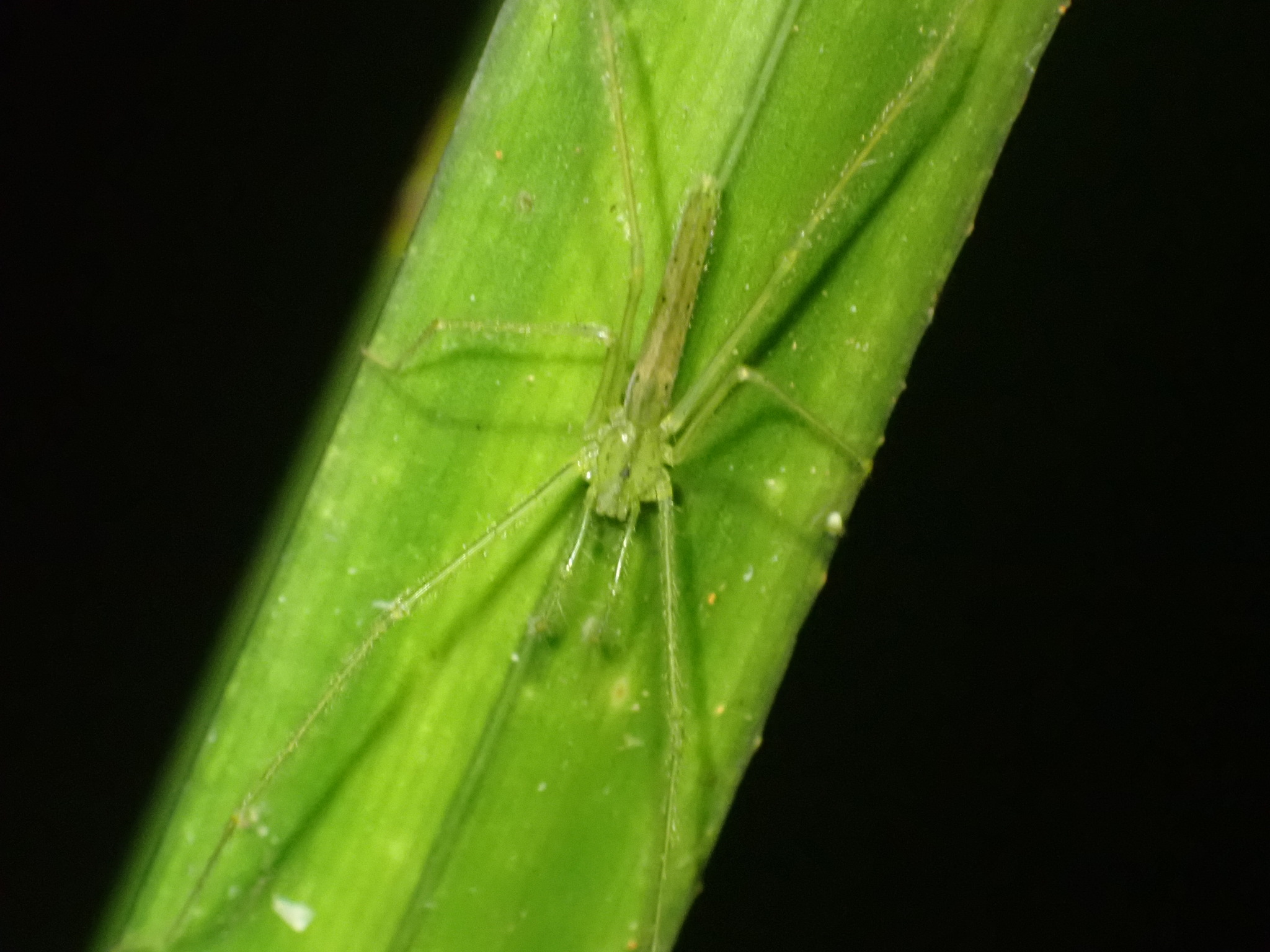

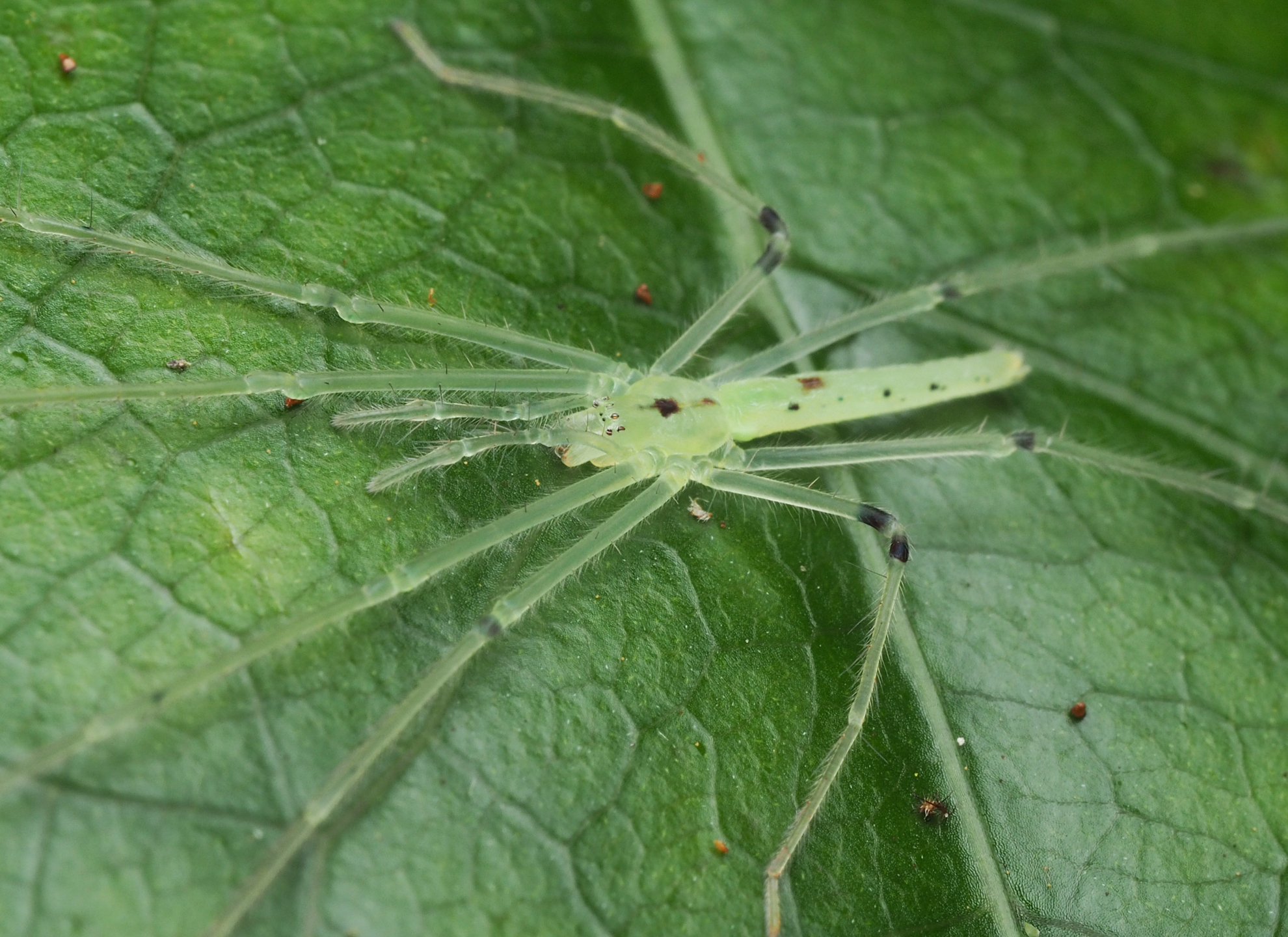

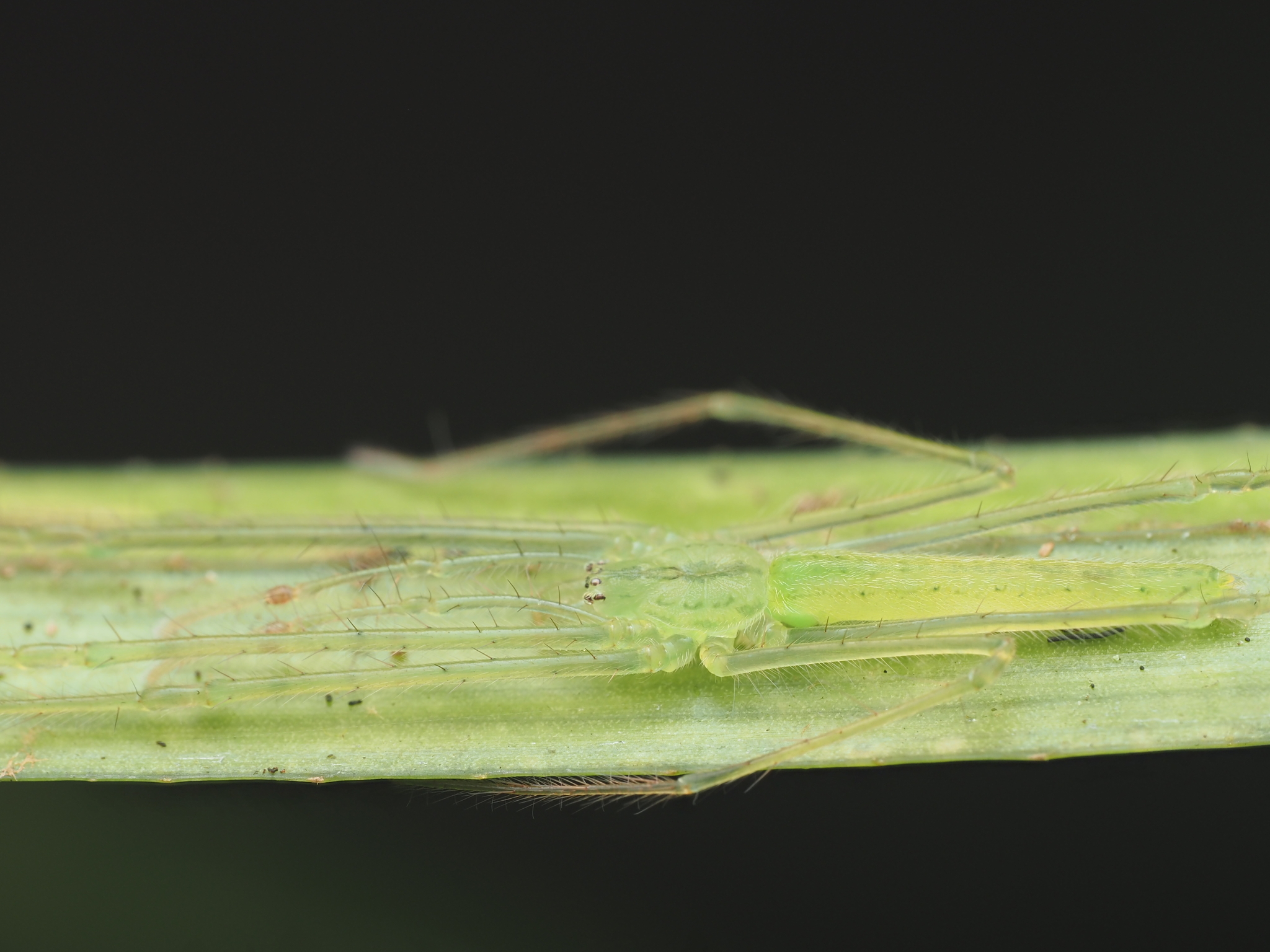
