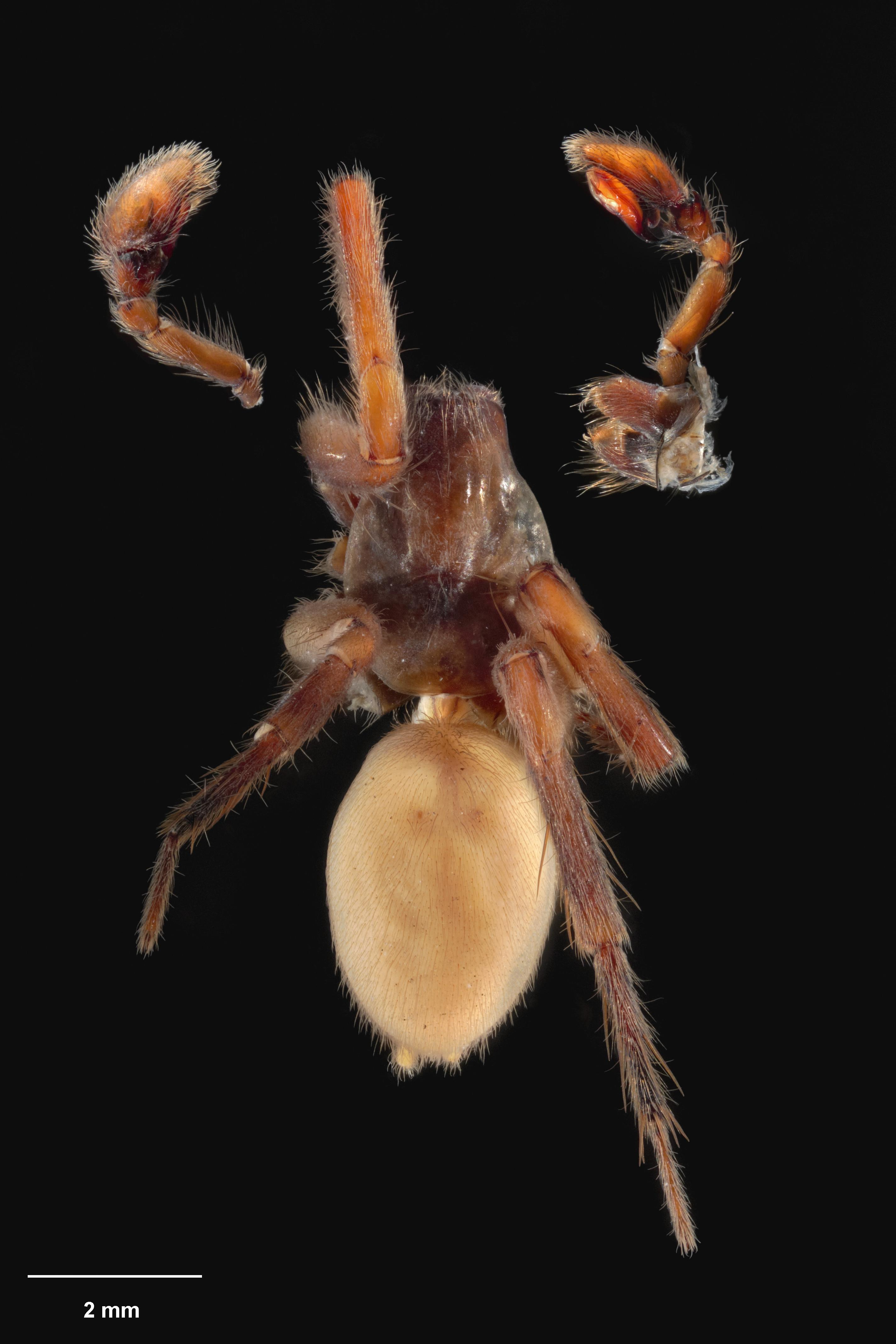

Conservation status
- Naturally Uncommon (NZ TCS)

Scientific classification
- Kingdom: Animalia
- Phylum: Arthropoda
- Subphylum: Chelicerata
- Class: Arachnida
- Order: Araneae
- Infraorder: Araneomorphae
- Family: Desidae
- Genus: Neororea
- Species: N. sorenseni

Binomial name
- Neororea sorenseni (Forster, 1955)

= Neororea sorenseni =

Species of spider

Neororea sorenseni is a species of spider in the family Desidae that is endemic to New Zealand.

== Taxonomy ==
This species was described by Ray Forster and Cecil Wilton in 1973 from female specimens. The holotype is stored in Te Papa Museum under registration number AS.000112.

== Description ==
The female is recorded at 8.51mm in length. The cephalothorax and legs are coloured pale brown. The abdomen is pale brown with a white chevron pattern dorsally.

== Distribution ==
This species is only known from the Auckland Islands, New Zealand.

== Conservation status ==
Under the New Zealand Threat Classification System, this species is listed as "Naturally Uncommon" with the qualifiers of "Island Endemic" and "Range Restricted".
