= Oparara vallus =

Conservation status
- Data Deficient (NZ TCS)

Scientific classification
- Domain: Eukaryota
- Kingdom: Animalia
- Phylum: Arthropoda
- Subphylum: Chelicerata
- Class: Arachnida
- Order: Araneae
- Infraorder: Araneomorphae
- Family: Desidae
- Genus: Oparara
- Species: O. vallus

Binomial name
- Oparara vallus (Marples, 1959)

Synonyms
- Ixeuticus vallus; Lathyarcha vallus

Species of spider

Oparara vallus is a species of spider in the family Desidae that is endemic to New Zealand.

== Taxonomy ==
This species was described as Ixeuticus vallus by Brian John Marples in 1959 from female and male specimens. It was most recently revised in 1973. The holotype is stored in Canterbury Museum.

== Description ==
The female is recorded at 5.16mm in length. The cephalothorax is coloured orange brown with black shading laterally. The legs are reddish brown with indistinct bands. The abdomen is darkly coloured.

== Distribution ==
This species is only known from Westland, New Zealand.

== Conservation status ==
Under the New Zealand Threat Classification System, this species is listed as "Not Threatened".
