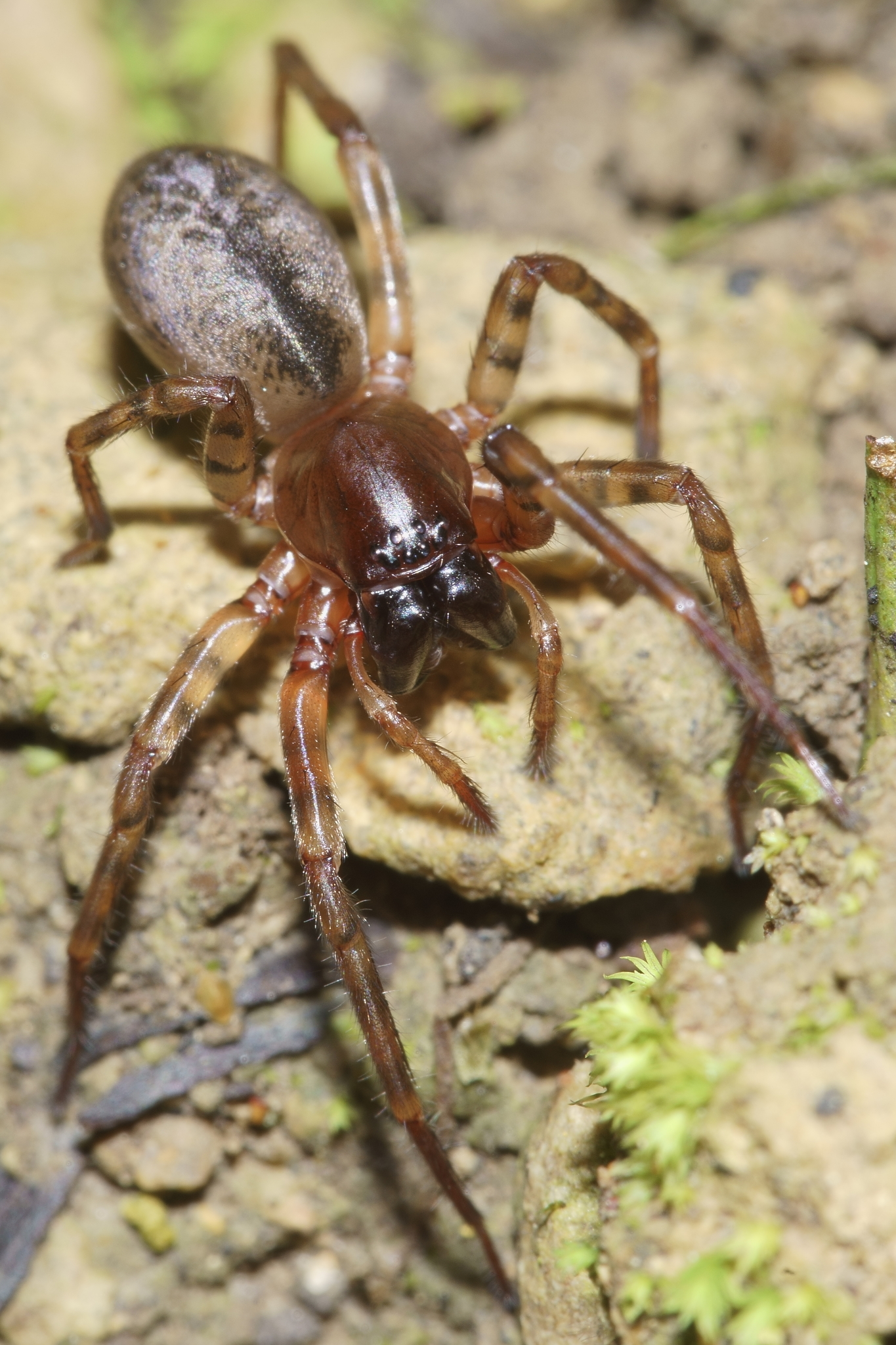

Conservation status
- Not Threatened (NZ TCS)

Scientific classification
- Kingdom: Animalia
- Phylum: Arthropoda
- Subphylum: Chelicerata
- Class: Arachnida
- Order: Araneae
- Infraorder: Araneomorphae
- Family: Desidae
- Genus: Nuisiana; Forster & Wilton, 1973
- Species: N. arboris

Binomial name
- Nuisiana arboris (Marples, 1959)

Synonyms
- Maniho arboris; Forsterina arboris; Matachia magna

= Nuisiana =

Genus of spiders

Nuisiana is a monotypic genus of South Pacific intertidal spiders containing the single species, Nuisiana arboris. It was first described by Raymond Robert Forster & C. L. Wilton in 1973, and has only been found in New Zealand.

== Taxonomy ==
This species was described in 1959 by Brian John Marples from female specimens. The Nuisiana genus was described in 1973 by Ray Forster and Cecil Wilton. The holotype is stored in the Otago Museum.

== Description ==
The female is recorded at 12.67mm in length. The carapace and legs are coloured yellow. The abdomen is yellowish with markings dorsally.

== Distribution ==
This species is known from scattered localities throughout New Zealand.

== Conservation status ==
Under the New Zealand Threat Classification System, this species is listed as "Not Threatened".
