= Corasoides =

Scientific classification
- Kingdom: Animalia
- Phylum: Arthropoda
- Subphylum: Chelicerata
- Class: Arachnida
- Order: Araneae
- Infraorder: Araneomorphae
- Family: Desidae
- Genus: Corasoides; Butler, 1929

Type species
- C. australis Butler, 1929

Species
- 10, see text

Genus of spiders

Corasoides is a genus of South Pacific intertidal spiders that was first described by Arthur Gardiner Butler in 1929. Originally placed with the Agelenidae, it was moved to the Stiphidiidae in 1973, and to the Desidae after a 2017 genetic study.

== Species ==
As of September 2019 it contains ten species, found in Australia and Papua New Guinea:

- Corasoides angusi Humphrey, 2017 – Papua New Guinea
- Corasoides australis Butler, 1929 (type) – Australia
- Corasoides cowanae Humphrey, 2017 – Papua New Guinea
- Corasoides motumae Humphrey, 2017 – Australia (New South Wales)
- Corasoides mouldsi Humphrey, 2017 – Australia (Queensland)
- Corasoides nebula Humphrey, 2017 – Papua New Guinea
- Corasoides nimbus Humphrey, 2017 – Papua New Guinea
- Corasoides occidentalis Humphrey, 2017 – Australia (Western Australia)
- Corasoides stellaris Humphrey, 2017 – Papua New Guinea
- Corasoides terania Humphrey, 2017 – Australia (Queensland, New South Wales)
