= Panoa tapanuiensis =

Conservation status
- Data Deficit (NZ TCS)

Scientific classification
- Kingdom: Animalia
- Phylum: Arthropoda
- Subphylum: Chelicerata
- Class: Arachnida
- Order: Araneae
- Infraorder: Araneomorphae
- Family: Desidae
- Genus: Panoa
- Species: P. tapanuiensis

Binomial name
- Panoa tapanuiensis Forster, 1970

Species of spider

Panoa tapanuiensis is a species of Desidae spider that is endemic to New Zealand.

== Taxonomy ==
This species was described by Ray Forster in 1970 from a female specimen. The holotype is stored in Otago Museum.

== Description ==
The female is recorded at 4.67mm in length. The carapace is coloured reddish brown. The legs are yellowish brown. The abdomen is mottled whitish.

== Distribution ==
This species is only known from Otago, New Zealand.

== Conservation status ==
Under the New Zealand Threat Classification System, this species is listed as "Data Deficient" with the qualifiers of "Data Poor: Size", "Data Poor: Trend" and "One Location".
