= Bakala episinoides =

Scientific classification
- Domain: Eukaryota
- Kingdom: Animalia
- Phylum: Arthropoda
- Subphylum: Chelicerata
- Class: Arachnida
- Order: Araneae
- Infraorder: Araneomorphae
- Family: Desidae
- Genus: Bakala
- Species: B. episinoides

Binomial name
- Bakala episinoides Davies, 1990

Genus of spiders

Bakala is a genus of Australian intertidal spiders containing the single species, Bakala episinoides. It was first described by V. T. Davies in 1990, and has only been found in Australia.
