= Mesudus =

Scientific classification
- Domain: Eukaryota
- Kingdom: Animalia
- Phylum: Arthropoda
- Subphylum: Chelicerata
- Class: Arachnida
- Order: Araneae
- Infraorder: Araneomorphae
- Family: Desidae
- Genus: Mesudus; Özdikmen, 2007

Type species
- M. solitarius (Forster, 1970)

Species
- M. frondosus (Forster, 1970) – New Zealand; M. setosus (Forster, 1970) – New Zealand; M. solitarius (Forster, 1970) – New Zealand

Genus of spiders

Mesudus is a genus of South Pacific intertidal spiders that was first described by H. Özdikmen in 2007. As of May 2019 it contains only three species, all found in New Zealand: M. frondosus, M. setosus, and M. solitarius.
