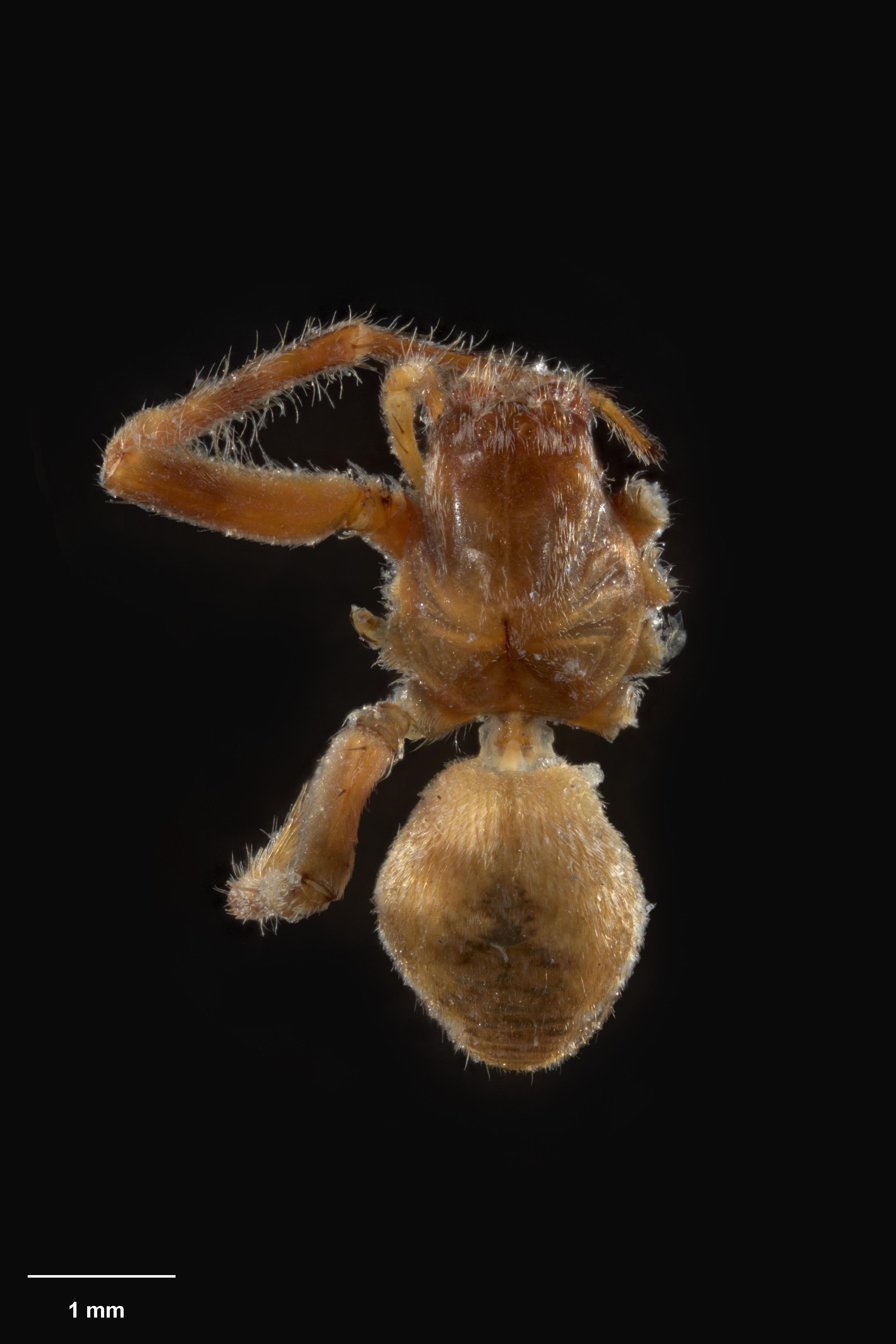

Conservation status
- Data Deficit (NZ TCS)

Scientific classification
- Kingdom: Animalia
- Phylum: Arthropoda
- Subphylum: Chelicerata
- Class: Arachnida
- Order: Araneae
- Infraorder: Araneomorphae
- Family: Desidae
- Genus: Panoa
- Species: P. mora

Binomial name
- Panoa mora Forster, 1970

= Panoa mora =

Species of spider

Panoa mora is a species of Desidae spider that is endemic to New Zealand.

== Taxonomy ==
This species was described by Ray Forster in 1970 from a female specimen. The holotype is stored in Te Papa Museum under registration number AS.000072.

== Description ==
The female is recorded at 4.84mm in length. The carapace and legs are dark reddish brown. The abdomen is cream with a dark patch dorsally.

== Distribution ==
This species is only known from Nelson, New Zealand.

== Conservation status ==
Under the New Zealand Threat Classification System, this species is listed as "Data Deficient" with the qualifiers of "Data Poor: Size", "Data Poor: Trend" and "One Location".
