= Akatorea gracilis =

Conservation status
- Not Threatened (NZ TCS)

Scientific classification
- Domain: Eukaryota
- Kingdom: Animalia
- Phylum: Arthropoda
- Subphylum: Chelicerata
- Class: Arachnida
- Order: Araneae
- Infraorder: Araneomorphae
- Family: Desidae
- Genus: Akatorea
- Species: A. gracilis

Binomial name
- Akatorea gracilis (Marples, 1959)

Synonyms
- Maniho gracilis

Species of spider

Akatorea gracilis is a species of Desidae that is endemic to New Zealand.

== Taxonomy ==
This species was described as Maniho gracilis by Brian John Marples from female specimens. It was most recently revised in 1973. The holotype is stored in Otago Museum.

== Description ==
The female is recorded at 9.39mm in length. The carapace is coloured orange yellow. The legs are yellow brown. The abdomen is grey with a cross pattern dorsally.

== Distribution ==
This species is only known from Stewart Island and the southern end of New Zealand's South Island.

== Conservation status ==
Under the New Zealand Threat Classification System, this species is listed as "Not Threatened".
