= Mesudus setosus =

Conservation status
- Data Deficit (NZ TCS)

Scientific classification
- Kingdom: Animalia
- Phylum: Arthropoda
- Subphylum: Chelicerata
- Class: Arachnida
- Order: Araneae
- Infraorder: Araneomorphae
- Family: Desidae
- Genus: Mesudus
- Species: M. setosus

Binomial name
- Mesudus setosus (Forster, 1970)

Synonyms
- Manawa setosa

Species of spider

Mesudus setosus is a species of Desidae spider that is endemic to New Zealand.

== Taxonomy ==
This species was described as Manawa setosa by Ray Forster in 1970 from a male specimen. It was moved to the Mesudus genus in 2007. The holotype is stored in Te Papa Museum.

== Description ==
The male is recorded at 6.46mm in length. This species is uniform yellow brown and lacks markings.

== Distribution ==
This species is only known from Fiordland, New Zealand.

== Conservation status ==
Under the New Zealand Threat Classification System, this species is listed as "Data Deficient" with the qualifiers of "Data Poor: Size", "Data Poor: Trend" and "One Location".
