= Rorea =

Scientific classification
- Kingdom: Animalia
- Phylum: Arthropoda
- Subphylum: Chelicerata
- Class: Arachnida
- Order: Araneae
- Infraorder: Araneomorphae
- Family: Desidae
- Genus: Rorea; Forster & Wilton, 1973

Type species
- R. aucklandensis Forster & Wilton, 1973

Species
- R. aucklandensis Forster & Wilton, 1973 – New Zealand (Auckland Is.); R. otagoensis Forster & Wilton, 1973 – New Zealand

Genus of spiders

Rorea is a genus of intertidal spiders first described by Raymond Robert Forster & C. L. Wilton in 1973. As of April 2019 it contains only two species, both found in New Zealand.
