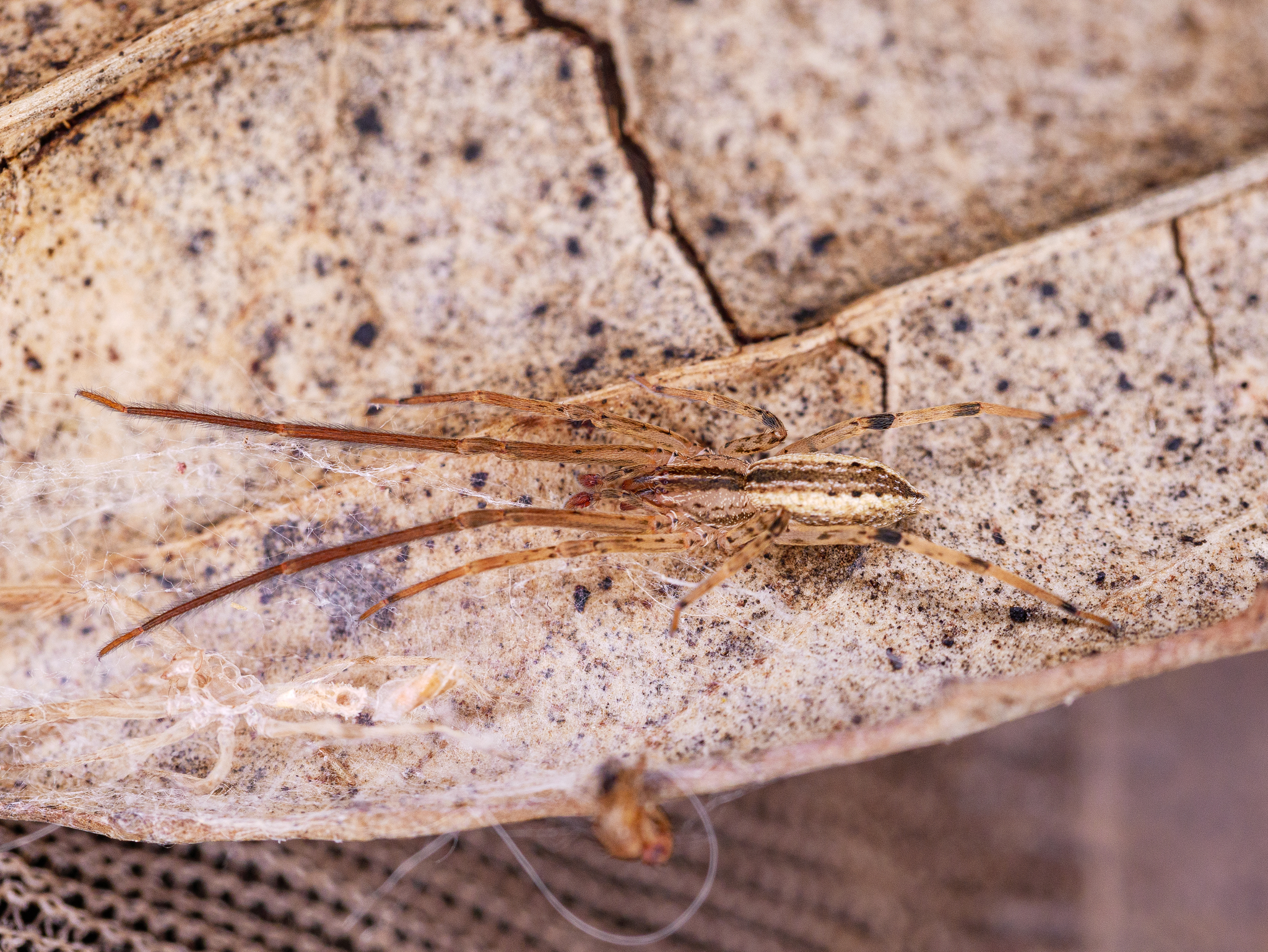

Conservation status
- Not Threatened (NZ TCS)

Scientific classification
- Kingdom: Animalia
- Phylum: Arthropoda
- Subphylum: Chelicerata
- Class: Arachnida
- Order: Araneae
- Infraorder: Araneomorphae
- Family: Desidae
- Genus: Poaka
- Species: P. graminicola

Binomial name
- Poaka graminicola Forster & Wilton, 1973

= Poaka graminicola =

Genus of spiders

Poaka is a genus of intertidal spiders containing the single species, Poaka graminicola endemic to New Zealand.

== Taxonomy ==
This species was described in 1973 by Ray Forster and Cecil Wilton from male and female specimens. The holotype is stored in Otago Museum.

== Description ==
The female is recorded at 4.85mm in length whereas the male is 4.40mm. The carapace is coloured pale with black bands dorsally. The legs are pale with dark patches. The abdomen is dark olive with a variety of markings dorsally.

== Distribution ==
This species is widespread in New Zealand.

== Conservation status ==
Under the New Zealand Threat Classification System, this species is listed as "Not Threatened".
