= Tuakana mirada =

Conservation status
- Data Deficit (NZ TCS)

Scientific classification
- Kingdom: Animalia
- Phylum: Arthropoda
- Subphylum: Chelicerata
- Class: Arachnida
- Order: Araneae
- Infraorder: Araneomorphae
- Family: Desidae
- Genus: Tuakana
- Species: T. mirada

Binomial name
- Tuakana mirada Forster, 1970

Species of spider

Tuakana mirada is a species of Desidae spider that is endemic to New Zealand.

== Taxonomy ==
This species was described by Ray Forster in 1970 from male specimens. The holotype is stored in Otago Museum.

== Description ==
The size of the male is unknown. The cephalothorax and legs are coloured reddish brown.

== Distribution ==
This species is only known from Fiordland and Otago in New Zealand.

== Conservation status ==
Under the New Zealand Threat Classification System, this species is listed as "Data Deficient" with the qualifiers of "Data Poor: Size" and "Data Poor: Trend".
