= Mesudus frondosus =

Conservation status
- Data Deficit (NZ TCS)

Scientific classification
- Kingdom: Animalia
- Phylum: Arthropoda
- Subphylum: Chelicerata
- Class: Arachnida
- Order: Araneae
- Infraorder: Araneomorphae
- Family: Desidae
- Genus: Mesudus
- Species: M. frondosus

Binomial name
- Mesudus frondosus (Forster, 1970)

Synonyms
- Manawa frondosa

Species of spider

Mesudus frondosus is a species of Desidae spider that is endemic to New Zealand.

== Taxonomy ==
This species was described as Manawa frondosa by Ray Forster in 1970 from a female specimen. It was moved to the Mesudus genus in 2007. The holotype is stored in Otago Museum.

== Description ==
The female is recorded at 7.2mm in length. The cephalothorax and legs are coloured pale orange brown. The abdomen is creamy with dark brown patches.

== Distribution ==
This species is only known from Fiordland, New Zealand.

== Conservation status ==
Under the New Zealand Threat Classification System, this species is listed as "Data Deficient" with the qualifiers of "Data Poor: Size", "Data Poor: Trend" and "One Location".
