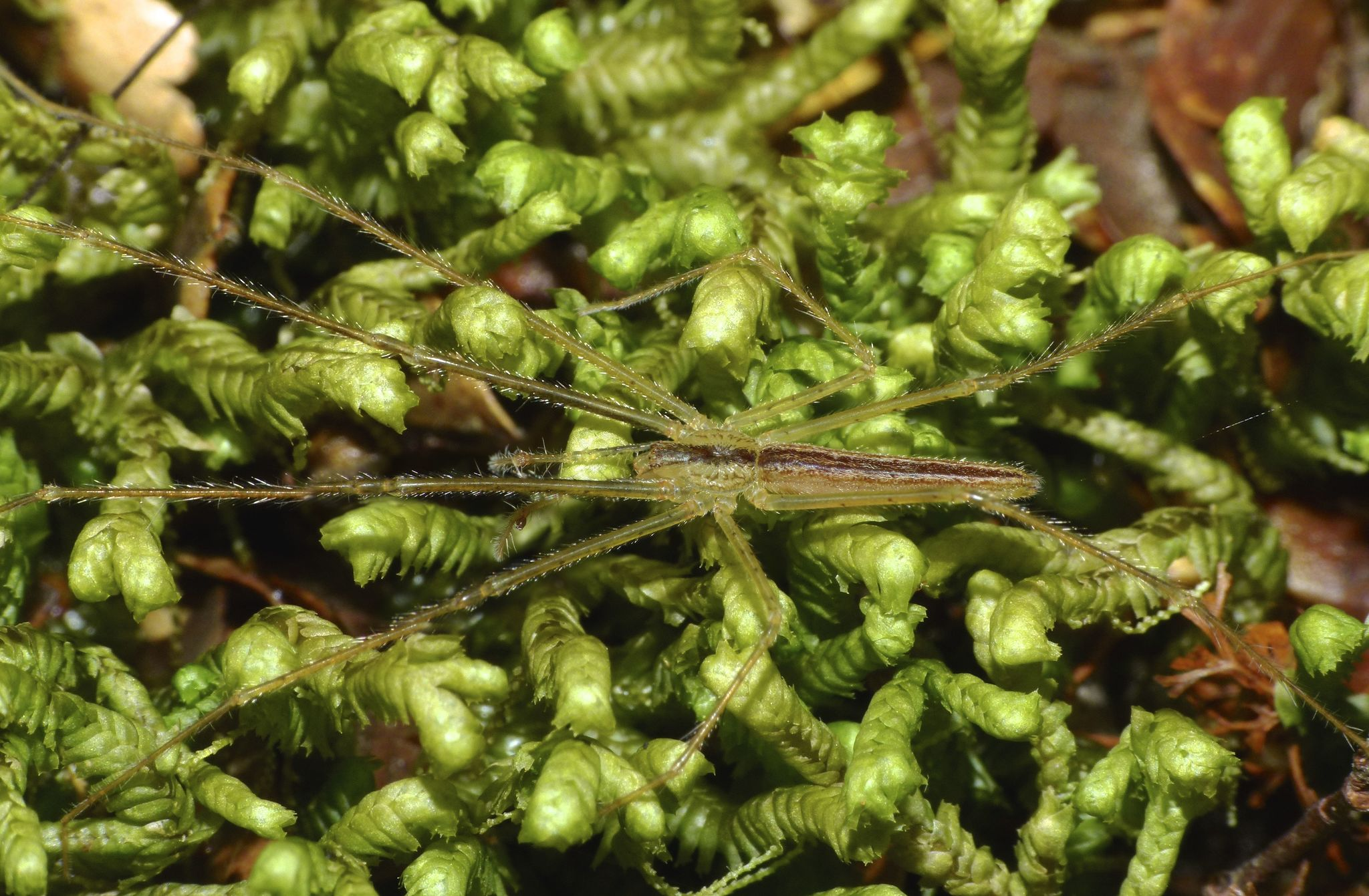
- Ischalea spinipes

Scientific classification
- Kingdom: Animalia
- Phylum: Arthropoda
- Subphylum: Chelicerata
- Class: Arachnida
- Order: Araneae
- Infraorder: Araneomorphae
- Family: Desidae
- Genus: Ischalea; L. Koch, 1872

Type species
- I. spinipes L. Koch, 1872

Species
- I. incerta (O. Pickard-Cambridge, 1877) – Madagascar; I. longiceps Simon, 1898 – Mauritius; I. spinipes L. Koch, 1872 – New Zealand

= Ischalea =

Genus of spiders

Ischalea is a genus of intertidal spiders that was first described by Ludwig Carl Christian Koch in 1872. As of September 2019 it contains three species, found in Mauritius, on Madagascar, and the Polynesian Islands: I. incerta, I. longiceps, and I. spinipes. Originally placed with the Pisauridae, it was moved to the Stiphidiidae in 1973, and to the Desidae after a 2017 genetic study.
