= Syrorisa =

Scientific classification
- Kingdom: Animalia
- Phylum: Arthropoda
- Subphylum: Chelicerata
- Class: Arachnida
- Order: Araneae
- Infraorder: Araneomorphae
- Family: Desidae
- Genus: Syrorisa; Simon, 1908
- Species: S. misella

Binomial name
- Syrorisa misella (Simon, 1906)

Genus of spiders

Syrorisa is a monotypic genus of South Pacific intertidal spiders containing the single species, Syrorisa misella. It was first described by Eugène Simon in 1908, and has only been found on New Caledonia and Australia. Originally placed in the Amaurobiidae, it was moved to the Desidae in 1967.
