= Mangareia motu =

Conservation status
- Data Deficit (NZ TCS)

Scientific classification
- Kingdom: Animalia
- Phylum: Arthropoda
- Subphylum: Chelicerata
- Class: Arachnida
- Order: Araneae
- Infraorder: Araneomorphae
- Family: Desidae
- Genus: Mangareia
- Species: M. motu

Binomial name
- Mangareia motu Forster, 1970

Species of spider

Mangareia motu is a species of Desidae spider that is endemic to New Zealand.

== Taxonomy ==
This species was described in 1970 by Ray Forster from male and specimens. The holotype is stored in Te Papa Museum under registration number AS.000073.

== Description ==
The female is recorded at 6.40mm in length whereas the male is 5.60mm.

== Distribution ==
This species is only known from Marlborough and Wairarapa in New Zealand.

== Conservation status ==
Under the New Zealand Threat Classification System, this species is listed as "Data Deficient" with the qualifiers of "Data Poor: Size" and "Data Poor: Trend".
