= Porteria =

Scientific classification
- Kingdom: Animalia
- Phylum: Arthropoda
- Subphylum: Chelicerata
- Class: Arachnida
- Order: Araneae
- Infraorder: Araneomorphae
- Family: Desidae
- Subfamily: Porteriinae
- Genus: Porteria; Simon, 1904

Type species
- P. albopunctata Simon, 1904

Species
- 12, see text

Genus of spiders

Porteria is a genus of South American intertidal spiders first described by Eugène Simon in 1904.

== Species ==
As of November 2024 it contains 12 species, all found in Chile:

- Porteria ajimayo Morrill, Crews, Esposito, Ramírez & Griswold, 2023 — Chile
- Porteria albopunctata Simon, 1904 (type) — Chile
- Porteria alopobre Morrill, Crews, Esposito, Ramírez & Griswold, 2023 — Chile
- Porteria ariasbohartae Morrill, Crews, Esposito, Ramírez & Griswold, 2023 — Chile
- Porteria bunnyana Morrill, Crews, Esposito, Ramírez & Griswold, 2023 — Chile
- Porteria contulmo Morrill, Crews, Esposito, Ramírez & Griswold, 2023 — Chile
- Porteria correcaminos Morrill, Crews, Esposito, Ramírez & Griswold, 2023 — Chile
- Porteria eddardstarki Morrill, Crews, Esposito, Ramírez & Griswold, 2023 — Chile
- Porteria faberi Morrill, Crews, Esposito, Ramírez & Griswold, 2023 — Chile
- Porteria fiura Morrill, Crews, Esposito, Ramírez & Griswold, 2023 — Chile
- Porteria misbianka Morrill, Crews, Esposito, Ramírez & Griswold, 2023 — Chile
- Porteria torobayo Morrill, Crews, Esposito, Ramírez & Griswold, 2023 — Chile
