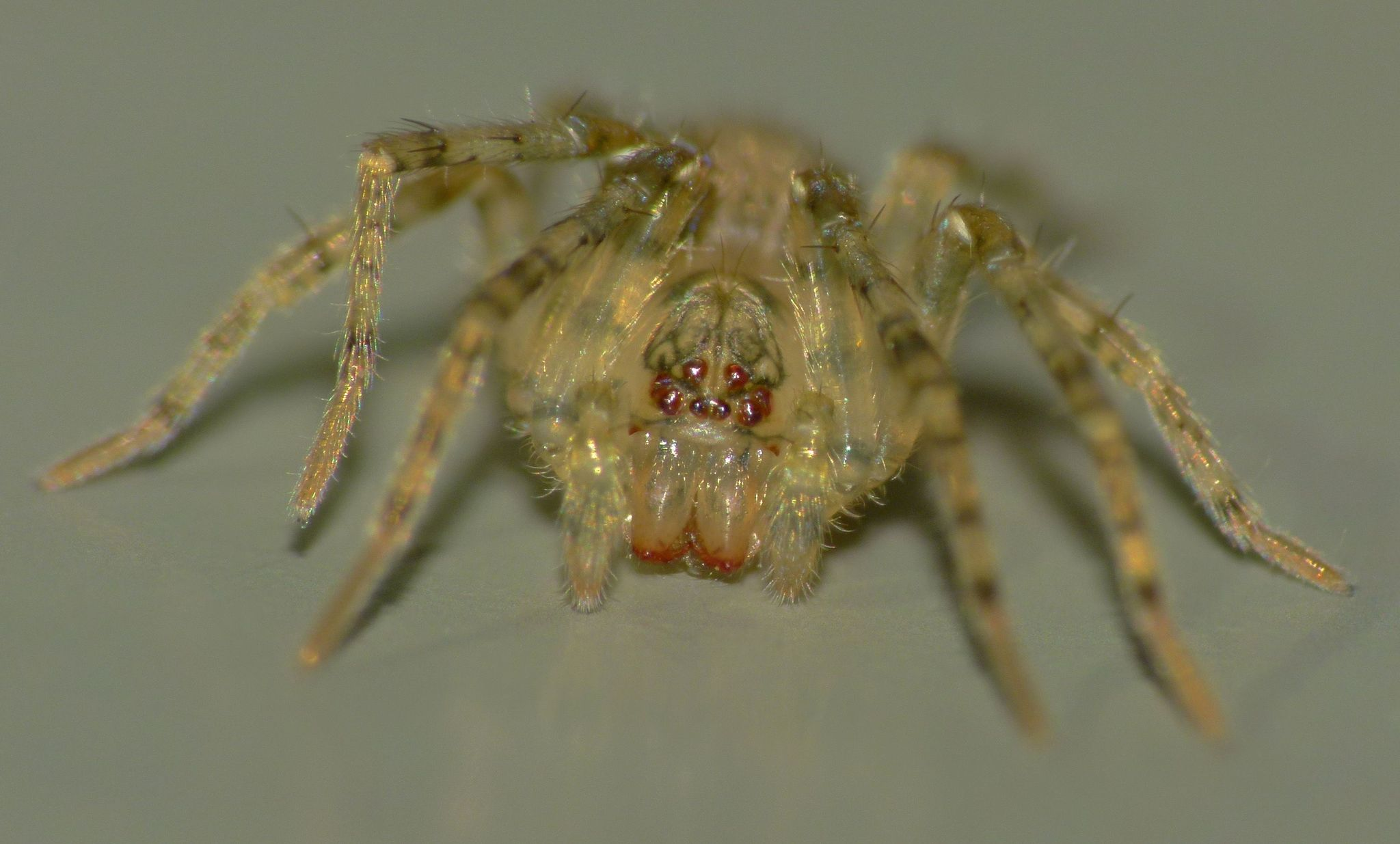

Conservation status
- Not Threatened (NZ TCS)

Scientific classification
- Kingdom: Animalia
- Phylum: Arthropoda
- Subphylum: Chelicerata
- Class: Arachnida
- Order: Araneae
- Infraorder: Araneomorphae
- Family: Desidae
- Genus: Rapua; Forster, 1970
- Species: R. australis

Binomial name
- Rapua australis Forster, 1970

= Rapua =

Genus of spiders

Rapua is a monotypic genus of intertidal spiders containing the single species, Rapua australis. It is endemic to New Zealand.

== Taxonomy ==
This genus was described by Ray Forster in 1970 from male and female specimens. The holotype is stored in Canterbury Museum.

== Description ==
The male is recorded at 8mm in length whereas the female is 8.2mm. The carapace is coloured reddish brown. The legs are orange brown. The abdomen is creamy with dark patches.

== Distribution ==
This species is only known from Stewart Island and the South Island of New Zealand.

== Conservation status ==
Under the New Zealand Threat Classification System, this species is listed as "Not Threatened".
