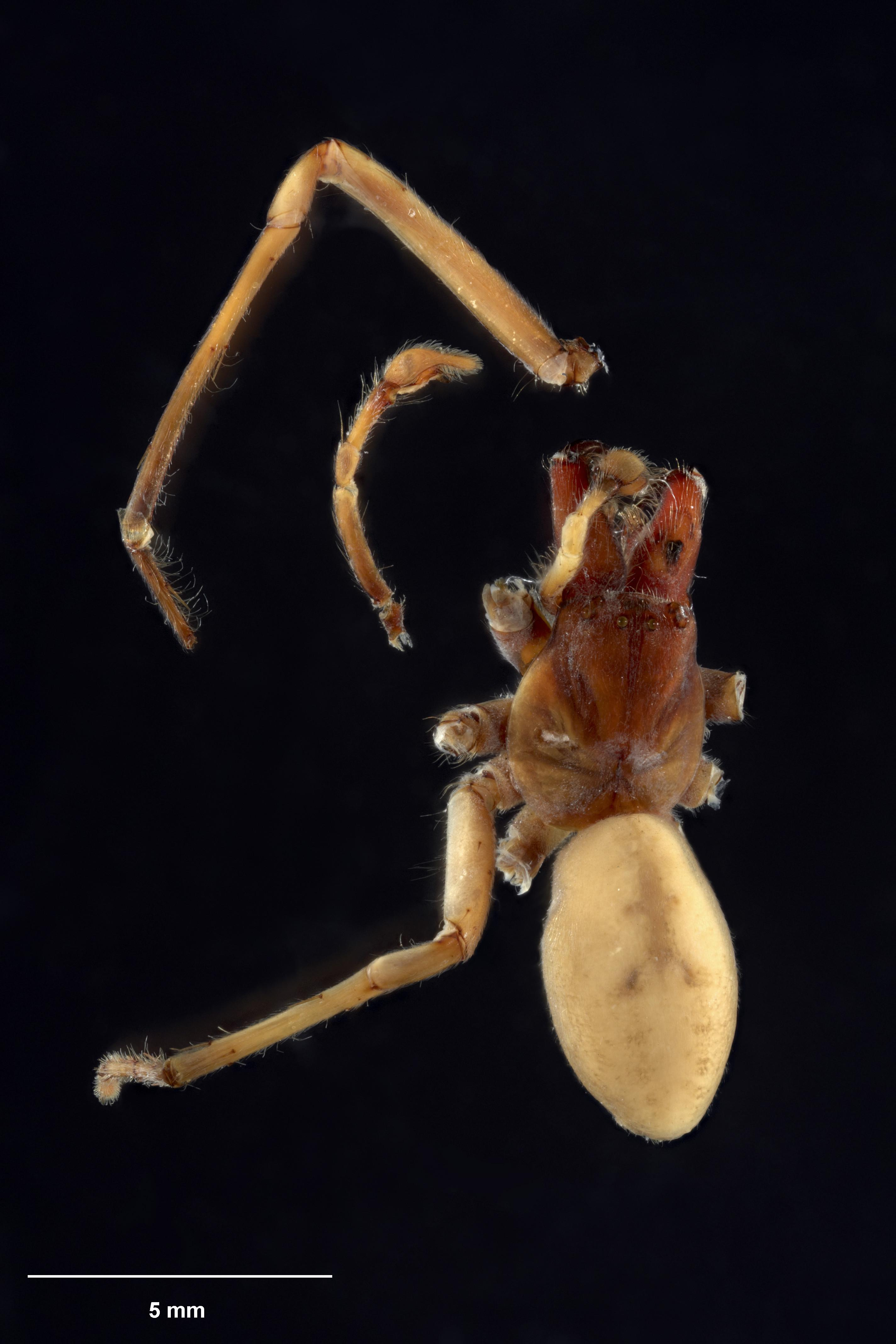

Conservation status
- Data Deficit (NZ TCS)

Scientific classification
- Kingdom: Animalia
- Phylum: Arthropoda
- Subphylum: Chelicerata
- Class: Arachnida
- Order: Araneae
- Infraorder: Araneomorphae
- Family: Desidae
- Genus: Helsonia; Forster, 1970
- Species: H. plata

Binomial name
- Helsonia plata Forster, 1970

= Helsonia =

Genus of spiders

Helsonia is a monotypic genus of South Pacific intertidal spiders containing the single species, Helsonia plata. It was first described by Raymond Robert Forster in 1970, and has only been found in New Zealand.

== Taxonomy ==
This species was described in 1970 by Ray Forster from a male specimen. The holotype is stored in Te Papa Museum under registration number AS.000086.

== Description ==
The male is recorded at 9.60mm in length. The cephalothorax and legs are coloured reddish brown. The abdomen is creamy with darker markings dorsally.

== Distribution ==
This species is only known from Mount Arthur in New Zealand.

== Conservation status ==
Under the New Zealand Threat Classification System, this species is listed as "Data Deficient" with the qualifiers of "Data Poor: Size" and "Data Poor: Trend" and "One Location".
