= Mangareia maculata =

Conservation status
- Data Deficit (NZ TCS)

Scientific classification
- Kingdom: Animalia
- Phylum: Arthropoda
- Subphylum: Chelicerata
- Class: Arachnida
- Order: Araneae
- Infraorder: Araneomorphae
- Family: Desidae
- Genus: Mangareia
- Species: M. maculata

Binomial name
- Mangareia maculata Forster, 1970

Species of spider

Mangareia maculata is a species of Desidae spider that is endemic to New Zealand.

== Taxonomy ==
This species was described in 1970 by Ray Forster from male and specimens. The holotype is stored in Otago Museum.

== Description ==
The female is recorded at 5.01mm in length whereas the male is 4.25mm. The carapace and legs are coloured yellowish brown. The abdomen is patterned dorsally.

== Distribution ==
This species is only known from Otago, New Zealand.

== Conservation status ==
Under the New Zealand Threat Classification System, this species is listed as "Data Deficient" with the qualifiers of "Data Poor: Size", "Data Poor: Trend" and "One Location".
