= Mangareia =

Scientific classification
- Domain: Eukaryota
- Kingdom: Animalia
- Phylum: Arthropoda
- Subphylum: Chelicerata
- Class: Arachnida
- Order: Araneae
- Infraorder: Araneomorphae
- Family: Desidae
- Genus: Mangareia; Forster, 1970

Type species
- M. maculata Forster, 1970

Species
- M. maculata Forster, 1970 – New Zealand; M. motu Forster, 1970 – New Zealand

Genus of spiders

Mangareia is a genus of South Pacific intertidal spiders that was first described by Raymond Robert Forster in 1970. As of May 2019 it contains only two species, both found in New Zealand: M. maculata and M. motu.
