= Notomatachia cantuaria =

Conservation status
- Not Threatened (NZ TCS)

Scientific classification
- Kingdom: Animalia
- Phylum: Arthropoda
- Subphylum: Chelicerata
- Class: Arachnida
- Order: Araneae
- Infraorder: Araneomorphae
- Family: Desidae
- Genus: Notomatachia
- Species: N. cantuaria

Binomial name
- Notomatachia cantuaria Forster, 1970

Species of spider

Notomatachia cantuaria is a species of Desidae spider that is endemic to New Zealand.

== Taxonomy ==
This species was described by Ray Forster in 1970 from male and female specimens. The holotype is stored in Otago Museum.

== Description ==
The male is recorded at 5.35mm in length whereas the female is 7.03mm.

== Distribution ==
This species is only known from Canterbury, New Zealand.

== Conservation status ==
Under the New Zealand Threat Classification System, this species is listed as "Not Threatened".
