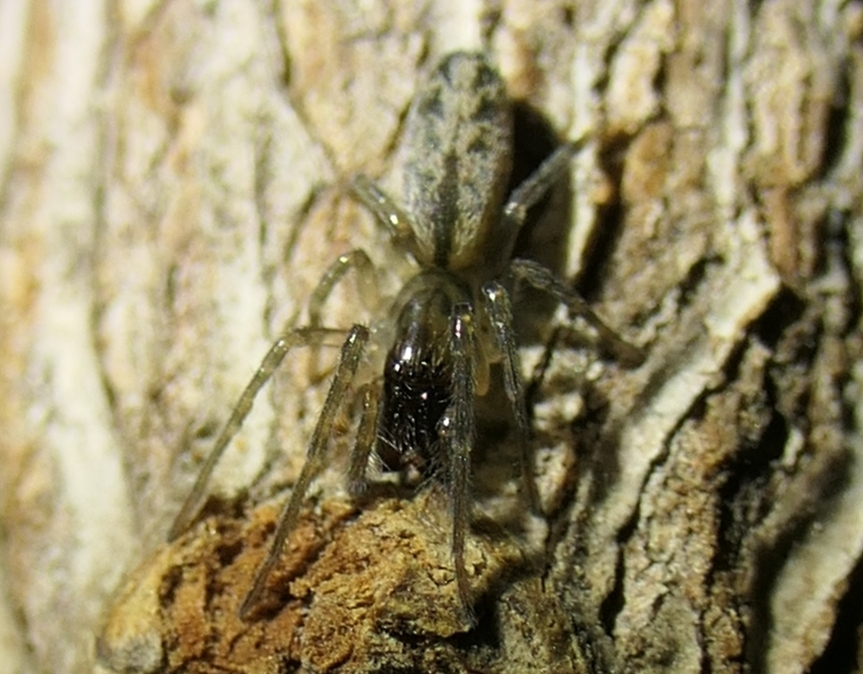

Conservation status
- Not Threatened (NZ TCS)

Scientific classification
- Domain: Eukaryota
- Kingdom: Animalia
- Phylum: Arthropoda
- Subphylum: Chelicerata
- Class: Arachnida
- Order: Araneae
- Infraorder: Araneomorphae
- Family: Desidae
- Genus: Notomatachia
- Species: N. hirsuta

Binomial name
- Notomatachia hirsuta (Marples, 1962)

Synonyms
- Matachia hirsuta; Notiomachia hirsuta

= Notomatachia hirsuta =

Species of spider

Notomatachia hirsuta is a species of Desidae spider that is endemic to New Zealand.

== Taxonomy ==
This species was described as Matachia hirsuta by Brian John Marples in 1962 from male and female specimens. It was most recently revised in 1970. The holotype is stored in Otago Museum.

== Description ==
The male is recorded at 6.63mm in length whereas the female is 6.29mm.

== Distribution ==
This species is only known from the southern end of New Zealand's South Island.

== Conservation status ==
Under the New Zealand Threat Classification System, this species is listed as "Not Threatened".
