= Pitonga woolowa =

Scientific classification
- Domain: Eukaryota
- Kingdom: Animalia
- Phylum: Arthropoda
- Subphylum: Chelicerata
- Class: Arachnida
- Order: Araneae
- Infraorder: Araneomorphae
- Family: Desidae
- Genus: Pitonga; Davies, 1984
- Species: P. woolowa

Binomial name
- Pitonga woolowa Davies, 1984

Genus of spiders

Pitonga is a monotypic genus of intertidal spiders containing the single species, Pitonga woolowa. It was first described by V. T. Davies in 1984, and has only been found in Northern Australia.
