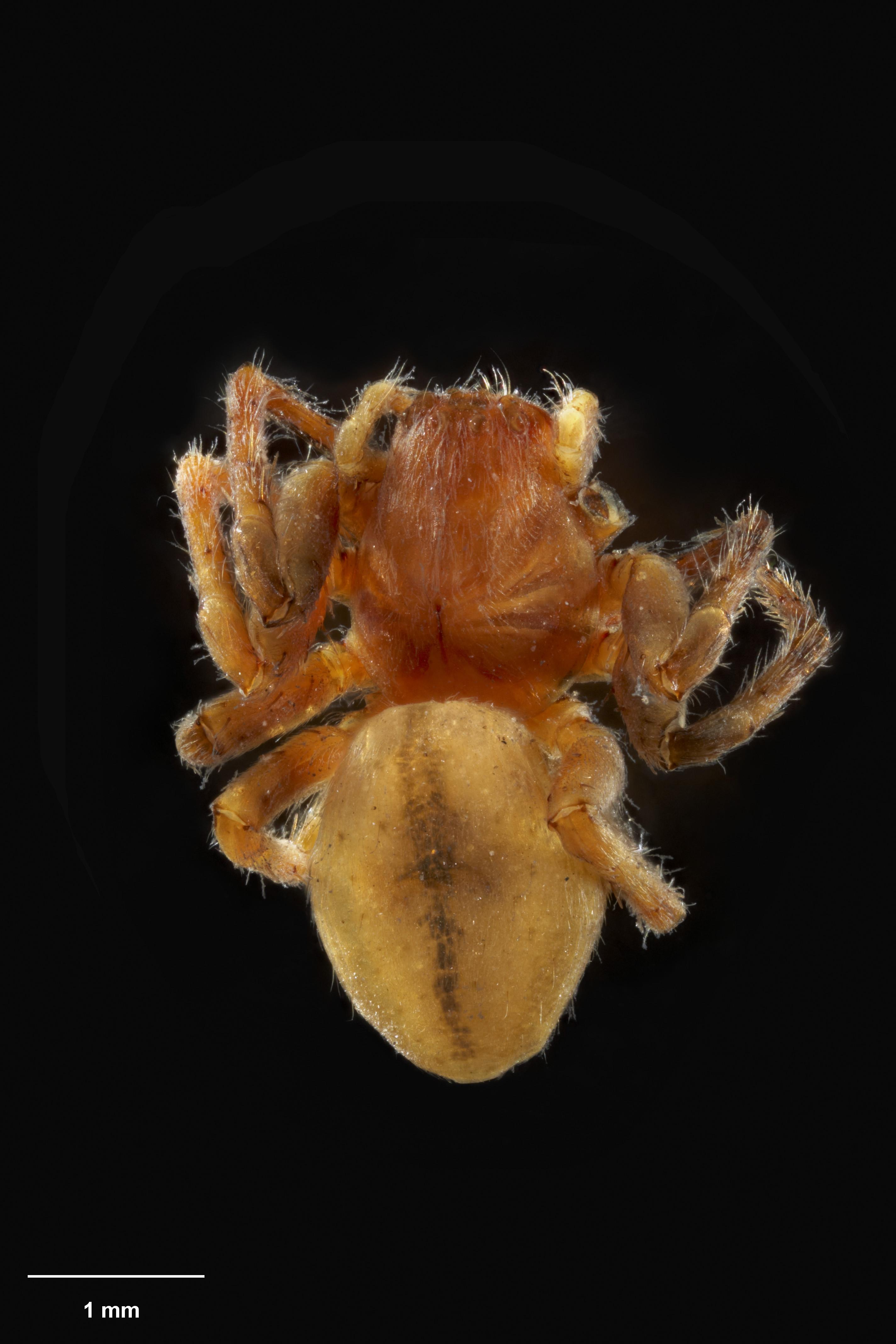

Conservation status
- Not Threatened (NZ TCS)

Scientific classification
- Domain: Eukaryota
- Kingdom: Animalia
- Phylum: Arthropoda
- Subphylum: Chelicerata
- Class: Arachnida
- Order: Araneae
- Infraorder: Araneomorphae
- Family: Desidae
- Genus: Panoa
- Species: P. fiordensis

Binomial name
- Panoa fiordensis Forster, 1970

= Panoa fiordensis =

Species of spider

Panoa fiordensis is a species of Desidae spider that is endemic to New Zealand.

== Taxonomy ==
This species was described by Ray Forster in 1970 from female specimens. The holotype is stored in Te Papa Museum under registration number AS.000026.

== Description ==
The female is recorded at 4.25mm in length. The carapace and legs are dark yellowish brown. The abdomen is creamy and sometimes has a band dorsally.

== Distribution ==
This species is only known from Fiordland, New Zealand.

== Conservation status ==
Under the New Zealand Threat Classification System, this species is listed as "Not Threatened".
