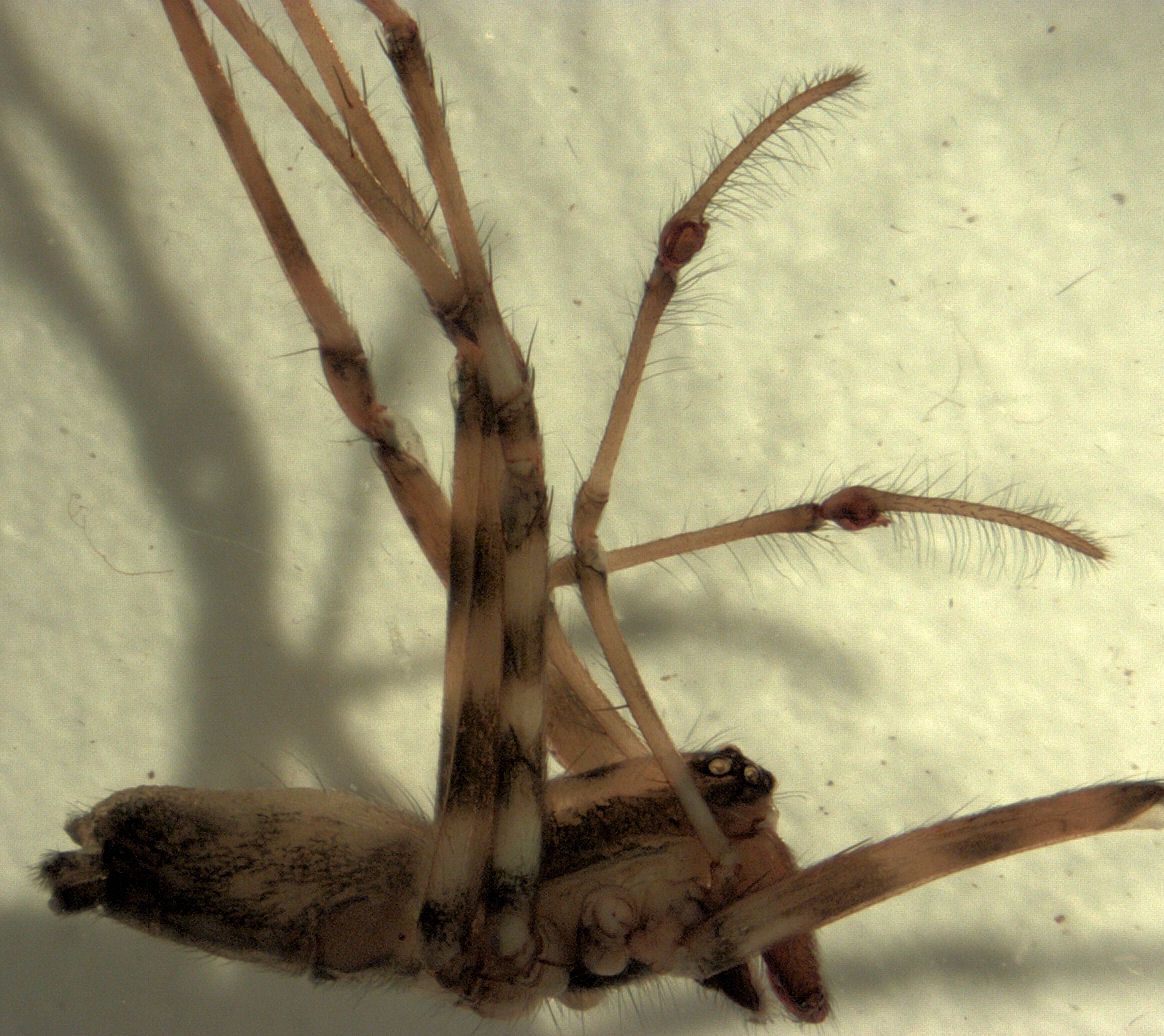
- N. gracilipes, male

Scientific classification
- Kingdom: Animalia
- Phylum: Arthropoda
- Subphylum: Chelicerata
- Class: Arachnida
- Order: Araneae
- Infraorder: Araneomorphae
- Family: Desidae
- Genus: Nanocambridgea; Forster & Wilton, 1973
- Species: N. gracilipes

Binomial name
- Nanocambridgea gracilipes Forster & Wilton, 1973

= Nanocambridgea =

Genus of spiders

Nanocambridgea is a monotypic genus of intertidal spiders containing the single species, Nanocambridgea gracilipes. It was first described by Raymond Robert Forster & C. L. Wilton in 1973, and is found on New Zealand. Originally placed with the Stiphidiidae, it was moved to the Desidae after a 2017 genetic study. A male described as N. grandis in 2000 was synonymized with Cambridgea reinga in 2011.
