= Magua wiangaree =

Scientific classification
- Domain: Eukaryota
- Kingdom: Animalia
- Phylum: Arthropoda
- Subphylum: Chelicerata
- Class: Arachnida
- Order: Araneae
- Infraorder: Araneomorphae
- Family: Desidae
- Genus: Magua; Davies, 1998
- Species: M. wiangaree

Binomial name
- Magua wiangaree Davies, 1998

Genus of spiders

Magua is a genus of Australian intertidal spiders containing the single species, Magua wiangaree. It was first described by V. T. Davies in 1998, and has only been found in Australia.
