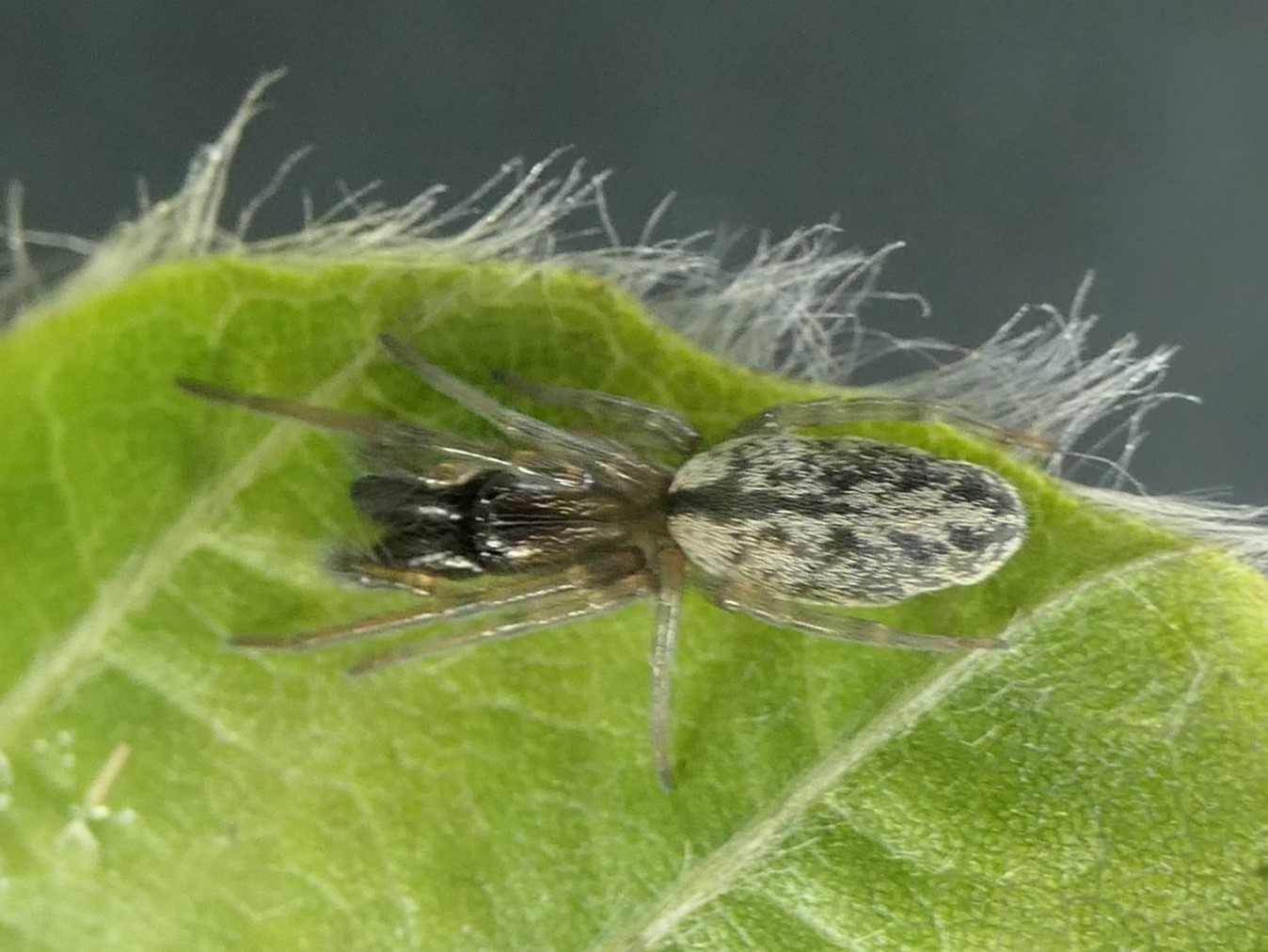
- Notomatachia hirsuta

Scientific classification
- Domain: Eukaryota
- Kingdom: Animalia
- Phylum: Arthropoda
- Subphylum: Chelicerata
- Class: Arachnida
- Order: Araneae
- Infraorder: Araneomorphae
- Family: Desidae
- Genus: Notomatachia; Forster, 1970

Type species
- N. hirsuta (Marples, 1962)

Species
- See text

= Notomatachia =

Genus of spiders

Notomatachia is a genus of South Pacific intertidal spiders that was first described by Raymond Robert Forster in 1970. As of May 2019 it contains only three species, all found in New Zealand:

- Notomatachia cantuaria Forster, 1970
- Notomatachia hirsuta (Marples, 1962)
- Notomatachia wiltoni Forster, 1970
