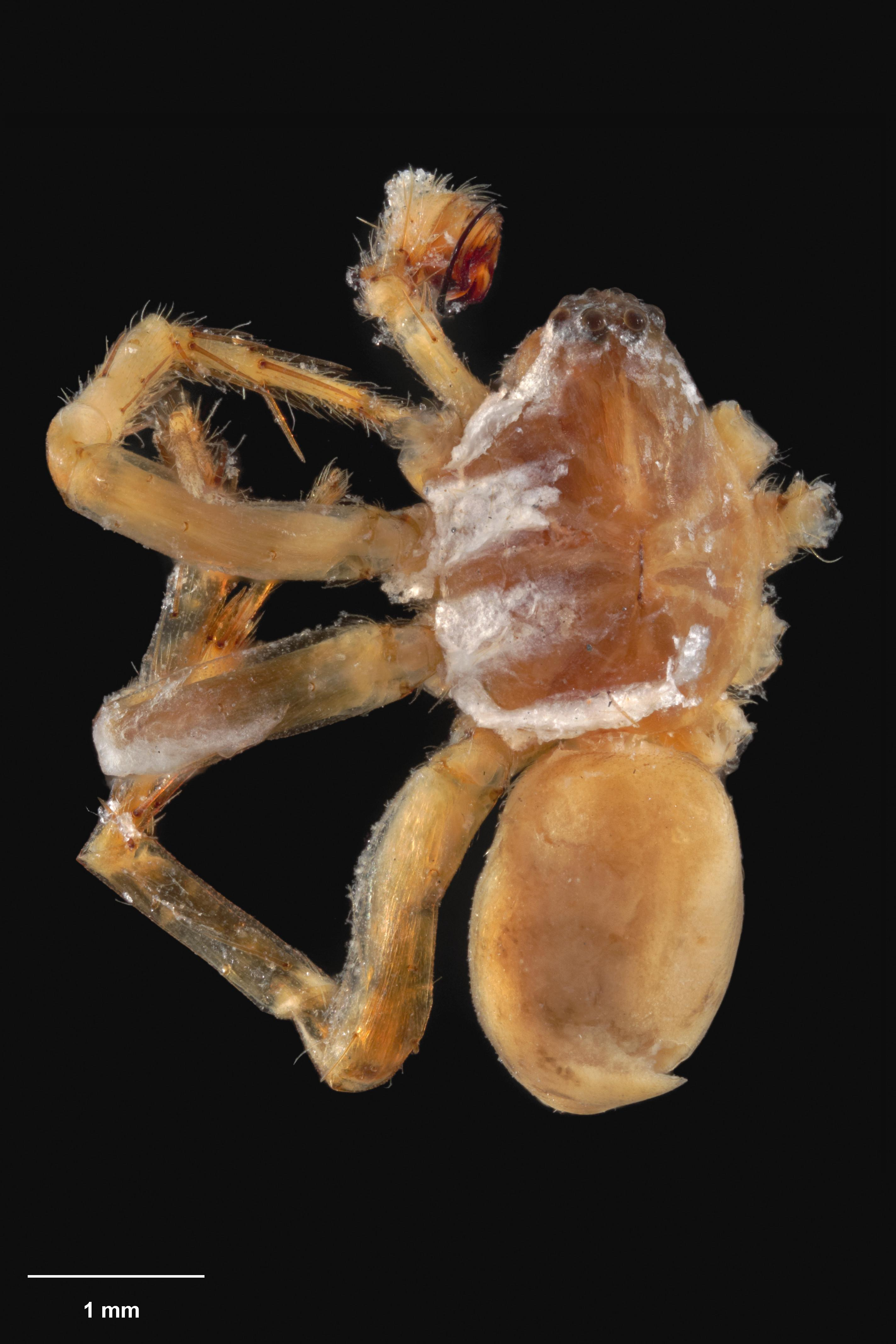

Conservation status
- Data Deficit (NZ TCS)

Scientific classification
- Kingdom: Animalia
- Phylum: Arthropoda
- Subphylum: Chelicerata
- Class: Arachnida
- Order: Araneae
- Infraorder: Araneomorphae
- Family: Desidae
- Genus: Neororea
- Species: N. homerica

Binomial name
- Neororea homerica Forster & Wilton, 1973

= Neororea homerica =

Species of spider

Neororea homerica is a species of spider in the family Desidae that is endemic to New Zealand.

== Taxonomy ==
This species was described by Ray Forster and Cecil Wilton in 1973 from a male specimen. The holotype is stored in Te Papa Museum under registration number AS.000048.

== Description ==
The male is recorded at 4.79mm in length. The carapace is coloured reddish brown. The legs are pale reddish brown. The abdomen is creamy and has dark patches dorsally.

== Distribution ==
This species is only known from Fiordland, New Zealand.

== Conservation status ==
Under the New Zealand Threat Classification System, this species is listed as "Data Deficient" with the qualifiers of "Data Poor: Size", "Data Poor: Trend" and "One Location".
