= Forsterina =

Scientific classification
- Kingdom: Animalia
- Phylum: Arthropoda
- Subphylum: Chelicerata
- Class: Arachnida
- Order: Araneae
- Infraorder: Araneomorphae
- Family: Desidae
- Genus: Forsterina; Lehtinen, 1967

Type species
- F. cryphoeciformis (Simon, 1908)

Species
- 9, see text

Genus of spiders

Forsterina is a genus of South Pacific intertidal spiders that was first described by Pekka T. Lehtinen in 1967.

== Species ==
As of May 2019 it contains nine species:

- Forsterina alticola (Berland, 1924) – New Caledonia
- Forsterina annulipes (L. Koch, 1872) – Australia (Queensland, New South Wales, Lord Howe Is.)
- Forsterina armigera (Simon, 1908) – Australia (Western Australia)
- Forsterina cryphoeciformis (Simon, 1908) (type) – Australia (Western Australia)
- Forsterina koghiana Gray, 1992 – New Caledonia
- Forsterina segestrina (L. Koch, 1872) – Australia (New South Wales)
- Forsterina velifera (Simon, 1908) – Australia (Western Australia)
- Forsterina virgosa (Simon, 1908) – Australia (Western Australia)
- Forsterina vultuosa (Simon, 1908) – Australia (Western Australia)
