= Mamoea bicolor =

Conservation status
- Not Threatened (NZ TCS)

Scientific classification
- Domain: Eukaryota
- Kingdom: Animalia
- Phylum: Arthropoda
- Subphylum: Chelicerata
- Class: Arachnida
- Order: Araneae
- Infraorder: Araneomorphae
- Family: Desidae
- Genus: Mamoea
- Species: M. bicolor

Binomial name
- Mamoea bicolor (Bryant, 1935)

Synonyms
- Rubrius bicolor

Species of spider

Mamoea bicolor is a species of Desidae that is endemic to New Zealand.

== Taxonomy ==
This species was described as Rubrius bicolor by Elizabeth Bryant in 1935 from a female specimen. It was revised in 1973. The holotype is stored in Canterbury Museum.

== Description ==
The female is recorded at 7.99mm in length. The carapace is coloured orange brown. The legs are orange brown. The abdomen has pale markings dorsally and dark markings ventrally.

== Distribution ==
This species is only known from Southland and Fiordland, New Zealand.

== Conservation status ==
Under the New Zealand Threat Classification System, this species is listed as "Not Threatened".
