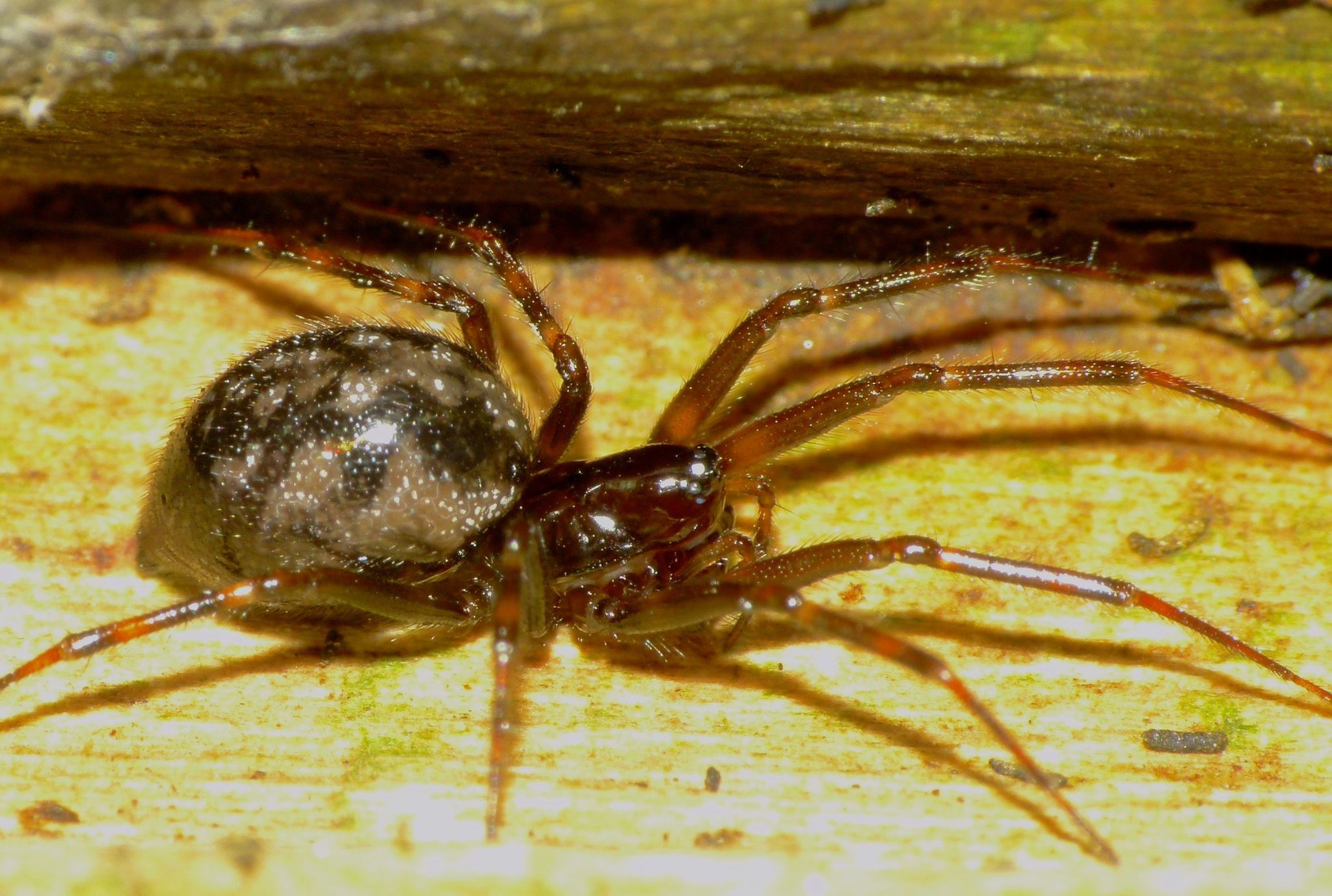
- Pseudafroneta species found in Dunedin, New Zealand

Scientific classification
- Kingdom: Animalia
- Phylum: Arthropoda
- Subphylum: Chelicerata
- Class: Arachnida
- Order: Araneae
- Infraorder: Araneomorphae
- Family: Linyphiidae
- Genus: Pseudafroneta; Blest, 1979

Type species
- P. incerta (Bryant, 1935)

Species
- 7, see text

= Pseudafroneta =

Genus of spiders

Pseudafroneta is a genus of Polynesian sheet weavers that was first described by A. D. Blest in 1979. All currently recognised species in the genus are endemic to New Zealand.

== Species ==
As of May 2019 it contains seven species:

- Pseudafroneta frigida Blest, 1979 – New Zealand
- Pseudafroneta incerta (Bryant, 1935) (type) – New Zealand
- Pseudafroneta lineata Blest, 1979 – New Zealand
- Pseudafroneta maxima Blest, 1979 – New Zealand
- Pseudafroneta pallida Blest, 1979 – New Zealand
- Pseudafroneta perplexa Blest, 1979 – New Zealand
- Pseudafroneta prominula Blest, 1979 – New Zealand
