= Pseudafroneta incerta =

Conservation status
- Not Threatened (NZ TCS)

Scientific classification
- Domain: Eukaryota
- Kingdom: Animalia
- Phylum: Arthropoda
- Subphylum: Chelicerata
- Class: Arachnida
- Order: Araneae
- Infraorder: Araneomorphae
- Family: Linyphiidae
- Genus: Pseudafroneta
- Species: P. incerta

Binomial name
- Pseudafroneta incerta (Bryant, 1935)

Synonyms
- Mynoglenes incerta

Species of spider

Pseudafroneta incerta is a species of sheet weaver spider endemic to New Zealand.

== Taxonomy ==
This species was described as Mynoglenes incerta in 1935 by Elizabeth Bryant from female specimens. In 1979, it was moved to the Pseudafroneta genus, of which it is the type species. The holotype is stored in Canterbury Museum.

== Description ==
The male is recorded at 3.41mm in length whereas the female is 5.5mm. This species has a brown cephalothorax and brown legs which have dark markings. The abdomen has pale markings.

== Distribution ==
This species is only known from the South Island of New Zealand.

== Conservation status ==
Under the New Zealand Threat Classification System, this species is listed as "Not Threatened".
