= Mamoea pilosa =

Conservation status
- Naturally Uncommon (NZ TCS)

Scientific classification
- Domain: Eukaryota
- Kingdom: Animalia
- Phylum: Arthropoda
- Subphylum: Chelicerata
- Class: Arachnida
- Order: Araneae
- Infraorder: Araneomorphae
- Family: Desidae
- Genus: Mamoea
- Species: M. pilosa

Binomial name
- Mamoea pilosa (Bryant, 1935)

Synonyms
- Cambridgea pilosa

Species of spider

Mamoea pilosa is a species of Desidae that is endemic to New Zealand.

== Taxonomy ==
This species was described as Cambridgea pilosa by Elizabeth Bryant in 1935 from a female specimen. It was most recently revised in 1973. The holotype is stored in Canterbury Museum.

== Description ==
The female is recorded at 11.02mm in length whereas the male is 10.50mm. The carapace is coloured orange brown and reddish brown anteriorly. The legs are yellow brown. The abdomen has a pale chevron pattern dorsally.

== Distribution ==
This species is only known from Banks Peninsula, New Zealand.

== Conservation status ==
Under the New Zealand Threat Classification System, this species is listed as "Naturally Uncommon" with the qualifiers of "Data Poor", "Range Restricted" and "Sparse".
