= Tabuna =

Tabuna refers to:

- Dominic Tabuna (b. 1980), Nauruan politician
- Grammonota tabuna, a species of spider
- Tabuna, a cultivar of Karuka
