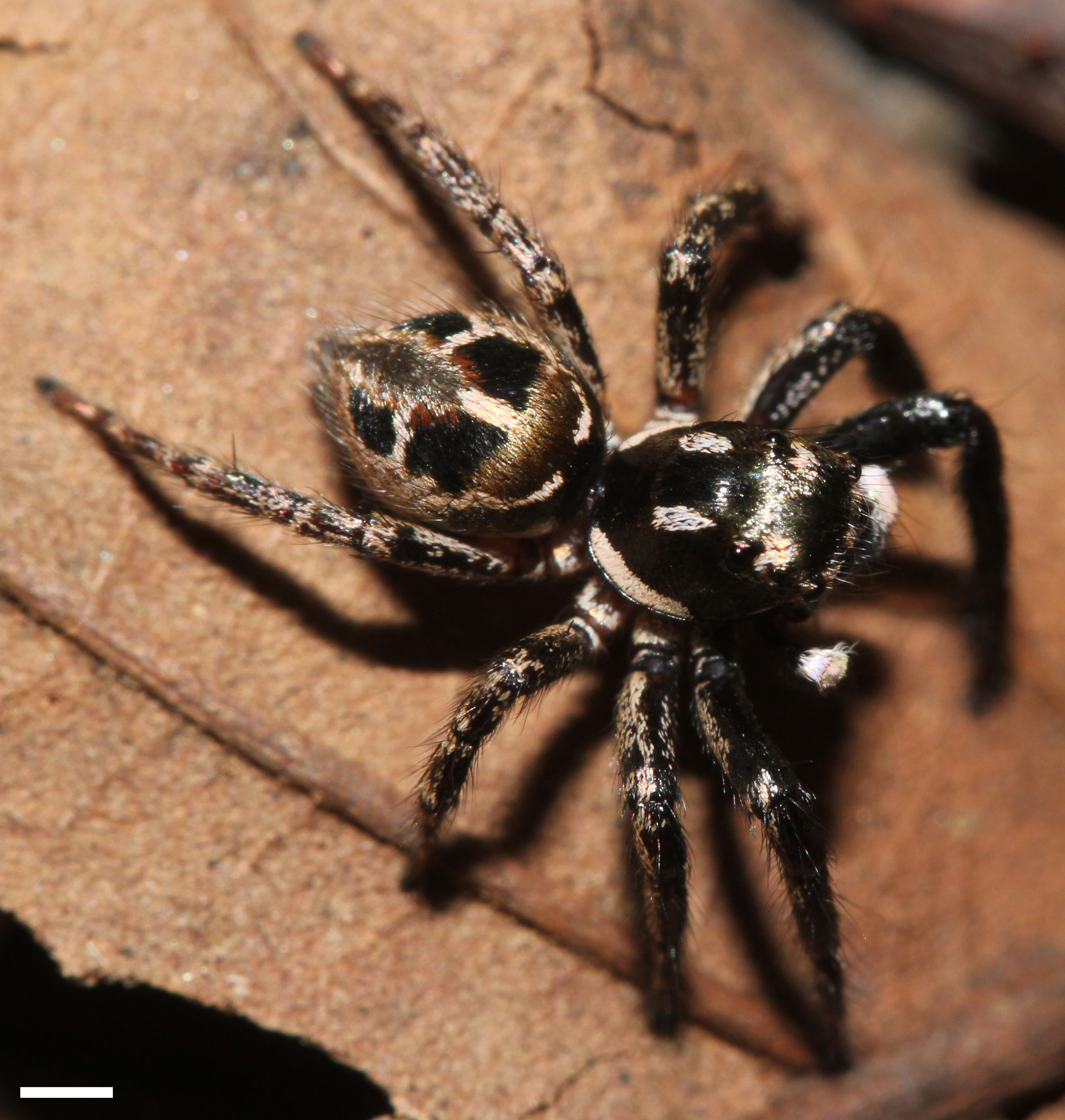
- Male Anasaitis canosus
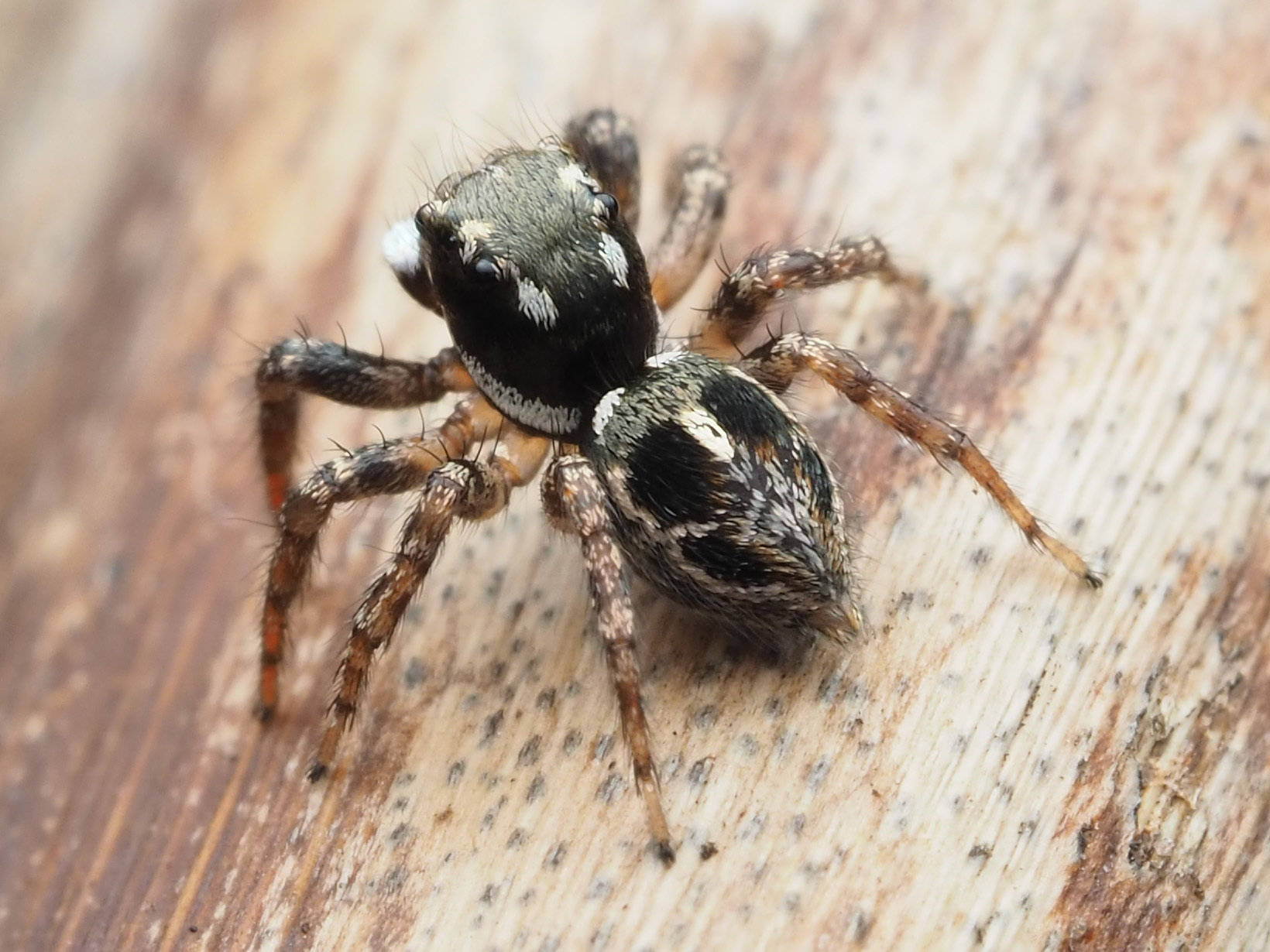
- Female Anasaitis canosus

Scientific classification
- Kingdom: Animalia
- Phylum: Arthropoda
- Subphylum: Chelicerata
- Class: Arachnida
- Order: Araneae
- Infraorder: Araneomorphae
- Family: Salticidae
- Genus: Anasaitis
- Species: A. canosus

Binomial name
- Anasaitis canosus (Walckenaer, 1837)

Synonyms
- Synonymy: Attus canosus Walckenaer, 1837; Attus magus Walckenaer, 1837; Attus auratus Hentz, 1846; Menemerus cruciferus Keyserling, 1885; Prostheclina cambridgii Peckham & Peckham, 1888; Prostheclina aurata Banks, 1893; Pellenes auratus Simon, 1901; Stoides auratus Peckham & Peckham, 1909; Corythalia aurata Bryant, 1940; Stoidis canosa Chamberlin & Ivie, 1944; Stoidis aurita Prószyński, 1976; Corythalia canosa Richman, 1978; Anasaitis canosa Edwards, 1999

= Anasaitis canosus =

Species of spider

Anasaitis canosus, previously of the genus Corythalia, is a small jumping spider that can typically be found atop leaf-litter or man-made structures such as fences and exterior walls. This species is more commonly known as the twin-flagged jumping spider due to the two pennant shaped markings on the dorsal side of the cephalothorax. Typical of the genus Anasaitis, this species has iridescent setae ("scales") which may appear white, green or pink which create the "flags" as well as patches on the male pedipalps used in courtship and intraspecific signaling. This species is roughly 5 to 6 mm in length. A. canosus ranges from Mexico to South Carolina along the Gulf of Mexico.

== History ==
The species was first described by Charles Walckenaer in Histoire naturelle des insectes (1837). It was described based on an illustration by John Abbot that appeared in his unpublished book, Drawings of the Insects of Georgia, in America (1792). There is no type specimen.

== Hunting behavior ==
This species exhibits an instinctive and unique hunting method for catching ants. The spider will align its abdomen and thorax so that it directly faces the ant, and then strafe in an arc until the ant is directly facing the spider. Once aligned, the spider will leap and puncture the ant on the dorsal side of the head or thorax. In this position, the dangerous mandibles are incapable of inflicting damage. When stalking prey such as flies or beetles, this salticid is much more direct in its approach and will pounce and puncture from any direction, presumably because these prey pose less risk to the spider. As is common with jumping spiders, this species uses its silk as a tether whenever leaping. In the event of a miss, they will climb up this silk line back to the previous perch.

== Sexual dimorphism ==
Males typically have a smaller abdomen, darker anterior appendages and the embolus is spade shaped and bent basally. Males use their dark anterior appendages to signal females during elaborate courtship displays. Females are generally larger with relatively larger abdomens, more uniform coloration among the legs and pedipalps are blunt ended.

== Reproduction ==
Females lay eggs inside a silk hide or nest and will guard them until they hatch. Clutch size is around fifteen spiderlings per reproductive event. Males use their anterior most pair of legs in a mating display. Initially they will hold these darkened appendages laterally while maneuvering to face the female directly. When the male is within reach, he use these legs to touch the female on her dorsal side.
