= Mamoea mandibularis =

Conservation status
- Data Deficient (NZ TCS)

Scientific classification
- Domain: Eukaryota
- Kingdom: Animalia
- Phylum: Arthropoda
- Subphylum: Chelicerata
- Class: Arachnida
- Order: Araneae
- Infraorder: Araneomorphae
- Family: Desidae
- Genus: Mamoea
- Species: M. mandibularis

Binomial name
- Mamoea mandibularis (Bryant, 1935)

Synonyms
- Rubrius mandibularis; Corasoides mandibularis

Species of spider

Mamoea mandibularis is a species of Desidae that is endemic to New Zealand.

== Taxonomy ==
This species was described as Rubrius mandibularis by Elizabeth Bryant in 1935 from female specimens. It was most recently revised in 1973. The holotype is stored in Canterbury Museum.

== Description ==
The female is recorded at 7.99mm in length. The carapace and legs are coloured yellow brown. The abdomen has a pale chevron pattern dorsally.

== Distribution ==
This species is only known from Wellington, New Zealand.

== Conservation status ==
Under the New Zealand Threat Classification System, this species is listed as "Data Deficient" with the qualifiers of "Data Poor: Size" and "Data Poor: Trend".
