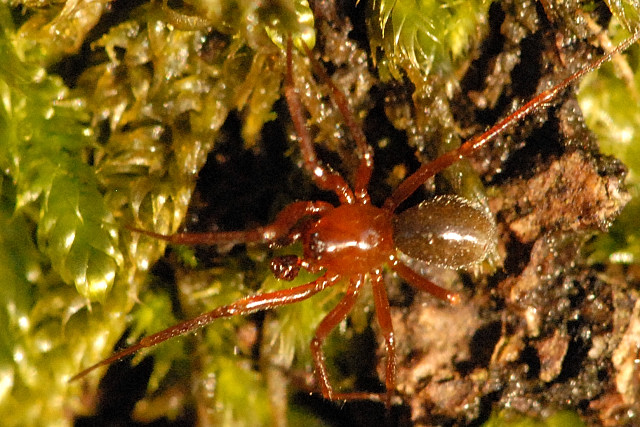
- G. rubens

Scientific classification
- Kingdom: Animalia
- Phylum: Arthropoda
- Subphylum: Chelicerata
- Class: Arachnida
- Order: Araneae
- Infraorder: Araneomorphae
- Family: Linyphiidae
- Genus: Gonatium; Menge, 1868

Type species
- G. rubens (Blackwall, 1833)

Species
- 20, see text

= Gonatium =

Genus of spiders

Gonatium is a genus of dwarf spiders that was first described by Anton Menge in 1868.

== Species ==
As of June 2025 it contains twenty species, found in Algeria, Bulgaria, Canada, China, France, Israel, Italy, Japan, Kazakhstan, Kenya, Korea, Macedonia, Morocco, Portugal, Romania, Russia, Spain, Turkey, and the United States:

- Gonatium arimaense Oi, 1960 – Korea, Japan
- Gonatium biimpressum Simon, 1884 – France (Corsica), Italy
- Gonatium cappadocium Millidge, 1981 – Turkey
- Gonatium crassipalpum Bryant, 1933 – USA, Canada
- Gonatium dayense Simon, 1884 – Algeria
- Gonatium ensipotens (Simon, 1881) – Portugal, Spain, France, Italy
- Gonatium geniculosum Simon, 1918 – France
- Gonatium hilare (Thorell, 1875) – Central and southern Europe, Azerbaijan?
- Gonatium japonicum Simon, 1906 – Russia (Far East), China, Korea, Japan
- Gonatium nemorivagum (O. Pickard-Cambridge, 1875) – Southern Europe
- Gonatium nipponicum Millidge, 1981 – Russia (Far East), Japan
- Gonatium occidentale Simon, 1918 – Spain, France, Morocco, Algeria, Israel
- Gonatium orientale Fage, 1931 – Romania, Bulgaria
- Gonatium pacificum Eskov, 1989 – Russia (Middle Siberia to Far East)
- Gonatium paradoxum (L. Koch, 1869) – Europe
- Gonatium petrunkewitschi Caporiacco, 1949 – Kenya
- Gonatium rubellum (Blackwall, 1841) – Europe, Russia (Europe to Far East)
- Gonatium rubens (Blackwall, 1833) (type) – Europe, Caucasus, Russia (Europe to Far East), Kazakhstan, Central Asia, Japan
- Gonatium strugaense Drensky, 1929 – Macedonia
- Gonatium tridentatum Irfan, Zhang, Cai & Zhang, 2025 – China (Chongqing)
