= Lomaita =

Scientific classification
- Kingdom: Animalia
- Phylum: Arthropoda
- Subphylum: Chelicerata
- Class: Arachnida
- Order: Araneae
- Infraorder: Araneomorphae
- Family: Linyphiidae
- Genus: Lomaita; Bryant, 1948
- Species: L. darlingtoni

Binomial name
- Lomaita darlingtoni Bryant, 1948

Genus of spiders

Lomaita is a monotypic genus of Caribbean dwarf spiders containing the single species, Lomaita darlingtoni. It was first described by E. B. Bryant in 1948, and has only been found in Dominican Republic.
