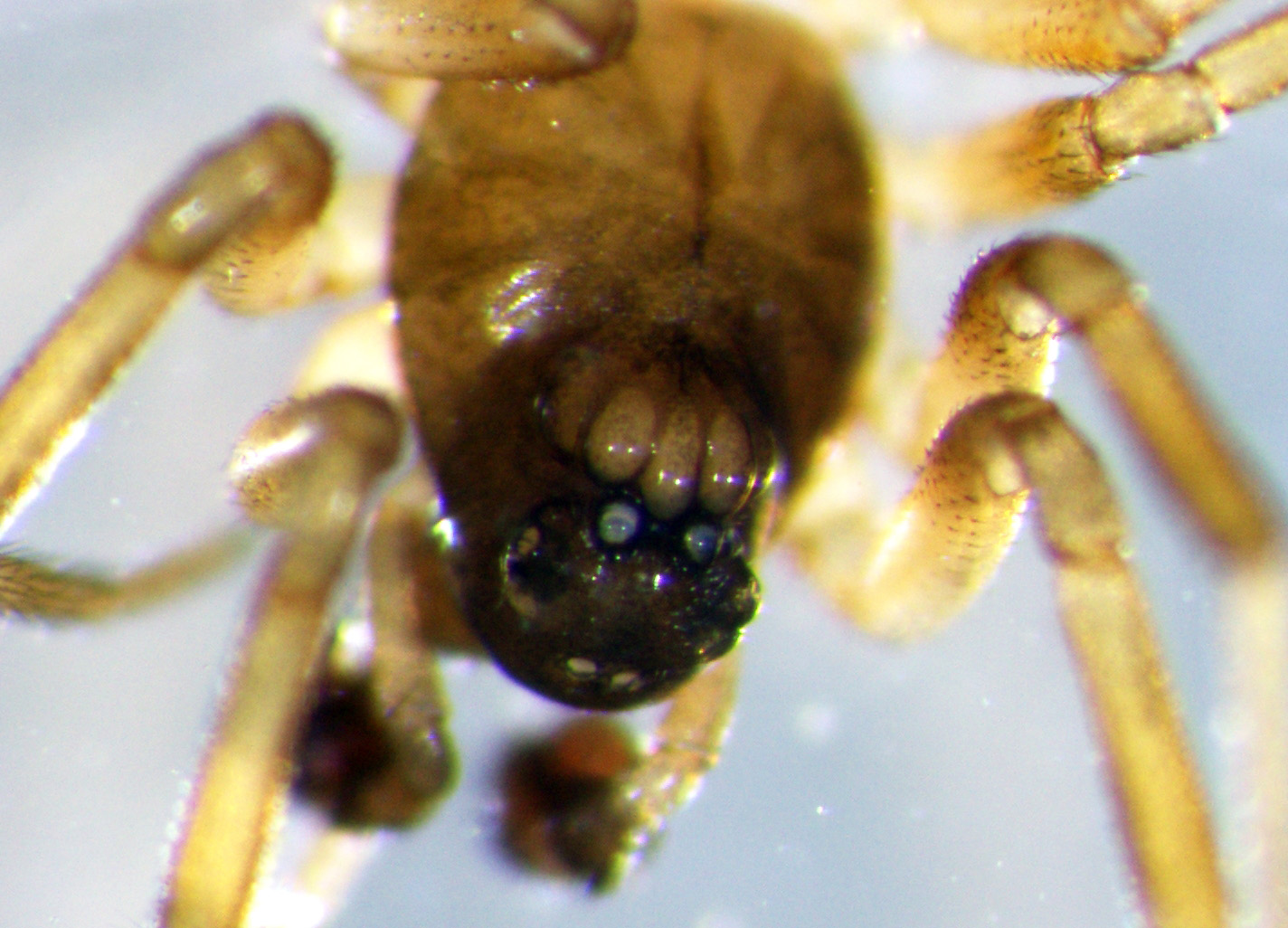
- G. gigas, male

Scientific classification
- Kingdom: Animalia
- Phylum: Arthropoda
- Subphylum: Chelicerata
- Class: Arachnida
- Order: Araneae
- Infraorder: Araneomorphae
- Family: Linyphiidae
- Genus: Grammonota; Emerton, 1882

Type species
- G. pictilis (O. Pickard-Cambridge, 1875)

Species
- 40, see text

Synonyms
- Itytis Strand, 1932

= Grammonota =

Genus of spiders

Grammonota is a genus of dwarf spiders that was first described by James Henry Emerton in 1882.

== Species ==
As of May 2019 it contains forty species and one subspecies, found in Canada, Colombia, Costa Rica, Cuba, Guatemala, Jamaica, Mexico, Panama, and the United States:

- Grammonota angusta Dondale, 1959 – USA, Canada
- Grammonota barnesi Dondale, 1959 – USA
- Grammonota calcarata Bryant, 1948 – Hispaniola
- Grammonota capitata Emerton, 1924 – USA
- Grammonota chamberlini Ivie & Barrows, 1935 – USA
- Grammonota coloradensis Dondale, 1959 – USA
- Grammonota culebra Müller & Heimer, 1991 – Colombia
- Grammonota dalunda Chickering, 1970 – Panama
- Grammonota dubia (O. Pickard-Cambridge, 1898) – Guatemala
- Grammonota electa Bishop & Crosby, 1933 – Costa Rica
- Grammonota emertoni Bryant, 1940 – Cuba
- Grammonota gentilis Banks, 1898 – North America
- Grammonota gigas (Banks, 1896) – USA
- Grammonota innota Chickering, 1970 – Panama
- Grammonota inornata Emerton, 1882 – USA, Canada
- Grammonota insana (Banks, 1898) – Mexico
- Grammonota inusiata Bishop & Crosby, 1933 – USA
- Grammonota jamaicensis Dondale, 1959 – Jamaica
- Grammonota kincaidi (Banks, 1906) – USA
- Grammonota lutacola Chickering, 1970 – Panama
- Grammonota maculata Banks, 1896 – USA, Costa Rica
- Grammonota maritima Emerton, 1925 – Canada
- Grammonota nigriceps Banks, 1898 – Mexico
- Grammonota nigrifrons Gertsch & Mulaik, 1936 – USA
- Grammonota ornata (O. Pickard-Cambridge, 1875) – USA, Canada
- Grammonota pallipes Banks, 1895 – USA
- Grammonota pergrata (O. Pickard-Cambridge, 1894) – Guatemala
- Grammonota pictilis (O. Pickard-Cambridge, 1875) (type) – USA, Canada
- Grammonota salicicola Chamberlin, 1949 – USA
- Grammonota samariensis Müller & Heimer, 1991 – Colombia
- Grammonota secata Chickering, 1970 – Panama, Colombia
- Grammonota semipallida Emerton, 1919 – Canada
- Grammonota subarctica Dondale, 1959 – USA (Alaska)
- Grammonota suspiciosa Gertsch & Mulaik, 1936 – USA
- Grammonota tabuna Chickering, 1970 – Costa Rica, Panama
- Grammonota teresta Chickering, 1970 – Mexico, Panama, Colombia
- Grammonota texana (Banks, 1899) – USA
- Grammonota trivittata Banks, 1895 – USA
  - Grammonota t. georgiana Chamberlin & Ivie, 1944 – USA
- Grammonota vittata Barrows, 1919 – USA
- Grammonota zephyra Dondale, 1959 – USA
