= Gonatium tridentatum =

Scientific classification
- Kingdom: Animalia
- Phylum: Arthropoda
- Subphylum: Chelicerata
- Class: Arachnida
- Order: Araneae
- Infraorder: Araneomorphae
- Family: Linyphiidae
- Genus: Gonatium
- Species: G. tridentatum

Binomial name
- Gonatium tridentatum Irfan, Zhang, Cai & Zhang, 2025

Species of spider

Gonatium tridentatum is a species of dwarf spider in the family Linyphiidae, described in 2025 by Muhammad Irfan, Chang-Cheng Zhang, Yu-Jun Cai, and Zhi-Sheng Zhang. It is endemic to Jiangjin District, Chongqing, China.

== Diagnostic characteristics ==
Gonatium tridentatum can be easily recognized by a unique feature in males: a small leg-like structure near their reproductive organ has three distinct tooth-like points, unlike its close relative Gonatium japonicum, which has only one.

Another distinctive trait in males is a long, curved spine shaped like the letter "C", which wraps close to another part of the body called the cymbium, ending slightly beyond it. The cymbium itself is shaped like a hoof with a small bump on the side.

Females of this species are identified by their reproductive structures, which include spiral-shaped internal ducts and round, globular organs (spermathecae) where sperm is stored, unlike the more oval shapes found in similar species.

== Distribution ==
The species is known only from several localities within the Jiangjin District of Chongqing, China, collected at elevations between 1092 and 1226 meters.

== Habitat ==
Gonatium tridentatum inhabits broad-leaved and coniferous forests, where specimens were collected using Malaise traps and leaf litter sifting.
