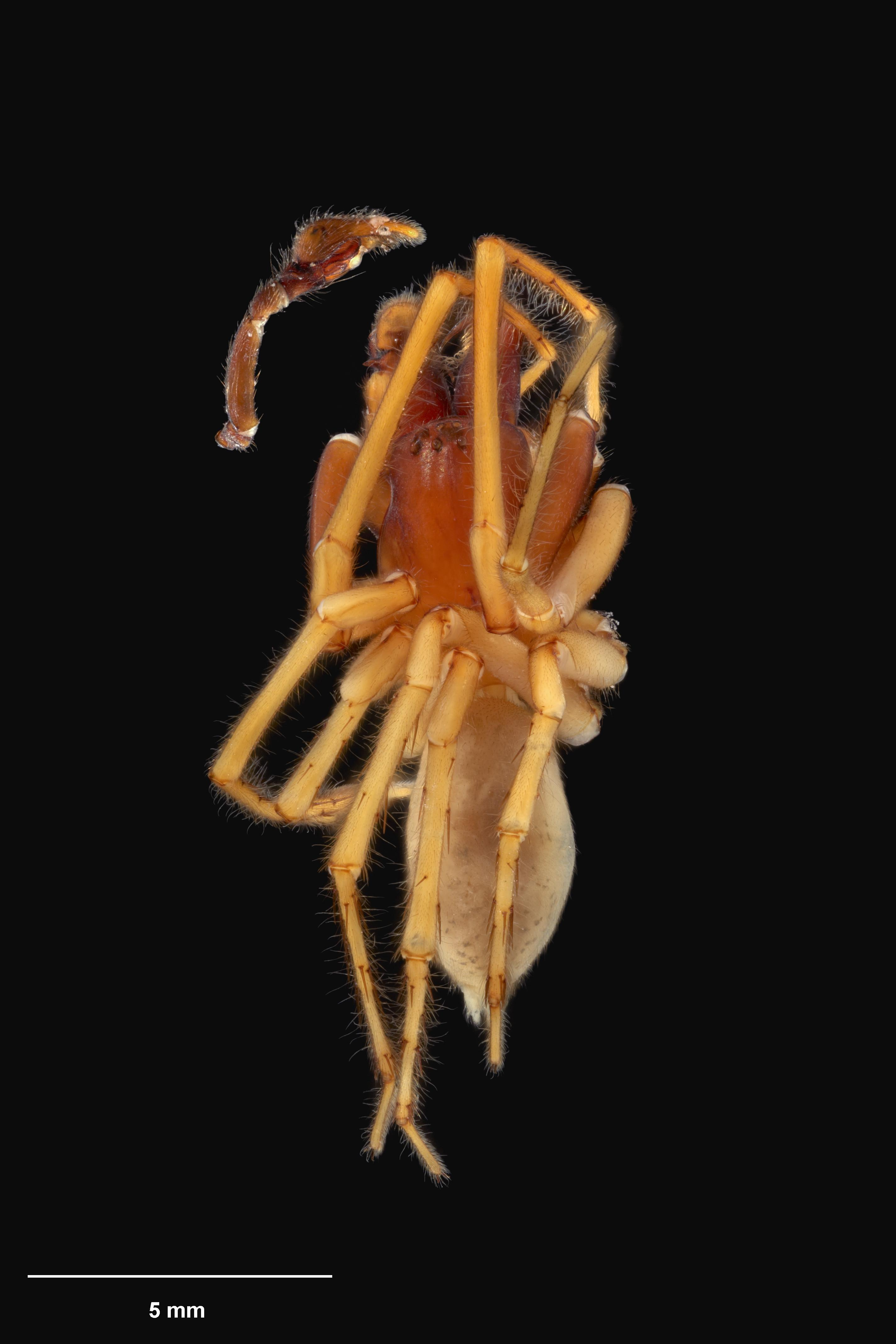

Conservation status
- Not Threatened (NZ TCS)

Scientific classification
- Kingdom: Animalia
- Phylum: Arthropoda
- Subphylum: Chelicerata
- Class: Arachnida
- Order: Araneae
- Infraorder: Araneomorphae
- Family: Desidae
- Genus: Mamoea
- Species: M. florae

Binomial name
- Mamoea florae Forster & Wilton, 1973

= Mamoea florae =

Species of spider

Mamoea florae is a species of Desidae that is endemic to New Zealand.

== Taxonomy ==
This species was described by Ray Forster and Cecil Wilton in 1973 from male and female specimens. The holotype is stored in Te Papa Museum under registration number AS.000027.

== Description ==
The male is recorded at 9.69mm in length whereas the female is 11.90mm. The carapace is coloured dark red brown. The legs are yellow brown. The abdomen has a chevron pattern dorsally.

== Distribution ==
This species is only known from Nelson, New Zealand.

== Conservation status ==
Under the New Zealand Threat Classification System, this species is listed as "Not Threatened".
