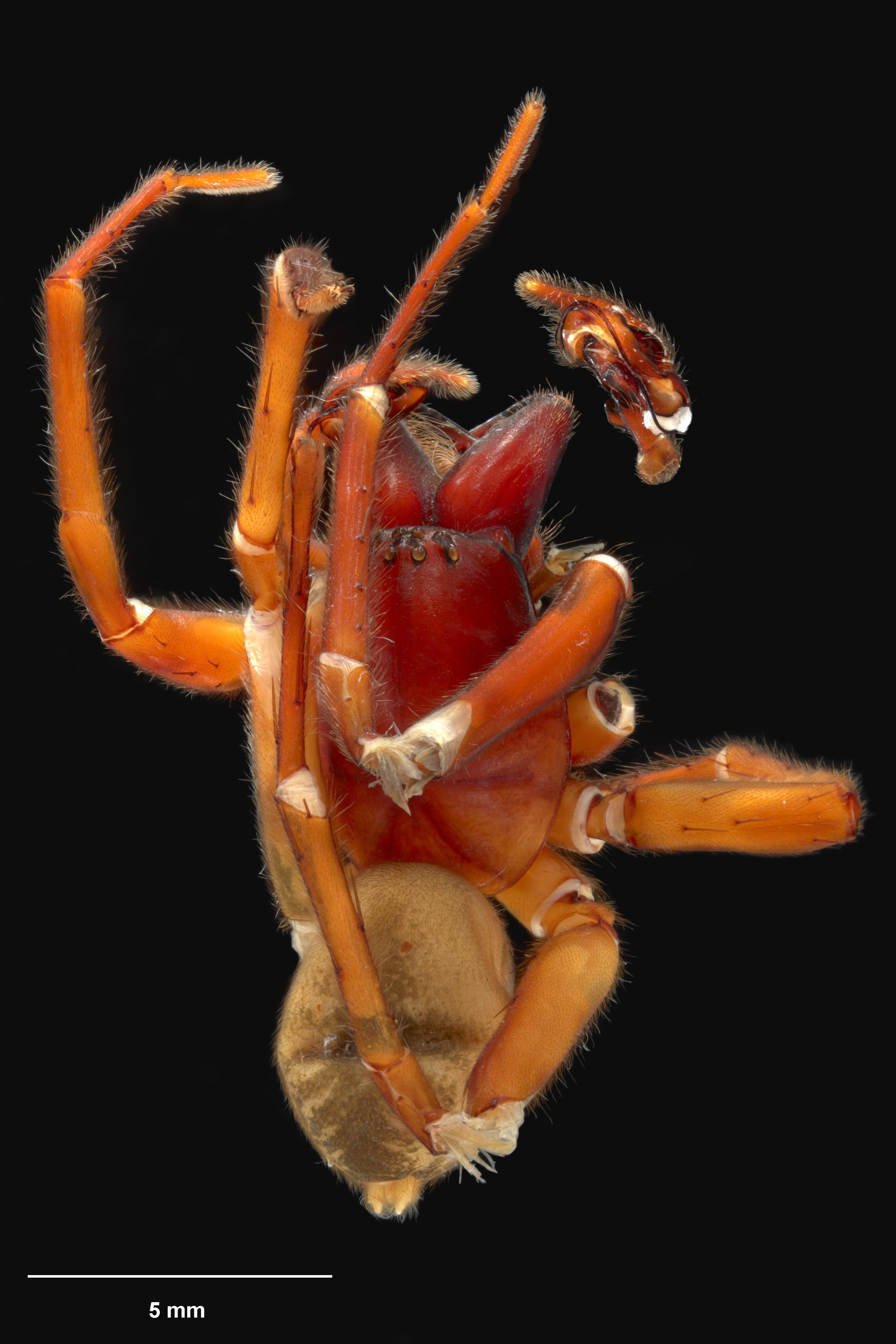

Conservation status
- Not Threatened (NZ TCS)

Scientific classification
- Kingdom: Animalia
- Phylum: Arthropoda
- Subphylum: Chelicerata
- Class: Arachnida
- Order: Araneae
- Infraorder: Araneomorphae
- Family: Desidae
- Genus: Mamoea
- Species: M. grandiosa

Binomial name
- Mamoea grandiosa Forster & Wilton, 1973

= Mamoea grandiosa =

Species of spider

Mamoea grandiosa is a species in the spider family Desidae that is endemic to New Zealand and was first described by Ray Forster and Cecil Wilton in 1973. The holotype specimen was collected by Beverley Holloway at Solomon Island, off Stewart Island, during the 1955 Dominion Museum expedition.

== Taxonomy ==
Mamoea grandiosa is a spider species described by Ray Forster and Cecil Wilton in 1973. It was originally placed in the family Amphinectidae, but a large phylogenetic study by Wheeler et al. transferred the genus Mamoea to Desidae. The type specimen is held at Te Papa.

== Description ==
The carapace and chelicerae of Mamoea grandiosa are bright red brown, while the legs and sternum are orange brown. The abdomen has a broad grey band down the mid-dorsal (upper) surface with seven pairs of lateral branches on posterior (rear) half. The ventral surface of the abdomen is cream with a few scattered brown patches. The body length of both males and females is given as approximately 12 mm.

Forster and Wilton not formally present a diagnosis for M. grandiosa but did note the distinctiveness of the female epigynum. Figures of the male palp are also implicitly diagnostic.

== Distribution ==
The type locality for Mamoea grandiosa is Solomon Island / Rerewhakaupoko, south-west of Stewart Island / Rakiura. The holotype specimen was collected by Beverley Holloway during the 1955 Dominion Museum expedition. It is also known from Stewart Island and the southern South Island of New Zealand.

== Conservation status ==
Mamoea grandiosa has been assessed under the New Zealand Threat Classification System and categorised as Not Threatened (NT).
