= Mamoea monticola =

Conservation status
- Naturally Uncommon (NZ TCS)

Scientific classification
- Kingdom: Animalia
- Phylum: Arthropoda
- Subphylum: Chelicerata
- Class: Arachnida
- Order: Araneae
- Infraorder: Araneomorphae
- Family: Desidae
- Genus: Mamoea
- Species: M. monticola

Binomial name
- Mamoea monticola Forster & Wilton, 1973

Species of spider

Mamoea monticola is a species of Desidae that is endemic to New Zealand.

== Taxonomy ==
This species was described by Ray Forster and Cecil Wilton in 1973 from female and male specimens. The holotype is stored in Te Papa Museum under registration number AS.000071.

== Description ==
The female is recorded at 5.80mm in length whereas the male is 5.55mm. The carapace is coloured reddish brown. The abdomen is brownish with a pale chevron pattern dorsally.

== Distribution ==
This species is only known from Nelson, New Zealand.

== Conservation status ==
Under the New Zealand Threat Classification System, this species is listed as "Naturally Uncommon" with the qualifier of "Range Restricted".
