= Pseudafroneta frigida =

Conservation status
- Naturally Uncommon (NZ TCS)

Scientific classification
- Domain: Eukaryota
- Kingdom: Animalia
- Phylum: Arthropoda
- Subphylum: Chelicerata
- Class: Arachnida
- Order: Araneae
- Infraorder: Araneomorphae
- Family: Linyphiidae
- Genus: Pseudafroneta
- Species: P. frigida

Binomial name
- Pseudafroneta frigida Blest, 1979

Species of spider

Pseudafroneta frigida is a species of sheet weaver spider endemic to New Zealand.

== Taxonomy ==
This species was described in 1979 by A.D Blest from male and female specimens. It was most recently revised in 2002, in which the male was described. The holotype is stored in Otago Museum.

== Description ==
The male is recorded at 5.38mm in length whereas the female is 5.91mm.

== Distribution ==
This species is only known from the Chatham Islands in New Zealand.

== Conservation status ==
Under the New Zealand Threat Classification System, this species is listed as "Naturally Uncommon" with the qualifiers of "Island Endemic" and "Range Restricted".
