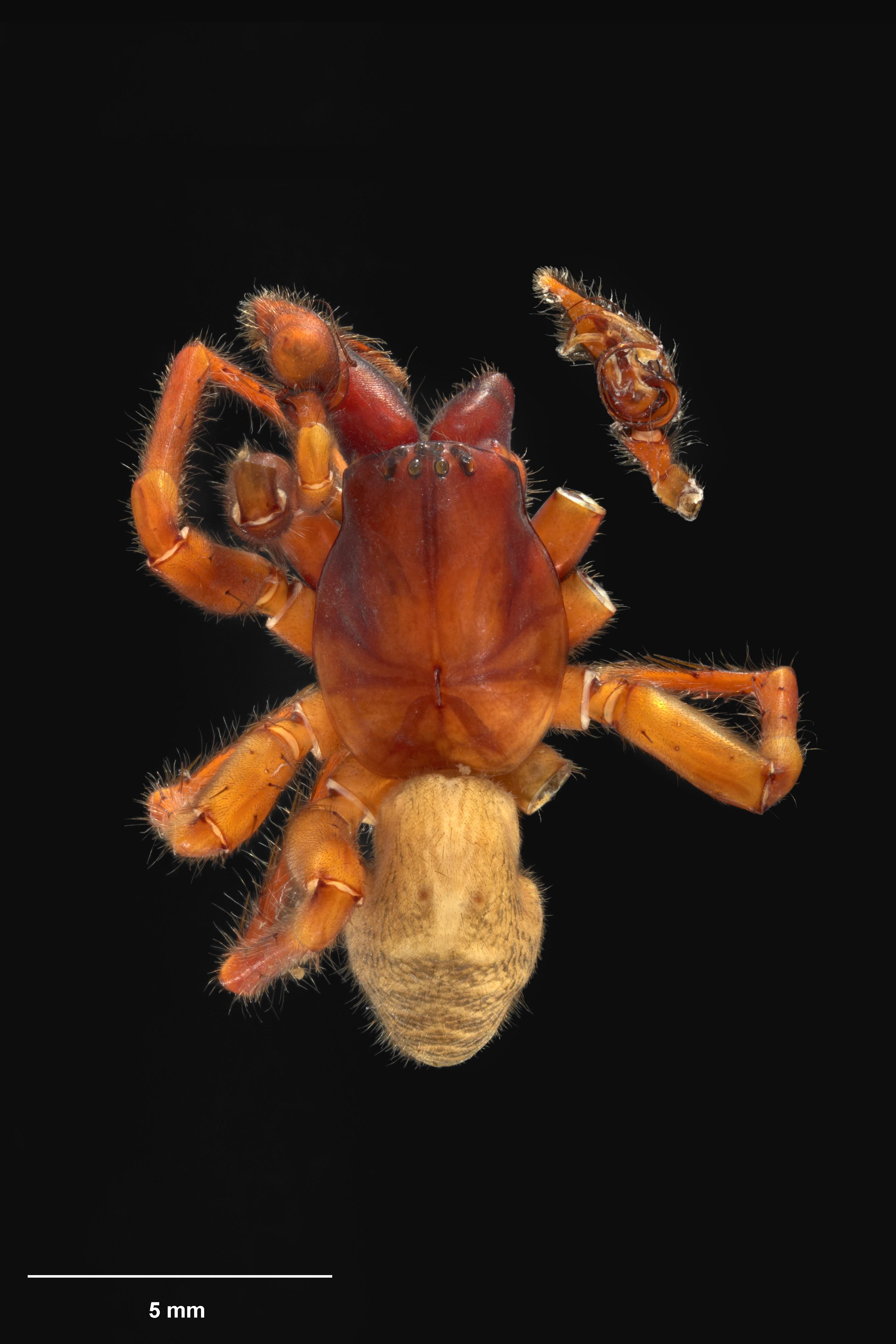

Conservation status
- Not Threatened (NZ TCS)

Scientific classification
- Kingdom: Animalia
- Phylum: Arthropoda
- Subphylum: Chelicerata
- Class: Arachnida
- Order: Araneae
- Infraorder: Araneomorphae
- Family: Desidae
- Genus: Mamoea
- Species: M. rakiura

Binomial name
- Mamoea rakiura Forster & Wilton, 1973

= Mamoea rakiura =

Species of spider

Mamoea rakiura is a species of Desidae that is endemic to New Zealand.

== Taxonomy ==
This species was described by Ray Forster and Cecil Wilton in 1973 from male and female specimens. The holotype is stored in Te Papa Museum under registration number AS.000096.

== Description ==
The male is recorded at 11.05mm in length whereas the female is 12.07mm. The carapace is coloured dark reddish brown. The legs are yellow brown. The abdomen is shaded with black dorsally.

== Distribution ==
This species is only known from Stewart Island and the southern end of New Zealand's South Island.

== Conservation status ==
Under the New Zealand Threat Classification System, this species is listed as "Not Threatened".
