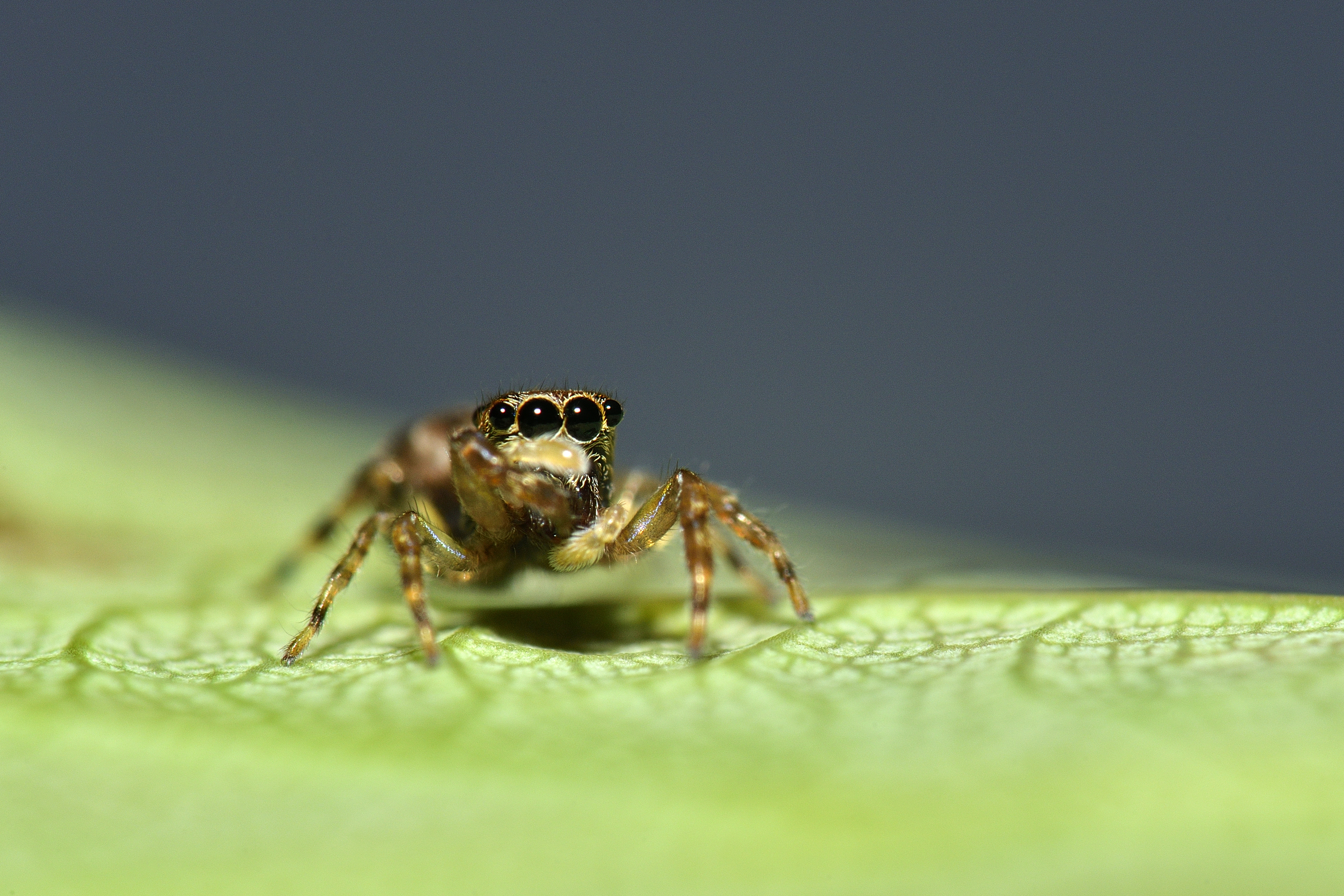

Scientific classification
- Kingdom: Animalia
- Phylum: Arthropoda
- Subphylum: Chelicerata
- Class: Arachnida
- Order: Araneae
- Infraorder: Araneomorphae
- Family: Salticidae
- Genus: Anasaitis
- Species: A. milesae

Binomial name
- Anasaitis milesae Logunov, 2024

= Anasaitis milesae =

Species of spider

Anasaitis milesae is a species of jumping spider (family Salticidae) that was first discovered in 2023 and formally described in 2024. It represents one of around 50 non-native spider species that have become established in Britain, likely facilitated by global warming providing an increasingly hospitable climate.

== History and systematics ==
The species was discovered by students and members of the public during a "bioblitz" on the Penryn campus in Cornwall, England, home to the University of Exeter and Falmouth University. Immature and female spiders were first collected on 29 April 2023, adult males on 17 May 2023. It was confirmed as a new species and named by Russian arachnologist Dmitri Logunov of the Zoological Institute of the Russian Academy of Sciences, who was sent specimens by Cornwall's County Spider Recorder Tylan Berry. The specific name milesae honours Claire Miles (1958–2023), a former honorary curator at the Manchester Museum where the holotype is kept.

Logunov provisionally assigned the species to the genus Anasaitis, based on the diagnostic features of the genitalia of the two sexes. It most resembled three Anasaitis species from the Greater Antilles: A. emertoni, A. peckhami, and A. squamata. However, there were differences from other Anasaitis species, including less differentiation in body colour between males and females.

== Description ==
The spider measures about 3-4 mm in length and has distinctive furry tiger-type brown and cream markings. The holotype male has a carapace about 1.5 mm long by 1.0 mm wide and an abdomen about 1.35 mm long by 0.9 mm wide. The first leg is the longest at about 2.6 mm. The overall base colour of the male is yellowish, with brown markings, including a W-shaped central brown mark on the top of the abdomen accompanied by brown spots, and brown lines and rings on the legs. Its palpal bulb has a relatively long tibial apophysis with a small tooth-like bump at the base. The paratype female is larger, with a carapace about 1.6 mm long by 1.1 mm wide and an abdomen about 1.9 mm long and 1.25 mm wide. The fourth leg is the longest at about 2.9 mm. The female is a similar colour to the male, but paler; the first pair of legs are entirely yellow rather than having partially brown sides.

== Distribution ==
Its nearest known relatives are found in the Caribbean region, suggesting that A. milesae likely arrived in Britain from distant tropical or subtropical regions through international trade and travel.
