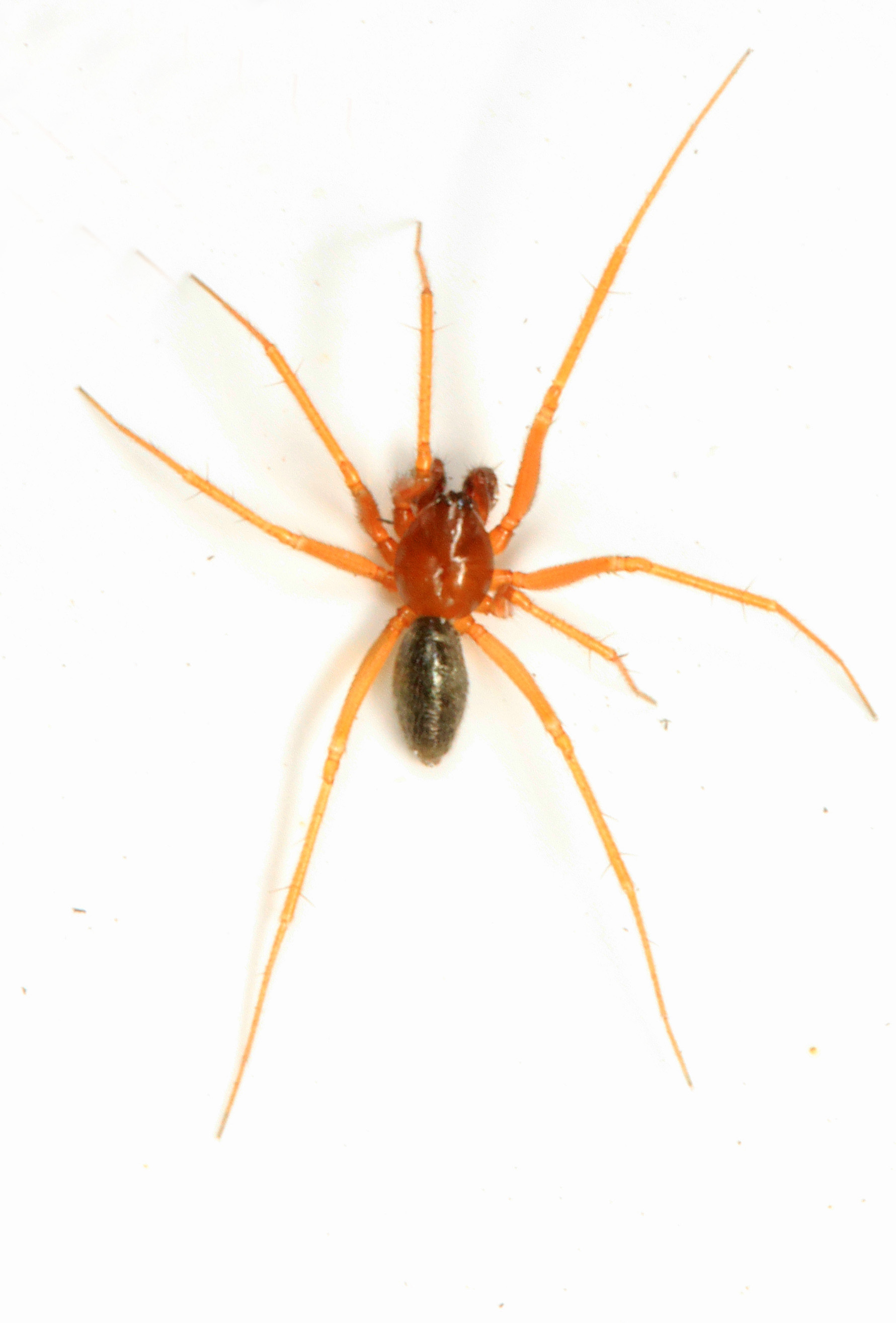

Scientific classification
- Domain: Eukaryota
- Kingdom: Animalia
- Phylum: Arthropoda
- Subphylum: Chelicerata
- Class: Arachnida
- Order: Araneae
- Infraorder: Araneomorphae
- Family: Linyphiidae
- Genus: Gonatium
- Species: G. crassipalpum

Binomial name
- Gonatium crassipalpum Bryant, 1933

= Gonatium crassipalpum =

Species of spider

Gonatium crassipalpum is a species of dwarf spider in the family Linyphiidae. It is found in the United States and Canada.
