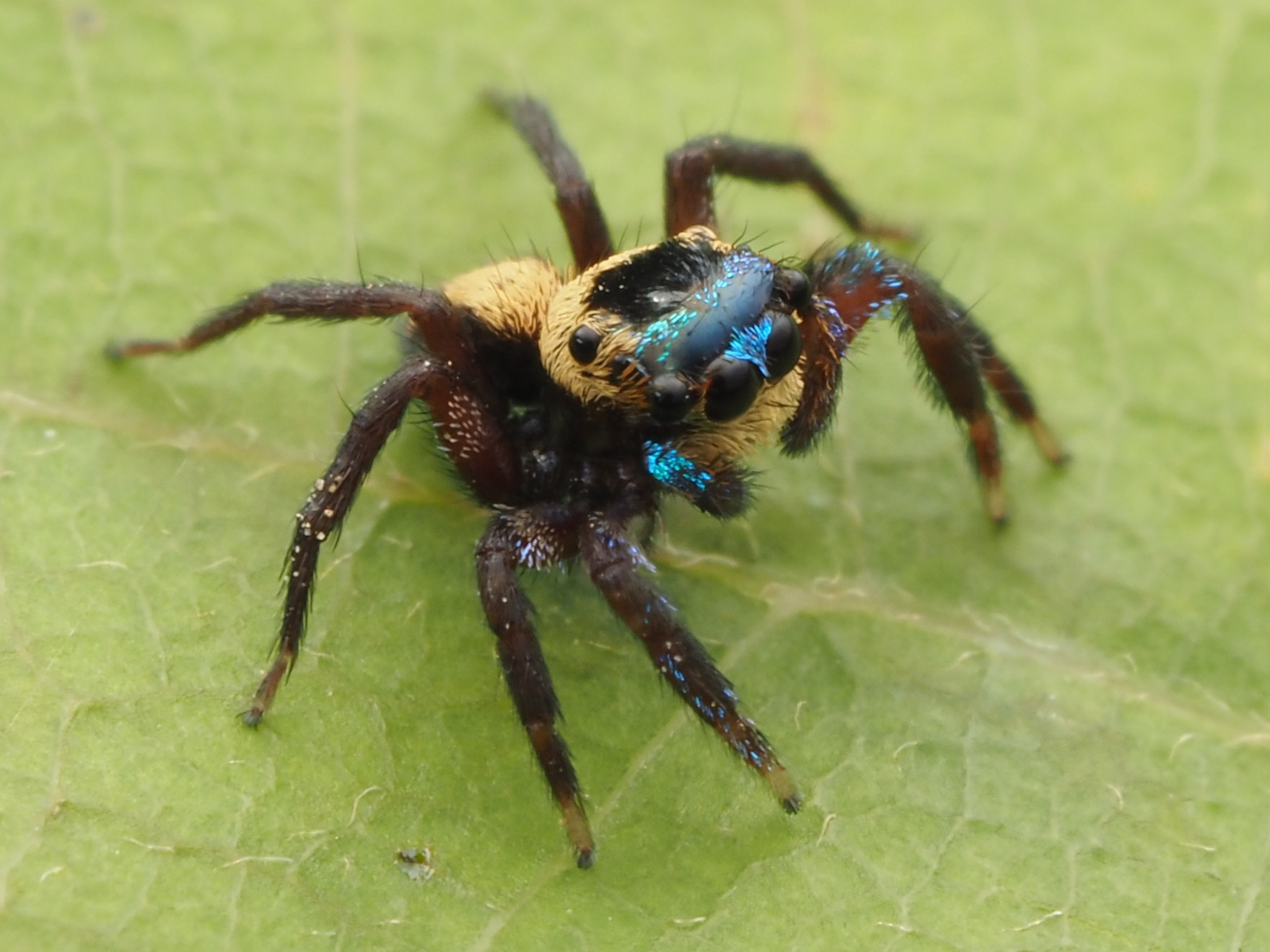
- Male Anasaitis canalis in Panama

Scientific classification
- Kingdom: Animalia
- Phylum: Arthropoda
- Subphylum: Chelicerata
- Class: Arachnida
- Order: Araneae
- Infraorder: Araneomorphae
- Family: Salticidae
- Genus: Anasaitis
- Species: A. canalis

Binomial name
- Anasaitis canalis (Chamberlin, 1925)

= Anasaitis canalis =

Species of spider

Anasaitis canalis is a species of spider from the genus Anasaitis. It was originally described by Ralph Vary Chamberlin in 1925.

== Description ==
Anasaitis canalis was originally named as Saitis canalis. It is a spider of about 4 mm in length. This little spider has a dusky brown behind, with the eye region black with some blue and green reflections. It is also covered with yellowish-gray hair, but the first and second legs have long black hair.

== Distribution ==
Anasaitis canalis was originally described by a specimen found on Barro Colorado Island, an island in the Panama Canal. Recent observation place this species primarily in Central America, although it has also been reported from the Caribbean region of Colombia.
