= Mamoea montana =

Conservation status
- Data Deficit (NZ TCS)

Scientific classification
- Kingdom: Animalia
- Phylum: Arthropoda
- Subphylum: Chelicerata
- Class: Arachnida
- Order: Araneae
- Infraorder: Araneomorphae
- Family: Desidae
- Genus: Mamoea
- Species: M. montana

Binomial name
- Mamoea montana Forster & Wilton, 1973

Species of spider

Mamoea montana is a species of Desidae that is endemic to New Zealand.

== Taxonomy ==
This species was described by Ray Forster and Cecil Wilton in 1973 from a female specimen. The holotype is stored in Otago Museum.

== Description ==
The female is recorded at 9.70mm in length. The carapace is coloured orange brown. The abdomen is brownish grey and has a dark chevron pattern dorsally.

== Distribution ==
This species is only known from Central Otago, New Zealand.

== Conservation status ==
Under the New Zealand Threat Classification System, this species is listed as "Data Deficient" with the qualifiers of "Data Poor: Size", "Data Poor: Trend" and "One Location".
