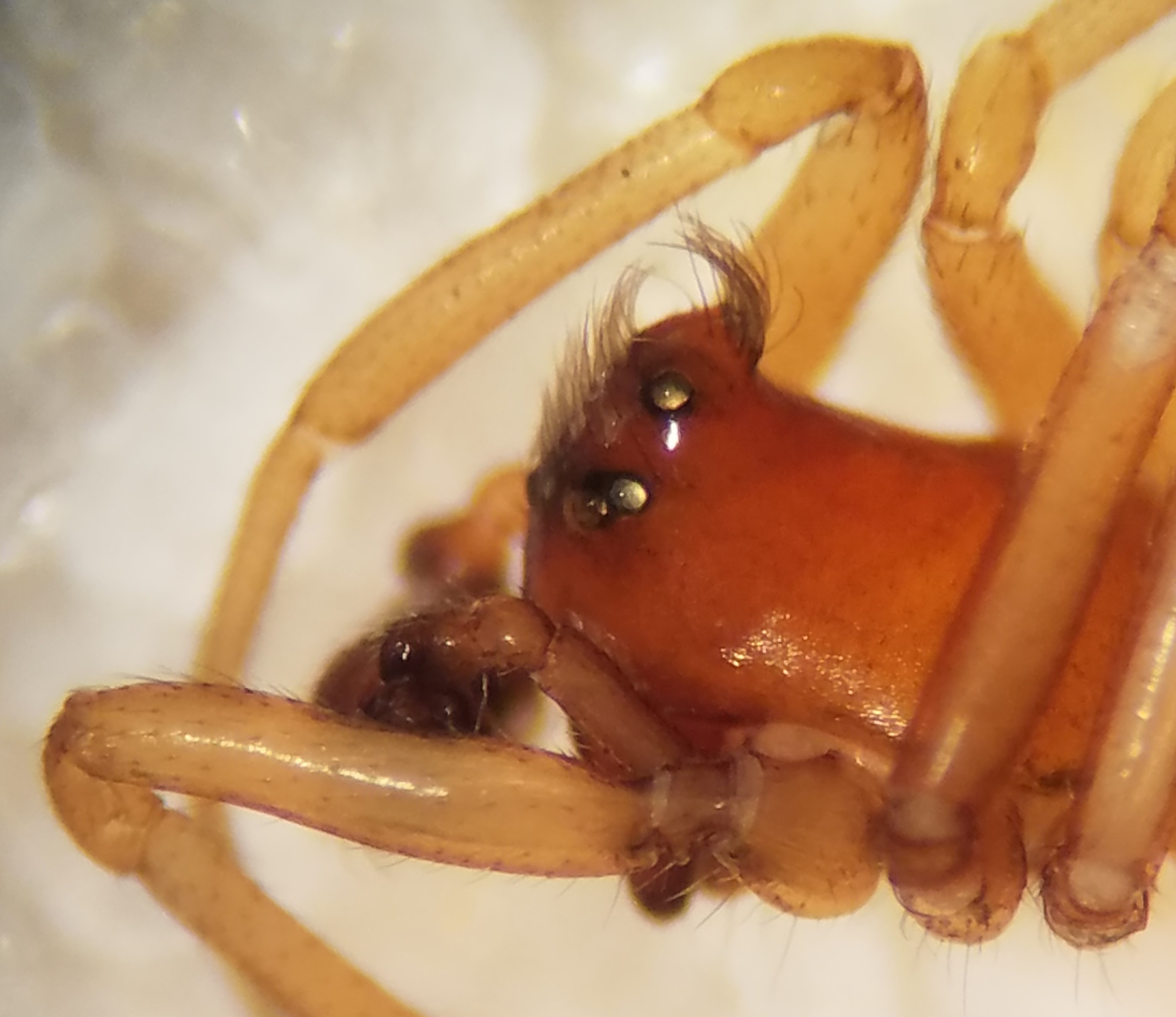

Scientific classification
- Domain: Eukaryota
- Kingdom: Animalia
- Phylum: Arthropoda
- Subphylum: Chelicerata
- Class: Arachnida
- Order: Araneae
- Infraorder: Araneomorphae
- Family: Linyphiidae
- Genus: Grammonota
- Species: G. texana

Binomial name
- Grammonota texana (Banks, 1899)

= Grammonota texana =

Species of spider

Grammonota texana is a species of dwarf spider in the family Linyphiidae. It is found in the United States.
