= Pseudafroneta lineata =

Conservation status
- Not Threatened (NZ TCS)

Scientific classification
- Kingdom: Animalia
- Phylum: Arthropoda
- Subphylum: Chelicerata
- Class: Arachnida
- Order: Araneae
- Infraorder: Araneomorphae
- Family: Linyphiidae
- Genus: Pseudafroneta
- Species: P. lineata

Binomial name
- Pseudafroneta lineata Blest, 1979

Species of spider

Pseudafroneta lineata is a species of sheet weaver spider endemic to New Zealand.

== Taxonomy ==
This species was described in 1979 by A.D Blest from male and female specimens. The holotype is stored in Otago Museum.

== Description ==
The male is recorded at 3.58 millimetres (0.141 in) in length whereas the female is 5mm. The male has a brown cephalothorax and brown legs. The abdomen has pale markings. The abdomen pattern differs in the female.

== Distribution ==
This species is only known from the North Island of New Zealand.

== Conservation status ==
Under the New Zealand Threat Classification System, this species is listed as "Not Threatened".
