= Grammonota capitata =

Scientific classification
- Domain: Eukaryota
- Kingdom: Animalia
- Phylum: Arthropoda
- Subphylum: Chelicerata
- Class: Arachnida
- Order: Araneae
- Infraorder: Araneomorphae
- Family: Linyphiidae
- Genus: Grammonota
- Species: G. capitata

Binomial name
- Grammonota capitata Emerton, 1924

Species of spider

Grammonota capitata is a species of dwarf spider in the family Linyphiidae. It is found in the United States.
