= Allodecta =

Scientific classification
- Kingdom: Animalia
- Phylum: Arthropoda
- Subphylum: Chelicerata
- Class: Arachnida
- Order: Araneae
- Infraorder: Araneomorphae
- Family: Salticidae
- Genus: Allodecta; Bryant, 1950
- Species: A. maxillaris

Binomial name
- Allodecta maxillaris Bryant, 1950

Genus of spiders

Allodecta is a monotypic genus of jumping spiders containing the single species, Allodecta maxillaris. It was first described by Elizabeth B. Bryant in 1950, and is only found on the Greater Antilles.
