= Bryantella =

Scientific classification
- Kingdom: Animalia
- Phylum: Arthropoda
- Subphylum: Chelicerata
- Class: Arachnida
- Order: Araneae
- Infraorder: Araneomorphae
- Family: Salticidae
- Subfamily: Salticinae
- Genus: Bryantella; Chickering, 1946

Type species
- B. speciosa Chickering, 1946

Species
- B. smaragda (Crane, 1945) – Panama to Argentina; B. speciosa Chickering, 1946 – Panama to Brazil

Genus of spiders

Bryantella is a genus of jumping spiders that was first described by Arthur Merton Chickering in 1946. As of June 2019 it contains only two species, found only in Brazil, Argentina, and Panama: B. smaragda and B. speciosa. This genus was named in honour of Elizabeth B. Bryant.
