= Mamoea rufa =

Conservation status
- Not Threatened (NZ TCS)

Scientific classification
- Domain: Eukaryota
- Kingdom: Animalia
- Phylum: Arthropoda
- Subphylum: Chelicerata
- Class: Arachnida
- Order: Araneae
- Infraorder: Araneomorphae
- Family: Desidae
- Genus: Mamoea
- Species: M. rufa

Binomial name
- Mamoea rufa (Berland, 1935)

Synonyms
- Rubrius rufus

Species of spider

Mamoea rufa is a species of Desidae that is endemic to New Zealand.

== Taxonomy ==
The species was described as Rubrius rufus by Lucien Berland in 1935 from a female specimen. It was most recently revised in 1973. The holotype is stored in Canterbury Museum.

== Description ==
The male is recorded at 11.39mm in length whereas the female is 11.73mm.

== Distribution ==
This species is only known from Otago, New Zealand. It was originally recorded from Campbell Island, but this is believed to be an error.

== Conservation status ==
Under the New Zealand Threat Classification System, this species is listed as "Not Threatened".
