= Mamoea westlandica =

Conservation status
- Not Threatened (NZ TCS)

Scientific classification
- Kingdom: Animalia
- Phylum: Arthropoda
- Subphylum: Chelicerata
- Class: Arachnida
- Order: Araneae
- Infraorder: Araneomorphae
- Family: Desidae
- Genus: Mamoea
- Species: M. westlandica

Binomial name
- Mamoea westlandica Forster & Wilton, 1973

Species of spider

Mamoea westlandica is a species of Desidae that is endemic to New Zealand.

== Taxonomy ==
This species was described by Ray Forster and Cecil Wilton in 1973 from male and female specimens. The holotype is stored in Otago Museum.

== Description ==
The male is recorded at 12.75mm in length whereas the female is 12.07mm. The carapace is coloured reddish brown and paler posteriorly. The legs are reddish brown with dark patches. The abdomen has a chevron pattern dorsally.

== Distribution ==
This species is only known from the Westland and Fiordland, New Zealand.

== Conservation status ==
Under the New Zealand Threat Classification System, this species is listed as "Not Threatened".
