= Mamoea assimilis =

Conservation status
- Data Deficit (NZ TCS)

Scientific classification
- Kingdom: Animalia
- Phylum: Arthropoda
- Subphylum: Chelicerata
- Class: Arachnida
- Order: Araneae
- Infraorder: Araneomorphae
- Family: Desidae
- Genus: Mamoea
- Species: M. assimilis

Binomial name
- Mamoea assimilis Forster & Wilton, 1973

Species of spider

Mamoea assimilis is a species of Desidae that is endemic to New Zealand.

== Taxonomy ==
This species was described by Ray Forster and Cecil Wilton in 1973 from male and female specimens. The holotype is stored in Otago Museum.

== Description ==
The male is recorded at 6.60mm in length whereas the female is 6.90mm. The carapace is coloured reddish brown and has dark shading. The abdomen is dark brownish grey and has pale spots dorsally.

== Distribution ==
This species is only known from Nelson, New Zealand.

== Conservation status ==
Under the New Zealand Threat Classification System, this species is listed as "Data Deficient" with the qualifiers of "Data Poor: Size" and "Data Poor: Trend".
