= Mamoea cooki =

Conservation status
- Not Threatened (NZ TCS)

Scientific classification
- Kingdom: Animalia
- Phylum: Arthropoda
- Subphylum: Chelicerata
- Class: Arachnida
- Order: Araneae
- Infraorder: Araneomorphae
- Family: Desidae
- Genus: Mamoea
- Species: M. cooki

Binomial name
- Mamoea cooki Forster & Wilton, 1973

Species of spider

Mamoea cooki is a species of Desidae that is endemic to New Zealand.

== Taxonomy ==
This species was described by Ray Forster and Cecil Wilton in 1973 from female specimens. The holotype is stored in Otago Museum.

== Description ==
The female is recorded at 6.10mm in length. The carapace is coloured reddish brow with some light shading. The abdomen is brown with a faint pale chevron pattern dorsally.

== Distribution ==
This species is only known from Marlborough and Stephens Island, New Zealand.

== Conservation status ==
Under the New Zealand Threat Classification System, this species is listed as "Not Threatened".
