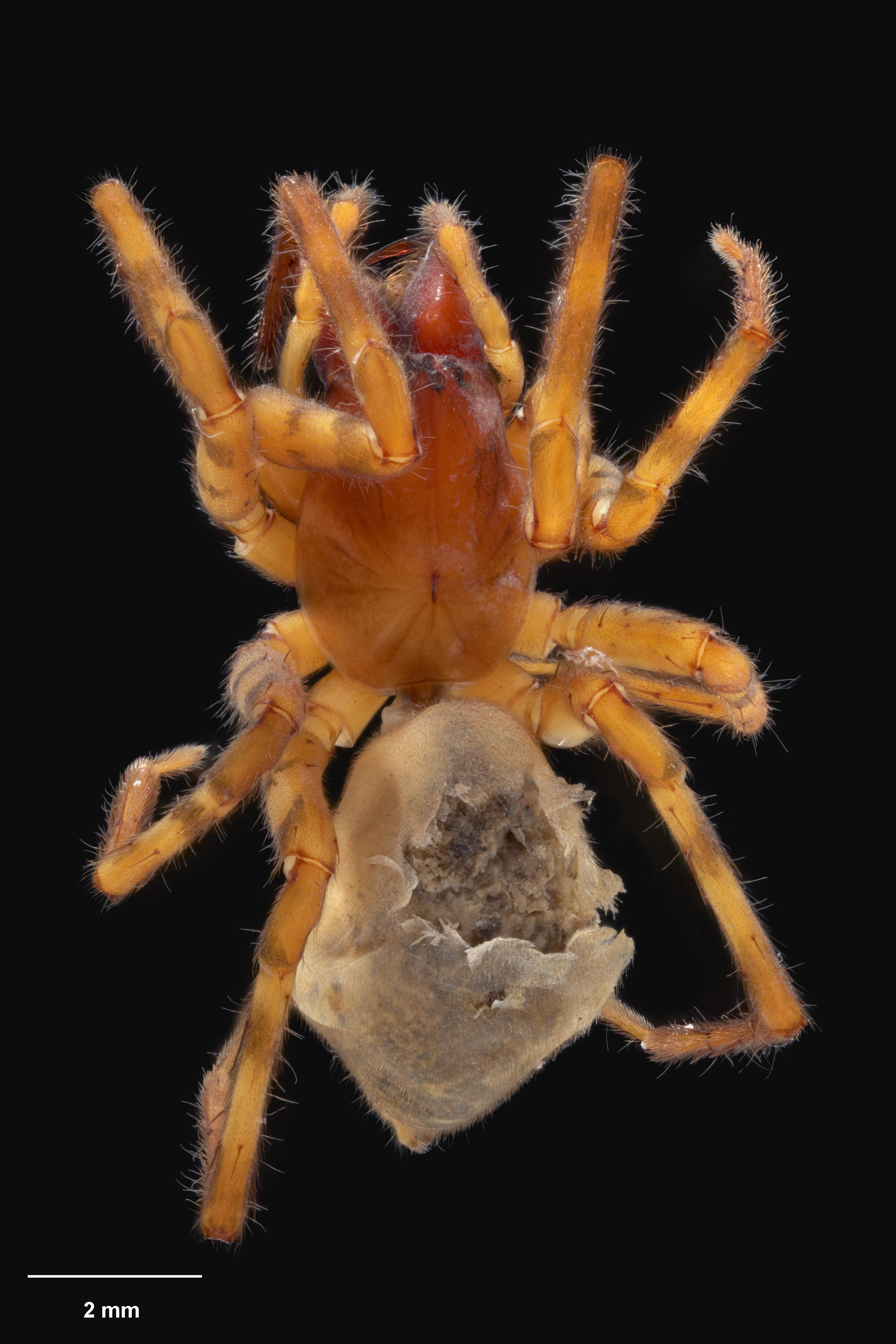

Conservation status
- Not Threatened (NZ TCS)

Scientific classification
- Kingdom: Animalia
- Phylum: Arthropoda
- Subphylum: Chelicerata
- Class: Arachnida
- Order: Araneae
- Infraorder: Araneomorphae
- Family: Desidae
- Genus: Mamoea
- Species: M. maorica

Binomial name
- Mamoea maorica Forster & Wilton, 1973

= Mamoea maorica =

Species of spider

Mamoea maorica is a species of Desidae that is endemic to New Zealand.

== Taxonomy ==
This species was described by Ray Forster and Cecil Wilton in 1973 from female and male specimens. The holotype is stored in Te Papa Museum under registration AS.000064.

== Description ==
The female is recorded at 8.67mm in length whereas the male is 7.65mm. The carapace is coloured yellow brown and is reddish brown anteriorly. The legs are yellow brown and has dark bands. The abdomen is creamy.

== Distribution ==
This species is only known from the lower end of New Zealand's North Island.

== Conservation status ==
Under the New Zealand Threat Classification System, this species is listed as "Not Threatened".
