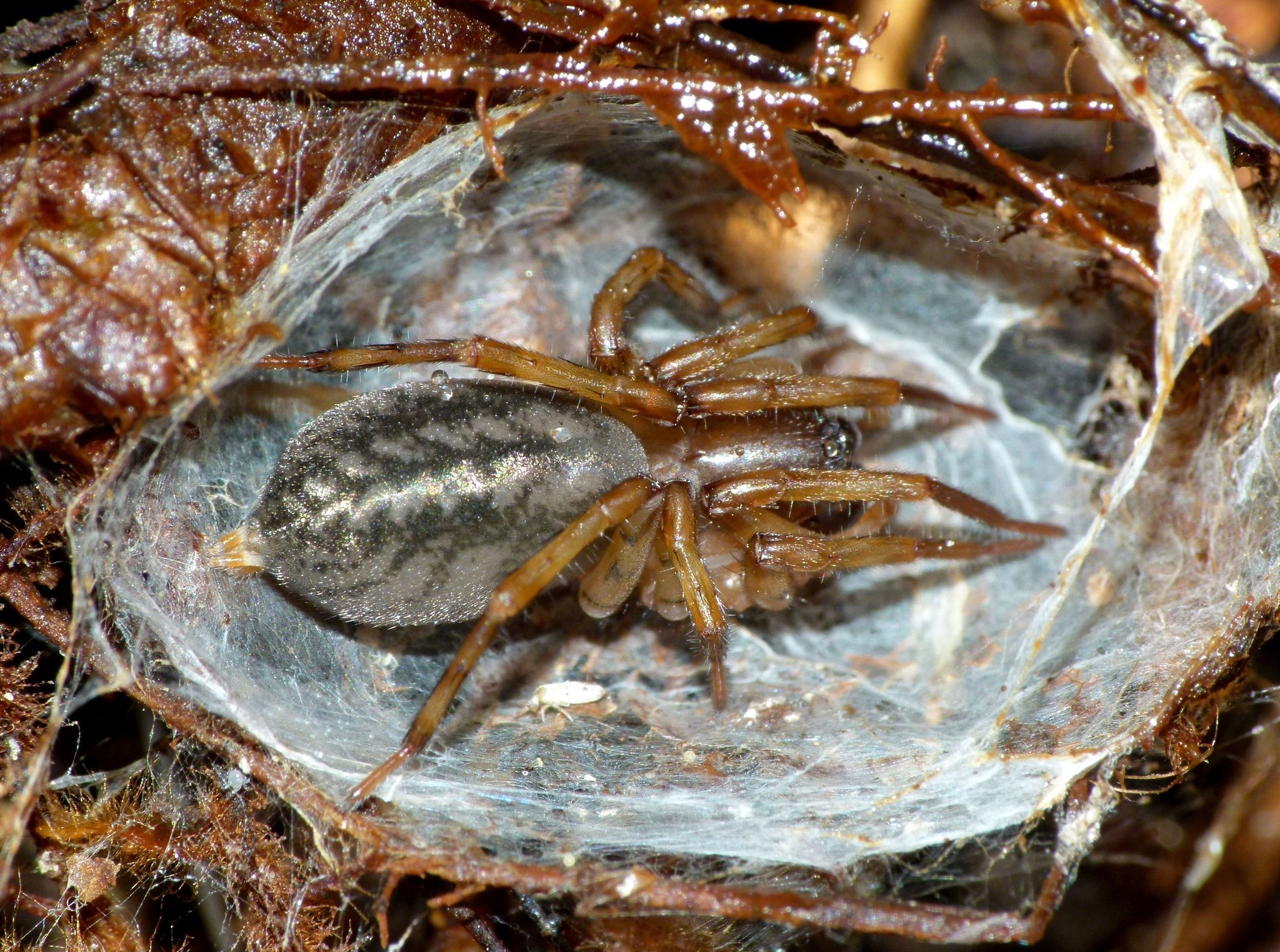
- Mamoea rufa

Scientific classification
- Kingdom: Animalia
- Phylum: Arthropoda
- Subphylum: Chelicerata
- Class: Arachnida
- Order: Araneae
- Infraorder: Araneomorphae
- Family: Desidae
- Genus: Mamoea; Forster & Wilton, 1973

Type species
- M. rufa (Berland, 1931)

Species
- 19, see text

= Mamoea =

Genus of spiders

Mamoea is a genus of intertidal spiders first described by Raymond Robert Forster & C. L. Wilton in 1973.

== Species ==
As of April 2019 it contains nineteen species, all found in New Zealand:

- Mamoea assimilis Forster & Wilton, 1973 – New Zealand
- Mamoea bicolor (Bryant, 1935) – New Zealand
- Mamoea cantuaria Forster & Wilton, 1973 – New Zealand
- Mamoea cooki Forster & Wilton, 1973 – New Zealand
- Mamoea florae Forster & Wilton, 1973 – New Zealand
- Mamoea grandiosa Forster & Wilton, 1973 – New Zealand
- Mamoea hesperis Forster & Wilton, 1973 – New Zealand
- Mamoea hughsoni Forster & Wilton, 1973 – New Zealand
- Mamoea inornata Forster & Wilson, 1973 – New Zealand
- Mamoea mandibularis (Bryant, 1935) – New Zealand
- Mamoea maorica Forster & Wilton, 1973 – New Zealand
- Mamoea montana Forster & Wilton, 1973 – New Zealand
- Mamoea monticola Forster & Wilton, 1973 – New Zealand
- Mamoea otira Forster & Wilton, 1973 – New Zealand
- Mamoea pilosa (Bryant, 1935) – New Zealand
- Mamoea rakiura Forster & Wilton, 1973 – New Zealand
- Mamoea rufa (Berland, 1931) – New Zealand (Campbell Is.)
- Mamoea unica Forster & Wilton, 1973 – New Zealand
- Mamoea westlandica Forster & Wilton, 1973 – New Zealand
