= Pseudafroneta maxima =

Conservation status
- Data Deficient (NZ TCS)

Scientific classification
- Domain: Eukaryota
- Kingdom: Animalia
- Phylum: Arthropoda
- Subphylum: Chelicerata
- Class: Arachnida
- Order: Araneae
- Infraorder: Araneomorphae
- Family: Linyphiidae
- Genus: Pseudafroneta
- Species: P. maxima

Binomial name
- Pseudafroneta maxima Blest, 1979

Species of spider

Pseudafroneta maxima is a species of sheet weaver spider endemic to New Zealand.

== Taxonomy ==
This species was described in 1979 by A.D Blest from a male specimen. The holotype is stored in Canterbury Museum.

== Description ==
The male is recorded at 5.5mm. This species has a brown cephalothorax and brown legs. The abdomen has pale markings.

== Distribution ==
This species is only known from Canterbury, New Zealand.

== Conservation status ==
Under the New Zealand Threat Classification System, this species is listed as "Data Deficient" with the qualifiers of "Data Poor: Size", "Data Poor: Trend" and "One Location".
