= Anasaitis locuples =

Scientific classification
- Kingdom: Animalia
- Phylum: Arthropoda
- Subphylum: Chelicerata
- Class: Arachnida
- Order: Araneae
- Infraorder: Araneomorphae
- Family: Salticidae
- Genus: Anasaitis
- Species: A. locuples

Binomial name
- Anasaitis locuples Simon, 1888

Synonyms
- Corythalia locuples

Species of jumping spider

Anasaitis locuples, also known as Corythalia locuples, is a brightly colored species of spider within the family Salticidae (jumping spiders), and the genus Anasaitis. Anasaitis locuples has a distinct metallic, or iridescent, blue and black cephalothorax, with a golden abdomen in the form of a cross. The species is endemic to Hispaniola (in the Dominican Republic and Haiti).
