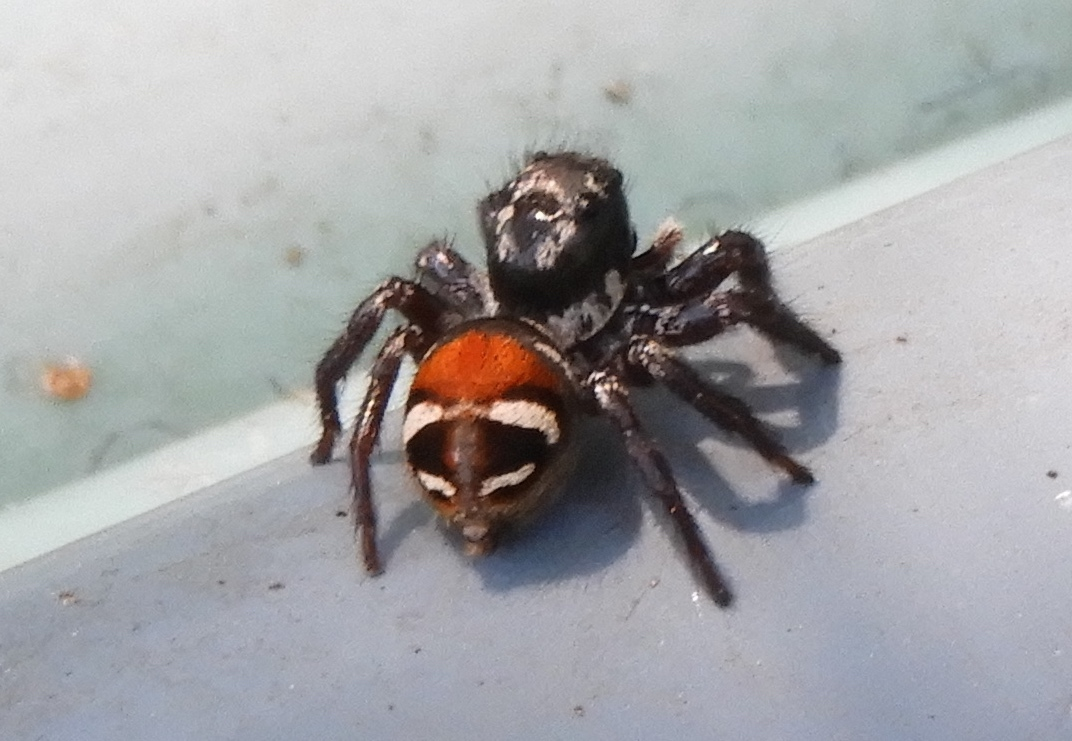
- female from Mexico
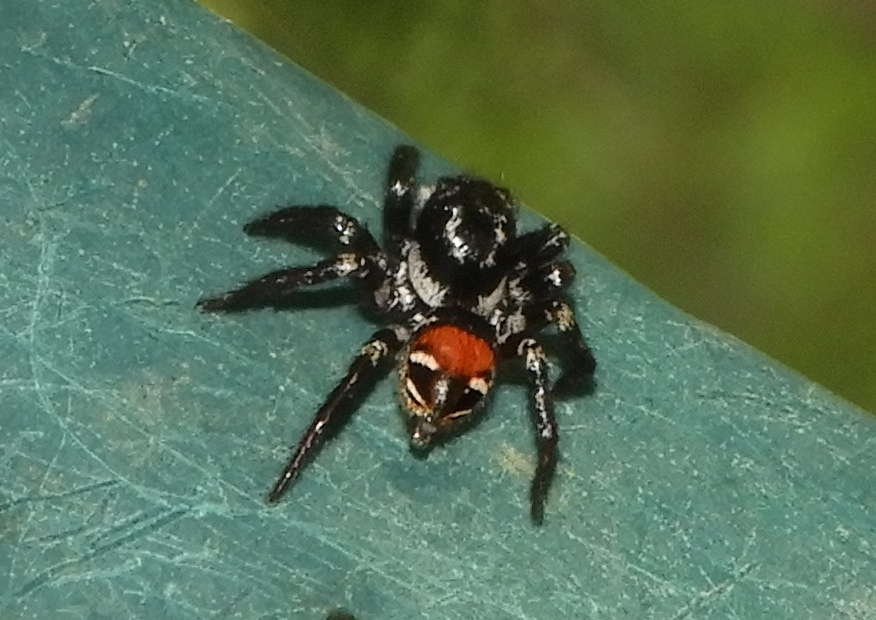
- male from Mexico

Scientific classification
- Kingdom: Animalia
- Phylum: Arthropoda
- Subphylum: Chelicerata
- Class: Arachnida
- Order: Araneae
- Infraorder: Araneomorphae
- Family: Salticidae
- Genus: Corythalia
- Species: C. opima

Binomial name
- Corythalia opima (G. W. Peckham & E. G. Peckham, 1885)

Synonyms
- Jotus opimus G. W. Peckham & E. G. Peckham, 1885; Dynamius opimus (G. W. Peckham & E. G. Peckham, 1885); Sidusa fulvoguttata F. O. Pickard-Cambridge, 1901; Sidusa opima (G. W. Peckham & E. G. Peckham, 1885); Corythalia fulvoguttata (F. O. Pickard-Cambridge, 1901)

= Corythalia opima =

Species of spider

Corythalia opima is a species of jumping spider in the family Salticidae. It is found in the United States, Mexico, Guatemala, and El Salvador.

== Taxonomy ==
The species was originally described as Jotus opimus by G. W. Peckham and E. G. Peckham in 1885. It was subsequently transferred to the genera Dynamius and Sidusa before being placed in its current genus Corythalia by Simon in 1901. The species has a complex taxonomic history, with Sidusa fulvoguttata F. O. Pickard-Cambridge, 1901 being synonymized with C. opima by Chickering in 1946, a decision that was confirmed by Bayer, Höfer & Metzner in 2020.

== Distribution ==
C. opima has been recorded from the southwestern United States, Mexico, Guatemala, and El Salvador.

== Description ==
=== Female ===
The female is larger than the male, with a total length of 10.7 mm and an abdominal width of 3.4 mm. The cephalothorax measures 5 mm in length, 3.7 mm in width, and 2.7 mm in height. The posterior slope of the cephalothorax is less rounded than in males. The quadrangle of eyes is one-eighth wider than long, and the anterior lateral eyes are somewhat more separated from the middle eyes than in males.

=== Male ===
The male has a total length of 8 mm with an abdominal width of 2.5 mm. The cephalothorax measures 3.9 mm in length, 2.5 mm in width, and 2 mm in height. The cephalothorax is high and convex, with a slight dilation behind the dorsal eyes. The cephalic and thoracic parts are separated by a depression, with the cephalic part occupying two-thirds of the cephalothorax and inclined forward with vertical sides.

The eye arrangement is characteristic of jumping spiders, with the quadrangle of eyes slightly less than one-eighth wider than long. The first row of eyes is moderately curved and barely visible from above, while the middle eyes are subtouching and about 1.5 times as large as the lateral eyes. The clypeus is inclined backward and measures three-fifths the height of the middle eyes.

The chelicerae are robust, nearly equaling the first row of eyes in width, and are slightly longer than the face. They are parallel and inclined backward, with a very short fang.

=== Coloration ===
Both sexes display distinctive coloration patterns. The cephalothorax is black with patches of whitish hairs above the middle anterior eyes and smaller patches behind the second row of eyes. Longitudinal bands of white hairs extend behind the dorsal eyes on each side, becoming narrower and curved as they pass backward. The abdomen is black at the base with whitish-yellow hairs and sometimes features a transverse line of white hairs. A large spot of bright red hairs occupies the central anterior portion of the dorsum, taking the form of an obtuse triangle in males.

The legs are brownish or black, with males showing a distinctive brilliant bluish metallic luster on the patella of the third leg. The palpus is brown with darker distal segments, while the sternum, coxae, and chelicerae are brown. The maxillae and labium are brown, usually tipped with white.

== Etymology ==
The specific name opima means "rich" or "corpulent" in Latin.
