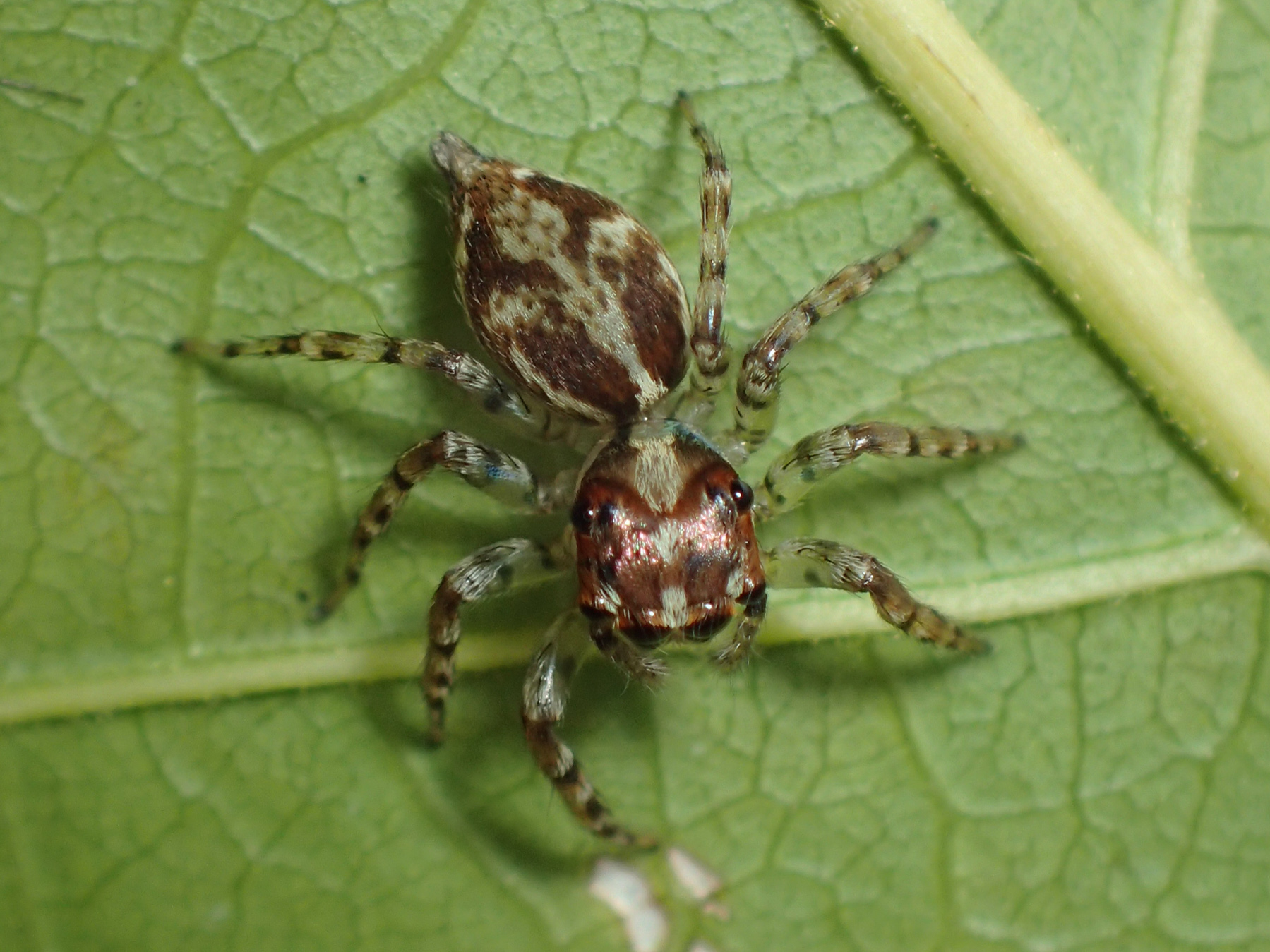
- Female, species unknown

Scientific classification
- Kingdom: Animalia
- Phylum: Arthropoda
- Subphylum: Chelicerata
- Class: Arachnida
- Order: Araneae
- Infraorder: Araneomorphae
- Family: Salticidae
- Subfamily: Salticinae
- Genus: Compsodecta; Simon, 1903

Type species
- C. grisea (Peckham & Peckham, 1901)

Species
- 8, see text

Synonyms
- Paradecta Bryant, 1950

= Compsodecta =

Genus of spiders

Compsodecta is a genus of Caribbean jumping spiders that was first described by Eugène Louis Simon in 1903.

== Species ==
As of June 2019 it contains eight species, found only in Jamaica and on the Greater Antilles:

- Compsodecta darlingtoni (Bryant, 1950) – Jamaica
- Compsodecta defloccata (Peckham & Peckham, 1901) – Jamaica
- Compsodecta festiva (Bryant, 1950) – Jamaica
- Compsodecta gratiosa (Bryant, 1950) – Jamaica
- Compsodecta grisea (Peckham & Peckham, 1901) (type) – Jamaica
- Compsodecta haytiensis (Banks, 1903) – Hispaniola
- Compsodecta peckhami Bryant, 1943 – Hispaniola
- Compsodecta valida (Bryant, 1950) – Jamaica
