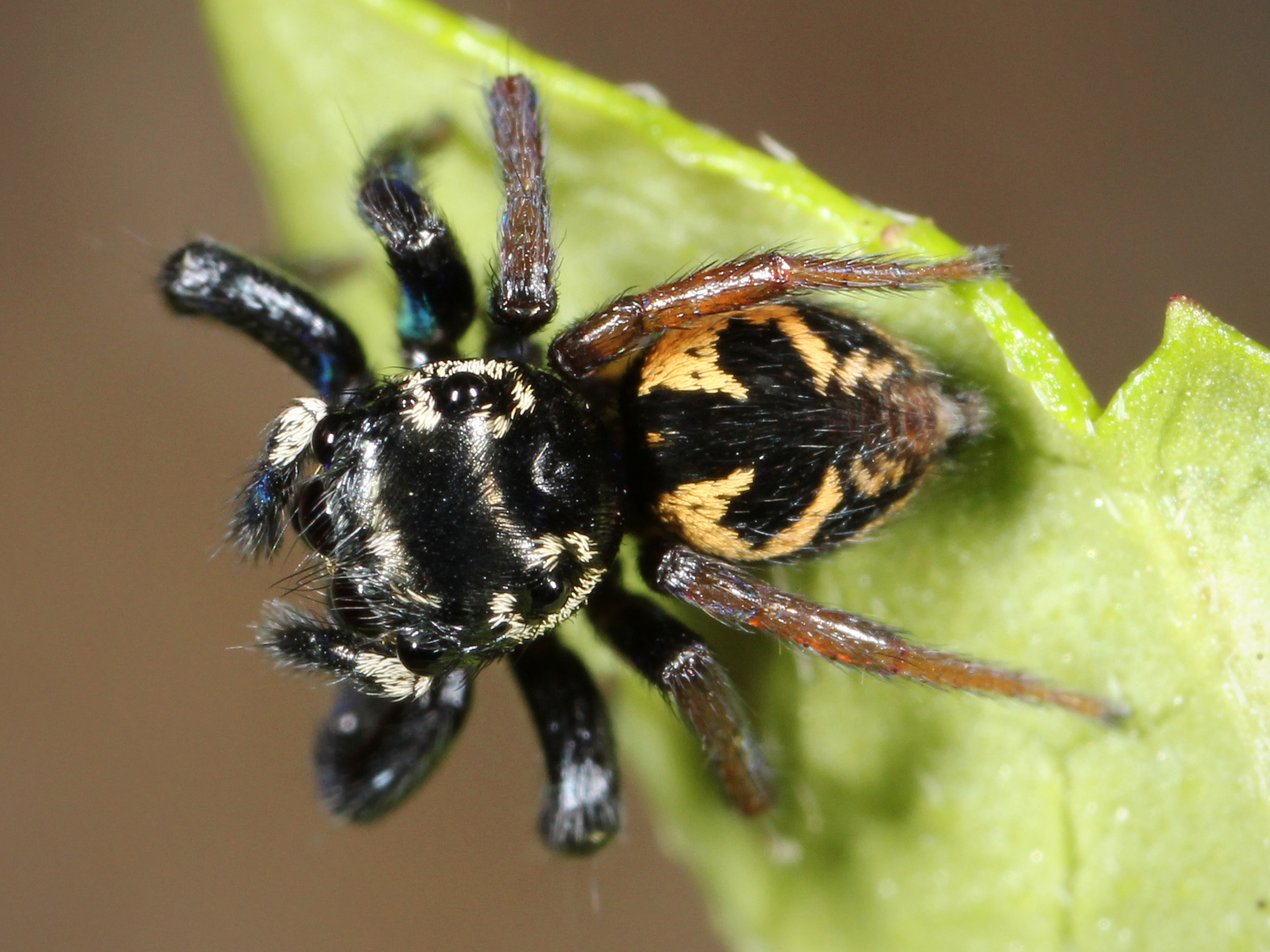

Scientific classification
- Kingdom: Animalia
- Phylum: Arthropoda
- Subphylum: Chelicerata
- Class: Arachnida
- Order: Araneae
- Infraorder: Araneomorphae
- Family: Salticidae
- Subfamily: Salticinae
- Genus: Corythalia; C. L. Koch, 1850

Type species
- C. latipes (C. L. Koch, 1846)

Species
- see text

Synonyms
- Dinattus Bryant, 1943; Dynamius Simon, 1888; Escambia Peckham & Peckham, 1896; Makthalia Badcock, 1932; Taeoma Mello-Leitão, 1939

= Corythalia =

Corythalia Temporal range: Neogene– Present

Genus of spiders

Corythalia is a genus of jumping spiders that was first described by Carl Ludwig Koch in 1850. Species in this genus are found from Mexico to Argentina, with the range of C. opima extending into the United States.

== Species ==
As of December 2025, this genus includes ninety species:

- Corythalia alacris (G. W. Peckham & E. G. Peckham, 1896) – Guatemala
- Corythalia albicincta (F. O. Pickard-Cambridge, 1901) – Central America
- Corythalia antepagmenti Bayer, Höfer & Metzner, 2020 – Brazil
- Corythalia argentinensis Galiano, 1962 – Argentina
- Corythalia bicincta Petrunkevitch, 1925 – Panama
- Corythalia binotata (F. O. Pickard-Cambridge, 1901) – Mexico
- Corythalia blanda (G. W. Peckham & E. G. Peckham, 1901) – Venezuela, Trinidad and Tobago
- Corythalia bonairensis (van Hasselt, 1887) – Bonaire
- Corythalia brevispina (F. O. Pickard-Cambridge, 1901) – Guatemala, Colombia
- Corythalia broccai Zhang & Maddison, 2012 – Hispaniola
- Corythalia bromelicola Zhang & Maddison, 2012 – Hispaniola
- Corythalia bryantae Chickering, 1946 – Panama
- Corythalia chalcea Crane, 1948 – Venezuela
- Corythalia chickeringi Kraus, 1955 – El Salvador
- Corythalia cincta (Badcock, 1932) – Paraguay
- Corythalia circumcincta (F. O. Pickard-Cambridge, 1901) – Mexico
- Corythalia circumflexa (Mello-Leitão, 1939) – Venezuela
- Corythalia clara Chamberlin & Ivie, 1936 – Panama
- Corythalia concinna Bayer, Höfer & Metzner, 2020 – Brazil
- Corythalia conferta Bayer, Höfer & Metzner, 2020 – Brazil, Paraguay, Argentina
- Corythalia conformans Chamberlin & Ivie, 1936 – Panama
- Corythalia conspecta (G. W. Peckham & E. G. Peckham, 1896) – United States, Mexico, Guatemala, El Salvador, Costa Rica, Panama
- Corythalia coronai Zhang & Maddison, 2012 – Hispaniola
- Corythalia cristata (F. O. Pickard-Cambridge, 1901) – Mexico
- Corythalia dakryodes Bayer, 2020 – Colombia, Ecuador
- Corythalia decora (Bryant, 1943) – Hispaniola
- Corythalia diffusa Chamberlin & Ivie, 1936 – Panama
- Corythalia drepane Bayer, Höfer & Metzner, 2020 – Brazil
- Corythalia drepanopsis Bayer, Höfer & Metzner, 2020 – Brazil
- Corythalia electa (G. W. Peckham & E. G. Peckham, 1901) – Colombia
- Corythalia erebus (Bryant, 1943) – Hispaniola
- Corythalia excavata (F. O. Pickard-Cambridge, 1901) – Mexico
- Corythalia fimbriata (G. W. Peckham & E. G. Peckham, 1901) – Brazil
- Corythalia flagrans Bayer, Höfer & Metzner, 2020 – Brazil
- Corythalia flavida (F. O. Pickard-Cambridge, 1901) – Guatemala
- Corythalia foelixi Bayer, 2020 – Guyana, French Guiana
- Corythalia fragilis Bayer, Höfer & Metzner, 2020 – Brazil
- Corythalia fulgipedia Crane, 1948 – Venezuela, French Guiana, Brazil
- Corythalia gasnieri Bayer, Höfer & Metzner, 2020 – Brazil
- Corythalia grata (G. W. Peckham & E. G. Peckham, 1901) – Brazil
- Corythalia hadzji Caporiacco, 1947 – Guyana
- Corythalia hamulifera Bayer, 2020 – Ecuador
- Corythalia heros (Bryant, 1943) – Hispaniola
- Corythalia insularis Ruiz, Brescovit & Freitas, 2007 – Brazil (Fernando de Noronha Islands)
- Corythalia iridescens Petrunkevitch, 1926 – Virgin Islands
- Corythalia latior Bayer, Höfer & Metzner, 2020 – Bolivia
- Corythalia latipes (C. L. Koch, 1846) – Brazil (type species)
- Corythalia lineata Bayer, 2020 – Guyana
- Corythalia longiducta Bayer, Höfer & Metzner, 2020 – Brazil
- Corythalia luctuosa Caporiacco, 1954 – French Guiana, Brazil
- Corythalia metallica (G. W. Peckham & E. G. Peckham, 1894) – St. Vincent and the Grenadines
- Corythalia minor (Bryant, 1943) – Hispaniola
- Corythalia modesta Chickering, 1946 – Panama
- Corythalia murcida (F. O. Pickard-Cambridge, 1901) – Central America
- Corythalia neglecta Kraus, 1955 – El Salvador
- Corythalia nigriventer (F. O. Pickard-Cambridge, 1901) – Mexico, Panama
- Corythalia nigropicta (F. O. Pickard-Cambridge, 1901) – Central America
- Corythalia noda (Chamberlin, 1916) – Peru
- Corythalia obsoleta Banks, 1929 – Panama
- Corythalia opima (G. W. Peckham & E. G. Peckham, 1885) – United States, Mexico, Guatemala, El Salvador, Panama
- Corythalia panamana Petrunkevitch, 1925 – Panama
- Corythalia parva (G. W. Peckham & E. G. Peckham, 1901) – Brazil
- Corythalia parvula (G. W. Peckham & E. G. Peckham, 1896) – Mexico to Panama
- Corythalia peblique Zhang & Maddison, 2012 – Hispaniola
- Corythalia penicillata (F. O. Pickard-Cambridge, 1901) – Mexico, Guatemala
- Corythalia pequii Bedoya-Róqueme, 2022 – Brazil
- Corythalia placata (G. W. Peckham & E. G. Peckham, 1901) – Trinidad and Tobago, Venezuela (?)
- Corythalia porphyra Brüning & Cutler, 1995 – Costa Rica
- Corythalia protensa Bayer, Höfer & Metzner, 2020 – Brazil
- Corythalia pulchra Petrunkevitch, 1925 – Panama
- Corythalia quadriguttata (F. O. Pickard-Cambridge, 1901) – Mexico to Panama
- Corythalia ricti Bayer, 2020 – Guyana
- Corythalia roeweri Kraus, 1955 – El Salvador
- Corythalia rugosa Kraus, 1955 – El Salvador
- Corythalia scutellaris Bayer, 2020 – Ecuador
- Corythalia sellata Simon, 1901 – presumably Neotropics/South America
- Corythalia spiralis (F. O. Pickard-Cambridge, 1901) – Panama, Colombia, Venezuela, French Guiana, Brazil
- Corythalia spirorbis (F. O. Pickard-Cambridge, 1901) – Panama
- Corythalia sulphurea (F. O. Pickard-Cambridge, 1901) – Costa Rica, Panama
- Corythalia tribulosa Bayer, Höfer & Metzner, 2020 – Colombia
- Corythalia tristriata Bryant, 1942 – Puerto Rico
- Corythalia trochophora Bayer, 2020 – Ecuador
- Corythalia tropica (Mello-Leitão, 1939) – Venezuela
- Corythalia ursina (Mello-Leitão, 1940) – Guyana
- Corythalia valida (G. W. Peckham & E. G. Peckham, 1901) – Brazil
- Corythalia verhaaghi Bayer, Höfer & Metzner, 2020 – Brazil
- Corythalia vervloeti Soares & Camargo, 1948 – Ecuador, Brazil
- Corythalia voluta (F. O. Pickard-Cambridge, 1901) – El Salvador, Panama
- Corythalia waleckii (Taczanowski, 1871) – Venezuela, Trinidad and Tobago, Guyana, French Guiana
- Corythalia xanthopa Crane, 1948 – Venezuela
