= Grammonota tabuna =

Scientific classification
- Domain: Eukaryota
- Kingdom: Animalia
- Phylum: Arthropoda
- Subphylum: Chelicerata
- Class: Arachnida
- Order: Araneae
- Infraorder: Araneomorphae
- Family: Linyphiidae
- Genus: Grammonota
- Species: G. tabuna

Binomial name
- Grammonota tabuna Chickering, 1970

Species of spider

Grammonota tabuna, the sheet-web spiders, is a species of dwarf spider in the family Linyphiidae. It is found in Costa Rica and Panama.
