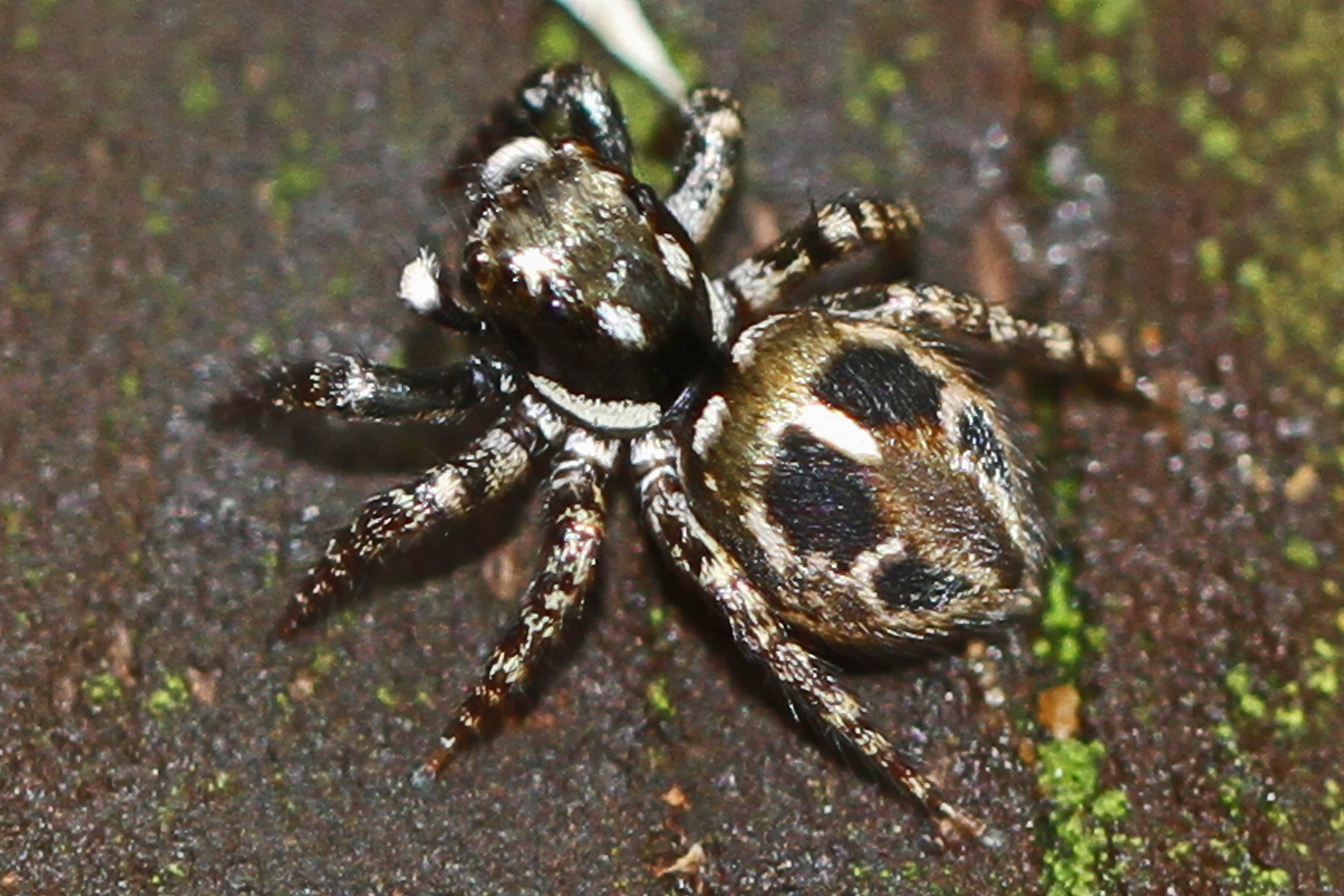
- Female Anasaitis canosa from Okefenokee National Wildlife Refuge, Folkston, Georgia

Scientific classification
- Kingdom: Animalia
- Phylum: Arthropoda
- Subphylum: Chelicerata
- Class: Arachnida
- Order: Araneae
- Infraorder: Araneomorphae
- Family: Salticidae
- Subfamily: Salticinae
- Genus: Anasaitis; Bryant, 1950

Type species
- A. morgani (Peckham & Peckham, 1901)

Species
- 21, see text

Synonyms
- Maeotella Bryant, 1950

= Anasaitis =

Genus of spiders

Anasaitis is a genus of jumping spiders (family Salticidae) that was first described by E. B. Bryant in 1950. The name is derived from the salticid genus Saitis.

== Species ==
As of April 2024, the World Spider Catalog accepted the following species:

- Anasaitis adorabilis Zhang & Maddison, 2012 – Hispaniola
- Anasaitis arcuatus (Franganillo, 1930) – Cuba
- Anasaitis banksi (Roewer, 1951) – Hispaniola, Puerto Rico
- Anasaitis brunneus Zhang & Maddison, 2012 – Hispaniola
- Anasaitis canalis (Chamberlin, 1925) – Panama, Colombia
- Anasaitis canosus (Walckenaer, 1837) – USA, Cuba
- Anasaitis champetera Galvis, Zapata-M & Malumbres-Olarte, 2020 – Colombia
- Anasaitis cubanus (Roewer, 1951) – Cuba
- Anasaitis decoris Bryant, 1950 – Jamaica
- Anasaitis elegantissimus (Simon, 1888) – Hispaniola
- Anasaitis emertoni (Bryant, 1940) – Cuba
- Anasaitis gloriae (Petrunkevitch, 1930) – Puerto Rico
- Anasaitis hebetatus Zhang & Maddison, 2012 – Hispaniola
- Anasaitis laxus Zhang & Maddison, 2012 – Hispaniola
- Anasaitis locuples (Simon, 1888) – Hispaniola
- Anasaitis milesae Logunov, 2024 – Presumably Caribbean. Introduced to Britain
- Anasaitis morgani (G. W. Peckham & E. G. Peckham, 1901) (type species) – Jamaica, Hispaniola
- Anasaitis peckhami (Petrunkevitch, 1914) – Dominican Rep.
- Anasaitis perplexus (G. W. Peckham & E. G. Peckham, 1901) – Jamaica, Hispaniola
- Anasaitis placidus (Bryant, 1947) – Puerto Rico (Mona Is.)
- Anasaitis scintillus Bryant, 1950 – Jamaica
- Anasaitis squamatus (Bryant, 1940) – Cuba, Turks & Caicos
- Anasaitis venatorius (G. W. Peckham & E. G. Peckham, 1901) – Jamaica
