= Elizabeth B. Bryant =

American arachnologist

Elizabeth Bangs Bryant
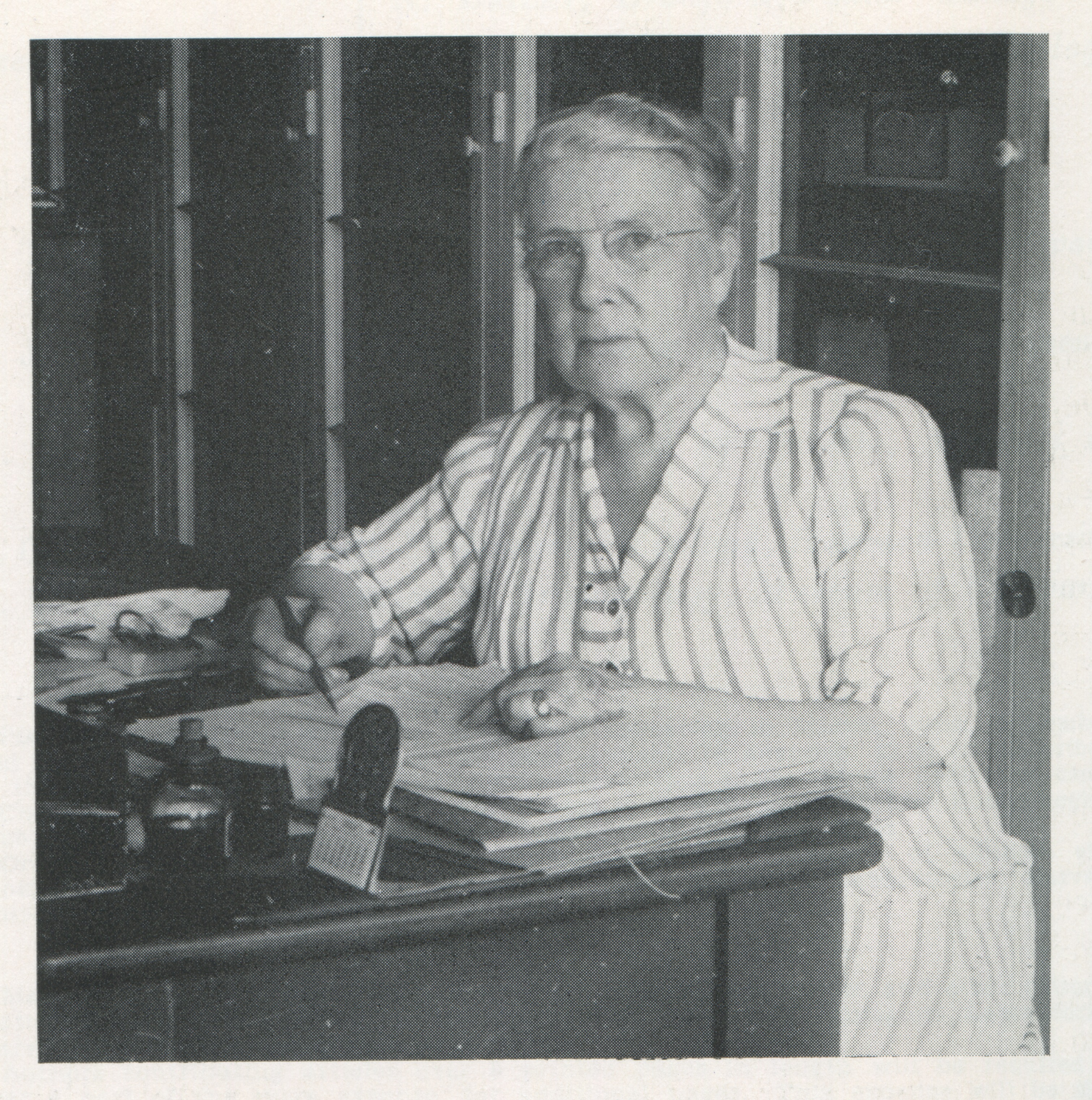
- From the Ernst Mayr Library and Archives of the Museum of Comparative Zoology, Harvard University
- Born: 7 April 1875; Massachusetts United States
- Died: 6 January 1953
- Education: Radcliffe College
- Scientific career
- Fields: Arachnology
- Workplaces: Museum of Comparative Zoology

Elizabeth Bangs Bryant (April 7, 1875 – January 6, 1953) was an American arachnologist. She worked at the Museum of Comparative Zoology in Cambridge, Massachusetts and was a close acquaintance of James Henry Emerton. She is best known for her studies of the spiders of New England and the Caribbean.

Elizabeth was born to a wealthy Boston family and attended Radcliffe College. She would have graduated with the Radcliffe class of 1897 but left after only three years without finishing her degree.

She started her work at the Museum of Comparative Zoology as a volunteer in 1898. In the 1930s she was promoted the assistant curator of spiders and received a small salary. Her work included collections care of the wet specimens as well as taxonomic research. She officially retired from the museum in 1950 but continued to work on the spider collections until her death.

After her death, a memorial written by her colleague and friend, Elisabeth Deichmann, described her as having a proper sedate exterior that hid a youthful spirit. In her youth she took part in collecting trips in New England and had a substantial personal spider collection that she donated to the Museum of Comparative Zoology.

== Taxa described ==
Bryant named and described the following spider taxa:

- Allodecta Bryant, 1950
- Anasaitis Bryant, 1950
- Antillognatha Bryant, 1945
- Hispanognatha Bryant, 1945
- Habronattus trimaculatus Bryant, 1945
- Dinattus Bryant, 1943
- Modisimus fuscus Bryant, 1948
- Paradecta Bryant, 1950

== Taxa named in her honor ==
- Bryantella (Chickering, 1946)
- Bryantina (Brignoli, 1985)

== Publications ==
- 1908 List of Araneina in Fauna of New England, 9. Occ. Pap. Boston Soc. Nat. Hist., vol. 7, pp. 1–105.
- 1923 Report on the spiders collected by the Barbados-Antigua Expedition from the University of Iowa in 1918. Univ. Iowa Stud. in Nat. Hist., vol. 10, pp. 10–16.
- 1930 A revision of the American species oi the genus Ozyptila. Psyche, vol. 37, pp. 375–391.
- 1930 New species of the genus Xysticus, (Arachnida). Psyche, vol. 37, pp. 132–140.
- 1931 Notes on North American Anyphaeninae in the Museum of Comparative Zoology. Psyche, vol. 38, pp. 102–126.
- 1933 New and little known spiders from the United States. Bull. Mus. Comp. Zool., vol. 74, pp. 171–193.
- 1933 Notes on types of Urquhart’s spiders. Rec. Canterbury Mus., vol. 4, pp. 1–27.
- 1934 New Lycosidae from Florida. Psyche, vol. 41, pp. 38–41.
- 1935 Notes on some of Urquhart’s species of spiders. Rec. Canterbury Mus., vol. 4, pp. 53–70.
- 1935 Some new and little known species of New Zealand spiders. Rec. Canterbury Mus., vol. 4, pp. 71–94.
- 1935 A few southern spiders, Psyche, vol. 42, pp. 73–83.
- 1935 A rare spider. Psyche, vol. 42, pp. 163–166.
- 1936 New species of southern spiders. Psyche, vol. 43, pp. 87–100.
- 1936 Descriptions of some new species of Cuban spiders. Mem. Soc. Cubana Hist. Nat., vol. 10, pp. 325–332.
- 1938 Spiders in the Museum of Comparative Zoology, Harvard Alumni Bull., Feb. 25.
- 1940 Notes on Epeira pentagona Hentz. Psyche, vol. 47, pp. 60–65 (with A. F. Archer).
- 1940 Cuban spiders in the Museum of Comparative Zoology. Bull. Mus. Comp. Zool., vol. 86, pp. 247–532.
- 1941 Notes on the spider fauna of New England. Psyche, vol. 48, pp. 129–146.
- 1942 Notes on the spiders of the Virgin Islands. Bull. Mus. Comp. Zool., vol. 89, pp. 317–363.
- 1942 Additions to the spider iauna of Puerto Rico. Jour. Agr. Univ. Puerto Rico, vol. 26, pp. 1–19.
- 1942 Descriptions of certain North American Phidippus (Araneae). Amer. Midland Nat., vol. 28, pp. 693–707.
- 1943 The salticid spiders of Hispaniola. Bull. Mus. Comp. Zool., vol. 92, pp. 443–522.
- 1943 Notes on Dictyolathys maculata Banks (Araneae: Dictynidae). Psyche, vol. 50, pp. 83–86.
- 1944 Three species of Coleosoma from Florida (Araneae: Theridiidae). Psyche, vol. 51, pp. 51–58.
- 1945 The Argiopidae of Hispaniola. Bull. Mus. Comp. Zool., vol 95, pp. 357–418.
- 1945 Notes on some Florida spiders. Trans. Connecticut Acad. Sci., vol. 36, pp. 199–213.
- 1945 Some new and little known southern spiders, Psyche, vol. 52, pp. 178–192.
- 1946 The genotype of Mimetus Hentz. Psyche, vol. 53, p. 48.
- 1947 A list of spiders from Mona Island with descriptions of new and little known species. Psyche, vol. 54, pp. 86–89.
- 1947 Notes on spiders from Puerto Rico. Psyche, vol. 54, pp. 183–193.
- 1948 The spiders of Hispaniola. Bull. Mus. Comp. Zool., vol. 100, pp. 329–447.
- 1948 Some spiders from Acapulco, Mexico. Psyche, vol. 55, pp. 55–77.
- 1949 The male of Prodidomus rufus Hentz (Prodidomidae, Araneae). Psyche, vol. 56, pp. 22–25.
- 1949 A new genus and species of Theridiidae rom eastern Texas (Araneae). Psyche, vol. 56, pp. 66–69.
- 1949 The "Iris spider" of Kent Island. Bull. Ninth Annual Rep., Bowdoin Sci. Sta. no. 11, pp. 14–15
- 1949 Acanthepeira venusta (Banks) (Araneae). Psyche, vol. 56, pp. 175–179.
- 1950 The salticid spiders of Jamaica. Bull. Mus. Comp. Zool., vol. 103, pp. 161–209.
- 1951 Redescription of Cheiracanthium mildei L. Koch, a recent spider immigrant from Europe. Psyche, vol. 58, pp. :20-123.

List of articles by Bryant available in the Biodiversity Heritage Library.
