= Paramamoea parva =

Conservation status
- Not Threatened (NZ TCS)

Scientific classification
- Kingdom: Animalia
- Phylum: Arthropoda
- Subphylum: Chelicerata
- Class: Arachnida
- Order: Araneae
- Infraorder: Araneomorphae
- Family: Desidae
- Genus: Paramamoea
- Species: P. parva

Binomial name
- Paramamoea parva Forster & Wilton, 1973

Species of spider

Paramamoea parva is a species of spider in the family Desidae that is endemic to New Zealand.

== Taxonomy ==
This species was described by Ray Forster and Cecil Wilton in 1973 from female and male specimens. The holotype is stored in Auckland War Memorial Museum under registration number AMNZ5065.

== Description ==
The female is recorded at 2.92mm in length whereas the male is 2.75mm. The carapace is coloured dark reddish brown. The legs are orange brown. The abdomen is greyish black dorsally with white markings.

== Distribution ==
This species is only known from Northland, New Zealand.

== Conservation status ==
Under the New Zealand Threat Classification System, this species is listed as "Not Threatened".
