= Dunstanoides hesperis =

Conservation status
- Not Threatened (NZ TCS)

Scientific classification
- Kingdom: Animalia
- Phylum: Arthropoda
- Subphylum: Chelicerata
- Class: Arachnida
- Order: Araneae
- Infraorder: Araneomorphae
- Family: Desidae
- Genus: Dunstanoides
- Species: D. hesperis

Binomial name
- Dunstanoides hesperis (Forster & Wilton, 1973)

Species of spider

Dunstanoides hesperis is a species of Desidae that is endemic to New Zealand.

== Taxonomy ==
This species was described by Ray Forster and Cecil Wilton in 1973 from female and male specimens. The holotype is stored in Otago Museum.

== Description ==
The female is recorded at 3.65mm in length whereas the male is 3.55mm. The carapace is coloured pale cream. The legs are uniform in colour. The abdomen has a chevron pattern dorsally.

== Distribution ==
This species is only known from Westland, New Zealand.

== Conservation status ==
Under the New Zealand Threat Classification System, this species is listed as "Not Threatened" with the qualifier of "Data Poor: Size" and "Data Poor: Trend".
