= Dunstanoides nuntia =

Conservation status
- Data Deficient (NZ TCS)

Scientific classification
- Domain: Eukaryota
- Kingdom: Animalia
- Phylum: Arthropoda
- Subphylum: Chelicerata
- Class: Arachnida
- Order: Araneae
- Infraorder: Araneomorphae
- Family: Desidae
- Genus: Dunstanoides
- Species: D. nuntia

Binomial name
- Dunstanoides nuntia (Marples, 1959)

Synonyms
- Ixeuticus nuntius; Marplesia nuntia

Species of spider

Dunstanoides nuntia is a species of Desidae that is endemic to New Zealand.

== Taxonomy ==
This species was described as Ixeuticus nuntius by Brian John Marples in 1959 from a female specimen. It was most recently revised in 1973. The holotype is stored in Otago Museum.

== Description ==
The female is recorded at 3.54mm in length. The cephalothorax is coloured pale brown with shading around the eyes. The legs are pale yellow. The abdomen is pale with a chevron pattern dorsally.

== Distribution ==
This species is only known from Westland, New Zealand.

== Conservation status ==
Under the New Zealand Threat Classification System, this species is listed as "Data Deficient" with the qualifier of "Data Poor: Size", "Data Poor: Trend" and "One Location".
