= Goyenia fresa =

Conservation status
- Not Threatened (NZ TCS)

Scientific classification
- Kingdom: Animalia
- Phylum: Arthropoda
- Subphylum: Chelicerata
- Class: Arachnida
- Order: Araneae
- Infraorder: Araneomorphae
- Family: Desidae
- Genus: Goyenia
- Species: G. fresa

Binomial name
- Goyenia fresa Forster, 1970

Species of spider

Goyenia fresa is a species of Desidae spider that is endemic to New Zealand.

== Taxonomy ==
This species was described in 1970 by Ray Forster from female and male specimens. The holotype is stored in Otago Museum.

== Description ==
The female is recorded at 7.48mm in length whereas the male is 5.52mm. The body is coloured pale cream. The abdomen has dark patches dorsally. The male is identical.

== Distribution ==
This species is only known from Westland, New Zealand.

== Conservation status ==
Under the New Zealand Threat Classification System, this species is listed as "Not Threatened".
