= Goyenia lucrosa =

Conservation status
- Not Threatened (NZ TCS)

Scientific classification
- Domain: Eukaryota
- Kingdom: Animalia
- Phylum: Arthropoda
- Subphylum: Chelicerata
- Class: Arachnida
- Order: Araneae
- Infraorder: Araneomorphae
- Family: Desidae
- Genus: Goyenia
- Species: G. lucrosa

Binomial name
- Goyenia lucrosa Forster, 1970

Species of spider

Goyenia lucrosa is a species of Desidae spider that is endemic to New Zealand.

== Taxonomy ==
This species was described in 1970 by Ray Forster from male and female specimens. The holotype is stored in Otago Museum.

== Description ==
The male is recorded at 4.76mm in length whereas the female is 6.10mm.

== Distribution ==
This species is only known from Otago, New Zealand.

== Conservation status ==
Under the New Zealand Threat Classification System, this species is listed as "Not Threatened".
