= Dunstanoides angustiae =

Conservation status
- Data Deficient (NZ TCS)

Scientific classification
- Domain: Eukaryota
- Kingdom: Animalia
- Phylum: Arthropoda
- Subphylum: Chelicerata
- Class: Arachnida
- Order: Araneae
- Infraorder: Araneomorphae
- Family: Desidae
- Genus: Dunstanoides
- Species: D. angustiae

Binomial name
- Dunstanoides angustiae (Marples, 1959)

Synonyms
- Ixeuticus angustiae; Marplesia angustiae

Species of spider

Dunstanoides angustiae is a species of Desidae that is endemic to New Zealand.

== Taxonomy ==
This species was described as Ixeuticus angustiae by Brian John Marples in 1959 from a female specimen. It was most recently revised in 1973. The holotype is stored in Otago Museum.

== Description ==
The female is recorded at 3.6mm in length. The cephalothorax is coloured yellow brown and has dark shading. The legs are yellowish and has brown bands. The abdomen is grey and has a pale chevron pattern dorsally.

== Distribution ==
This species is only known from Arthurs Pass, New Zealand.

== Conservation status ==
Under the New Zealand Threat Classification System, this species is listed as "Data Deficient" with the qualifier of "Data Poor: Size", "Data Poor: Trend" and "One Location".
