= Paramamoea incertoides =

Conservation status
- Not Threatened (NZ TCS)

Scientific classification
- Kingdom: Animalia
- Phylum: Arthropoda
- Subphylum: Chelicerata
- Class: Arachnida
- Order: Araneae
- Infraorder: Araneomorphae
- Family: Desidae
- Genus: Paramamoea
- Species: P. incertoides

Binomial name
- Paramamoea incertoides Forster & Wilton, 1973

Species of spider

Paramamoea incertoides is a species of spider in the family Desidae that is endemic to New Zealand.

== Taxonomy ==
This species was described by Ray Forster and Cecil Wilton in 1973 from female and male specimens. The holotype is stored in Otago Museum.

== Description ==
The female is recorded at 4.75mm in length whereas the male is 4.90mm.

== Distribution ==
This species is known from scattered localities throughout the North Island of New Zealand.

== Conservation status ==
Under the New Zealand Threat Classification System, this species is listed as "Not Threatened".
