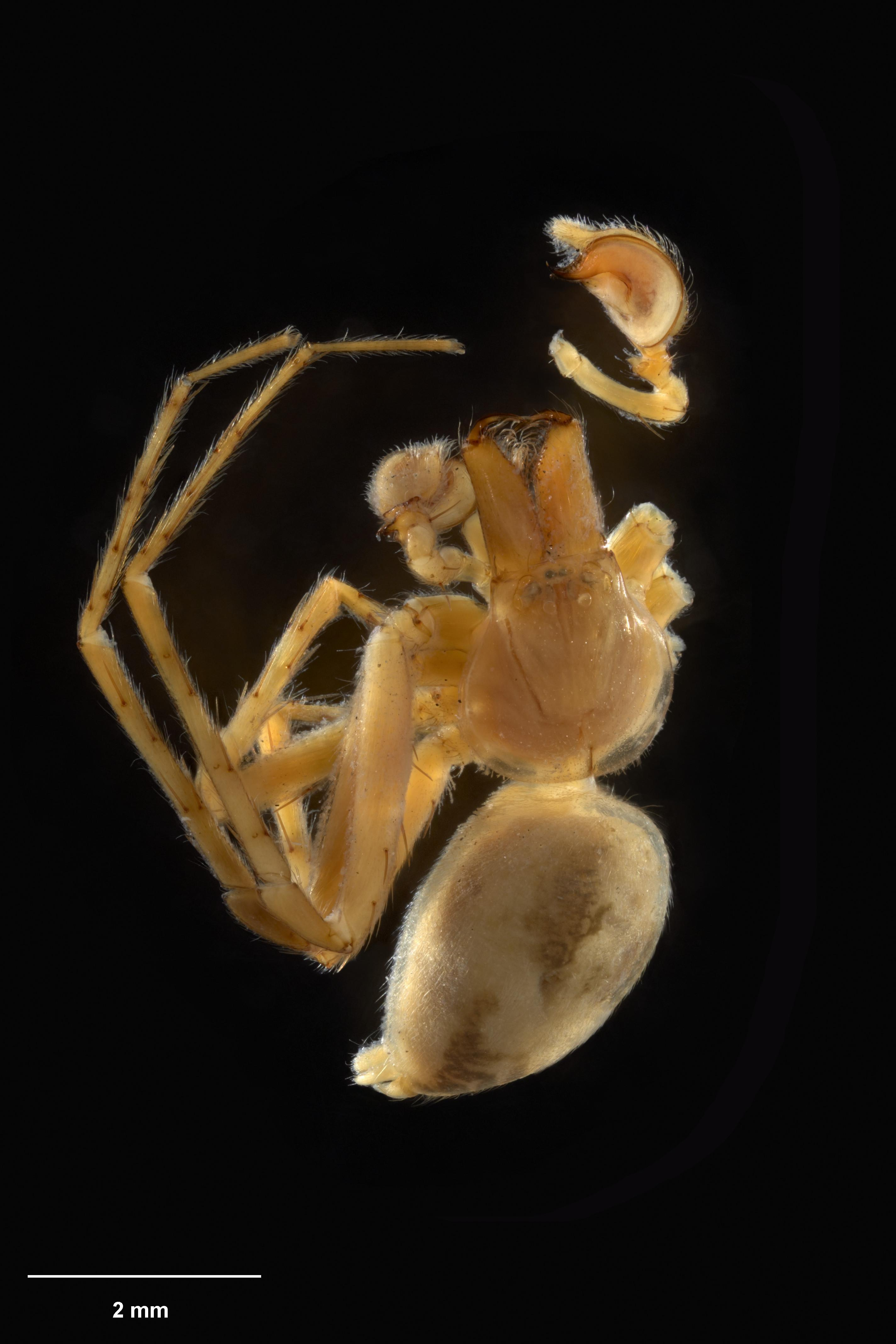

Conservation status
- Not Threatened (NZ TCS)

Scientific classification
- Kingdom: Animalia
- Phylum: Arthropoda
- Subphylum: Chelicerata
- Class: Arachnida
- Order: Araneae
- Infraorder: Araneomorphae
- Family: Desidae
- Genus: Goyenia
- Species: G. gratiosa

Binomial name
- Goyenia gratiosa Forster, 1970

= Goyenia gratiosa =

Species of spider

Goyenia gratiosa is a species of Desidae spider that is endemic to New Zealand.

== Taxonomy ==
This species was described in 1970 by Ray Forster from male and female specimens. The holotype is stored in Te Papa Museum under registration number AS.000033.

== Description ==
The male is recorded at 5.44mm in length whereas the female is 5.61mm.

== Distribution ==
This species is only known from Nelson, New Zealand.

== Conservation status ==
Under the New Zealand Threat Classification System, this species is listed as "Not Threatened".
