= Goyenia ornata =

Conservation status
- Data Deficit (NZ TCS)

Scientific classification
- Kingdom: Animalia
- Phylum: Arthropoda
- Subphylum: Chelicerata
- Class: Arachnida
- Order: Araneae
- Infraorder: Araneomorphae
- Family: Desidae
- Genus: Goyenia
- Species: G. ornata

Binomial name
- Goyenia ornata Forster, 1970

Species of spider

Goyenia ornata is a species of Desidae spider that is endemic to New Zealand.

== Taxonomy ==
This species was described in 1970 by Ray Forster from female and male specimens. The holotype is stored in Otago Museum.

== Description ==
The female is recorded at 5.26mm in length whereas the male is 4.93mm. The carapace is coloured pale cream. The legs are pale cream but darker distally. The abdomen is creamy with dark patches.

== Distribution ==
This species is only known from Mount Taranaki in New Zealand.

== Conservation status ==
Under the New Zealand Threat Classification System, this species is listed as "Data Deficient" with the qualifiers of "Data Poor: Size", "Data Poor: Trend" and "One Location".
