= Paramamoea aquilonalis =

Conservation status
- Data Deficit (NZ TCS)

Scientific classification
- Kingdom: Animalia
- Phylum: Arthropoda
- Subphylum: Chelicerata
- Class: Arachnida
- Order: Araneae
- Infraorder: Araneomorphae
- Family: Desidae
- Genus: Paramamoea
- Species: P. aquilonalis

Binomial name
- Paramamoea aquilonalis Forster & Wilton, 1973

Species of spider

Paramamoea aquilonalis is a species of spider in the family Desidae that is endemic to New Zealand.

== Taxonomy ==
This species was described by Ray Forster and Cecil Wilton in 1973 from female specimens. The holotype is stored in Auckland War Memorial Museum under registration number AMNZ5064.

== Description ==
The female is recorded at 5.1mm in length.

== Distribution ==
This species is only known from Northland, New Zealand.

== Conservation status ==
Under the New Zealand Threat Classification System, this species is listed as "Data Deficient" with the qualifiers of "Data Poor: Size" and "Data Poor: Trend".
