= Baiami glenelgi =

Scientific classification
- Kingdom: Animalia
- Phylum: Arthropoda
- Subphylum: Chelicerata
- Class: Arachnida
- Order: Araneae
- Infraorder: Araneomorphae
- Family: Desidae
- Genus: Baiami
- Species: B. glenelgi

Binomial name
- Baiami glenelgi Gray, 1981

Species of spider

Baiami glenelgi is a species of araneomorph spiders in the family of Desidae. It was first described in 1981 by Gray. The species was described from male and female specimens that were found by the Glenelg River, near Dartmoor, Victoria, whence the species epithet, glenelgi.

This species is endemic to Victoria.
