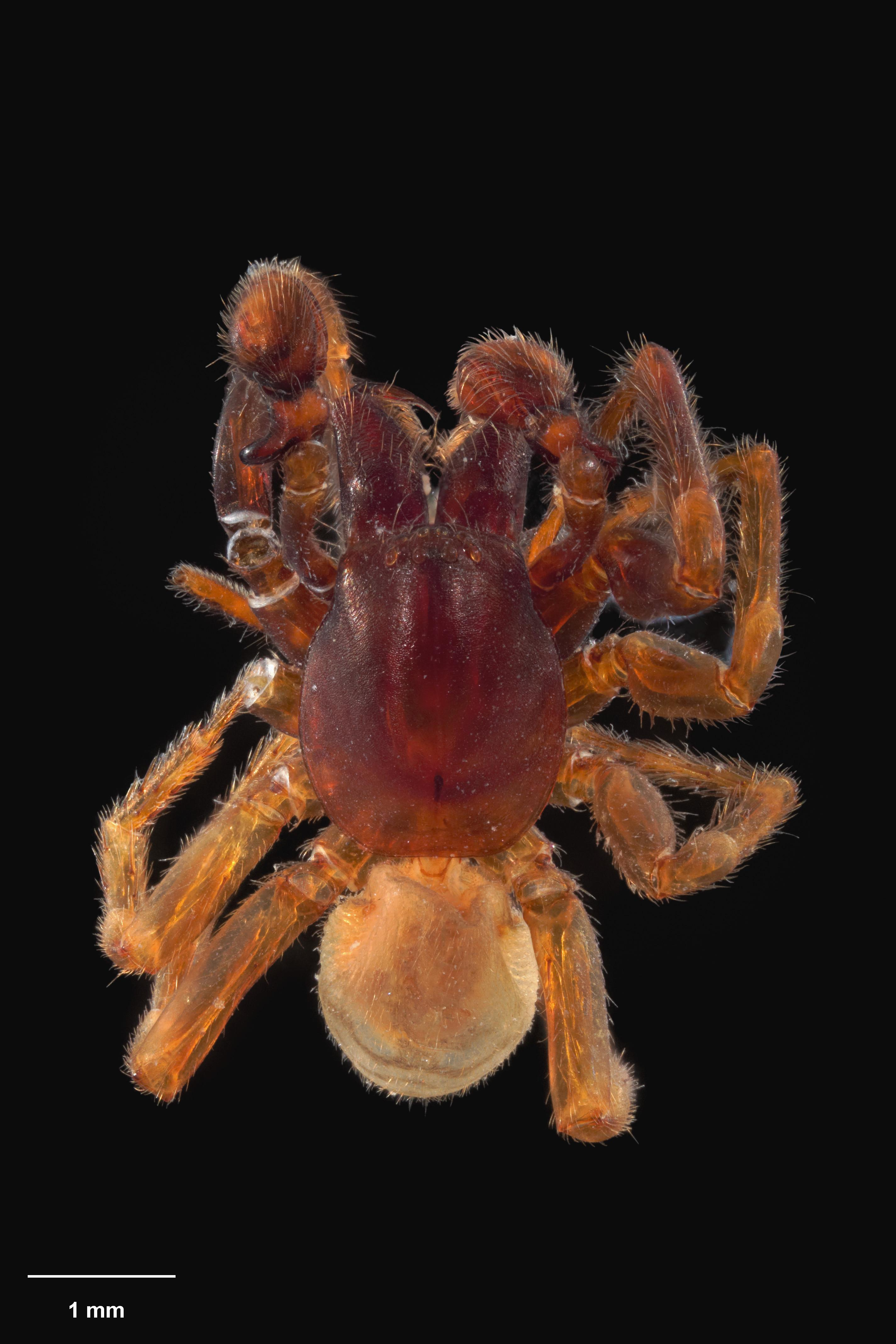

Conservation status
- Not Threatened (NZ TCS)

Scientific classification
- Kingdom: Animalia
- Phylum: Arthropoda
- Subphylum: Chelicerata
- Class: Arachnida
- Order: Araneae
- Infraorder: Araneomorphae
- Family: Desidae
- Genus: Paramamoea
- Species: P. incerta

Binomial name
- Paramamoea incerta Forster & Wilton, 1973

= Paramamoea incerta =

Species of spider

Paramamoea incerta is a species of spider in the family Desidae that is endemic to New Zealand.

== Taxonomy ==
This species was described by Ray Forster and Cecil Wilton in 1973 from male and female specimens. The holotype is stored in Te Papa Museum under registration number AS.000049.

== Description ==
The male is recorded at 4.76mm in length whereas the female is 5.27mm. The carapace is coloured deep reddish brown. The legs are orange brown. The abdomen is creamy with faint markings dorsally.

== Distribution ==
This species is only known from scattered localities in the North Island of New Zealand.

== Conservation status ==
Under the New Zealand Threat Classification System, this species is listed as "Not Threatened".
