= Amphinecta decemmaculata =

Conservation status
- Not Threatened (NZ TCS)

Scientific classification
- Kingdom: Animalia
- Phylum: Arthropoda
- Subphylum: Chelicerata
- Class: Arachnida
- Order: Araneae
- Infraorder: Araneomorphae
- Family: Desidae
- Genus: Amphinecta
- Species: A. decemmaculata

Binomial name
- Amphinecta decemmaculata (Simon, 1898)

Species of spider

Amphinecta decemmaculata is a species of Desidae that is endemic to New Zealand.

== Taxonomy ==
This species was described by Eugène Simon in 1898. It was most recently revised in 1973. The holotype is stored in the National Museum of Natural History, France.

== Description ==
The male is recorded at 8.60mm in length whereas the female is 11.47mm. The carapace is coloured dark reddish brown. The legs are paler reddish brown. The abdomen is shaded grey and has pale patches dorsally.

== Distribution ==
This species is only known from Wellington, New Zealand.

== Conservation status ==
Under the New Zealand Threat Classification System, this species is listed as "Not Threatened".
