= Baiami =

Scientific classification
- Kingdom: Animalia
- Phylum: Arthropoda
- Subphylum: Chelicerata
- Class: Arachnida
- Order: Araneae
- Infraorder: Araneomorphae
- Family: Desidae
- Genus: Baiami; Lehtinen, 1967

Type species
- B. volucripes (Simon, 1908)

Species
- 9, see text

Genus of spiders

Baiami is a genus of Australian intertidal spiders that was first described by Pekka T. Lehtinen in 1967. Originally placed with the Stiphidiidae, it was transferred to the Desidae after the results of a 2019 genetic analysis.

== Species ==
As of September 2019 it contains nine species, found in South Australia, Victoria, and Western Australia:

- Baiami brockmani Gray, 1981 – Australia (Western Australia)
- Baiami glenelgi Gray, 1981 – Australia (Victoria)
- Baiami loftyensis Gray, 1981 – Australia (South Australia)
- Baiami montana Gray, 1981 – Australia (Western Australia)
- Baiami stirlingi Gray, 1981 – Australia (Western Australia)
- Baiami storeniformis (Simon, 1908) – Australia (Western Australia)
- Baiami tegenarioides (Simon, 1908) – Australia (Western Australia)
- Baiami torbayensis Gray, 1981 – Australia (Western Australia)
- Baiami volucripes (Simon, 1908) (type) – Australia (Western Australia)

B. longipes and B. magnus were transferred to Canala, and B. mullamullangensis was transferred to Tartarus.
