= Paracedicus =

Scientific classification
- Domain: Eukaryota
- Kingdom: Animalia
- Phylum: Arthropoda
- Subphylum: Chelicerata
- Class: Arachnida
- Order: Araneae
- Infraorder: Araneomorphae
- Family: Desidae
- Genus: Paracedicus; Fet, 1993

Type species
- P. ephthalitus (Fet, 1993)

Species
- 7, see text

Genus of spiders

Paracedicus is a genus of Asian araneomorph spiders in the family Desidae first described by Victor R. Fet in 1993. First placed as a subgenus of Cedicus, it was elevated to genus status in 2003.

== Species ==
As of November 2024 it contains eight species:

- Paracedicus baram Levy, 2007 – Israel
- Paracedicus darvishi Mirshamsi, 2018 – Iran
- Paracedicus ephthalitus (Fet, 1993) (type) – Turkmenistan
- Paracedicus feti Marusik & Guseinov, 2003 – Azerbaijan
- Paracedicus gennadii (Fet, 1993) – Iran, Turkmenistan
- Paracedicus geshur Levy, 2007 – Israel
- Paracedicus kasatkini Zamani & Marusik, 2017 – Iran
- Paracedicus turcicus Gündüz, 2023 – Turkey
