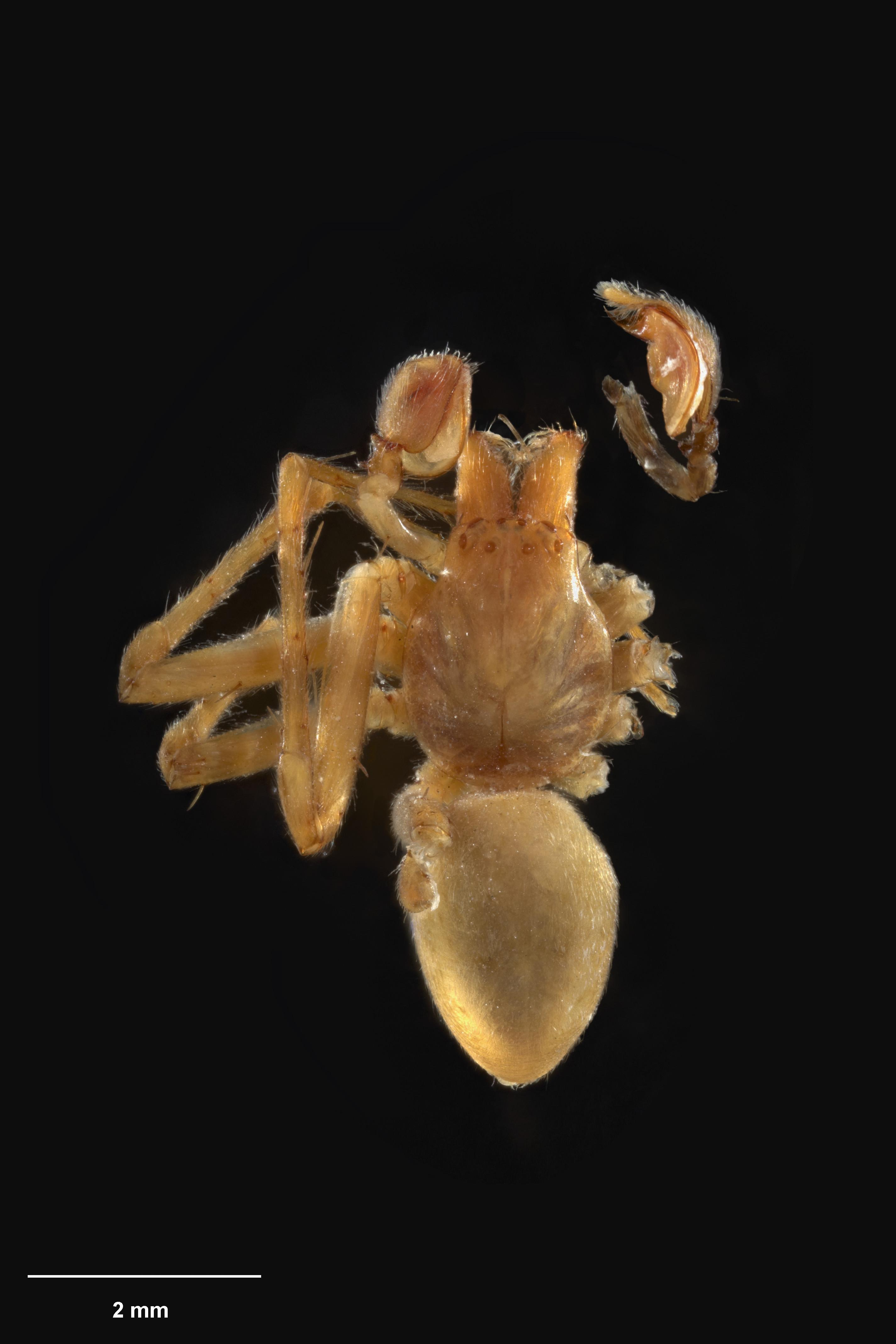

Conservation status
- Data Deficit (NZ TCS)

Scientific classification
- Kingdom: Animalia
- Phylum: Arthropoda
- Subphylum: Chelicerata
- Class: Arachnida
- Order: Araneae
- Infraorder: Araneomorphae
- Family: Desidae
- Genus: Goyenia
- Species: G. scitula

Binomial name
- Goyenia scitula Forster, 1970

= Goyenia scitula =

Species of spider

Goyenia scitula is a species of Desidae spider that is endemic to New Zealand.

== Taxonomy ==
This species was described in 1970 by Ray Forster from a male specimen. The holotype is stored in Te Papa Museum under registration number AS.000105.

== Description ==
The male is recorded at 5.10mm in length. The cephalothorax and legs are coloured pale yellow. The abdomen is creamy with black patches dorsally.

== Distribution ==
This species is only known from Wellington, New Zealand.

== Conservation status ==
Under the New Zealand Threat Classification System, this species is listed as "Data Deficient" with the qualifiers of "Data Poor: Size", "Data Poor: Trend" and "One Location".
