= Paramamoea pandora =

Conservation status
- Relict (NZ TCS)

Scientific classification
- Kingdom: Animalia
- Phylum: Arthropoda
- Subphylum: Chelicerata
- Class: Arachnida
- Order: Araneae
- Infraorder: Araneomorphae
- Family: Desidae
- Genus: Paramamoea
- Species: P. pandora

Binomial name
- Paramamoea pandora Forster & Wilton, 1973

Species of spider

Paramamoea pandora is a species of spider in the family Desidae that is endemic to New Zealand.

== Taxonomy ==
This species was described by Ray Forster and Cecil Wilton in 1973 from female and male specimens. The holotype is stored in Auckland War Memorial Museum under registration number AMNZ5076.

== Description ==
The female is recorded at 4.90mm in length whereas the male is 4.60mm.

== Distribution ==
This species is only known from Northland, New Zealand.

== Conservation status ==
Under the New Zealand Threat Classification System, this species is listed as "Relict" with the qualifier of "Range Restricted".
