= Makora calypso =

Conservation status
- Not Threatened (NZ TCS)

Scientific classification
- Domain: Eukaryota
- Kingdom: Animalia
- Phylum: Arthropoda
- Subphylum: Chelicerata
- Class: Arachnida
- Order: Araneae
- Infraorder: Araneomorphae
- Family: Desidae
- Genus: Makora
- Species: M. calypso

Binomial name
- Makora calypso (Marples, 1959)

Synonyms
- Ixeuticus calypso

Species of spider

Makora calypso is a species of Desidae that is endemic to New Zealand.

== Taxonomy ==
This species was described as Ixeuticus calypso by Brian John Marples from female and male specimens. It was revised in 1973. The holotype is stored in Otago Museum.

== Description ==
The female is recorded at 4.80mm in length whereas the male is 4.66mm. The cephalothorax and legs are coloured reddish brown. The abdomen is grey.

== Distribution ==
This species is only known from Otago, New Zealand.

== Conservation status ==
Under the New Zealand Threat Classification System, this species is listed as "Not Threatened".
