= Baiami brockmani =

Scientific classification
- Kingdom: Animalia
- Phylum: Arthropoda
- Subphylum: Chelicerata
- Class: Arachnida
- Order: Araneae
- Infraorder: Araneomorphae
- Family: Desidae
- Genus: Baiami
- Species: B. brockmani

Binomial name
- Baiami brockmani Gray, 1981

Species of spider

Baiami brockmani is a species of araneomorph spiders in the family Desidae first described in 1981 by Gray.

== Distribution ==
This species is endemic to South West Western Australia.

== Description ==
The body of the males measures to 3.05–4.60 mm (0.120–0.181 in) long and 2.37–3.42 mm (0.093–0.135 in) wide. Its abdomen is 2.00–4.60 mm (0.079–0.181 in) long. The body of the female measures to 3.80–5.75 mm (0.150–0.226 in) long and to 2.59–3.85 mm (0.102–0.152 in) wide. Its abdomen is 3.60–7.00 mm (0.142–0.276 in) long.

== Etymology ==
The name of the species, composed of brockman and the Latin suffix -ensis, "living in", is in reference to the place of its discovery, Brockman National Park.
