= Paramamoea insulana =

Conservation status
- Naturally Uncommon (NZ TCS)

Scientific classification
- Kingdom: Animalia
- Phylum: Arthropoda
- Subphylum: Chelicerata
- Class: Arachnida
- Order: Araneae
- Infraorder: Araneomorphae
- Family: Desidae
- Genus: Paramamoea
- Species: P. insulana

Binomial name
- Paramamoea insulana Forster & Wilton, 1973

Species of spider

Paramamoea insulana is a species of spider in the family Desidae that is endemic to New Zealand.

== Taxonomy ==
This species was described by Ray Forster and Cecil Wilton in 1973 from female and male specimens. The holotype is stored in the New Zealand Arthropod Collection under registration number NZAC03014950.

== Description ==
The female is recorded at 7.10mm in length whereas the male is 7.25mm.

== Distribution ==
This species is only known from Three King Islands, New Zealand.

== Conservation status ==
Under the New Zealand Threat Classification System, this species is listed as "Naturally Uncommon" with the qualifiers of "Island Endemic" and "Range Restricted".
