= Dunstanoides hinawa =

Conservation status
- Not Threatened (NZ TCS)

Scientific classification
- Kingdom: Animalia
- Phylum: Arthropoda
- Subphylum: Chelicerata
- Class: Arachnida
- Order: Araneae
- Infraorder: Araneomorphae
- Family: Desidae
- Genus: Dunstanoides
- Species: D. hinawa

Binomial name
- Dunstanoides hinawa (Forster & Wilton, 1973)

Species of spider

Dunstanoides hinawa is a species of Desidae that is endemic to New Zealand.

== Taxonomy ==
This species was described by Ray Forster and Cecil Wilton in 1973 from female specimens. The holotype is stored in Otago Museum.

== Description ==
The female is recorded at 3.7mm in length. The carapace and legs are coloured pale orange brown. The abdomen is brownish grey.

== Distribution ==
This species is only known from Stewart Island and the southern end of New Zealand's South Island.

== Conservation status ==
Under the New Zealand Threat Classification System, this species is listed as "Not Threatened" with the qualifier of "Data Poor: Size" and "Data Poor: Trend".
