= Makora detrita =

Conservation status
- Data Deficit (NZ TCS)

Scientific classification
- Kingdom: Animalia
- Phylum: Arthropoda
- Subphylum: Chelicerata
- Class: Arachnida
- Order: Araneae
- Infraorder: Araneomorphae
- Family: Desidae
- Genus: Makora
- Species: M. detrita

Binomial name
- Makora detrita Forster & Wilton, 1973

Species of spider

Makora detrita is a species of Desidae that is endemic to New Zealand.

== Taxonomy ==
This species was described by Ray Forster and Cecil Wilton in 1973 from female specimens. The holotype is stored in Otago Museum.

== Description ==
The female is recorded at 4.70mm in length. The carapace is coloured pale orange brown. The legs are pale yellowish orange. The abdomen has a poorly defined pale cross dorsally.

== Distribution ==
This species is only known from Banks Peninsula, New Zealand.

== Conservation status ==
Under the New Zealand Threat Classification System, this species is listed as "Data Deficient" with the qualifiers of "Data Poor: Size", "Data Poor: Trend" and "One Location".
