= Cedicoides =

Scientific classification
- Domain: Eukaryota
- Kingdom: Animalia
- Phylum: Arthropoda
- Subphylum: Chelicerata
- Class: Arachnida
- Order: Araneae
- Infraorder: Araneomorphae
- Family: Desidae
- Genus: Cedicoides; Charitonov, 1946

Species
- Cedicoides maerens (Simon, 1889); Cedicoides parthus (Fet, 1993); Cedicoides pavlovskyi (Spassky, 1941); Cedicoides simoni (Charitonov, 1946)

Genus of spiders

Cedicoides is a genus of spiders in the family Desidae made up of four species. It is characterized by well developed tegulum on the bulb of the male pedipalp. When it was published by Charitonov in 1946, it acted as a subgenus to Cedicus. Later, it was argued that the differences between spiders of Cedicoides and those of other subgenera - notably the presence of a terminal apophysis and the shape of the male pedipalp - were great enough to warrant a new genus. In 2003, it was upgraded from subgenus to genus status by Marusik & Guseinov. Spiders of this genus are rare, and are often missing from spider collections taken from these regions during any time other than their mating season.

== Species ==
As of November 2024, the World Spider Catalog accepted four species in the genus.

=== C. maerens ===
Cedicoides maerens is found in Turkmenistan in the desert foothills of Kopetdagh. It was first described in 1889 by Victor R. Fet from a single female specimen found by Eugène Simon during G.I. Radde's expedition to what was then the Transcaspian Region. It was initially placed in the genus Cedicus. A male was found in the foothills of Nebit Dagh in 1982, but it was not positively identified until 1993.

=== C. parthus ===
Cedicoides parthus was first described by Fet in 1993 from a specimen found in Turkmenistan. It is distinguished from similar species by the shape of the tibial palpal apophysis in males, parts of the epigyne and vulva in females, and the abdominal pattern in both. It is about eight millimeters long. The carapace is about 3.75 millimeters long and brown. Legs are brown and bear a pattern of light and dark stripes on the femur.

=== C. pavlovskyi ===
Cedicoides pavlovskyi lives in the deserts and foothills of Tajikistan. It was first described by Spassky in 1941.

=== C. simoni ===
Cedicoides simoni lives in the deserts and foothills of Uzbekistan. It was first described by Charitonov in 1946 when it was used as the type species for the subgenus Cedicoides.
