= Taurongia =

Scientific classification
- Domain: Eukaryota
- Kingdom: Animalia
- Phylum: Arthropoda
- Subphylum: Chelicerata
- Class: Arachnida
- Order: Araneae
- Infraorder: Araneomorphae
- Family: Desidae
- Genus: Taurongia; Hogg, 1901

Type species
- T. punctata (Hogg, 1900)

Species
- T. ambigua Gray, 2005 – Australia (Victoria); T. punctata (Hogg, 1900) – Australia (Victoria)

Genus of spiders

Taurongia is a genus of Australian intertidal spiders that was first described by Henry Roughton Hogg in 1901. As of May 2019 it consists of only two species: T. ambigua and T. punctata. Originally placed with the Amaurobiidae, it was moved to the intertidal spiders in 1967.
