= Cunnawarra =

Scientific classification
- Kingdom: Animalia
- Phylum: Arthropoda
- Subphylum: Chelicerata
- Class: Arachnida
- Order: Araneae
- Infraorder: Araneomorphae
- Family: Desidae
- Genus: Cunnawarra; Davies, 1998

Type species
- C. grayi Davies, 1998

Species
- C. cassisi Davies, 1998 – Australia (New South Wales); C. grayi Davies, 1998 – Australia (New South Wales)

Genus of spiders

Cunnawarra is a genus of Australian intertidal spiders first described by V. T. Davies in 1998. As of April 2019 it contains only two species.

== Distribution ==
This genus is endemic to New South Wales, Australia.
