= Austmusia =

Scientific classification
- Domain: Eukaryota
- Kingdom: Animalia
- Phylum: Arthropoda
- Subphylum: Chelicerata
- Class: Arachnida
- Order: Araneae
- Infraorder: Araneomorphae
- Family: Desidae
- Genus: Austmusia; Gray, 1983

Type species
- A. wilsoni Gray, 1983

Species
- A. kioloa Gray, 1983 – Australia (New South Wales); A. lindi Gray, 1983 – Australia (Victoria); A. wilsoni Gray, 1983 – Australia (New South Wales)

Genus of spiders

Austmusia is a genus of Australian intertidal spiders first described by Michael R. Gray in 1983. As of April 2019 it contains only three species.
