= Epimecinus =

Scientific classification
- Kingdom: Animalia
- Phylum: Arthropoda
- Subphylum: Chelicerata
- Class: Arachnida
- Order: Araneae
- Infraorder: Araneomorphae
- Family: Desidae
- Genus: Epimecinus; Simon, 1908

Type species
- E. nexibilis (Simon, 1906)

Species
- 4, see text

Genus of spiders

Epimecinus is a genus of South Pacific intertidal spiders that was first described by Eugène Simon in 1908.

== Species ==
As of May 2019 it contains four species:

- Epimecinus alkirna Gray, 1973 – Australia (Western Australia)
- Epimecinus humilis Berland, 1924 – New Caledonia
- Epimecinus nexibilis (Simon, 1906) (type) – New Caledonia
- Epimecinus pullatus (Simon, 1906) – New Caledonia
