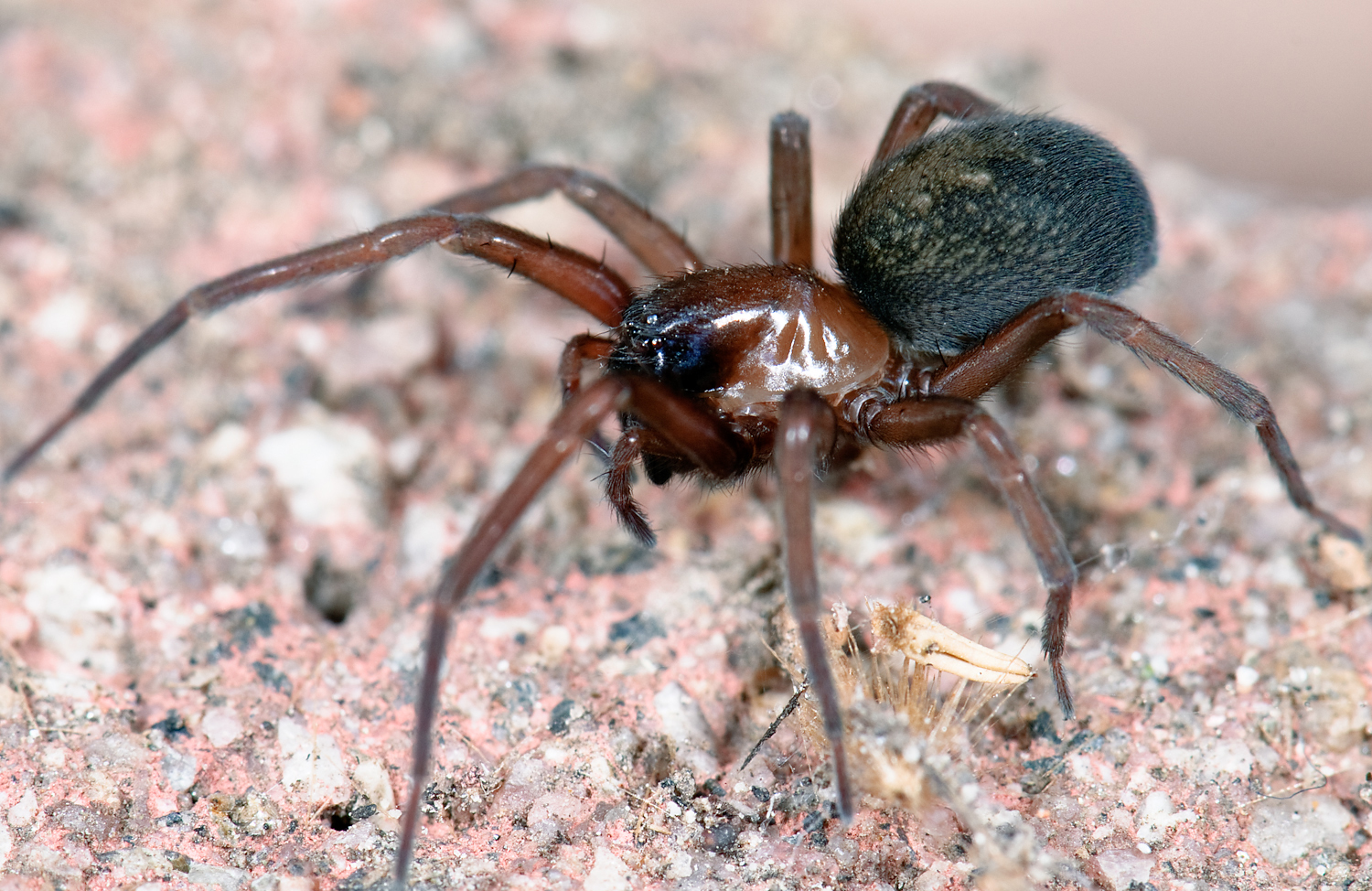
- Female Metaltella simoni

Scientific classification
- Domain: Eukaryota
- Kingdom: Animalia
- Phylum: Arthropoda
- Subphylum: Chelicerata
- Class: Arachnida
- Order: Araneae
- Infraorder: Araneomorphae
- Family: Desidae
- Genus: Metaltella; Mello-Leitão, 1931

Type species
- M. iheringi (Keyserling, 1891)

Species
- 6, see text

Synonyms
- Aebutinoides; Exlinea

= Metaltella =

Genus of spiders

Metaltella is a genus of South American intertidal spiders first described by Cândido Firmino de Mello-Leitão in 1931. One species, Metaltella simoni, has been introduced to North America.

== Species ==
As of April 2019 it contains six species:

- Metaltella arcoiris (Mello-Leitão, 1943) – Chile
- Metaltella iheringi (Keyserling, 1891) – Brazil, Argentina
- Metaltella imitans (Mello-Leitão, 1940) – Argentina
- Metaltella rorulenta (Nicolet, 1849) – Peru, Chile, Argentina
- Metaltella simoni (Keyserling, 1878) – Brazil, Uruguay, Argentina. Introduced to USA, Canada
- Metaltella tigrina (Mello-Leitão, 1943) – Argentina
