= Penaoola =

Scientific classification
- Domain: Eukaryota
- Kingdom: Animalia
- Phylum: Arthropoda
- Subphylum: Chelicerata
- Class: Arachnida
- Order: Araneae
- Infraorder: Araneomorphae
- Family: Desidae
- Genus: Penaoola; Davies, 1998

Type species
- P. algida Davies, 1998

Species
- P. algida Davies, 1998 – Australia (South Australia); P. madida Davies, 1998 – Australia (South Australia)

Genus of spiders

Penaoola is a genus of Australian intertidal spiders first described by V. T. Davies in 1998. As of April 2019 it contains only two species.
