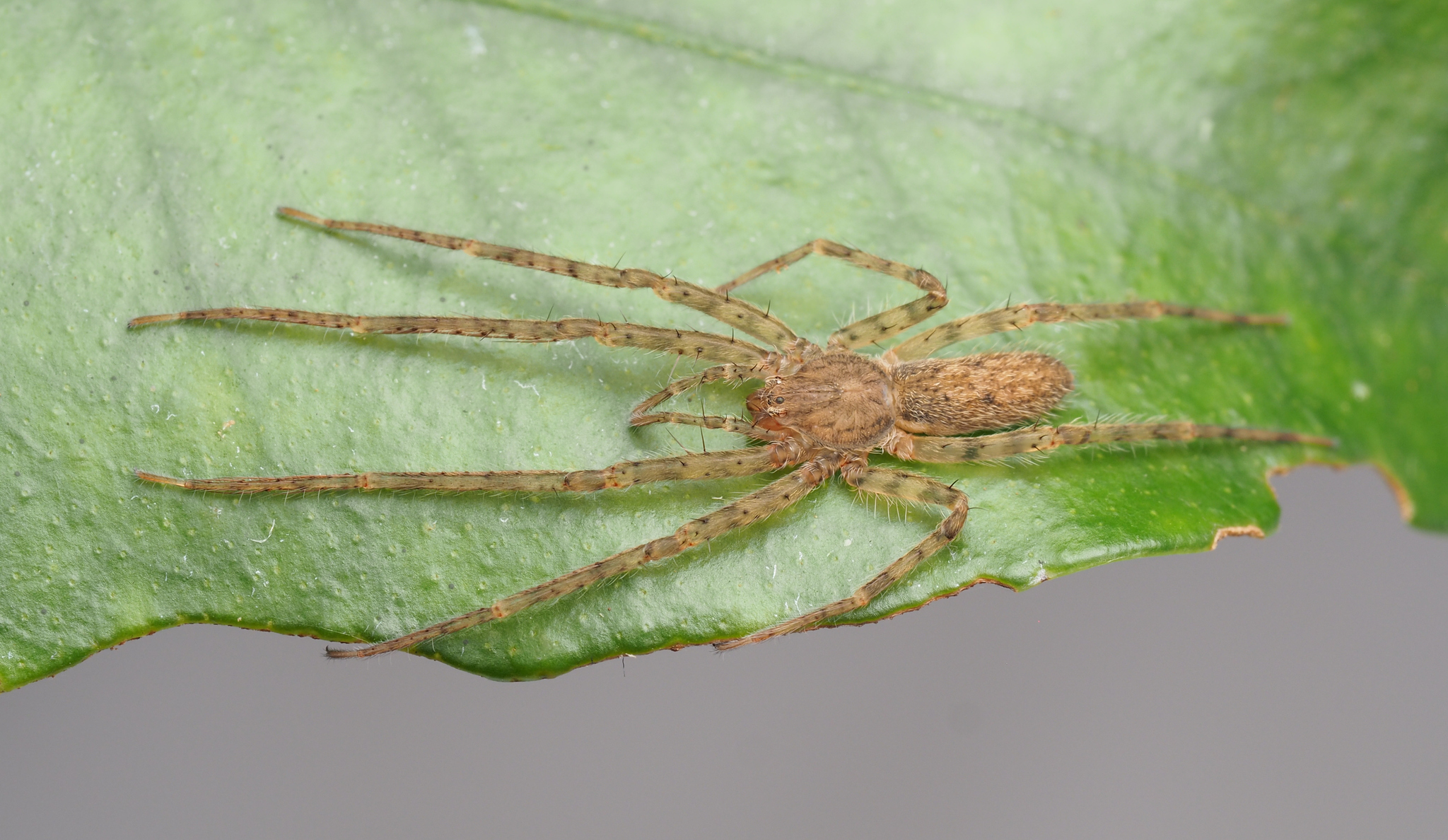
- Manjala plana

Scientific classification
- Kingdom: Animalia
- Phylum: Arthropoda
- Subphylum: Chelicerata
- Class: Arachnida
- Order: Araneae
- Infraorder: Araneomorphae
- Family: Desidae
- Genus: Manjala; Davies, 1990

Type species
- M. plana Davies, 1990

Species
- M. pallida Davies, 1990 – Australia (Queensland); M. plana Davies, 1990 – Australia (Queensland); M. spinosa Davies, 1990 – Australia (Queensland)

= Manjala =

Genus of spiders

Manjala is a genus of Australian intertidal spiders first described by V. T. Davies in 1990. As of April 2019 it contains only three species.
