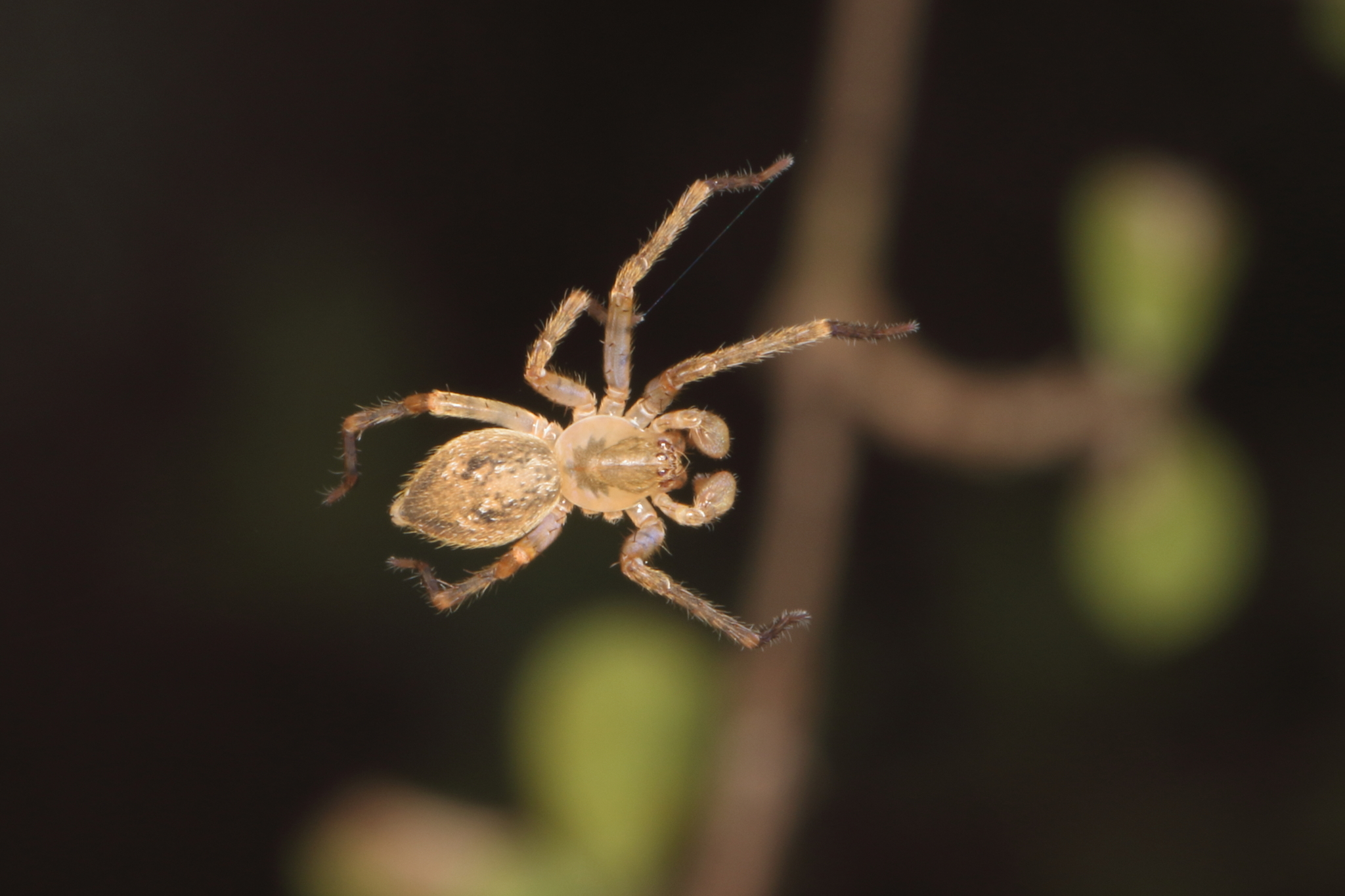
- Goyenia spp. seen in Arthur's Pass National Park

Scientific classification
- Domain: Eukaryota
- Kingdom: Animalia
- Phylum: Arthropoda
- Subphylum: Chelicerata
- Class: Arachnida
- Order: Araneae
- Infraorder: Araneomorphae
- Family: Desidae
- Genus: Goyenia; Forster, 1970

Type species
- G. electa Forster, 1970

Species
- 10, see text

= Goyenia =

Genus of spiders

Goyenia is a genus of South Pacific intertidal spiders that was first described by Raymond Robert Forster in 1970.

== Species ==
As of May 2019 it contains ten species, all found in New Zealand:

- Goyenia electa Forster, 1970 (type) – New Zealand
- Goyenia fresa Forster, 1970 – New Zealand
- Goyenia gratiosa Forster, 1970 – New Zealand
- Goyenia lucrosa Forster, 1970 – New Zealand
- Goyenia marplesi Forster, 1970 – New Zealand
- Goyenia multidentata Forster, 1970 – New Zealand
- Goyenia ornata Forster, 1970 – New Zealand
- Goyenia sana Forster, 1970 – New Zealand
- Goyenia scitula Forster, 1970 – New Zealand
- Goyenia sylvatica Forster, 1970 – New Zealand
