= Canala (spider) =

Scientific classification
- Domain: Eukaryota
- Kingdom: Animalia
- Phylum: Arthropoda
- Subphylum: Chelicerata
- Class: Arachnida
- Order: Araneae
- Infraorder: Araneomorphae
- Family: Desidae
- Genus: Canala; Gray, 1992

Type species
- C. magna (Berland, 1924)

Species
- C. longipes (Berland, 1924) – New Caledonia; C. magna (Berland, 1924) – New Caledonia; C. poya Gray, 1992 – New Caledonia

Genus of spiders

Canala is a genus of South Pacific intertidal spiders that was first described by Michael R. Gray in 1992. As of May 2019 it contains only three species, all found in New Caledonia: C. longipes, C. magna, and C. poya.
