= Dunstanoides =

Scientific classification
- Kingdom: Animalia
- Phylum: Arthropoda
- Subphylum: Chelicerata
- Class: Arachnida
- Order: Araneae
- Infraorder: Araneomorphae
- Family: Desidae
- Genus: Dunstanoides; Forster & Wilton, 1989

Type species
- D. hesperis (Forster & Wilton, 1973)

Species
- 9, see text

Genus of spiders

Dunstanoides is a genus of South Pacific intertidal spiders first described by Norman I. Platnick in 1989.

== Species ==
As of April 2019 it contains nine species, all found in New Zealand:

- Dunstanoides angustiae (Marples, 1959) – New Zealand
- Dunstanoides hesperis (Forster & Wilton, 1973) – New Zealand
- Dunstanoides hinawa (Forster & Wilton, 1973) – New Zealand
- Dunstanoides hova (Forster & Wilton, 1973) – New Zealand
- Dunstanoides kochi (Forster & Wilton, 1973) – New Zealand
- Dunstanoides mirus (Forster & Wilton, 1973) – New Zealand
- Dunstanoides montana (Forster & Wilton, 1973) – New Zealand
- Dunstanoides nuntia (Marples, 1959) – New Zealand
- Dunstanoides salmoni (Forster & Wilton, 1973) – New Zealand
