= Quemusia =

Scientific classification
- Domain: Eukaryota
- Kingdom: Animalia
- Phylum: Arthropoda
- Subphylum: Chelicerata
- Class: Arachnida
- Order: Araneae
- Infraorder: Araneomorphae
- Family: Desidae
- Genus: Quemusia; Davies, 1998

Type species
- Q. aquilonia Davies, 1998

Species
- 4, see text

Genus of spiders

Quemusia is a genus of Australian intertidal spiders first described by V. T. Davies in 1998.

== Species ==
As of April 2019 it contains four species:

- Quemusia aquilonia Davies, 1998 – Australia (Queensland)
- Quemusia austrina Davies, 1998 – Australia (Queensland)
- Quemusia cordillera Davies, 1998 – Australia (New South Wales)
- Quemusia raveni Davies, 1998 – Australia (Queensland)
