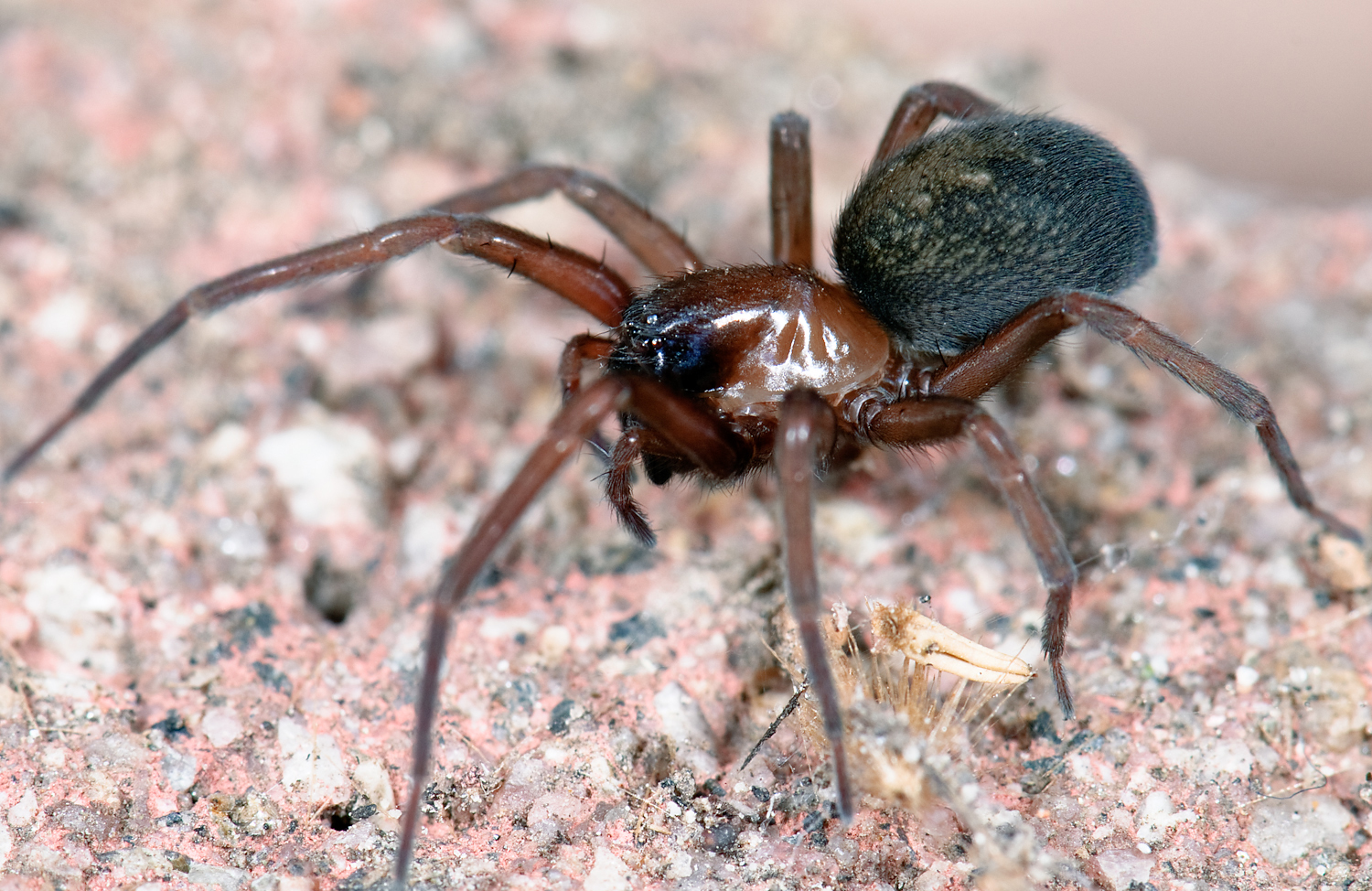
- Female

Scientific classification
- Domain: Eukaryota
- Kingdom: Animalia
- Phylum: Arthropoda
- Subphylum: Chelicerata
- Class: Arachnida
- Order: Araneae
- Infraorder: Araneomorphae
- Family: Desidae
- Genus: Metaltella
- Species: M. simoni

Binomial name
- Metaltella simoni (Keyserling, 1878)

= Metaltella simoni =

Species of spider

Metaltella simoni is a species of spider, native to South America (Brazil, Uruguay and Argentina), and introduced into the United States and Canada.

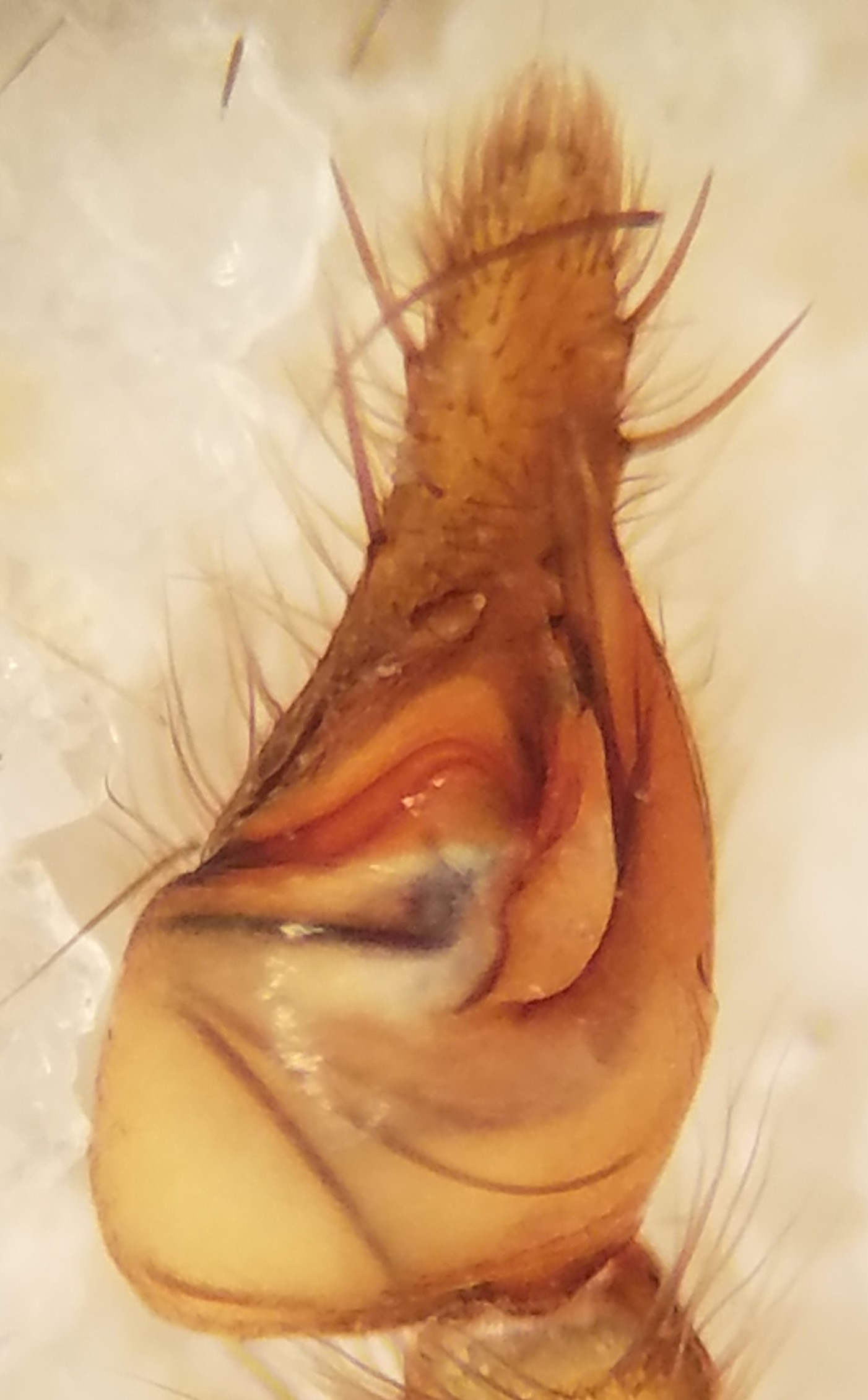
Left palp of male, ventral view

== Description ==
Females are about 8 to 9 mm long, males about 7 to 8.5 mm long. Both sexes are brown, with some darker parts, such as of the front of the carapace (the upper surface of the cephalothorax), the ends of the legs and the chelicerae. The abdomen (opisthosoma) is mottled grey or grey–black, with indistinct paler chevrons towards the rear. Males have an orange-yellow area towards the back of the carapace, darkening to brown at the front. The lateral eyes of both sexes are larger than the median eyes.

== Taxonomy ==
Metaltella simoni was first described as Amaurobius simoni by Eugen von Keyserling in 1878. It was transferred to the genus Metaltella by Pekka T. Lehtinen in 1967.

== Distribution and habitat ==
The species is native to South America (Brazil, Uruguay and Argentina). It was first collected in North America in Louisiana in 1944. In 1971, it was described as "common in Mississippi and parts of Louisiana" where it was found under logs at ground level. By 2008, it was described as "widespread in coastal southern California".
