= Tanganoides =

Scientific classification
- Domain: Eukaryota
- Kingdom: Animalia
- Phylum: Arthropoda
- Subphylum: Chelicerata
- Class: Arachnida
- Order: Araneae
- Infraorder: Araneomorphae
- Family: Desidae
- Genus: Tanganoides; Davies, 2005

Type species
- T. greeni (Davies, 2003)

Species
- 6, see text

Genus of spiders

Tanganoides is a genus of Australian intertidal spiders first described by V. T. Davies in 2005.

== Species ==
As of April 2019 it contains six species:

- Tanganoides acutus (Davies, 2003) – Australia (Tasmania)
- Tanganoides clarkei (Davies, 2003) – Australia (Tasmania)
- Tanganoides collinus (Davies, 2003) – Australia (Tasmania)
- Tanganoides greeni (Davies, 2003) – Australia (Tasmania)
- Tanganoides harveyi (Davies, 2003) – Australia (Victoria)
- Tanganoides mcpartlan (Davies, 2003) – Australia (Tasmania)
