= Lathyarcha =

Scientific classification
- Kingdom: Animalia
- Phylum: Arthropoda
- Subphylum: Chelicerata
- Class: Arachnida
- Order: Araneae
- Infraorder: Araneomorphae
- Family: Desidae
- Genus: Lathyarcha; Simon, 1908

Type species
- L. tetrica Simon, 1908

Species
- L. cinctipes (Simon, 1906) – Australia (Victoria); L. inornata (L. Koch, 1872) – Australia (Queensland, New South Wales); L. tetrica Simon, 1908 – Australia (Western Australia)

Genus of spiders

Lathyarcha is a genus of Australian intertidal spiders that was first described by Eugène Simon in 1908. As of May 2019 it contains only three species: L. cinctipes, L. inornata, and L. tetrica. Originally placed with the intertidal spiders, it was moved to the Matachiinae (subfamily of Amaurobiidae) in 1967.
