= Paramamoea =

Scientific classification
- Kingdom: Animalia
- Phylum: Arthropoda
- Subphylum: Chelicerata
- Class: Arachnida
- Order: Araneae
- Infraorder: Araneomorphae
- Family: Desidae
- Genus: Paramamoea; Forster & Wilton, 1973

Type species
- P. incerta Forster & Wilton, 1973

Species
- 10, see text

Genus of spiders

Paramamoea is a genus of South Pacific intertidal spiders, first described by Raymond Robert Forster & C. L. Wilton in 1973.

== Species ==
As of April 2019 it contains ten species, all found in New Zealand:

- Paramamoea aquilonalis Forster & Wilton, 1973 – New Zealand
- Paramamoea arawa Forster & Wilton, 1973 – New Zealand
- Paramamoea incerta Forster & Wilton, 1973 – New Zealand
- Paramamoea incertoides Forster & Wilton, 1973 – New Zealand
- Paramamoea insulana Forster & Wilton, 1973 – New Zealand
- Paramamoea pandora Forster & Wilton, 1973 – New Zealand
- Paramamoea paradisica Forster & Wilton, 1973 – New Zealand
- Paramamoea parva Forster & Wilton, 1973 – New Zealand
- Paramamoea urewera Forster & Wilton, 1973 – New Zealand
- Paramamoea waipoua Forster & Wilton, 1973 – New Zealand
