= Makora =

Scientific classification
- Kingdom: Animalia
- Phylum: Arthropoda
- Subphylum: Chelicerata
- Class: Arachnida
- Order: Araneae
- Infraorder: Araneomorphae
- Family: Desidae
- Genus: Makora; Forster & Wilton, 1973

Type species
- M. figurata Forster & Wilton, 1973

Species
- 5, see text

Genus of spiders

Makora is a genus of South Pacific intertidal spiders first described by Raymond Robert Forster & C. L. Wilton in 1973.

== Species ==
As of April 2019 it contains five species, all found in New Zealand:

- Makora calypso (Marples, 1959) – New Zealand
- Makora detrita Forster & Wilton, 1973 – New Zealand
- Makora diversa Forster & Wilton, 1973 – New Zealand
- Makora figurata Forster & Wilton, 1973 – New Zealand
- Makora mimica Forster & Wilton, 1973 – New Zealand
