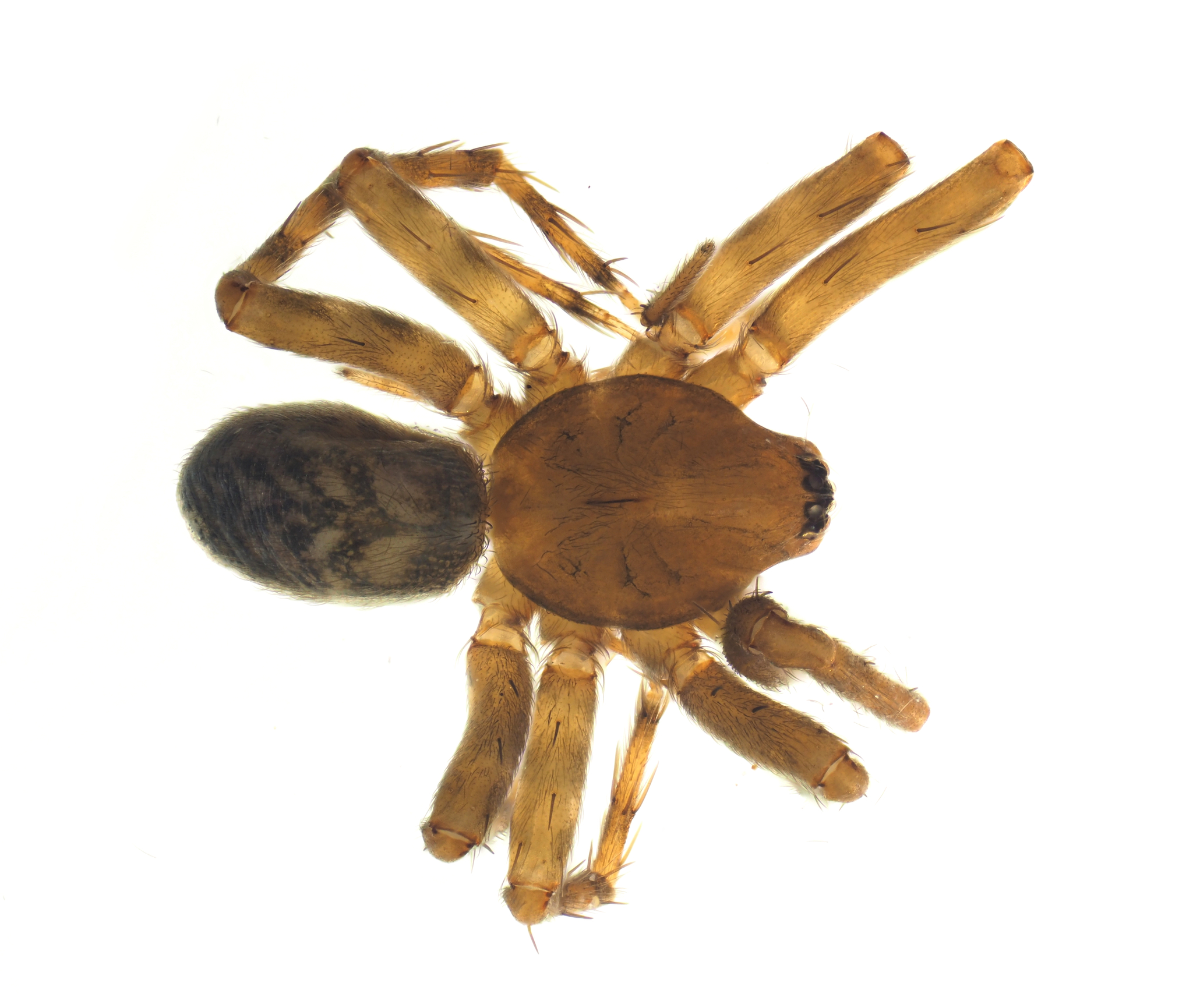

Scientific classification
- Domain: Eukaryota
- Kingdom: Animalia
- Phylum: Arthropoda
- Subphylum: Chelicerata
- Class: Arachnida
- Order: Araneae
- Infraorder: Araneomorphae
- Family: Desidae
- Genus: Colcarteria; Gray, 1992

Type species
- C. carrai Gray, 1992

Species
- C. carrai Gray, 1992 – Australia (New South Wales); C. kempseyi Gray, 1992 – Australia (New South Wales); C. yessabah Gray, 1992 – Australia (New South Wales)

= Colcarteria =

Genus of spiders

Colcarteria is a genus of Australian intertidal spiders that was first described by Michael R. Gray in 1992. As of May 2019 it contains only three species: C. carrai, C. kempseyi, and C. yessabah.
