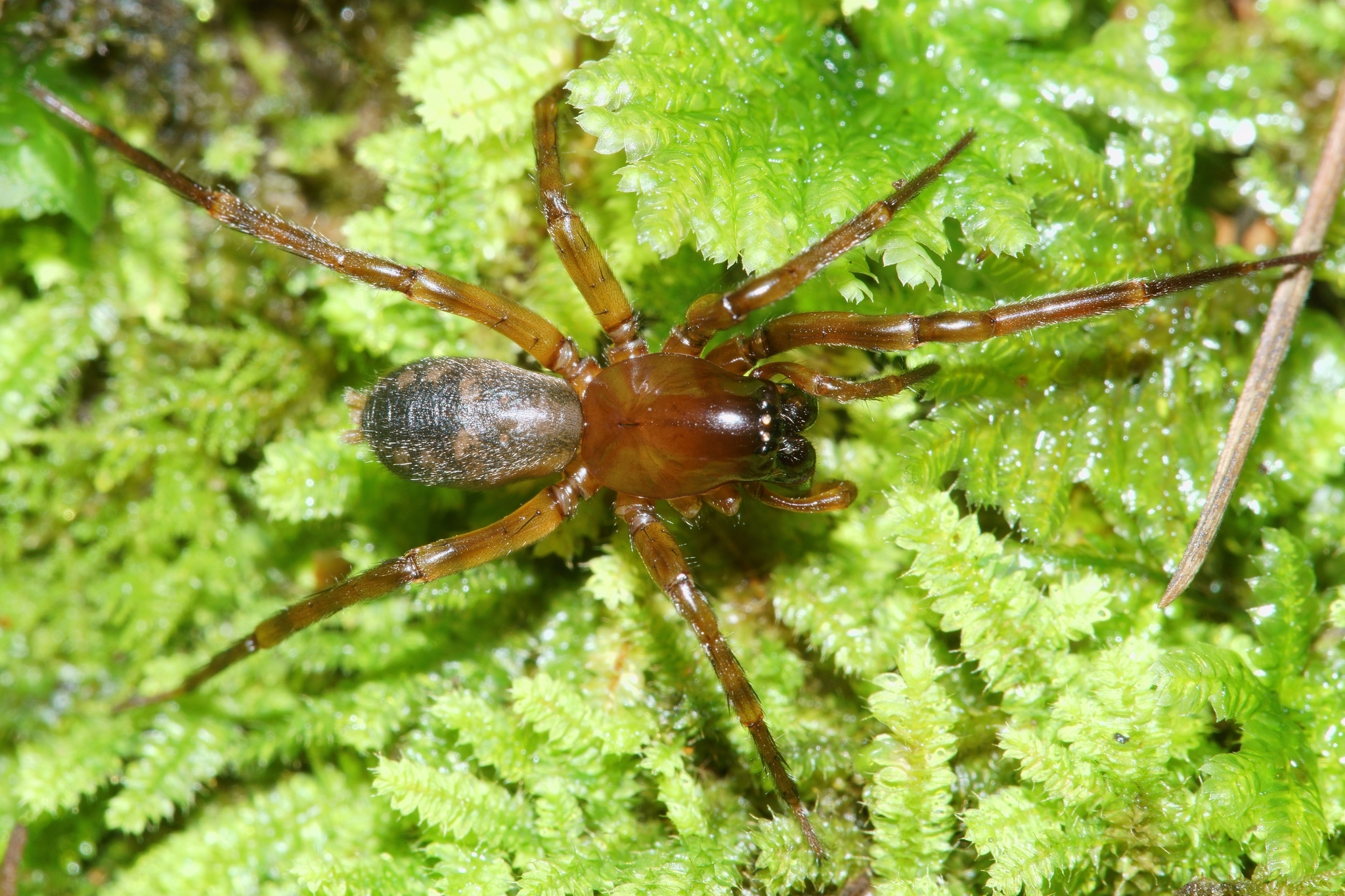
- Amphinecta pila

Scientific classification
- Kingdom: Animalia
- Phylum: Arthropoda
- Subphylum: Chelicerata
- Class: Arachnida
- Order: Araneae
- Infraorder: Araneomorphae
- Family: Desidae
- Genus: Amphinecta; Simon, 1898

Type species
- A. decemmaculata Simon, 1898

Species
- 11, see text

= Amphinecta =

Genus of spiders

Amphinecta is a genus of South Pacific intertidal spiders first described by Eugène Simon in 1898.

== Species ==
As of April 2019 it contains eleven species, all found in New Zealand:

- Amphinecta decemmaculata Simon, 1898 – New Zealand
- Amphinecta dejecta Forster & Wilton, 1973 – New Zealand
- Amphinecta luta Forster & Wilton, 1973 – New Zealand
- Amphinecta mara Forster & Wilton, 1973 – New Zealand
- Amphinecta milina Forster & Wilton, 1973 – New Zealand
- Amphinecta mula Forster & Wilton, 1973 – New Zealand
- Amphinecta pika Forster & Wilton, 1973 – New Zealand
- Amphinecta pila Forster & Wilton, 1973 – New Zealand
- Amphinecta puka Forster & Wilton, 1973 – New Zealand
- Amphinecta tama Forster & Wilton, 1973 – New Zealand
- Amphinecta tula Forster & Wilton, 1973 – New Zealand
