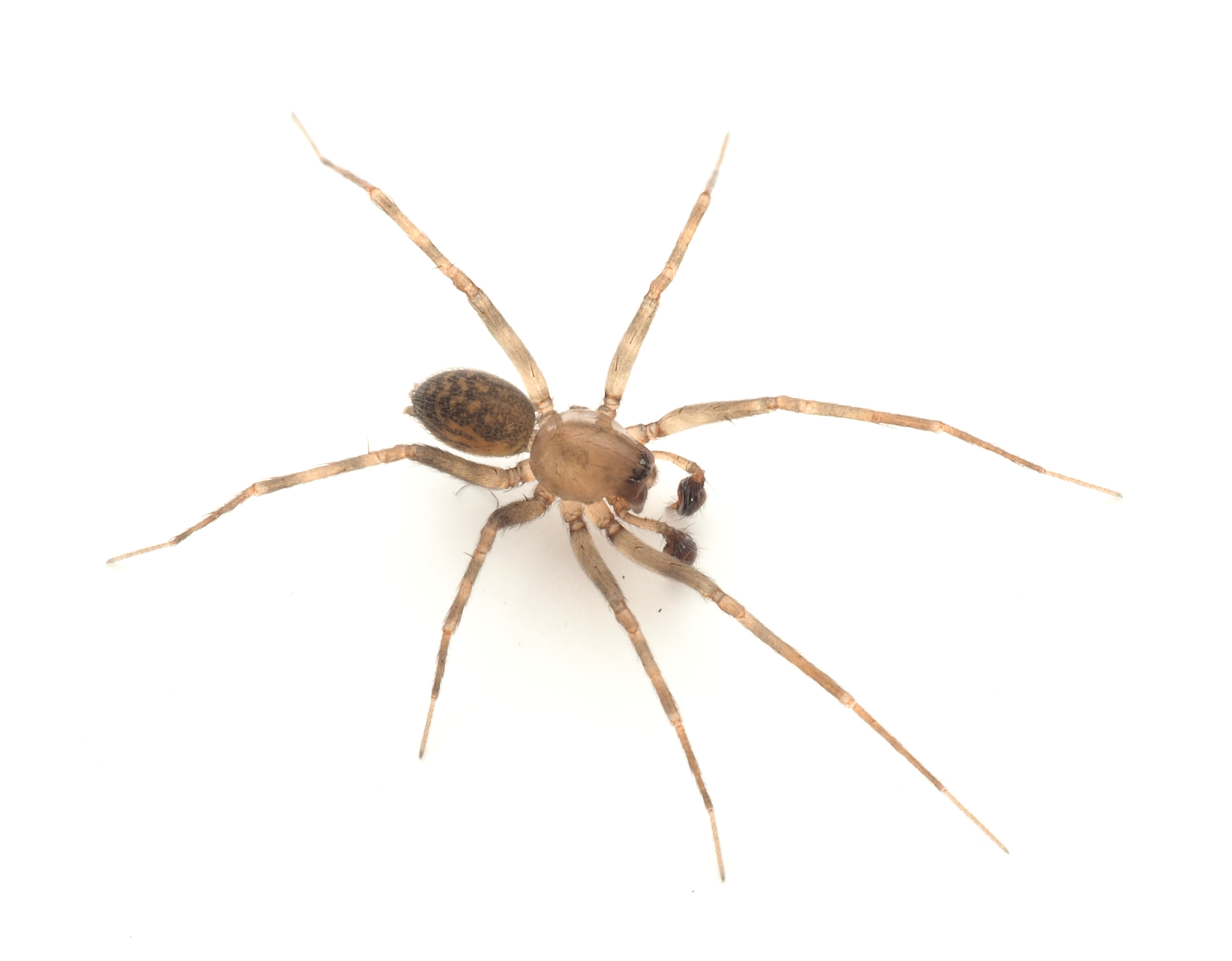
- Barahna yeppoon

Scientific classification
- Kingdom: Animalia
- Phylum: Arthropoda
- Subphylum: Chelicerata
- Class: Arachnida
- Order: Araneae
- Infraorder: Araneomorphae
- Family: Desidae
- Genus: Barahna; Davies, 2003

Type species
- B. booloumba Davies, 2003

Species
- 8, see text

= Barahna =

Genus of spiders

Barahna is a genus of Australian spiders in the family Desidae (intertidal spiders) that was first described by V. T. Davies in 2003. The name is derived from baran-barahn, the Bundjalung word for "spider". Originally placed with the Stiphidiidae, it was moved to the Desidae after the results of a 2017 genetic study.

== Species ==
As of November 2025, it contained eight species, found in Victoria, New South Wales, and Queensland:

- Barahna booloumba Davies, 2003 (type) – Australia (Queensland, New South Wales)
- Barahna brooyar Davies, 2003 – Australia (Queensland)
- Barahna glenelg Davies, 2003 – Australia (Victoria)
- Barahna myall Davies, 2003 – Australia (New South Wales)
- Barahna scoria Davies, 2003 – Australia (Queensland)
- Barahna taroom Davies, 2003 – Australia (Queensland)
- Barahna toonumbar Davies, 2003 – Australia (New South Wales)
- Barahna yeppoon Davies, 2003 – Australia (Queensland, New South Wales)
