= Calacadia =

Scientific classification
- Kingdom: Animalia
- Phylum: Arthropoda
- Subphylum: Chelicerata
- Class: Arachnida
- Order: Araneae
- Infraorder: Araneomorphae
- Family: Desidae
- Genus: Calacadia; Exline, 1960

Type species
- C. chilensis Exline, 1960

Species
- 7, see text

Genus of spiders

Calacadia is a genus of South American intertidal spiders first described by H. Exline in 1960.

== Species ==
As of April 2019 it contains seven species, all found in Chile:

- Calacadia ambigua (Nicolet, 1849) – Chile
- Calacadia chilensis Exline, 1960 – Chile
- Calacadia dentifera (Tullgren, 1902) – Chile
- Calacadia livens (Simon, 1902) – Chile
- Calacadia osorno Exline, 1960 – Chile
- Calacadia radulifera (Simon, 1902) – Chile
- Calacadia rossi Exline, 1960 – Chile
