= Cedicus =

Scientific classification
- Kingdom: Animalia
- Phylum: Arthropoda
- Subphylum: Chelicerata
- Class: Arachnida
- Order: Araneae
- Infraorder: Araneomorphae
- Family: Desidae
- Genus: Cedicus; Simon, 1875

Type species
- C. flavipes Simon, 1875

Species
- 5, see text

Genus of spiders

Cedicus is a genus of araneomorph spiders in the family Desidae, and was first described by Eugène Simon in 1875.

== Species ==
As of November 2024 it contains five species:

- Cedicus bucculentus Simon, 1889 – Himalayas
- Cedicus dubius Strand, 1907 – Japan
- Cedicus flavipes Simon, 1875 (type) – Eastern Mediterranean
- Cedicus israeliensis Levy, 1996 – Turkey, Israel
- Cedicus pumilus Thorell, 1895 – Myanmar
