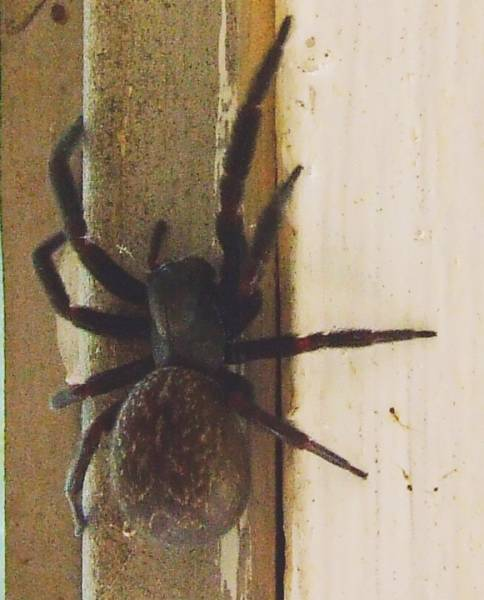
- Badumna insignis
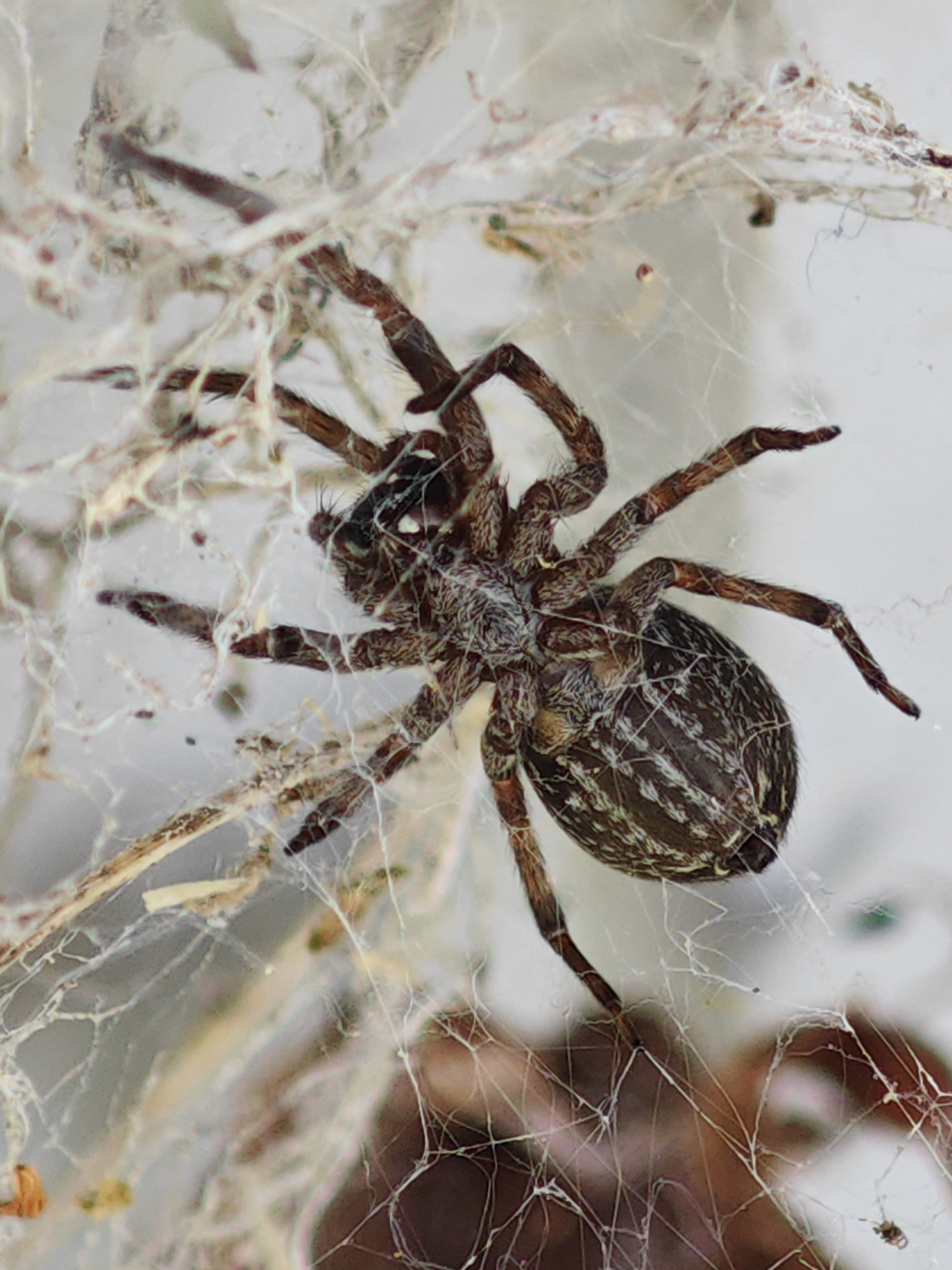
- Badumna longinqua

Scientific classification
- Kingdom: Animalia
- Phylum: Arthropoda
- Subphylum: Chelicerata
- Class: Arachnida
- Order: Araneae
- Infraorder: Araneomorphae
- Family: Desidae; Pocock, 1895

Diversity
- 63 genera, 323 species
- blue: reported countries (WSC) green: observation hotspots (iNaturalist)

= Desidae =

Desidae Temporal range: Palaeogene–present

Family of spiders

Desidae is a family of spiders, some of which are known as intertidal spiders. The family is named for the genus Desis, members of which inhabit the intertidal zone. The family has been reevaluated in recent years and now includes inland genera and species as well, such as Badumna and Phryganoporus. The vast majority of genera currently included in Desidae are native to Australia, New Zealand, or New Caledonia, although some are found in other parts of the world.

In 2017, the family Amphinectidae was merged into Desidae and the family Toxopidae was separated from it. Those intertidal spiders that are truly marine commonly live in barnacle shells, which they seal up with silk; this allows them to maintain an air bubble during high tide. They emerge at night to feed on various small arthropods that live in the intertidal zone.

== Distribution ==
As now circumscribed, the family Desidae is mainly found in South America and Australasia, with some species reaching north to Malaysia.

Metaltella simoni has been introduced in a large part of the Southern United States (records exist from California, Louisiana, Mississippi, and Florida). It is feared that it could extirpate the native titanoecid species Titanoeca brunnea.

== Genera ==
As of January 2026, this family includes 63 genera and 323 species:

- Akatorea Forster & Wilton, 1973 – New Zealand
- Amphinecta Simon, 1898 – New Zealand
- Austmusia Gray, 1983 – Australia
- Badumna Thorell, 1890 – China, Indonesia, Australia. Introduced to South Africa, Japan, Germany, Netherlands, Mexico, United States, New Zealand, Brazil, Uruguay, Britain
- Baiami Lehtinen, 1967 – Australia
- Bakala Davies, 1990 – Australia
- Barahna Davies, 2003 – Australia
- Buyina Davies, 1998 – Australia
- Calacadia Exline, 1960 – Chile
- Cambridgea L. Koch, 1872 – New Caledonia, New Zealand
- Canala Gray, 1992 – New Caledonia
- Cedicoides Charitonov, 1946 – Tajikistan, Turkmenistan, Uzbekistan
- Cedicus Simon, 1875 – Japan, Myanmar, Israel, Turkey, Eastern Mediterranean, Himalayas
- Cicirra Simon, 1886 – Australia
- Colcarteria Gray, 1992 – Australia
- Corasoides Butler, 1929 – Australia, Papua New Guinea
- Cunnawarra Davies, 1998 – Australia
- Desis Walckenaer, 1837 – Eastern Africa, Namibia, South Africa, China, Japan, Indonesia, Singapore, India, Australia, New Caledonia, New Guinea, New Zealand, Samoa, Galapagos
- Dunstanoides Forster & Wilton, 1989 – New Zealand
- Epimecinus Simon, 1908 – Australia, New Caledonia
- Forsterina Lehtinen, 1967 – Australia, New Caledonia
- Goyenia Forster, 1970 – New Zealand
- Helsonia Forster, 1970 – New Zealand
- Holomamoea Forster & Wilton, 1973 – New Zealand
- Huara Forster, 1964 – New Zealand
- Ischalea L. Koch, 1872 – Madagascar, Mauritius, New Zealand
- Jalkaraburra Davies, 1998 – Australia
- Keera Davies, 1998 – Australia
- Lathyarcha Simon, 1908 – Australia
- Magua Davies, 1998 – Australia
- Makora Forster & Wilton, 1973 – New Zealand
- Mamoea Forster & Wilton, 1973 – New Zealand
- Mangareia Forster, 1970 – New Zealand
- Maniho Marples, 1959 – New Zealand
- Manjala Davies, 1990 – Australia
- Matachia Dalmas, 1917 – New Zealand
- Mesudus Özdikmen, 2007 – New Zealand
- Metaltella Mello-Leitão, 1931 – South America. Introduced to North America
- Namandia Lehtinen, 1967 – Australia
- Nanocambridgea Forster & Wilton, 1973 – New Zealand
- Neororea Forster & Wilton, 1973 – New Zealand
- Notomatachia Forster, 1970 – New Zealand
- Nuisiana Forster & Wilton, 1973 – New Zealand
- Oparara Forster & Wilton, 1973 – New Zealand
- Panoa Forster, 1970 – New Zealand
- Paracedicus Fet, 1993 – Kazakhstan, Turkmenistan, Western Asia
- Paramamoea Forster & Wilton, 1973 – New Zealand
- Paramatachia Dalmas, 1918 – Australia
- Penaoola Davies, 1998 – Australia
- Phryganoporus Simon, 1908 – Australia
- Pitonga Davies, 1984 – Northern Australia
- Poaka Forster & Wilton, 1973 – New Zealand
- Porteria Simon, 1904 – Chile
- Quemusia Davies, 1998 – Australia
- Rangitata Forster & Wilton, 1973 – New Zealand
- Rapua Forster, 1970 – New Zealand
- Reinga Forster & Wilton, 1973 – New Zealand
- Rorea Forster & Wilton, 1973 – New Zealand
- Syrorisa Simon, 1908 – Australia, New Caledonia
- Tanganoides Davies, 2005 – Australia
- Taurongia Hogg, 1901 – Australia
- Tuakana Forster, 1970 – New Zealand
- Waterea Forster & Wilton, 1973 – New Zealand
