= List of Lamponidae species =

This page lists all described species of the spider family Lamponidae accepted by the World Spider Catalog as of February 2021:

== A ==
=== Asadipus ===
Asadipus

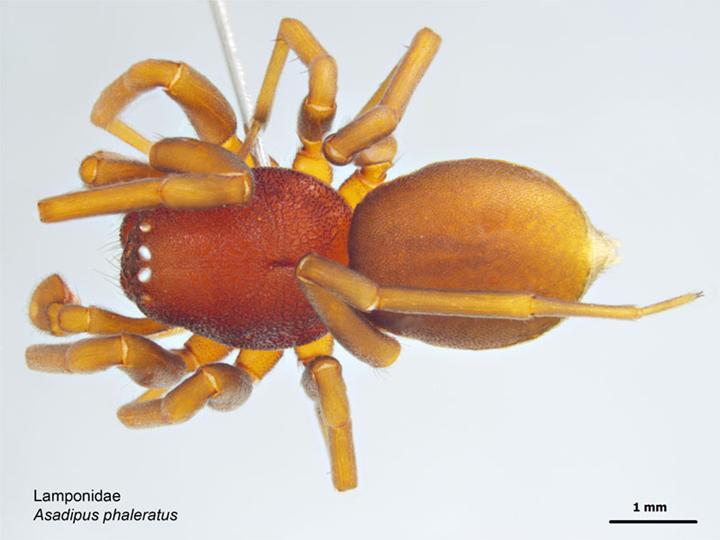
Asadipus phaleratus

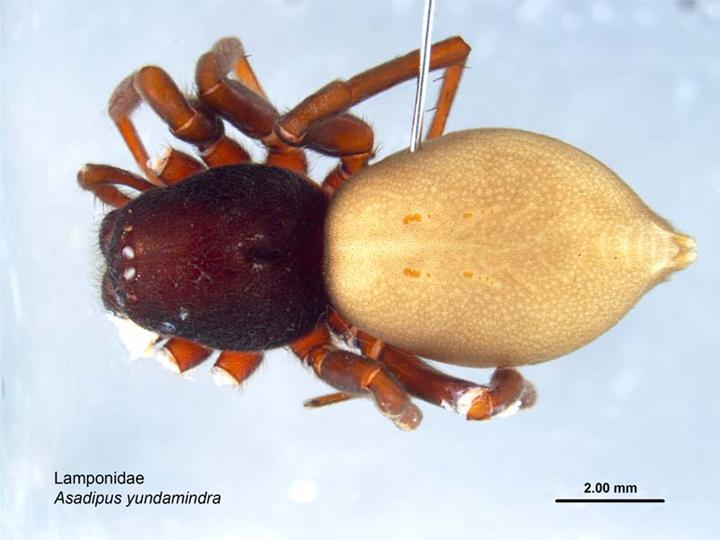
Asadipus yundamindra

Asadipus Simon, 1897

- A. areyonga Platnick, 2000 — Australia (Northern Territory, Queensland)
- A. auld Platnick, 2000 — Australia (Western Australia, South Australia)
- A. banjiwarn Platnick, 2000 — Australia (Western Australia)
- A. baranar Platnick, 2000 — Australia (Western Australia)
- A. barant Platnick, 2000 — Australia (Western Australia)
- A. barlee Platnick, 2000 — Australia (Western Australia)
- A. bucks Platnick, 2000 — Australia (South Australia, Victoria)
- A. cape Platnick, 2000 — Australia (Western Australia)
- A. croydon Platnick, 2000 — Australia (Queensland)
- A. humptydoo Platnick, 2000 — Australia (Northern Territory)
- A. insolens (Simon, 1896) (type) — Australia (Queensland)
- A. julia Platnick, 2000 — Australia (Northern Territory, Queensland)
- A. kunderang Platnick, 2000 — Australia
- A. longforest Platnick, 2000 — Australia (South Australia, Victoria, Tasmania)
- A. mountant Platnick, 2000 — Australia (Western Australia)
- A. palmerston Platnick, 2000 — Australia (Northern Territory)
- A. phaleratus (Simon, 1909) — Australia (Western Australia, South Australia, Queensland)
- A. uphill Platnick, 2000 — Australia (Queensland)
- A. woodleigh Platnick, 2000 — Australia (Western Australia)
- A. yundamindra Platnick, 2000 — Australia (Western Australia)

== B ==
=== Bigenditia ===
Bigenditia

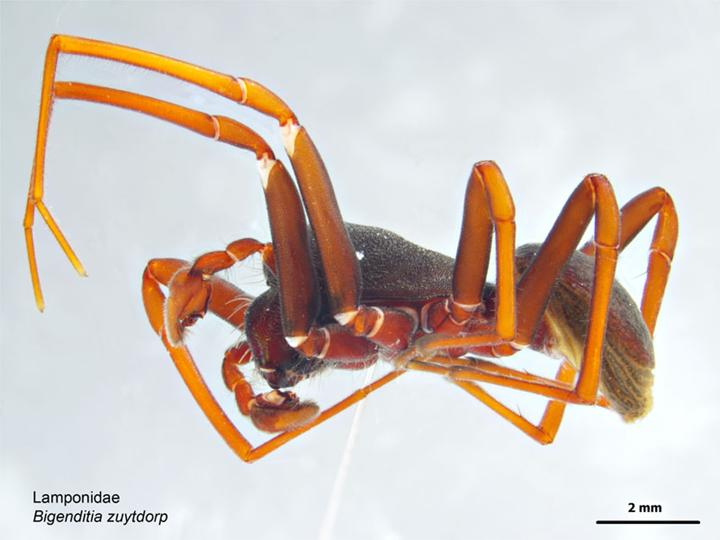
Bigenditia zuytdorp

Bigenditia Platnick, 2000

- B. millawa Platnick, 2000 — Eastern Australia
- B. zuytdorp Platnick, 2000 (type) — Australia (Western Australia, South Australia)

== C ==
=== Centrocalia ===
Centrocalia Platnick, 2000

- C. chazeaui Platnick, 2000 (type) — New Caledonia
- C. lifoui (Berland, 1929) — New Caledonia, Loyalty Is.
- C. ningua Platnick, 2000 — New Caledonia

=== Centroina ===
Centroina Platnick, 2002

- C. blundells (Platnick, 2000) — Australian Capital Territory
- C. bondi (Platnick, 2000) — Australian Capital Territory, Victoria
- C. dorrigo (Platnick, 2000) — Australia (New South Wales)
- C. enfield (Platnick, 2000) — Australia (New South Wales)
- C. keira (Platnick, 2000) (type) — Australia (New South Wales)
- C. kota (Platnick, 2000) — Australia (New South Wales)
- C. lewis (Platnick, 2000) — Australia (Queensland)
- C. macedon (Platnick, 2000) — Australia (New South Wales, Victoria)
- C. sawpit (Platnick, 2000) — Australia (New South Wales, Victoria)
- C. sherbrook (Platnick, 2000) — Australia (Victoria)
- C. whian (Platnick, 2000) — Australia (New South Wales)

=== Centrothele ===
Centrothele L. Koch, 1873

- C. cardell Platnick, 2000 — Australia (Queensland)
- C. coalston Platnick, 2000 — Australia (Queensland)
- C. fisher Platnick, 2000 — Australia (Queensland)
- C. gordon Platnick, 2000 — Australia (Queensland, New South Wales)
- C. kuranda Platnick, 2000 — Australia (Queensland)
- C. lorata L. Koch, 1873 (type) — Australia (Queensland)
- C. mossman Platnick, 2000 — Australia (Queensland)
- C. mutica (Simon, 1897) — Australia (Queensland, New South Wales), New Guinea
- C. nardi Platnick, 2000 — Australia (Queensland, New South Wales)
- C. spurgeon Platnick, 2000 — Australia (Queensland)

=== Centsymplia ===
Centsymplia Platnick, 2000

- C. glorious Platnick, 2000 (type) — Australia (Queensland, New South Wales)

== G ==
=== Graycassis ===
Graycassis Platnick, 2000

- G. barrington Platnick, 2000 — Australia (New South Wales)
- G. boss Platnick, 2000 — Australia (New South Wales)
- G. bruxner Platnick, 2000 — Australia (New South Wales)
- G. bulga Platnick, 2000 — Australia (New South Wales)
- G. chichester Platnick, 2000 — Australia (Queensland, New South Wales)
- G. dorrigo Platnick, 2000 — Australia (New South Wales)
- G. enfield Platnick, 2000 — Australia (New South Wales)
- G. marengo Platnick, 2000 (type) — Australia (New South Wales)
- G. scrub Platnick, 2000 — Australia (New South Wales)
- G. styx Platnick, 2000 — Australia (New South Wales)

== L ==
=== Lampona ===
Lampona

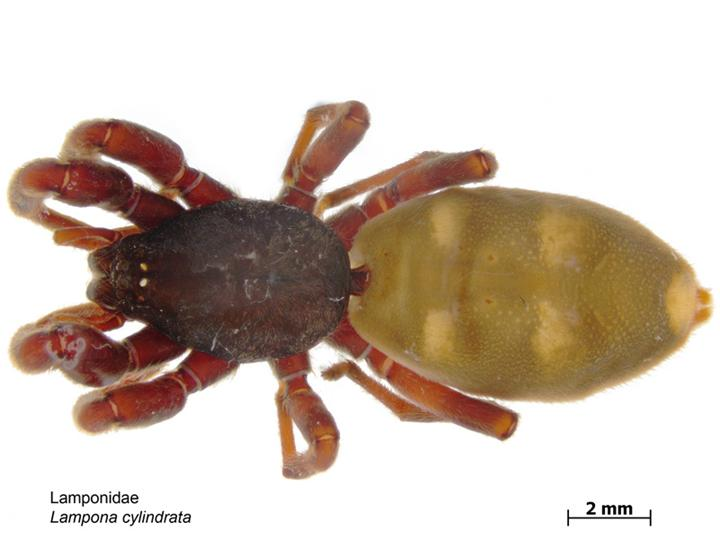
Lampona cylindrata

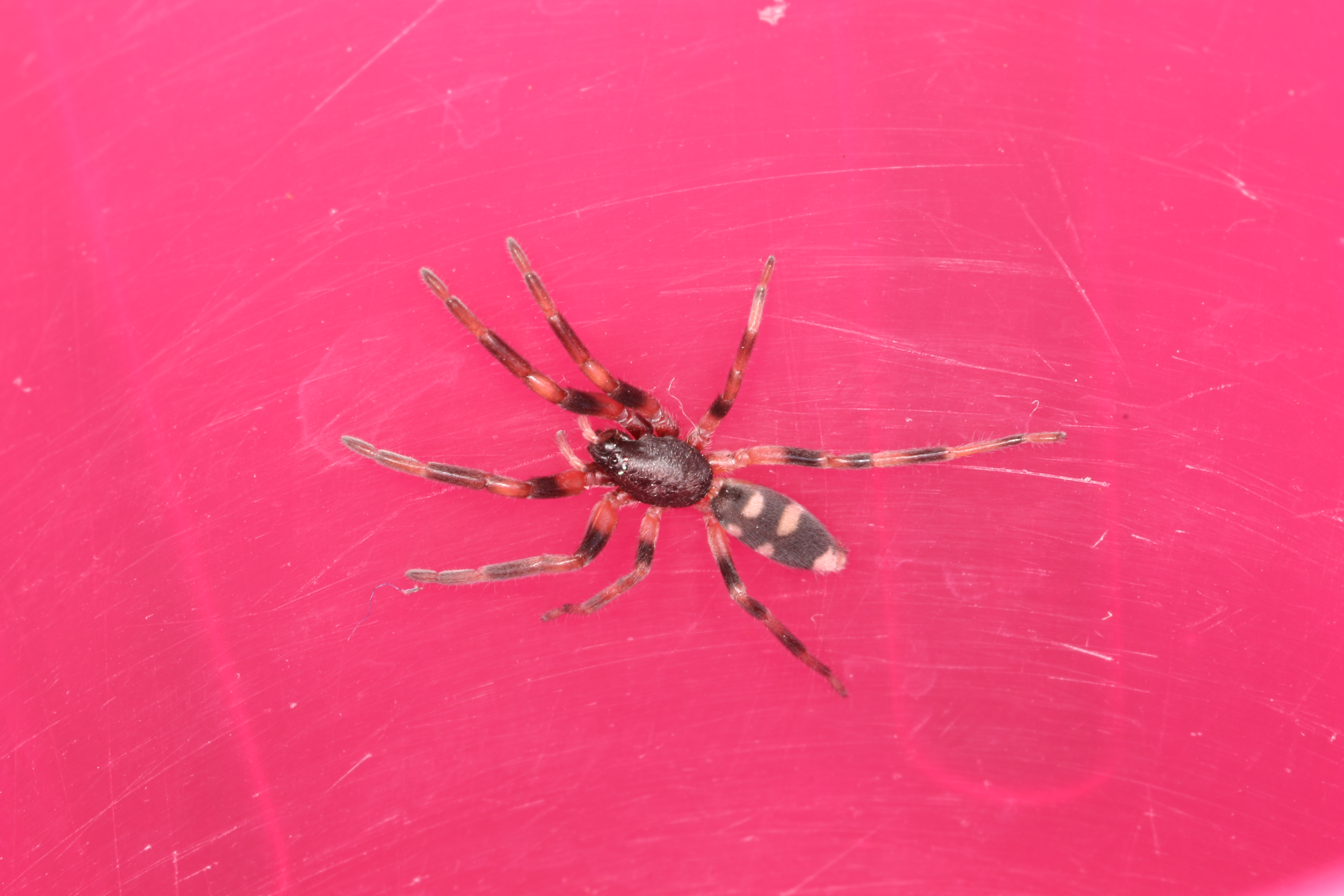
Lampona murina

Lampona Thorell, 1869

- L. airlie Platnick, 2000 — Australia (Queensland)
- L. allyn Platnick, 2000 — Australia (New South Wales)
- L. ampeinna Platnick, 2000 — Australia (Western Australia, central Australia)
- L. barrow Platnick, 2000 — Australia (Western Australia)
- L. braemar Platnick, 2000 — Eastern Australia, Tasmania
- L. brevipes L. Koch, 1872 — Australia (Western Australia)
- L. bunya Platnick, 2000 — Australia (Queensland)
- L. carlisle Platnick, 2000 — Australia (Queensland)
- L. chalmers Platnick, 2000 — Australia (Queensland)
- L. chinghee Platnick, 2000 — Australia (Queensland, New South Wales)
- L. cohuna Platnick, 2000 — Australia (South Australia, Victoria)
- L. cudgen Platnick, 2000 — Australia (Queensland, New South Wales, Victoria)
- L. cumberland Platnick, 2000 — Australia (Victoria)
- L. cylindrata (L. Koch, 1866) (type) — Australia. Introduced to New Zealand
- L. danggali Platnick, 2000 — Central, Eastern Australia
- L. davies Platnick, 2000 — Australia (Queensland)
- L. dwellingup Platnick, 2000 — Australia (Western Australia)
- L. eba Platnick, 2000 — Australia (South Australia)
- L. ewens Platnick, 2000 — Australia (South Australia, Tasmania)
- L. fife Platnick, 2000 — Australia (New South Wales, Victoria)
- L. finke Platnick, 2000 — Australia (Northern Territory, South Australia)
- L. finnigan Platnick, 2000 — Australia (Queensland)
- L. flavipes L. Koch, 1872 — Central, Eastern Australia
- L. foliifera Simon, 1908 — Australia (Western Australia, central Australia)
- L. garnet Platnick, 2000 — Australia (Queensland)
- L. gilles Platnick, 2000 — Australia (South Australia)
- L. gosford Platnick, 2000 — Australia (New South Wales, Victoria)
- L. hickmani Platnick, 2000 — Australia (Tasmania)
- L. hirsti Platnick, 2000 — Australia (South Australia)
- L. kapalga Platnick, 2000 — Australia (Northern Territory, Queensland)
- L. kirrama Platnick, 2000 — Australia (Queensland)
- L. lamington Platnick, 2000 — Australia (Queensland)
- L. lomond Platnick, 2000 — Southeastern Australia, Tasmania
- L. macilenta L. Koch, 1873 — Southern Australia
- L. mildura Platnick, 2000 — Australia (New South Wales, Victoria)
- L. molloy Platnick, 2000 — Australia (Queensland)
- L. monteithi Platnick, 2000 — Australia (Queensland)
- L. moorilyanna Platnick, 2000 — Australia (Queensland, South Australia)
- L. murina L. Koch, 1873 — Australia. Introduced to New Zealand
- L. olga Platnick, 2000 — Australia (Northern Territory)
- L. ooldea Platnick, 2000 — Australia (South Australia, Victoria)
- L. papua Platnick, 2000 — New Guinea
- L. punctigera Simon, 1908 — Southern Australia
- L. pusilla L. Koch, 1873 — Eastern Australia
- L. quinqueplagiata Simon, 1908 — Australia (Western Australia)
- L. ruida L. Koch, 1873 — Eastern Australia, Tasmania
- L. russell Platnick, 2000 — Australia (Queensland)
- L. spec Platnick, 2000 — Australia (Queensland)
- L. superbus Platnick, 2000 — Australia (Queensland)
- L. talbingo Platnick, 2000 — Southeastern Australia
- L. taroom Platnick, 2000 — Australia (Queensland)
- L. terrors Platnick, 2000 — Australia (Queensland)
- L. torbay Platnick, 2000 — Australia (Western Australia)
- L. tulley Platnick, 2000 — Australia (Queensland)
- L. walsh Platnick, 2000 — Australia (Western Australia)
- L. whaleback Platnick, 2000 — Australia (Western Australia)
- L. yanchep Platnick, 2000 — Australia (Western Australia)

=== Lamponata ===
Lamponata Platnick, 2000

- L. daviesae Platnick, 2000 (type) — Australia

=== Lamponega ===
Lamponega Platnick, 2000

- L. arcoona Platnick, 2000 (type) — Southern Australia
- L. forceps Platnick, 2000 — Australia (Western Australia)
- L. serpentine Platnick, 2000 — Australia (South Australia)

=== Lamponella ===
Lamponella Platnick, 2000

- L. ainslie Platnick, 2000 (type) — Southern Australia, Tasmania
- L. beaury Platnick, 2000 — Australia (Queensland, New South Wales)
- L. brookfield Platnick, 2000 — Australia (Queensland)
- L. homevale Platnick, 2000 — Australia (Queensland)
- L. kanangra Platnick, 2000 — Australia (New South Wales)
- L. kimba Platnick, 2000 — Australia (Western Australia, South Australia)
- L. kroombit Platnick, 2000 — Australia (Queensland)
- L. taroom Platnick, 2000 — Australia (Queensland)
- L. wombat Platnick, 2000 — Australian Capital Territory
- L. wyandotte Platnick, 2000 — Australia (Queensland)

=== Lamponicta ===
Lamponicta Platnick, 2000

- L. cobon Platnick, 2000 (type) — Australia (New South Wales, Victoria)

=== Lamponina ===
Lamponina Strand, 1913

- L. asperrima (Hickman, 1950) — Australia (South Australia)
- L. elongata Platnick, 2000 — Southern Australia
- L. isa Platnick, 2000 — Australia (Northern Territory, Queensland)
- L. kakadu Platnick, 2000 — Australia (Northern Territory)
- L. loftia Platnick, 2000 — Australia (South Australia, Victoria)
- L. scutata (Strand, 1913) (type) — Australia

=== Lamponoides ===
Lamponoides Platnick, 2000

- L. coottha Platnick, 2000 (type) — Australia (Queensland, New South Wales)

=== Lamponova ===
Lamponova Platnick, 2000

- L. wau Platnick, 2000 (type) — New Guinea, Australia (New South Wales, Victoria)

=== Lamponusa ===
Lamponusa Platnick, 2000

- L. gleneagle Platnick, 2000 (type) — Australia (Western Australia)

=== Longepi ===
Longepi Platnick, 2000

- L. barmah Platnick, 2000 — Eastern Australia
- L. bondi Platnick, 2000 — Australia (New South Wales, Victoria)
- L. boyd Platnick, 2000 (type) — Australia (New South Wales, Australian Capital Territory)
- L. canungra Platnick, 2000 — Australia (Queensland)
- L. cobon Platnick, 2000 — Australia (Victoria)
- L. durin Platnick, 2000 — Australia (Western Australia)
- L. tarra Platnick, 2000 — Australia (Victoria)
- L. woodman Platnick, 2000 — Southern Australia

== N ==
=== Notsodipus ===
Notsodipus Platnick, 2000

- N. barlee Platnick, 2000 — Australia (Western Australia)
- N. bidgemia Platnick, 2000 — Australia (Western Australia)
- N. blackall Platnick, 2000 — Australia (Queensland)
- N. broadwater Platnick, 2000 — Australia (Queensland)
- N. capensis Platnick, 2000 — Australia (Western Australia)
- N. dalby Platnick, 2000 (type) — Eastern Australia
- N. domain Platnick, 2000 — Southern Australia, Tasmania
- N. innot Platnick, 2000 — Australia (Queensland)
- N. keilira Platnick, 2000 — Australia (South Australia, Victoria)
- N. linnaei Platnick & Dupérré, 2008 — Australia (Western Australia)
- N. magdala Platnick, 2000 — Australia (Northern Territory)
- N. marun Platnick, 2000 — Australia (Western Australia, Northern Territory, Queensland)
- N. meedo Platnick, 2000 — Australia (Western Australia)
- N. muckera Platnick, 2000 — Southern Australia
- N. quobba Platnick, 2000 — Australia (Western Australia)
- N. renmark Platnick, 2000 — Australia (South Australia, Victoria)
- N. upstart Platnick, 2000 — Australia (Queensland)
- N. visio Platnick, 2000 — Australia (Western Australia, South Australia)

== P ==
=== Paralampona ===
Paralampona Platnick, 2000

- P. aurumagua Platnick, 2000 — Australia (Queensland)
- P. cobon Platnick, 2000 — Australia (Victoria)
- P. domain Platnick, 2000 (type) — Southeastern Australia, Tasmania
- P. kiola Platnick, 2000 — Australia (New South Wales, Australian Capital Territory)
- P. marangaroo Platnick, 2000 — Australia (Western Australia)
- P. renmark Platnick, 2000 — Australia (South Australia, New South Wales)
- P. sherlock Platnick, 2000 — Southeastern Australia
- P. wogwog Platnick, 2000 — Australia (New South Wales)

=== Platylampona ===
Platylampona Platnick, 2004

- P. mazeppa Platnick, 2004 (type) — Australia (Queensland, New South Wales)

=== Prionosternum ===
Prionosternum Dunn, 1951

- P. nitidiceps (Simon, 1909) — Southern Australia, Tasmania
- P. porongurup Platnick, 2000 — Australia (Western Australia)
- P. scutatum Dunn, 1951 (type) — Australia (Western Australia)

=== Pseudolampona ===
Pseudolampona Platnick, 2000

- P. binnowee Platnick, 2000 — Australia (New South Wales)
- P. boree Platnick, 2000 — Southern Australia
- P. emmett Platnick, 2000 — Australia (Queensland)
- P. glenmore Platnick, 2000 — Australia (Queensland)
- P. jarrahdale Platnick, 2000 — Australia (Western Australia)
- P. kroombit Platnick, 2000 — Australia (Queensland)
- P. marun Platnick, 2000 — Australia (Western Australia)
- P. spurgeon Platnick, 2000 — Australia (Queensland)
- P. taroom Platnick, 2000 — Australia (Queensland, New South Wales)
- P. warrandyte Platnick, 2000 (type) — Southeastern Australia
- P. woodman Platnick, 2000 — Australia (Western Australia)
- P. wyandotte Platnick, 2000 — Australia (Queensland)

== Q ==
=== Queenvic ===
Queenvic Platnick, 2000

- Q. goanna Platnick, 2000 — Australia (Queensland, New South Wales)
- Q. kelty Platnick, 2000 — Australia (South Australia, Victoria)
- Q. mackay Platnick, 2000 (type) — Eastern Australia
- Q. piccadilly Platnick, 2000 — Southeastern Australia
