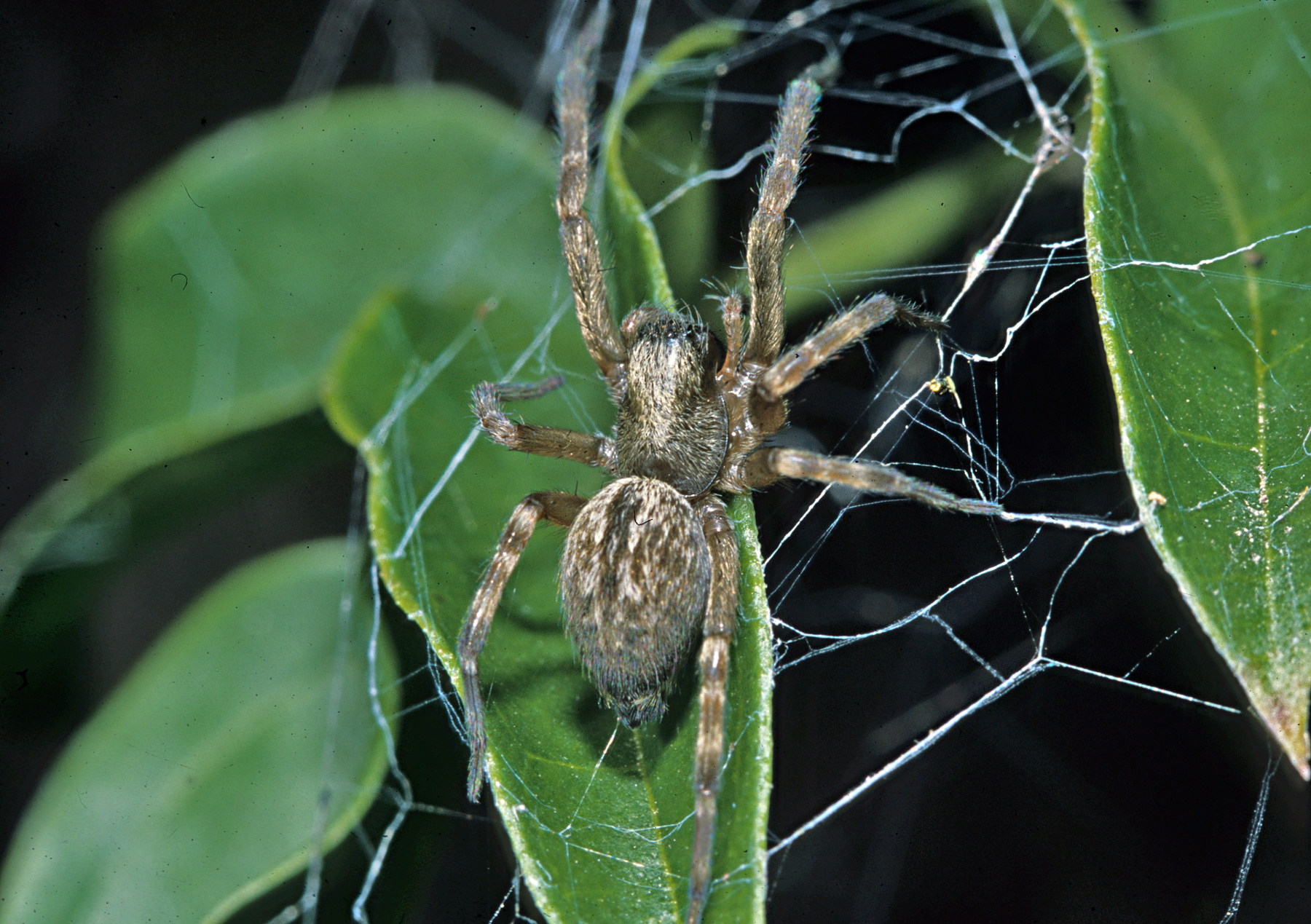
- Badumna longinqua
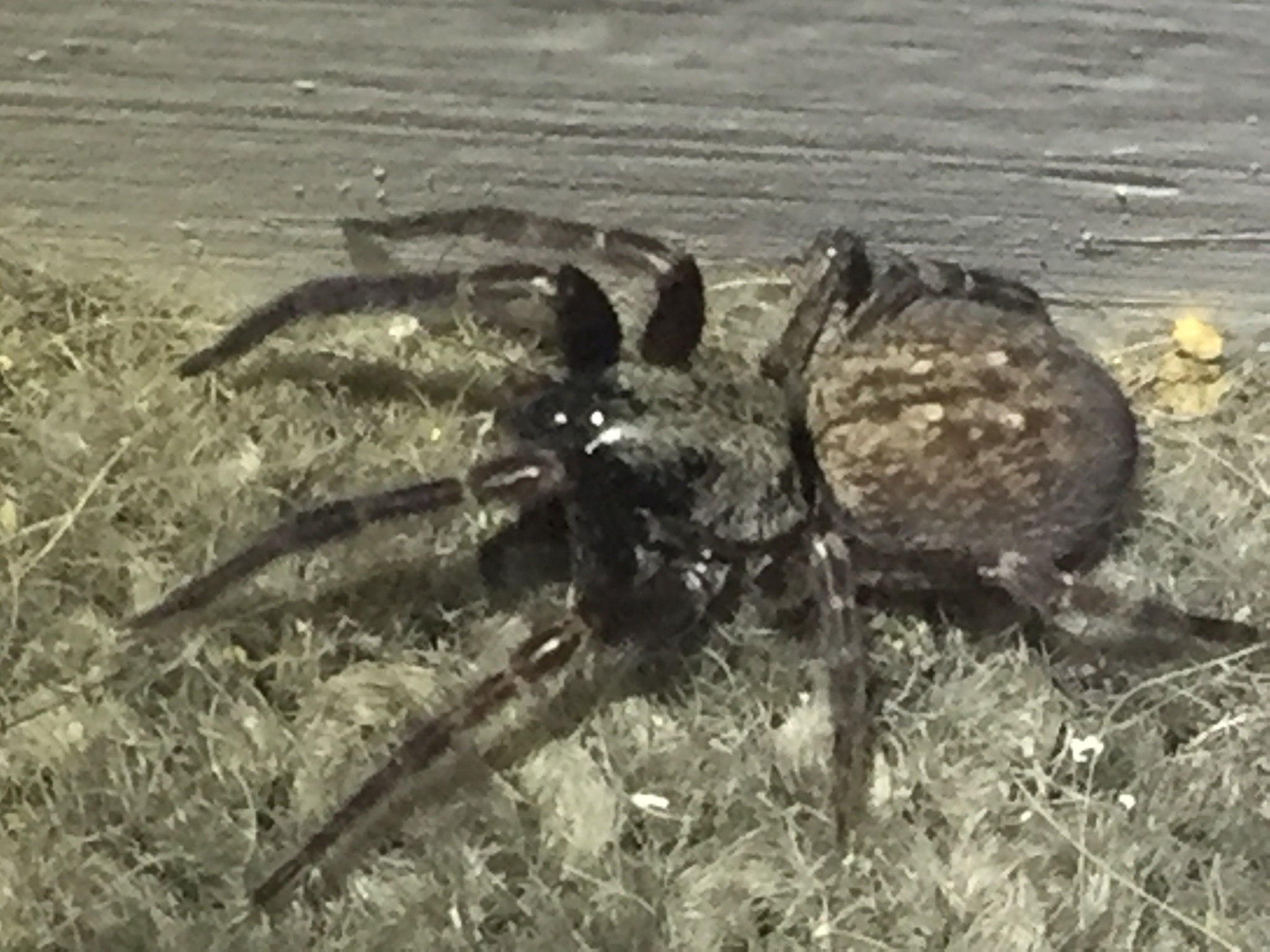
- B. longinqua

Scientific classification
- Kingdom: Animalia
- Phylum: Arthropoda
- Subphylum: Chelicerata
- Class: Arachnida
- Order: Araneae
- Infraorder: Araneomorphae
- Family: Desidae
- Genus: Badumna; Thorell, 1890

Type species
- B. hirsuta Thorell, 1890

Species
- 15, see text

Synonyms
- Aphyctoschaema Simon, 1902; Derxema Simon, 1906; Hesperauximus Gertsch, 1937; Ixeuticus Dalmas, 1917

= Badumna =

Genus of spiders

Badumna is a genus of intertidal spiders that was first described by Tamerlan Thorell in 1890. They are harmless spiders that can be found around human structures and buildings. The most well-known species is B. insignis, also known as the "black house spider" or "black window spider".

== Description ==
They are medium to large cribellate spiders. The carapace is pale brown to a darker brown in color, with long or small brown hairs being found besides smaller white hairs. The opisthosoma has a dark striping or spotting.

== Distribution ==
Most of the species are considered to be endemic in the Indo-Australian region, but some have been introduced elsewhere. B. longinqua is the only species introduced to North America, now found in urban areas along California's Pacific coast. B. insignis has also been found in Japan, though it is thought it was introduced.

== Species ==
As of October 2025, this genus includes fifteen species:

- Badumna arguta (Simon, 1906) – Australia (Queensland)
- Badumna bimetallica (Hogg, 1896) – Australia (Northern Territory)
- Badumna exilis Thorell, 1890 – Indonesia (Java)
- Badumna guttipes (Simon, 1906) – Australia (Victoria, Tasmania)
- Badumna hirsuta Thorell, 1890 – Indonesia (Java) (type species)
- Badumna hygrophila (Simon, 1902) – Australia (Queensland)
- Badumna insignis (L. Koch, 1872) – Australia. Introduced to Japan, New Zealand
- Badumna longinqua (L. Koch, 1867) – Australia. Introduced to New Zealand, United States, Mexico, Brazil, Uruguay, South Africa, Britain, Netherlands, Germany, Japan
- Badumna maculata (Rainbow, 1916) – Australia (Queensland)
- Badumna microps (Simon, 1908) – Australia (Western Australia)
- Badumna pilosa (Hogg, 1900) – Australia (Victoria)
- Badumna scalaris (L. Koch, 1872) – Australia (Queensland, central Australia)
- Badumna senilella (Strand, 1907) – Australia
- Badumna socialis (Rainbow, 1905) – Australia (New South Wales)
- Badumna tangae Zhu, Zhang & Yang, 2006 – China
