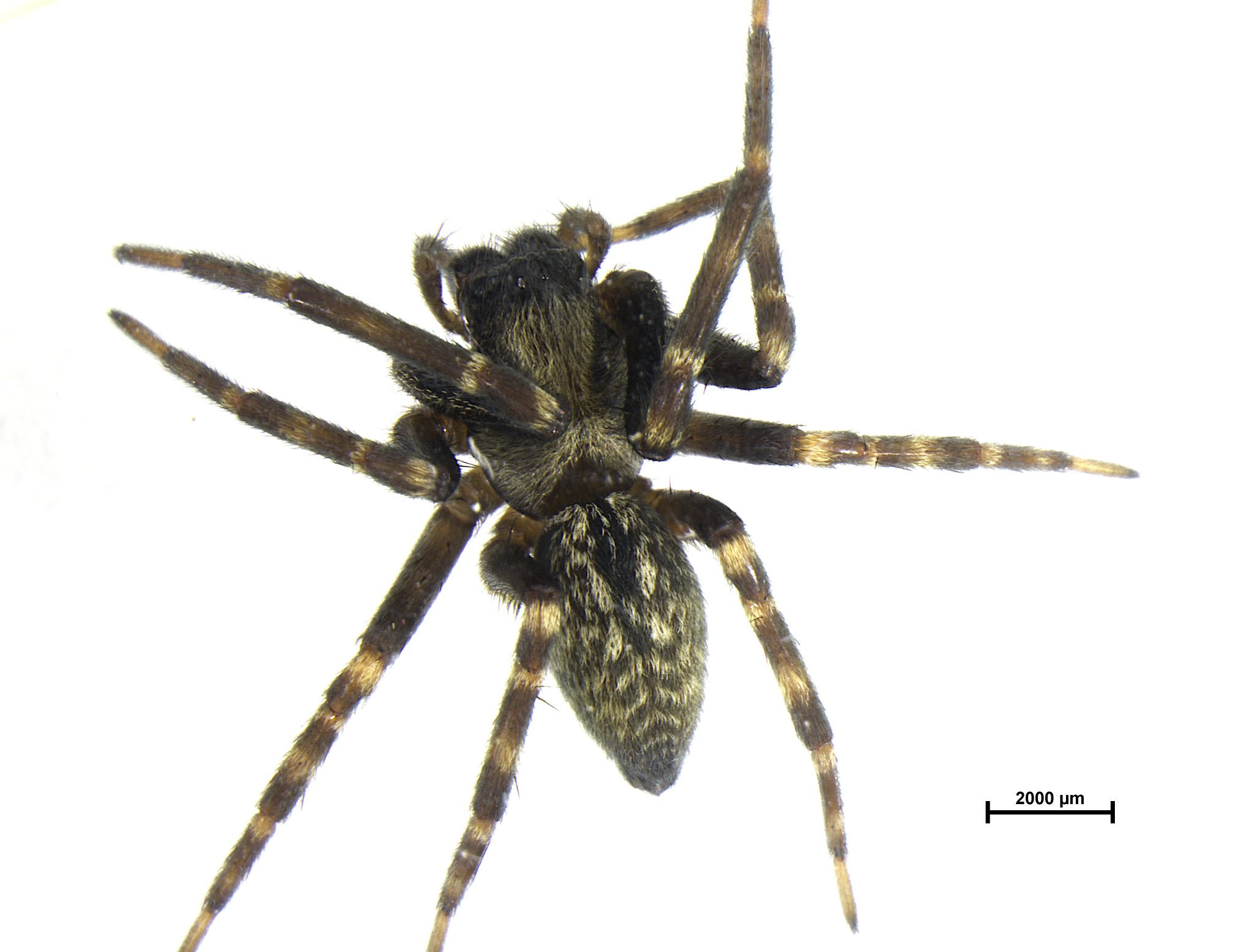
- from New Zealand
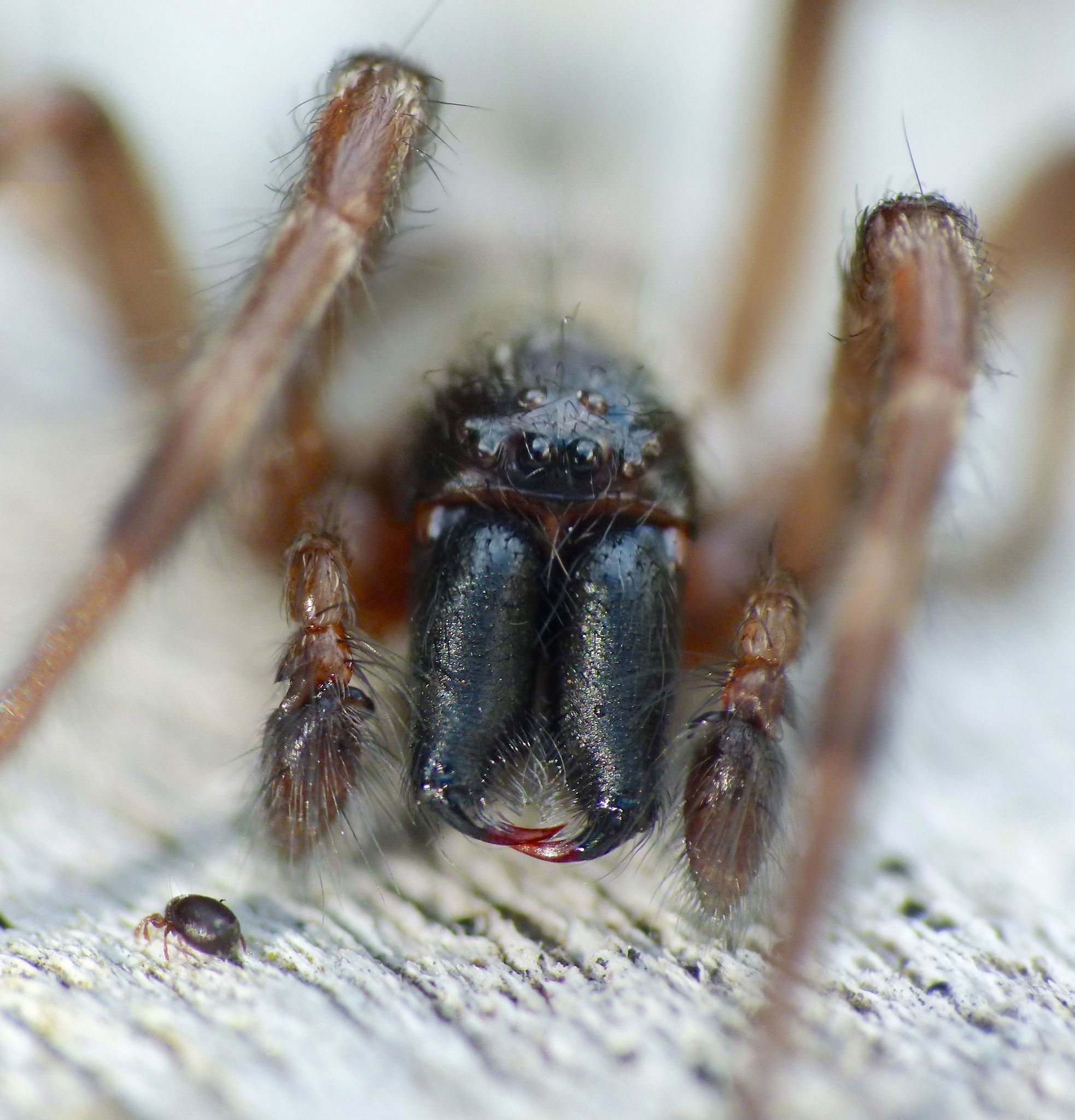
- male

Scientific classification
- Kingdom: Animalia
- Phylum: Arthropoda
- Subphylum: Chelicerata
- Class: Arachnida
- Order: Araneae
- Infraorder: Araneomorphae
- Family: Desidae
- Genus: Badumna
- Species: B. longinqua

Binomial name
- Badumna longinqua (L. Koch, 1867)

= Badumna longinqua =

Species of spider

Badumna longinqua, the grey house spider, is a species of spider in the family Desidae. Native to eastern Australia, it has been introduced into New Zealand, Japan, the United States, Mexico, Uruguay, Britain, and the Netherlands.

== Description ==
Badumna longinqua is an average-sized spider, with males attaining a maximum length of no more than 11 millimetres (0.43 in), while females are marginally larger with a maximum body length of 15 mm (0.59 in). Its common name, grey house spider, is due to colouration on the cephalothorax and abdomen, which are carpeted with light-grey hairs and spot-like markings and legs, which are purplish-brown in colour with hairs arranged into stripes on each leg. The similarly coloured brown carapace darkens nearer the chelicerae and eyes. Its eight eyes are small and black, with the front middle pair exceptionally larger at approximately 1 and a half times the size of surrounding eyes. Underneath these setae is an ovate abdomen and legs, which are purplish-brown in colour with hairs arranged into stripes on each leg.

== Distribution ==
=== New Zealand range ===
Badumna longinqua was originally native to eastern Australia. The spider was unintentionally introduced and colonised into New Zealand and now is widespread throughout both the North and South Islands. This species is found throughout the North Island but is selected within the South Island as it is not as common southern and western of the South Island due to unfavourable environmental conditions. The colonisation of this species has increased over the last few decades due to human transport and trade, most likely arriving during colonial times, via inert phoresy on ships, planes, trains, and merchandise. The species was only first reported in New Zealand in the twentieth century. The range expansion of the species is due to human activities. This is because Badumna longinqua is able to spread within goods in transportation such as ships, trains and planes, which, offer warmth and the availability of food. Another speculated arrival method is that of ballooning, a means of dispersal in Araneae where a spiderling lets out a thread of silk called gossamer, which is carried away by wind or a thermal updraft, causing the spider to become airborne. Badumna insignis, a closely related, slightly larger species, commonly named the common black spider or black house spider, has also colonised New Zealand, but only as far as the northern part of the North Island.

=== Geographic distribution ===
Aside from Australasia, B. longinqua has increased its global range to other countries including Argentina, Brazil, Germany, Japan, the United States, Uruguay, Canada, and South Africa

=== Habitat preferences ===
Badumna longinqua is mainly located in temperate zones or climates of the world. Temperate zones or climates are in the middle latitudes, which are found between the tropics and the polar regions. Environmental conditions can limit the success of a species but Badumna longinqua shows great tolerance and survival for varied climates. In most foreign nations including New Zealand, the grey house spider is a synanthropic species and is common in urban habitats and agroecosystems. The species resides almost exclusively in the somewhat artificial environments that are produced as a result of human inhabitancy, and not in wild habitats, for example natural forest. The distinctively messy web of B. longinqua can be found in many urban places, such as nooks and crannies on window frames and walls, in rubbish bins, under furniture, on car bodies and mirrors, trees bases and benches in urban parks, and artificial posies in cemeteries. Badumna longinqua have also been found in cemeteries in artificial flowers, which therefore suggest that they are very suitable to refuge. The species primarily are found living in tree trunks, rock walls, retreats, leaves, and tangled webbing in green shrubs. Badumna longinqua live in grasslands, riparian forests and wetlands. Higher densities of the species populations are found in trees near roads or urban areas where human activity is higher. Commercial Eucalyptus plantations in Uruguay, and Pinus plantations elsewhere provide an abundance of potential homes for the spiders, which often take up residence on the trees, positioning their hideaways under loose bark. In the United States, Badumna longinqua seems to be less reliant on a synanthropic relationship with people and can also be located in woodlands, along immediate coastal areas, within agricultural ecosystems, and recently in vineyards.

== Phenology ==
The female Badumna longinqua spider can potentially spend the whole of her life in the one same web, whereas the sexually mature male is forced to leave his home when it becomes time to reproduce. The male begins his hunt for females in the warmer months of the year, from summer through to early autumn. Although the details of B. longinqua courtship have not yet been formally described, and biology of the spider is not well studied, it is acknowledged in most cases to be a solitary spider. The lifespan of Badumna longinqua is not officially documented, however its closest relative Badumna insignis lives for a maximum of around two years, and so it could be postulated that B. longinqua would live for approximately the same period of time.

== Web ==
As a starting point for its web, Badumna longinqua first finds a satisfactory hiding place, such as a crack or small opening to funnel out its web from, which it then interlines with silk. From this tubular entrance, it builds a multitude of ladder-like webs in a radiating fashion, and for this reason it is placed into the ladderweb spiders grouping, of which it is one of only a few in New Zealand. The grey house spider's special cribellate silk is used for the connecting zig-zag patterned threads of the web. Located in the spider's rear legs, the calamistrum combs the silk of the web. As the web is occupied for long periods of time, with the female spider even remaining in her web for the entirety of her life unless compelled to move silken additions and restorations are carried out nightly, resulting in a disorderly looking web which becomes increasingly untidy over time. Despite possibly being one of the most abundant spiders around homes and buildings throughout New Zealand, B. longinqua itself is not often sighted as it feeds at night and will stay hidden in its retreat during the daytime. Furthermore, it generally does not go wandering into households in search of a mate as with other common species of Araneae. When night falls, the grey house spider exits its burrow to tend to its web, and then sit in wait of a meal.

== Prey ==
This species is a web-building spider meaning that it constructs its web in a calm and undisturbed place. Thus making them wait for food to come to them and capture their food. An assortment of insects are preyed upon by Badumna longinqua, including; small psyllids, ants, and moths, as well as some insects of considerably larger size than itself, like wasps, bees, and even bumblebees and cicadas. However, usually making up over half of the diet is, as could be expected, a variety of flies. Victims that make the fatal mistake of blundering into the sticky web are rushed at, bitten, and further entangled by the spider until unable to move or escape. If this prey is caught during the day, the grey house spider retires back into the safety of its burrow, to emerge after nightfall and feast on its earlier catch. Spiders feed by liquefying the prey through injection or regurgitation of digestive fluids into their prey to then proceed to suck the digested food.

== Predators and parasites ==
Parasitic wasps and flies can pose a risk to B. longinqua, but its greatest predator is the notorious hunting spider, Lampona, more commonly known as the white-tailed spider. There are two species of Lampona in New Zealand and both seem to readily predate grey house spiders as a favoured dietary choice. Along the Pacific Coast of California and presumably in other countries, grey house spiders are frequently preyed upon by the cosmopolitan long-bodied cellar spider or "daddy long legs" (Pholcus phalangioides), another very prevalent alien species which is likewise common and introduced in New Zealand. Many birds eat this species as well as some mammals (New Zealand Short-tailed Bats).
