= Grey house spider =

Grey house spider or gray house spider may refer to the following species:

- Badumna longinqua, related to the black house spider
- Zosis geniculatus
- Parasteatoda tepidariorum australis
