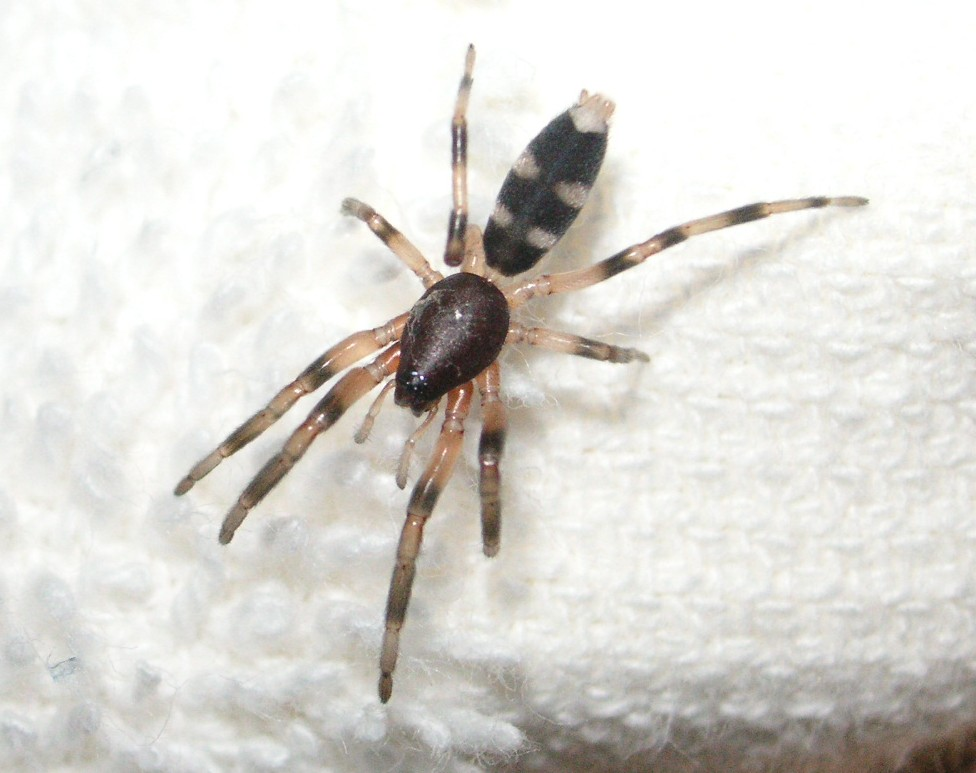
- unidentified lamponid
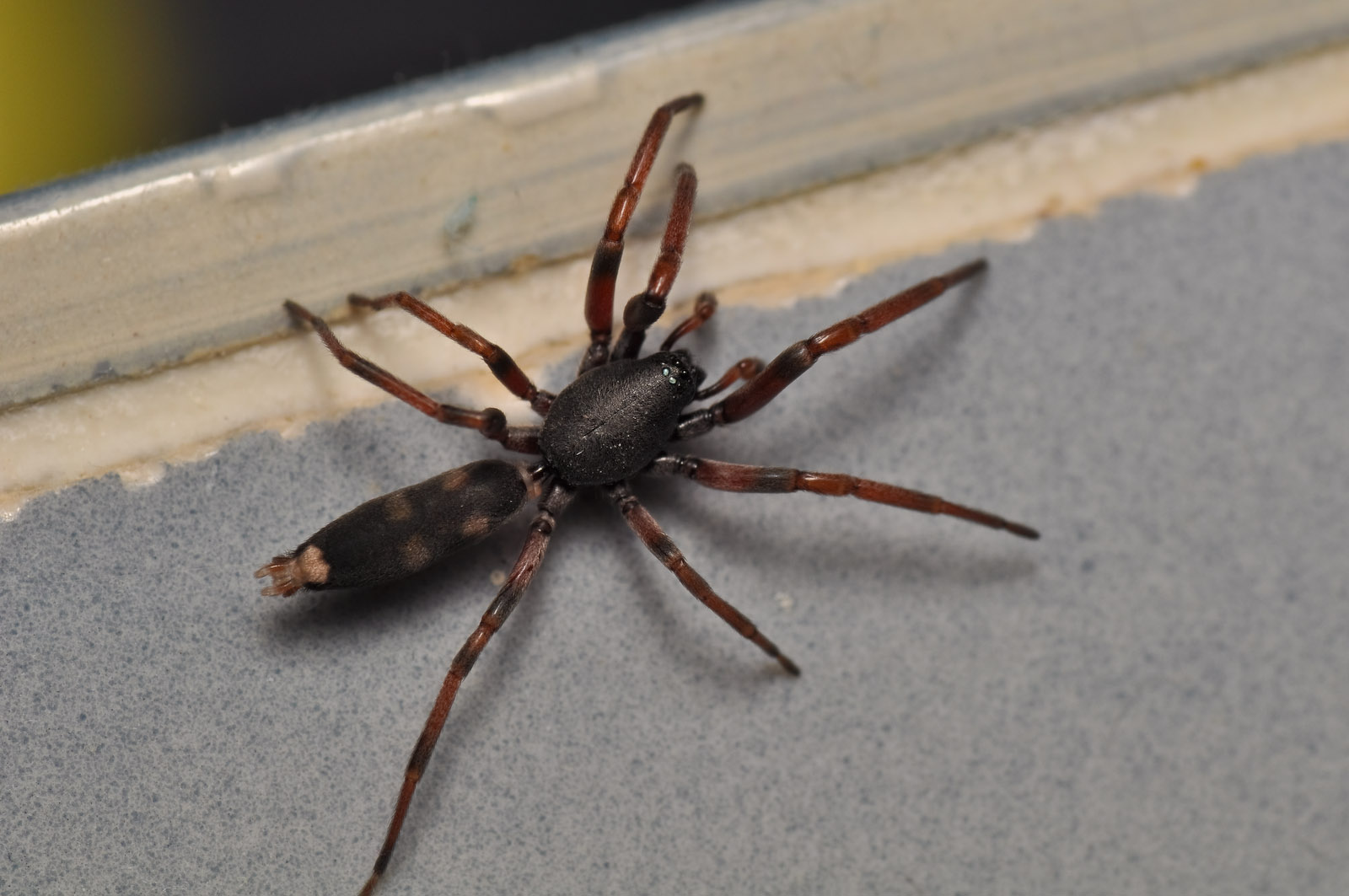
- Unidentified lamponiid from Castle Hill, Sydney

Scientific classification
- Kingdom: Animalia
- Phylum: Arthropoda
- Subphylum: Chelicerata
- Class: Arachnida
- Order: Araneae
- Infraorder: Araneomorphae
- Family: Lamponidae; Simon, 1893

Diversity
- 23 genera, 192 species
- blue: reported countries (WSC) green: observation hotspots (iNaturalist)

= Lamponidae =

white tailed spiders

Family of spiders

Lamponidae is a family of spiders first described by Eugène Simon in 1893. It contains about 200 described species in 23 genera, most of which are endemic to Australia, with the genus Centrocalia endemic to New Caledonia, and two Lampona species (L. cylindrata, L. murina) also occurring in New Zealand where they are commonly known as 'white-tailed spiders'. Lampona papua is endemic to New Guinea, where two otherwise Australian species (Centrothele mutica, Lamponova wau) also occur.

== Genera ==
As of January 2026, this family includes 23 genera and 192 species. The categorization into subfamilies follows Joel Hallan's Biology Catalog.

- Centrothelinae Platnick, 2000

- Asadipus Simon, 1897 – Australia
- Bigenditia Platnick, 2000 – Australia
- Centrocalia Platnick, 2000 – New Caledonia, Loyalty Islands
- Centroina Platnick, 2002 – Australia
- Centrothele L. Koch, 1873 – Australia, New Guinea
- Centsymplia Platnick, 2000 – Australia
- Graycassis Platnick, 2000 – Australia
- Longepi Platnick, 2000 – Australia
- Notsodipus Platnick, 2000 – Australia
- Prionosternum Dunn, 1951 – Australia, Tasmania
- Queenvic Platnick, 2000 – Australia

- Lamponinae Simon, 1893

- Lampona Thorell, 1869 – Australia, New Guinea. Introduced to New Zealand
- Lamponata Platnick, 2000 – Australia
- Lamponega Platnick, 2000 – Australia
- Lamponella Platnick, 2000 – Australia
- Lamponicta Platnick, 2000 – Australia
- Lamponina Strand, 1913 – Australia
- Lamponoides Platnick, 2000 – Australia
- Lamponova Platnick, 2000 – Australia, New Guinea
- Lamponusa Platnick, 2000 – Australia
- Platylampona Platnick, 2004 – Australia

- Pseudolamponinae Platnick, 2000

- Paralampona Platnick, 2000 – Australia, Tasmania
- Pseudolampona Platnick, 2000 – Australia
