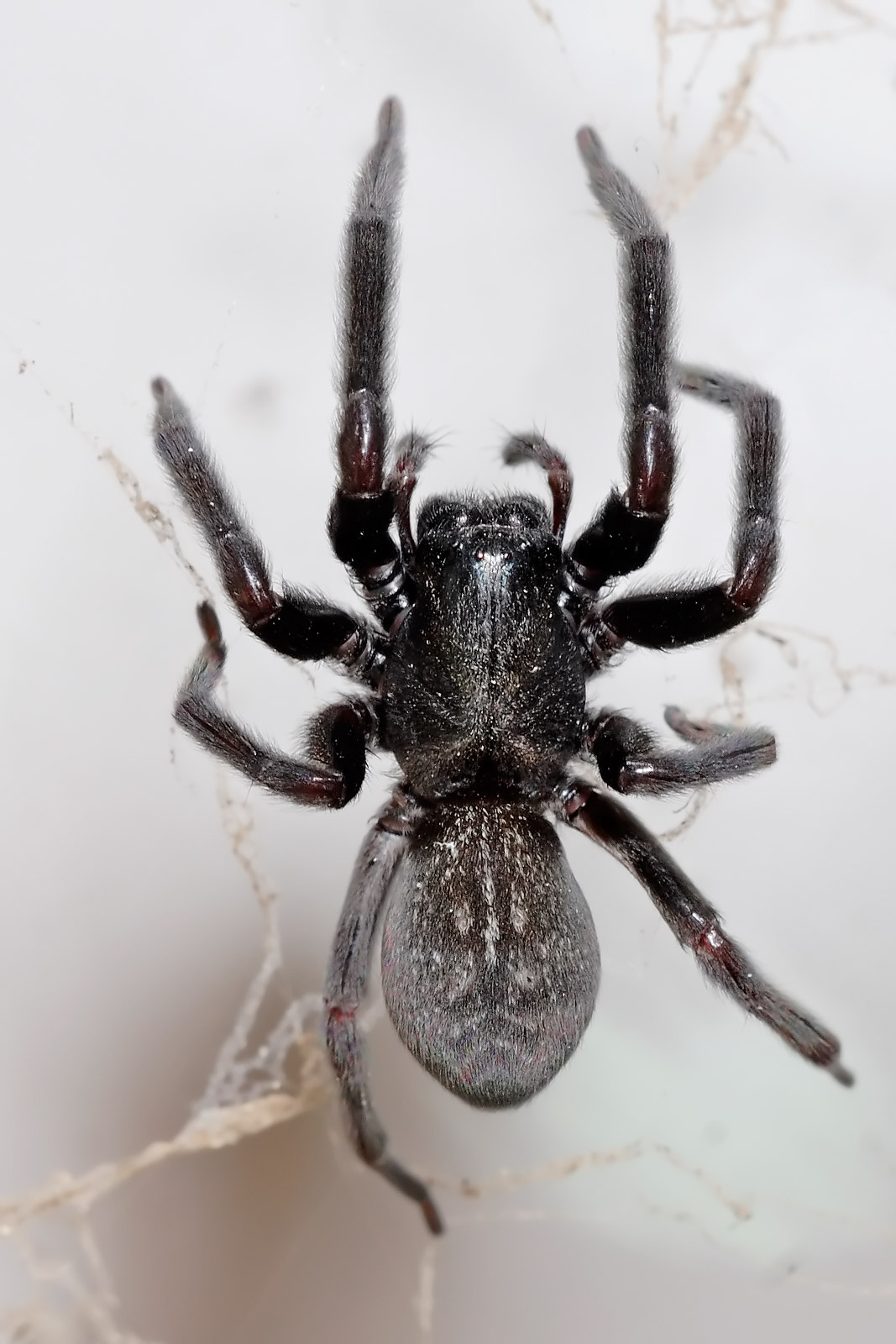
- Female
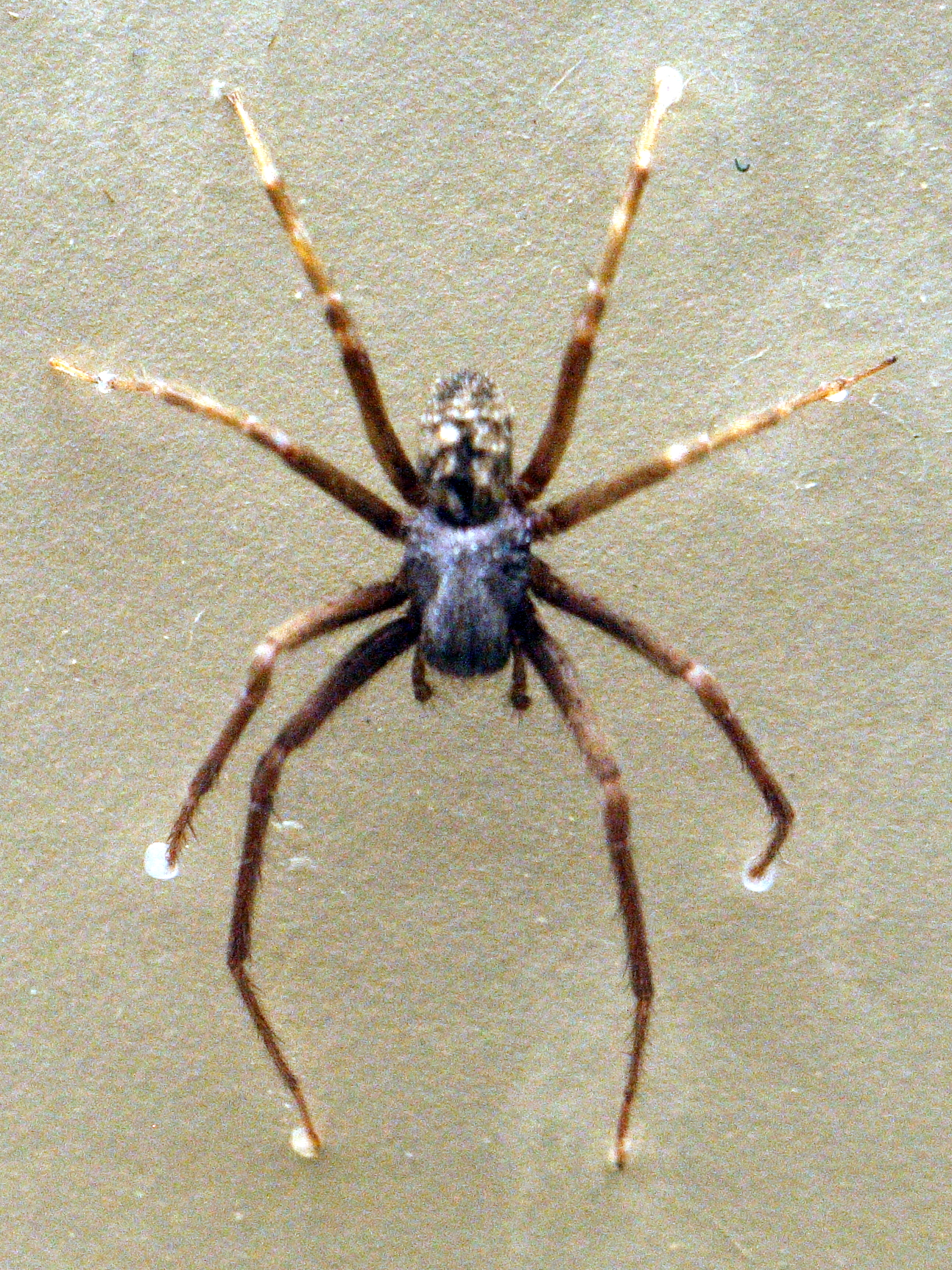
- Male

Scientific classification
- Kingdom: Animalia
- Phylum: Arthropoda
- Subphylum: Chelicerata
- Class: Arachnida
- Order: Araneae
- Infraorder: Araneomorphae
- Family: Desidae
- Genus: Badumna
- Species: B. insignis

Binomial name
- Badumna insignis L. Koch, 1872

Synonyms
- Amaurobius insignis L. Koch, 1872; Amaurobius robustus L. Koch, 1872; Amaurobius praecalvus Simon, 1906; Amaurobius australiensis Strand, 1913; Ixeuticus robustus (L. Koch, 1872); Badumna robusta (L. Koch, 1872)

= Black house spider =

Species of spider

The black house spider or common black spider (Badumna insignis) is a common species of cribellate Australian spider, introduced to New Zealand and Japan. A closely related species, Badumna longinqua, the grey house spider, has a similar distribution, but has also been introduced to the Americas.

Ludwig Carl Christian Koch described Badumna insignis in 1872.

== Description ==
B. insignis is a dark, robust spider. The female grows up to 18 mm, with a 30 mm leg span. As with most spiders, the males are smaller (10 mm) and have longer legs in relation to their body size. In both sexes, the carapace and legs are dark brown to black, and the abdomen is charcoal grey with a dorsal pattern of light markings (sometimes indistinct) and a dense covering of fine, velvety hair. B. longinqua is slightly smaller (14 mm) with a greyish carapace and black-brown legs.

== Habits, mating, and reproduction ==
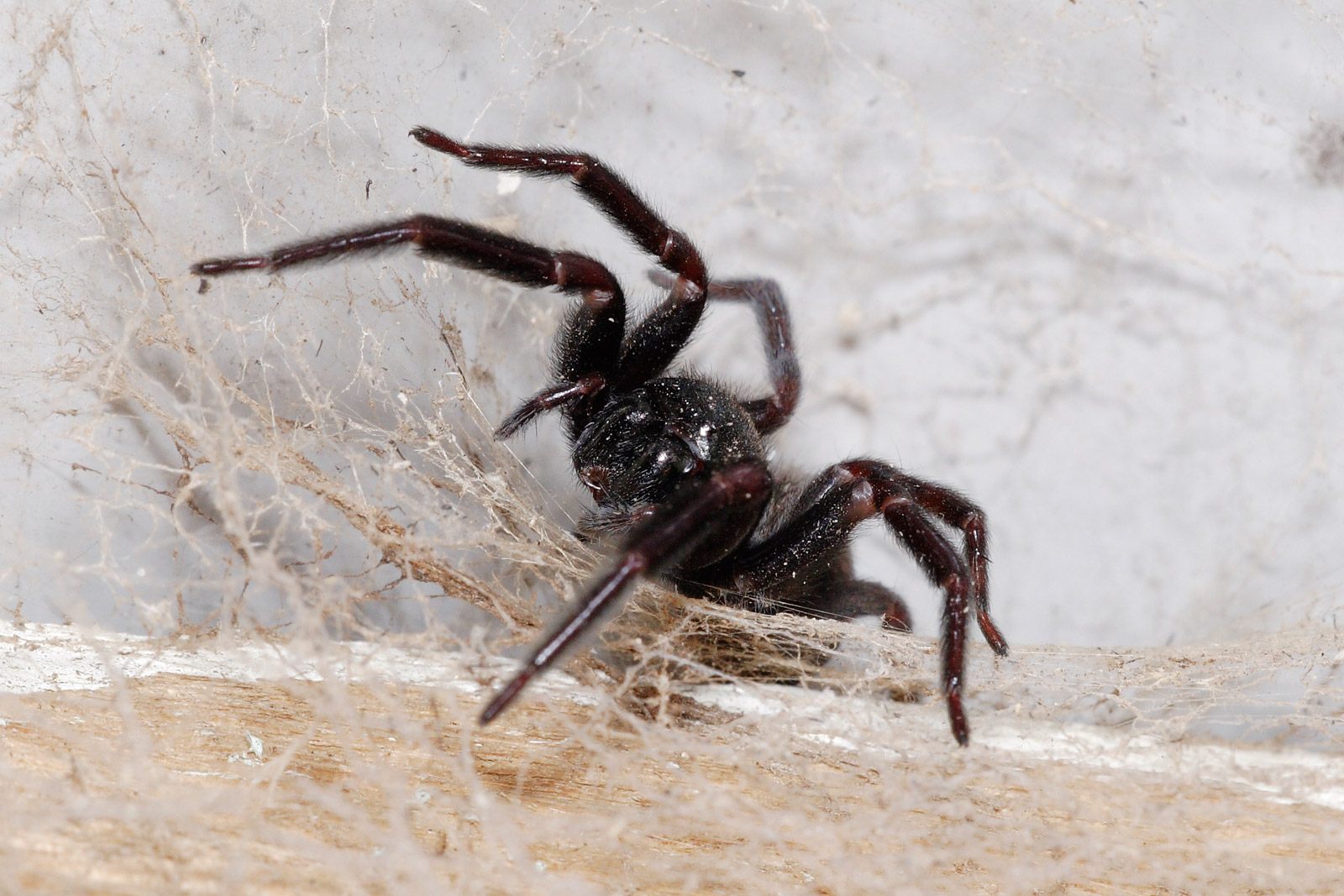
Black house spider in its web

The web of B. insignis is a messy-looking construct of irregular sail-like shapes. There is a funnel-shaped, silken retreat, usually in the middle or corner of the web, where the spider spends most of its time waiting for prey. The female spider never leaves the web unless forced to. They seem quite attached to their location, rarely changing the position of their webs and because of this, old webs can be quite messy, often with small objects or dust stuck in them. At night the spider comes out to repair and add to the web, often just adding new silk over the old. Males, when ready to mate, go in search of females. The male plucks the web of the female to attract her attention. Once the male has made sure that the female will be receptive, he will approach and inseminate her with his palps. They may then stay together for several days and may mate again several times.

The female constructs several white silk egg sacs, which are secured within the web retreat. The female stays with the eggs until they hatch. The spiderlings may then disperse or remain in the web of the mother for some time, catching the smaller prey that the larger spider would ignore.

Predators include the white-tailed spider, as well as parasitic wasps and flies.

== Bite ==
Black house spiders are venomous but are not considered dangerous. They are timid and bites from them are infrequent. The bite may be excruciatingly painful and cause local swelling. Symptoms such as nausea, vomiting, sweating, and dizziness are occasionally recorded. In a few cases, skin lesions (arachnogenic necrosis) have developed after multiple bites.

== Distribution and habitat ==
B. insignis is native to Australia and has been introduced to New Zealand and Japan. It is widely distributed throughout Australia and New Zealand. In their natural habitat, they are usually found on rough-barked trees, whereas inside buildings they are often found in corners, around windows and doorways, or where other light sources may attract prey insects. The related B. longinqua may be found in similar locations, but is more often found outdoors.
