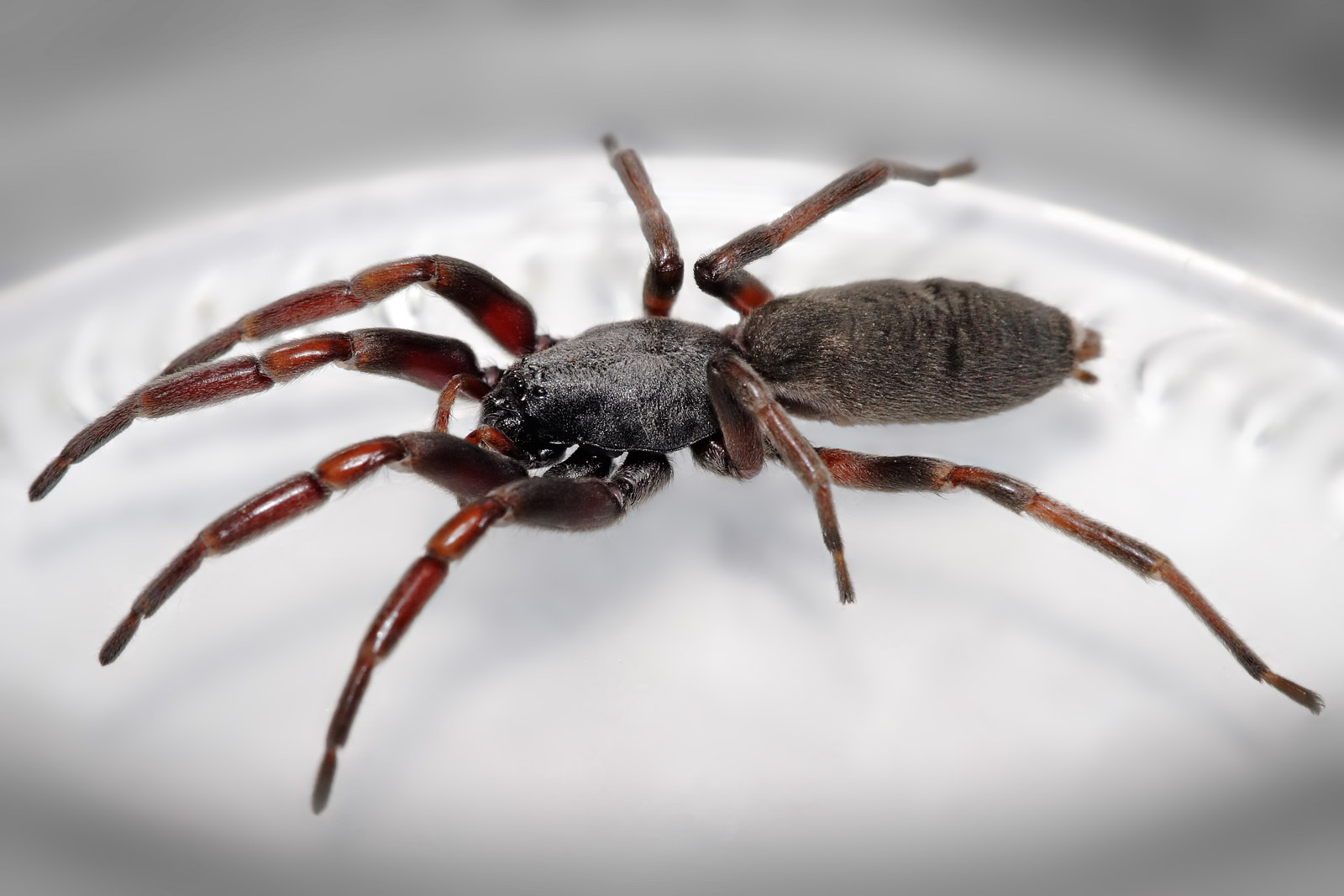
- Adult

Scientific classification
- Kingdom: Animalia
- Phylum: Arthropoda
- Subphylum: Chelicerata
- Class: Arachnida
- Order: Araneae
- Infraorder: Araneomorphae
- Family: Lamponidae
- Genus: Lampona
- Informal group: White-tailed spiders

Species
- Lampona cylindrata L. Koch, 1866; Lampona murina L. Koch, 1873

= White-tailed spider =

White-tailed spiders

Species of arachnid

White-tailed spider with egg sac

White-tailed spiders are spiders native to southern and eastern Australia, with the name referring to the whitish tips at the end of their abdomens. The body size is up to 18 mm, with a leg-span of 28 mm. Common species are Lampona cylindrata and Lampona murina. Both these species have been introduced into New Zealand.

White-tailed spiders are vagrant hunters that seek out and envenom prey rather than spinning a web to capture it; their preferred prey is other spiders.

They are reported to bite humans, with effects including a red mark, and local itchiness, swelling and pain. On rare occasions, bites can cause nausea, vomiting, malaise or headache. Although ulcers and necrosis have been attributed to the bites, a scientific study by Isbister and Gray (2003) showed they had other causes, mostly infections. A study of 130 white-tailed spider bites found no necrotic ulcers or confirmed infections.

== Taxonomy ==
Ludwig Carl Christian Koch described Lampona cylindrata in 1866 and Lampona murina in 1873. The name comes from the Latin lampo ("to shine"). The species name cylindrata refers to the cylindric body shape, while murinus means "mouse-gray" in Latin.

== Description ==
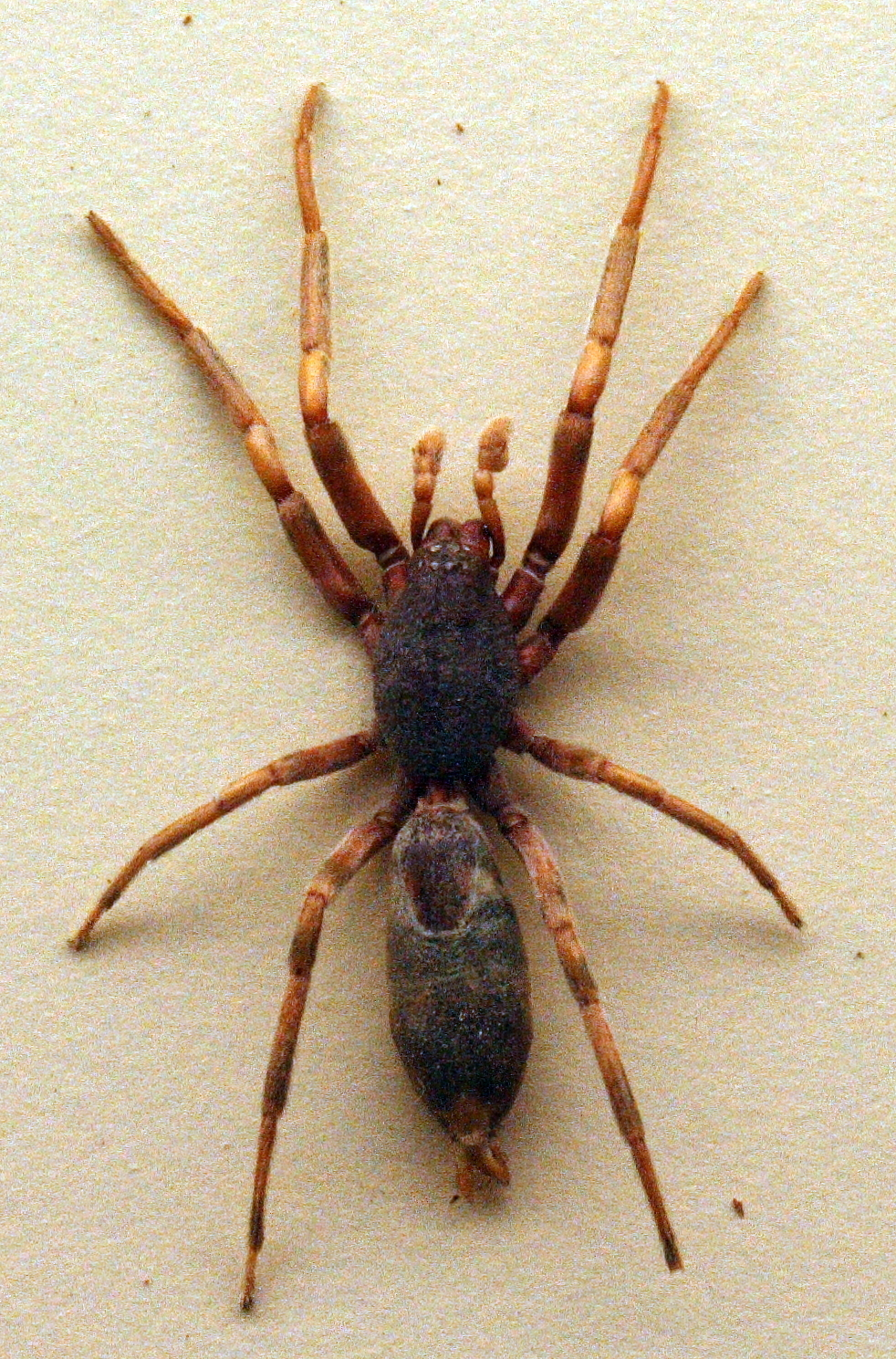
L. cylindrata male specimen on display in the Australian Museum

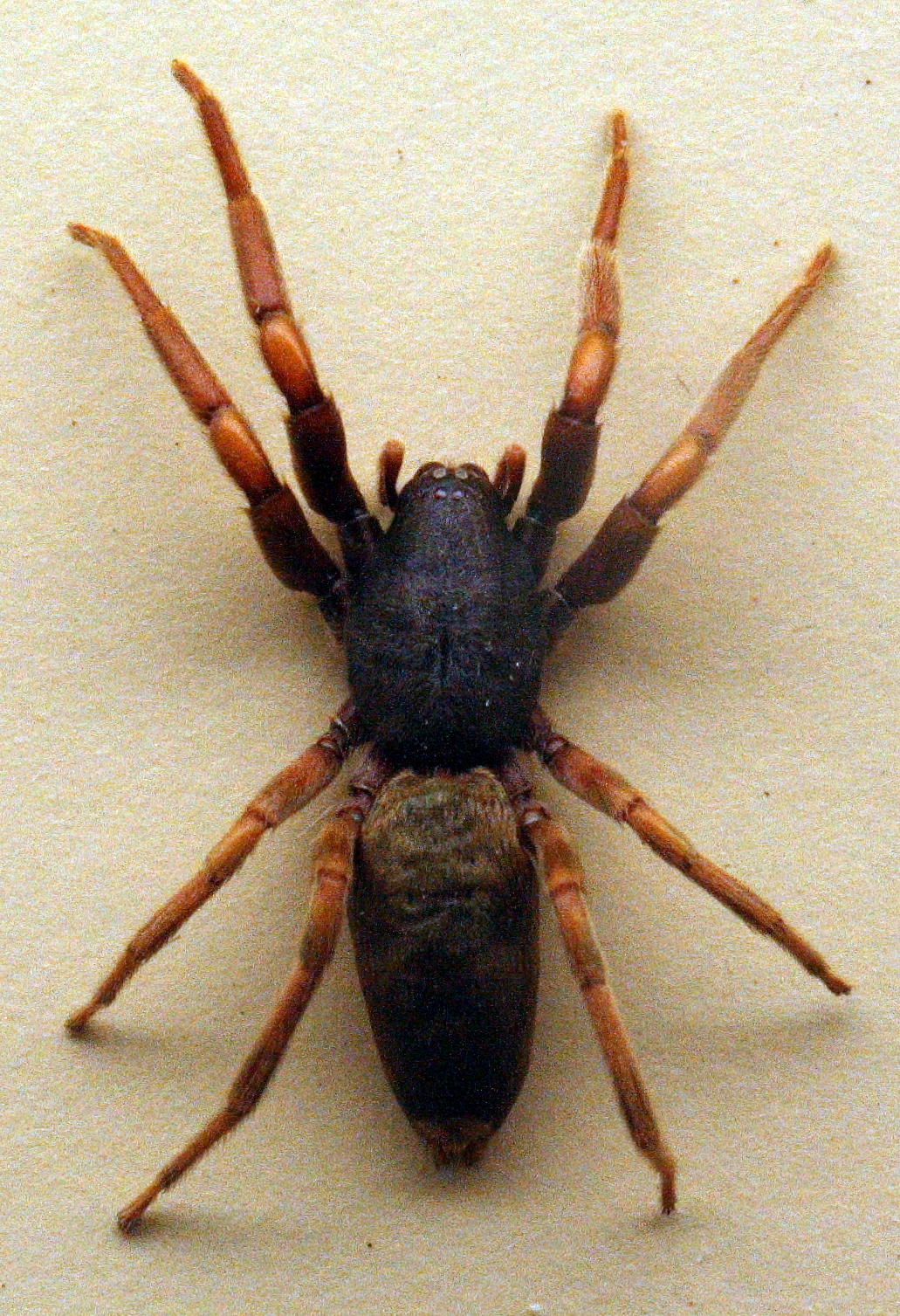
L. cylindrata female specimen on display in the Australian Museum

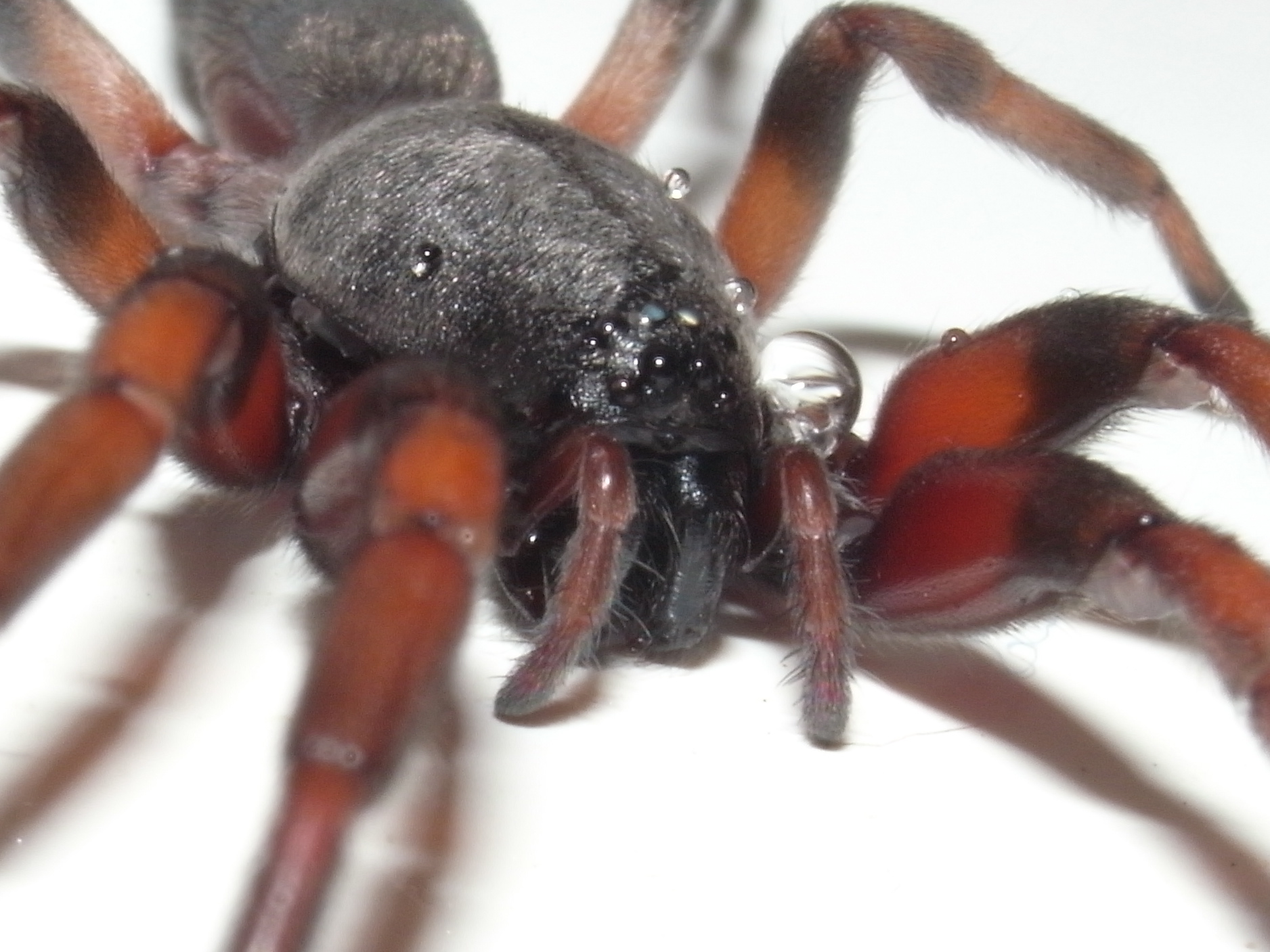
L. cylindrata – face detail with fangs

The two common species of white-tailed spiders are Lampona cylindrata and Lampona murina. They are similar in appearance; L. cylindrata is slightly larger with females being up to 18 mm long while males are up to 12 mm in body length. The legs span approximately 28 mm. The two species are not easily distinguished without microscopic examination. They are slender spiders with dark reddish to grey, cigar-shaped body and dark orange-brown banded legs. The grey abdomen has two pairs of faint white spots and—usually but not always—a distinct white spot at the tip just above the spinnerets.

The similarities have led people to think there is only one species of white-tailed spider. It is possible that not all white-tailed species have been identified. The descriptor, white tail, is applied to a variety of species of spiders for which a distal white mark on their abdomen is a distinctive feature; other markings disappear with moultings but the white tail remains to adulthood.

L. cylindrata lay pinkish eggs which are enclosed in a flattened silk capsule and are guarded by the female until they hatch.

== Distribution ==
Both species are native to Australia. Lampona cylindrata is present across south-east Queensland, New South Wales, Victoria, South Australia, Tasmania and Western Australia while Lampona murina is found in eastern Australia from north-east Queensland to Victoria. The spiders have been introduced in New Zealand with Lampona murina residing in the North Island for over a hundred years while Lampona cylindrata has become widespread through the South Island since 1980.

== Habitat and behaviour ==
They live in gardens and inside houses, beneath bark and rocks. They do not build webs. Most active at night, they hunt for other spiders. Their favoured prey is the black house spider (Badumna insignis) and the closely related brown house spider (Badumna longinqua), both of which, like the whitetail, are native to Australia but have been inadvertently introduced to New Zealand.

== Bites to humans ==
White-tailed spider bites may cause a small red or discoloured bump, similar to an insect bite, that burns or itches.

The issue of necrosis in some bite cases in published studies begins with a paper presented at the International Society on Toxinology World Congress held in Brisbane in 1982. Both the White-tailed spider and the wolf spider were considered as candidates for possibly causing suspected spider bite necrosis in Australia. In Brazil the recluse spider was identified as linked to necrosis.

Following this initial report, numerous other cases implicated white-tailed spiders in causing necrotic ulcers. All of these cases lacked a positively identified spider — or even a spider bite in some cases. Additionally, there had not been a case of arachnogenic necrosis reported in the two hundred years of European colonisation before these cases. Of the 130 cases of White-tailed spider bites studied by Isbister and Gray, more than 60% reported that the person had been bitten by spiders that had got into clothing, towels or beds.

Clinical toxicologist Geoffrey Isbister studied 130 cases of arachnologist-identified white-tailed spider bites, and found no necrosis or confirmed infections, concluding that such outcomes are very unlikely for a white-tailed spider bite. The major effects from a bite in this study were local (pain, a red mark, local swelling and itchiness); and rarely systemic (nausea, vomiting, malaise or headache). All these symptoms are generally mild and resolve over time.
