= Prionosternum =

Scientific classification
- Kingdom: Animalia
- Phylum: Arthropoda
- Subphylum: Chelicerata
- Class: Arachnida
- Order: Araneae
- Infraorder: Araneomorphae
- Family: Lamponidae
- Genus: Prionosternum; Dunn, 1951

Type species
- P. scutatum Dunn, 1951

Species
- P. nitidiceps (Simon, 1909) – Southern Australia, Tasmania; P. porongurup Platnick, 2000 – Australia (Western Australia); P. scutatum Dunn, 1951 – Australia (Western Australia)

Genus of spiders

Prionosternum is a genus of Australian white tailed spiders that was first described by R. A. Dunn in 1951. As of May 2019 it contains only three species: P. nitidiceps, P. porongurup, and P. scutatum. Originally placed with the ground spiders, it was moved to the Lamponidae in 2000.
