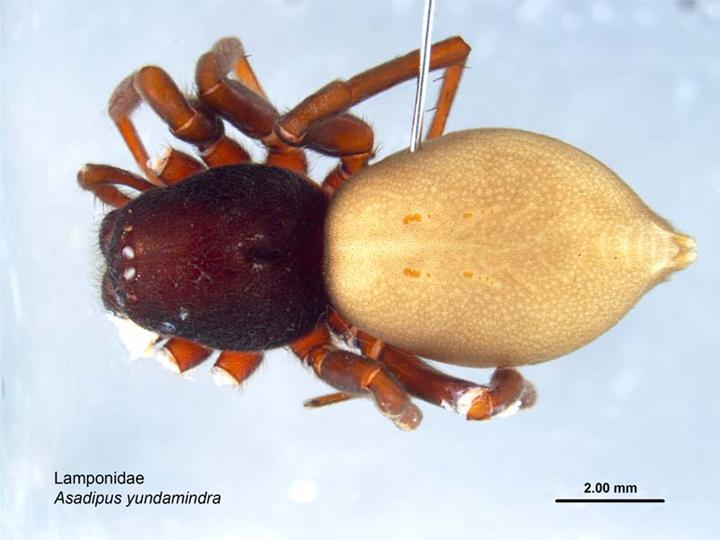
- A. yundamindra

Scientific classification
- Kingdom: Animalia
- Phylum: Arthropoda
- Subphylum: Chelicerata
- Class: Arachnida
- Order: Araneae
- Infraorder: Araneomorphae
- Family: Lamponidae
- Genus: Asadipus; Simon, 1897

Type species
- A. insolens (Simon, 1896)

Species
- 20, see text

= Asadipus =

Genus of spiders

Asadipus is a genus of Australian white tailed spiders that was first described by Eugène Louis Simon in 1897. Originally placed with the Corinnidae, it was moved to the Lamponidae in 2000.

== Species ==
As of May 2019 it contains twenty species:

- Asadipus areyonga Platnick, 2000 – Australia (Northern Territory, Queensland)
- Asadipus auld Platnick, 2000 – Australia (Western Australia, South Australia)
- Asadipus banjiwarn Platnick, 2000 – Australia (Western Australia)
- Asadipus baranar Platnick, 2000 – Australia (Western Australia)
- Asadipus barant Platnick, 2000 – Australia (Western Australia)
- Asadipus barlee Platnick, 2000 – Australia (Western Australia)
- Asadipus bucks Platnick, 2000 – Australia (South Australia, Victoria)
- Asadipus cape Platnick, 2000 – Australia (Western Australia)
- Asadipus croydon Platnick, 2000 – Australia (Queensland)
- Asadipus humptydoo Platnick, 2000 – Australia (Northern Territory)
- Asadipus insolens (Simon, 1896) (type) – Australia (Queensland)
- Asadipus julia Platnick, 2000 – Australia (Northern Territory, Queensland)
- Asadipus kunderang Platnick, 2000 – Australia
- Asadipus longforest Platnick, 2000 – Australia (South Australia, Victoria, Tasmania)
- Asadipus mountant Platnick, 2000 – Australia (Western Australia)
- Asadipus palmerston Platnick, 2000 – Australia (Northern Territory)
- Asadipus phaleratus (Simon, 1909) – Australia (Western Australia, South Australia, Queensland)
- Asadipus uphill Platnick, 2000 – Australia (Queensland)
- Asadipus woodleigh Platnick, 2000 – Australia (Western Australia)
- Asadipus yundamindra Platnick, 2000 – Australia (Western Australia)
