= Lamponega =

Scientific classification
- Kingdom: Animalia
- Phylum: Arthropoda
- Subphylum: Chelicerata
- Class: Arachnida
- Order: Araneae
- Infraorder: Araneomorphae
- Family: Lamponidae
- Genus: Lamponega; Platnick, 2000

Type species
- L. arcoona Platnick, 2000

Species
- L. arcoona Platnick, 2000 – Southern Australia; L. forceps Platnick, 2000 – Australia (Western Australia); L. serpentine Platnick, 2000 – Australia (South Australia)

Genus of spiders

Lamponega is a genus of Australian white tailed spiders that was first described by Norman I. Platnick in 2000. As of May 2019 it contains only three species: L. arcoona, L. forceps, and L. serpentine.
