= Lamponina =

Scientific classification
- Kingdom: Animalia
- Phylum: Arthropoda
- Subphylum: Chelicerata
- Class: Arachnida
- Order: Araneae
- Infraorder: Araneomorphae
- Family: Lamponidae
- Genus: Lamponina; Strand, 1913

Type species
- L. scutata (Strand, 1913)

Species
- 6, see text

Genus of spiders

Lamponina is a genus of Australian white tailed spiders that was first described by Embrik Strand in 1913.

== Species ==
As of May 2019 it contains six species:

- Lamponina asperrima (Hickman, 1950) – Australia (South Australia)
- Lamponina elongata Platnick, 2000 – Southern Australia
- Lamponina isa Platnick, 2000 – Australia (Northern Territory, Queensland)
- Lamponina kakadu Platnick, 2000 – Australia (Northern Territory)
- Lamponina loftia Platnick, 2000 – Australia (South Australia, Victoria)
- Lamponina scutata (Strand, 1913) (type) – Australia
