= Centrothele =

Scientific classification
- Kingdom: Animalia
- Phylum: Arthropoda
- Subphylum: Chelicerata
- Class: Arachnida
- Order: Araneae
- Infraorder: Araneomorphae
- Family: Lamponidae
- Genus: Centrothele; L. Koch, 1873

Type species
- C. lorata L. Koch, 1873

Species
- 10, see text

Genus of spiders

Centrothele is a genus of South Pacific white tailed spiders that was first described by Ludwig Carl Christian Koch in 1873. Originally placed with the Corinnidae, it was moved to the Lamponidae in 2000.

== Species ==
As of May 2019 it contains ten species found in Queensland, New South Wales, and one from New Guinea:

- Centrothele cardell Platnick, 2000 – Australia (Queensland)
- Centrothele coalston Platnick, 2000 – Australia (Queensland)
- Centrothele fisher Platnick, 2000 – Australia (Queensland)
- Centrothele gordon Platnick, 2000 – Australia (Queensland, New South Wales)
- Centrothele kuranda Platnick, 2000 – Australia (Queensland)
- Centrothele lorata L. Koch, 1873 (type) – Australia (Queensland)
- Centrothele mossman Platnick, 2000 – Australia (Queensland)
- Centrothele mutica (Simon, 1897) – Australia (Queensland, New South Wales), New Guinea
- Centrothele nardi Platnick, 2000 – Australia (Queensland, New South Wales)
- Centrothele spurgeon Platnick, 2000 – Australia (Queensland)
