= Notsodipus =

Scientific classification
- Kingdom: Animalia
- Phylum: Arthropoda
- Subphylum: Chelicerata
- Class: Arachnida
- Order: Araneae
- Infraorder: Araneomorphae
- Family: Lamponidae
- Genus: Notsodipus; Platnick, 2000

Type species
- N. dalby Platnick, 2000

Species
- 18, see text

Genus of spiders

Notsodipus is a genus of Australian white tailed spiders that was first described by Norman I. Platnick in 2000.

== Species ==
As of May 2019 it contains eighteen species:

- Notsodipus barlee Platnick, 2000 – Australia (Western Australia)
- Notsodipus bidgemia Platnick, 2000 – Australia (Western Australia)
- Notsodipus blackall Platnick, 2000 – Australia (Queensland)
- Notsodipus broadwater Platnick, 2000 – Australia (Queensland)
- Notsodipus capensis Platnick, 2000 – Australia (Western Australia)
- Notsodipus dalby Platnick, 2000 (type) – Eastern Australia
- Notsodipus domain Platnick, 2000 – Southern Australia, Tasmania
- Notsodipus innot Platnick, 2000 – Australia (Queensland)
- Notsodipus keilira Platnick, 2000 – Australia (South Australia, Victoria)
- Notsodipus linnaei Platnick & Dupérré, 2008 – Australia (Western Australia)
- Notsodipus magdala Platnick, 2000 – Australia (Northern Territory)
- Notsodipus marun Platnick, 2000 – Australia (Western Australia, Northern Territory, Queensland)
- Notsodipus meedo Platnick, 2000 – Australia (Western Australia)
- Notsodipus muckera Platnick, 2000 – Southern Australia
- Notsodipus quobba Platnick, 2000 – Australia (Western Australia)
- Notsodipus renmark Platnick, 2000 – Australia (South Australia, Victoria)
- Notsodipus upstart Platnick, 2000 – Australia (Queensland)
- Notsodipus visio Platnick, 2000 – Australia (Western Australia, South Australia)
