= Graycassis =

Scientific classification
- Kingdom: Animalia
- Phylum: Arthropoda
- Subphylum: Chelicerata
- Class: Arachnida
- Order: Araneae
- Infraorder: Araneomorphae
- Family: Lamponidae
- Genus: Graycassis; Platnick, 2000

Type species
- G. marengo Platnick, 2000

Species
- 10, see text

Genus of spiders

Graycassis is a genus of Australian white tailed spiders that was first described by Norman I. Platnick in 2000.

== Species ==
As of May 2019 it contains ten species:

- Graycassis barrington Platnick, 2000 – Australia (New South Wales)
- Graycassis boss Platnick, 2000 – Australia (New South Wales)
- Graycassis bruxner Platnick, 2000 – Australia (New South Wales)
- Graycassis bulga Platnick, 2000 – Australia (New South Wales)
- Graycassis chichester Platnick, 2000 – Australia (Queensland, New South Wales)
- Graycassis dorrigo Platnick, 2000 – Australia (New South Wales)
- Graycassis enfield Platnick, 2000 – Australia (New South Wales)
- Graycassis marengo Platnick, 2000 (type) – Australia (New South Wales)
- Graycassis scrub Platnick, 2000 – Australia (New South Wales)
- Graycassis styx Platnick, 2000 – Australia (New South Wales)
