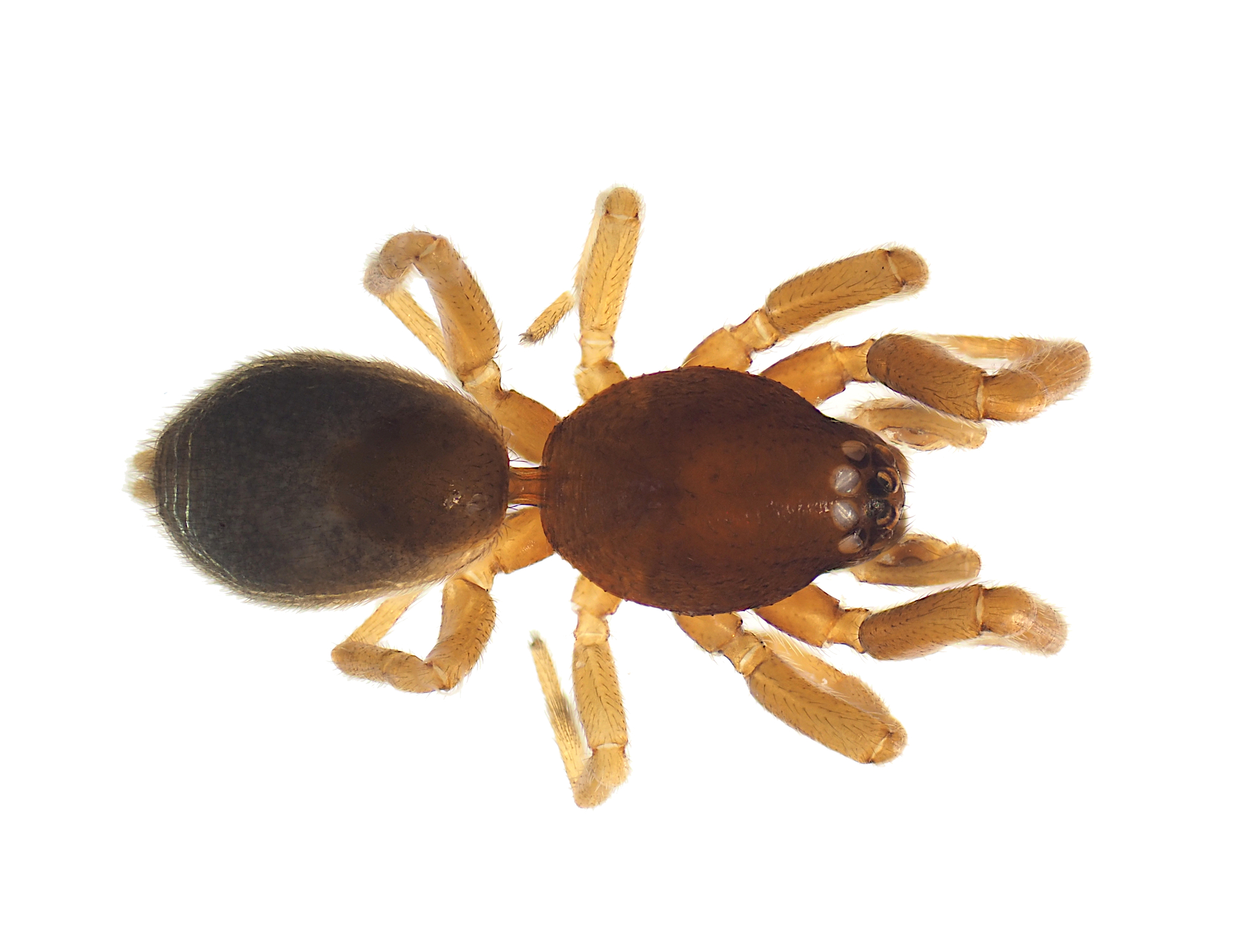
- Lamponella beaury

Scientific classification
- Kingdom: Animalia
- Phylum: Arthropoda
- Subphylum: Chelicerata
- Class: Arachnida
- Order: Araneae
- Infraorder: Araneomorphae
- Family: Lamponidae
- Genus: Lamponella; Platnick, 2000

Type species
- L. ainslie Platnick, 2000

Species
- 10, see text

= Lamponella =

Genus of spiders

Lamponella is a genus of Australian white tailed spiders that was first described by Norman I. Platnick in 2000.

== Species ==
As of May 2019, it contains ten species:

- Lamponella ainslie Platnick, 2000 (type) – Southern Australia, Tasmania
- Lamponella beaury Platnick, 2000 – Australia (Queensland, New South Wales)
- Lamponella brookfield Platnick, 2000 – Australia (Queensland)
- Lamponella homevale Platnick, 2000 – Australia (Queensland)
- Lamponella kanangra Platnick, 2000 – Australia (New South Wales)
- Lamponella kimba Platnick, 2000 – Australia (Western Australia, South Australia)
- Lamponella kroombit Platnick, 2000 – Australia (Queensland)
- Lamponella taroom Platnick, 2000 – Australia (Queensland)
- Lamponella wombat Platnick, 2000 – Australian Capital Territory
- Lamponella wyandotte Platnick, 2000 – Australia (Queensland)
