= Lamponata =

Scientific classification
- Kingdom: Animalia
- Phylum: Arthropoda
- Subphylum: Chelicerata
- Class: Arachnida
- Order: Araneae
- Infraorder: Araneomorphae
- Family: Lamponidae
- Genus: Lamponata; Platnick, 2000
- Species: L. daviesae

Binomial name
- Lamponata daviesae Platnick, 2000

Genus of spiders

Lamponata is a monotypic genus of Australian white tailed spiders containing the single species, Lamponata daviesae. It was first described by Norman I. Platnick in 2000, and has only been found in Australia.
