= Platylampona =

Scientific classification
- Kingdom: Animalia
- Phylum: Arthropoda
- Subphylum: Chelicerata
- Class: Arachnida
- Order: Araneae
- Infraorder: Araneomorphae
- Family: Lamponidae
- Genus: Platylampona; Platnick, 2004
- Species: P. mazeppa

Binomial name
- Platylampona mazeppa Platnick, 2004

Genus of spiders

Platylampona is a monotypic genus of Australian white tailed spiders containing the single species, Platylampona mazeppa. It was first described by Norman I. Platnick in 2004, and has only been found in Australia.
