= Lamponova =

Scientific classification
- Kingdom: Animalia
- Phylum: Arthropoda
- Subphylum: Chelicerata
- Class: Arachnida
- Order: Araneae
- Infraorder: Araneomorphae
- Family: Lamponidae
- Genus: Lamponova; Platnick, 2000
- Species: L. wau

Binomial name
- Lamponova wau Platnick, 2000

Genus of spiders

Lamponova is a monotypic genus of South Pacific white tailed spiders containing the single species, Lamponova wau. It was first described by Norman I. Platnick in 2000, and has only been found in Papua New Guinea and the Australian states of New South Wales and Victoria.
