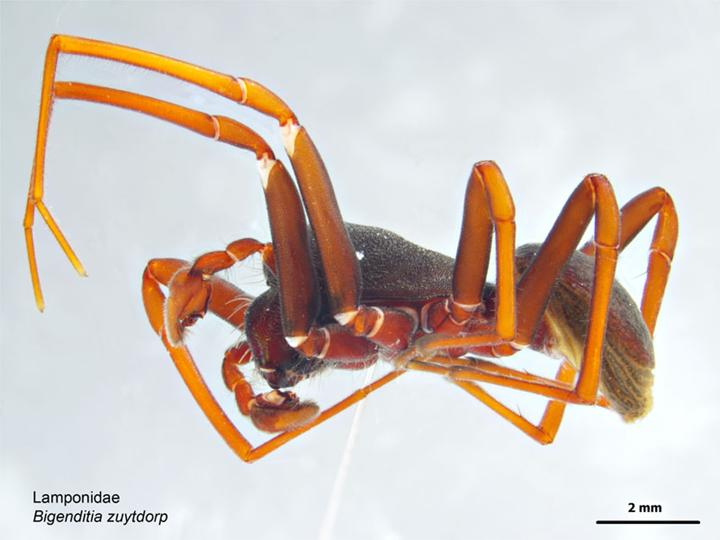
- B. zuytdorp

Scientific classification
- Kingdom: Animalia
- Phylum: Arthropoda
- Subphylum: Chelicerata
- Class: Arachnida
- Order: Araneae
- Infraorder: Araneomorphae
- Family: Lamponidae
- Genus: Bigenditia; Platnick, 2000

Type species
- B. zuytdorp Platnick, 2000

Species
- B. millawa Platnick, 2000 – Eastern Australia; B. zuytdorp Platnick, 2000 – Australia (Western Australia, South Australia)

= Bigenditia =

Genus of spiders

Bigenditia is a genus of Australian white tailed spiders that was first described by Norman I. Platnick in 2000. As of May 2019 it contains only two species: B. millawa and B. zuytdorp.
