= Paralampona =

Scientific classification
- Kingdom: Animalia
- Phylum: Arthropoda
- Subphylum: Chelicerata
- Class: Arachnida
- Order: Araneae
- Infraorder: Araneomorphae
- Family: Lamponidae
- Genus: Paralampona; Platnick, 2000

Type species
- P. domain Platnick, 2000

Species
- 8, see text

Genus of spiders

Paralampona is a genus of Australian white tailed spiders that was first described by Norman I. Platnick in 2000.

== Species ==
As of May 2019 it contains eight species:

- Paralampona aurumagua Platnick, 2000 – Australia (Queensland)
- Paralampona cobon Platnick, 2000 – Australia (Victoria)
- Paralampona domain Platnick, 2000 (type) – Southeastern Australia, Tasmania
- Paralampona kiola Platnick, 2000 – Australia (New South Wales, Australian Capital Territory)
- Paralampona marangaroo Platnick, 2000 – Australia (Western Australia)
- Paralampona renmark Platnick, 2000 – Australia (South Australia, New South Wales)
- Paralampona sherlock Platnick, 2000 – Southeastern Australia
- Paralampona wogwog Platnick, 2000 – Australia (New South Wales)
