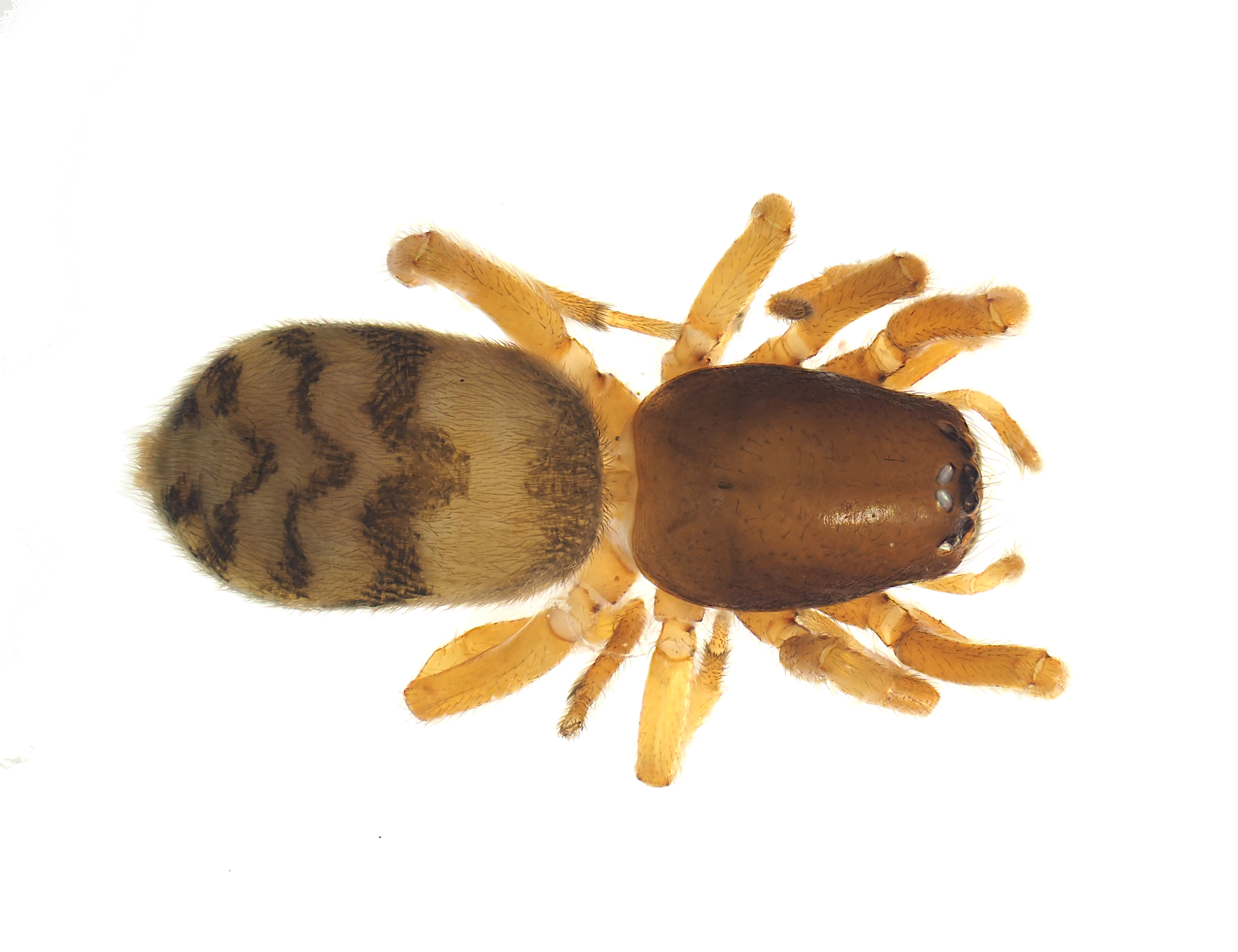
- Pseudolampona taroom

Scientific classification
- Kingdom: Animalia
- Phylum: Arthropoda
- Subphylum: Chelicerata
- Class: Arachnida
- Order: Araneae
- Infraorder: Araneomorphae
- Family: Lamponidae
- Genus: Pseudolampona; Platnick, 2000

Type species
- P. warrandyte Platnick, 2000

Species
- 12, see text

= Pseudolampona =

Genus of spiders

Pseudolampona is a genus of Australian white tailed spiders that was first described by Norman I. Platnick in 2000.

== Species ==
As of May 2019 it contains twelve species:

- Pseudolampona binnowee Platnick, 2000 – Australia (New South Wales)
- Pseudolampona boree Platnick, 2000 – Southern Australia
- Pseudolampona emmett Platnick, 2000 – Australia (Queensland)
- Pseudolampona glenmore Platnick, 2000 – Australia (Queensland)
- Pseudolampona jarrahdale Platnick, 2000 – Australia (Western Australia)
- Pseudolampona kroombit Platnick, 2000 – Australia (Queensland)
- Pseudolampona marun Platnick, 2000 – Australia (Western Australia)
- Pseudolampona spurgeon Platnick, 2000 – Australia (Queensland)
- Pseudolampona taroom Platnick, 2000 – Australia (Queensland, New South Wales)
- Pseudolampona warrandyte Platnick, 2000 (type) – Southeastern Australia
- Pseudolampona woodman Platnick, 2000 – Australia (Western Australia)
- Pseudolampona wyandotte Platnick, 2000 – Australia (Queensland)
