= Lamponusa =

Scientific classification
- Kingdom: Animalia
- Phylum: Arthropoda
- Subphylum: Chelicerata
- Class: Arachnida
- Order: Araneae
- Infraorder: Araneomorphae
- Family: Lamponidae
- Genus: Lamponusa; Platnick, 2000
- Species: L. gleneagle

Binomial name
- Lamponusa gleneagle Platnick, 2000

Genus of spiders

Lamponusa is a monotypic genus of Australian white tailed spiders containing the single species, Lamponusa gleneagle. It was first described by Norman I. Platnick in 2000, and has only been found in Australia.
