= Centrocalia =

Scientific classification
- Kingdom: Animalia
- Phylum: Arthropoda
- Subphylum: Chelicerata
- Class: Arachnida
- Order: Araneae
- Infraorder: Araneomorphae
- Family: Lamponidae
- Genus: Centrocalia; Platnick, 2000

Type species
- C. chazeaui Platnick, 2000

Species
- C. chazeaui Platnick, 2000 – New Caledonia; C. lifoui (Berland, 1929) – New Caledonia, Loyalty Is.; C. ningua Platnick, 2000 – New Caledonia

Genus of spiders

Centrocalia is a genus of South Pacific white tailed spiders that was first described by Norman I. Platnick in 2000. As of May 2019 it contains only three species, all found in New Caledonia: C. chazeaui, C. lifoui, and C. ningua.
