= Centroina =

Scientific classification
- Kingdom: Animalia
- Phylum: Arthropoda
- Subphylum: Chelicerata
- Class: Arachnida
- Order: Araneae
- Infraorder: Araneomorphae
- Family: Lamponidae
- Genus: Centroina; Platnick, 2002

Type species
- C. keira (Platnick, 2000)

Species
- 11, see text

Genus of spiders

Centroina is a genus of Australian white tailed spiders that was first described by Norman I. Platnick in 2000.

== Species ==
As of May 2019 it contains eleven species:

- Centroina blundells (Platnick, 2000) – Australian Capital Territory
- Centroina bondi (Platnick, 2000) – Australian Capital Territory, Victoria
- Centroina dorrigo (Platnick, 2000) – Australia (New South Wales)
- Centroina enfield (Platnick, 2000) – Australia (New South Wales)
- Centroina keira (Platnick, 2000) (type) – Australia (New South Wales)
- Centroina kota (Platnick, 2000) – Australia (New South Wales)
- Centroina lewis (Platnick, 2000) – Australia (Queensland)
- Centroina macedon (Platnick, 2000) – Australia (New South Wales, Victoria)
- Centroina sawpit (Platnick, 2000) – Australia (New South Wales, Victoria)
- Centroina sherbrook (Platnick, 2000) – Australia (Victoria)
- Centroina whian (Platnick, 2000) – Australia (New South Wales)
