= Longepi =

Scientific classification
- Kingdom: Animalia
- Phylum: Arthropoda
- Subphylum: Chelicerata
- Class: Arachnida
- Order: Araneae
- Infraorder: Araneomorphae
- Family: Lamponidae
- Genus: Longepi; Platnick, 2000

Type species
- L. boyd Platnick, 2000

Species
- 8, see text

Genus of spiders

Longepi is a genus of Australian white tailed spiders that was first described by Norman I. Platnick in 2000.

== Species ==
As of May 2019 it contains eight species:

- Longepi barmah Platnick, 2000 – Eastern Australia
- Longepi bondi Platnick, 2000 – Australia (New South Wales, Victoria)
- Longepi boyd Platnick, 2000 (type) – Australia (New South Wales, Australian Capital Territory)
- Longepi canungra Platnick, 2000 – Australia (Queensland)
- Longepi cobon Platnick, 2000 – Australia (Victoria)
- Longepi durin Platnick, 2000 – Australia (Western Australia)
- Longepi tarra Platnick, 2000 – Australia (Victoria)
- Longepi woodman Platnick, 2000 – Southern Australia
