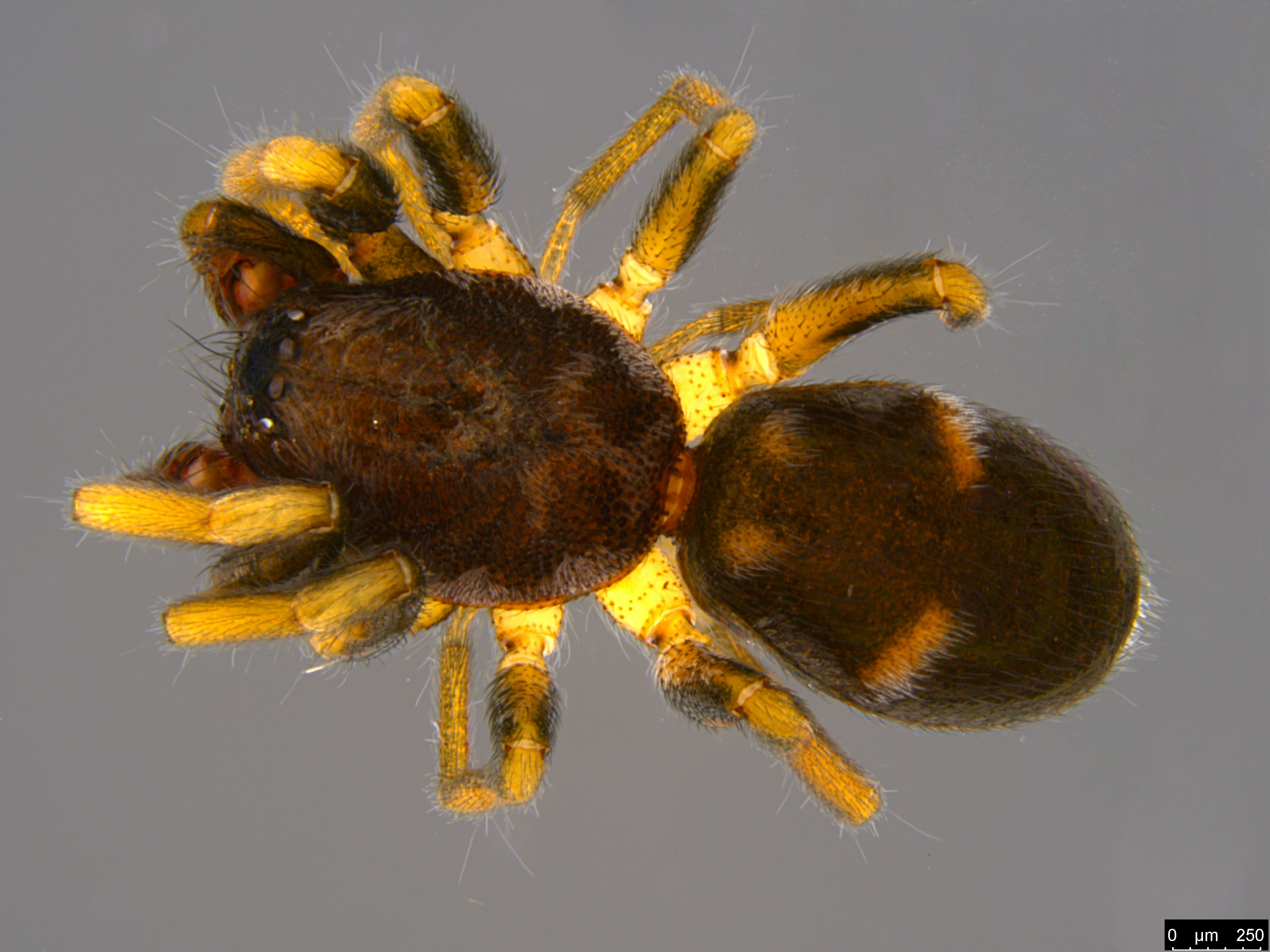
- Queenvic piccadilly

Scientific classification
- Kingdom: Animalia
- Phylum: Arthropoda
- Subphylum: Chelicerata
- Class: Arachnida
- Order: Araneae
- Infraorder: Araneomorphae
- Family: Lamponidae
- Genus: Queenvic; Platnick, 2000

Type species
- Q. mackay Platnick, 2000

Species
- 4, see text

= Queenvic =

Genus of spiders

Queenvic is a genus of Australian white tailed spiders that was first described by Norman I. Platnick in 2000.

== Species ==
As of May 2019 it contains four species:

- Queenvic goanna Platnick, 2000 – Australia (Queensland, New South Wales)
- Queenvic kelty Platnick, 2000 – Australia (South Australia, Victoria)
- Queenvic mackay Platnick, 2000 (type) – Eastern Australia
- Queenvic piccadilly Platnick, 2000 – Southeastern Australia
