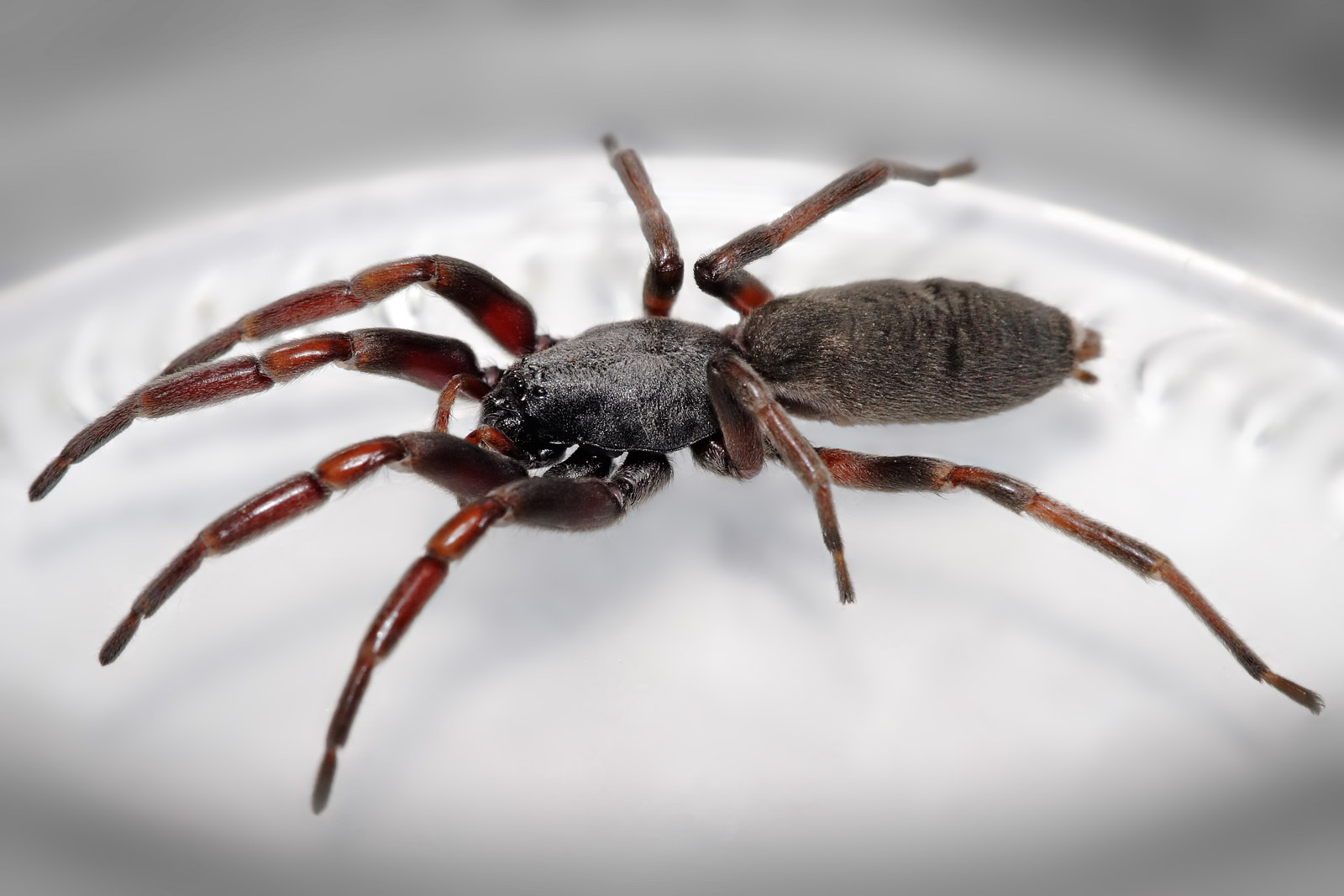
- Lampona or Lamponina species

Scientific classification
- Kingdom: Animalia
- Phylum: Arthropoda
- Subphylum: Chelicerata
- Class: Arachnida
- Order: Araneae
- Infraorder: Araneomorphae
- Family: Lamponidae
- Genus: Lampona; Thorell, 1869

Type species
- L. cylindrata (L. Koch, 1866)

Species
- 57, see text

= Lampona =

Genus of spiders

Lampona is a genus of South Pacific spiders in the family Lamponidae that was first described by Tamerlan Thorell in 1869. At least two species have a whitish tip to the abdomen and are known as "white-tailed spiders". Both hunt other spiders and have been introduced to New Zealand. The name is derived from the Middle English laumpe, meaning "light" or "fire".

== Species ==
As of May 2019 it contains fifty-seven species native to Australia and New Guinea:

- L. airlie Platnick, 2000 – Australia (Queensland)
- L. allyn Platnick, 2000 – Australia (New South Wales)
- L. ampeinna Platnick, 2000 – Australia (Western Australia, central Australia)
- L. barrow Platnick, 2000 – Australia (Western Australia)
- L. braemar Platnick, 2000 – Eastern Australia, Tasmania
- L. brevipes L. Koch, 1872 – Australia (Western Australia)
- L. bunya Platnick, 2000 – Australia (Queensland)
- L. carlisle Platnick, 2000 – Australia (Queensland)
- L. chalmers Platnick, 2000 – Australia (Queensland)
- L. chinghee Platnick, 2000 – Australia (Queensland, New South Wales)
- L. cohuna Platnick, 2000 – Australia (South Australia, Victoria)
- L. cudgen Platnick, 2000 – Australia (Queensland, New South Wales, Victoria)
- L. cumberland Platnick, 2000 – Australia (Victoria)
- L. cylindrata (L. Koch, 1866) (type) – Australia, Tasmania, New Zealand
- L. danggali Platnick, 2000 – Central, Eastern Australia
- L. davies Platnick, 2000 – Australia (Queensland)
- L. dwellingup Platnick, 2000 – Australia (Western Australia)
- L. eba Platnick, 2000 – Australia (South Australia)
- L. ewens Platnick, 2000 – Australia (South Australia, Tasmania)
- L. fife Platnick, 2000 – Australia (New South Wales, Victoria)
- L. finke Platnick, 2000 – Australia (Northern Territory, South Australia)
- L. finnigan Platnick, 2000 – Australia (Queensland)
- L. flavipes L. Koch, 1872 – Central, Eastern Australia
- L. foliifera Simon, 1908 – Australia (Western Australia, central Australia)
- L. garnet Platnick, 2000 – Australia (Queensland)
- L. gilles Platnick, 2000 – Australia (South Australia)
- L. gosford Platnick, 2000 – Australia (New South Wales, Victoria)
- L. hickmani Platnick, 2000 – Australia (Tasmania)
- L. hirsti Platnick, 2000 – Australia (South Australia)
- L. kapalga Platnick, 2000 – Australia (Northern Territory, Queensland)
- L. kirrama Platnick, 2000 – Australia (Queensland)
- L. lamington Platnick, 2000 – Australia (Queensland)
- L. lomond Platnick, 2000 – Southeastern Australia, Tasmania
- L. macilenta L. Koch, 1873 – Southern Australia
- L. mildura Platnick, 2000 – Australia (New South Wales, Victoria)
- L. molloy Platnick, 2000 – Australia (Queensland)
- L. monteithi Platnick, 2000 – Australia (Queensland)
- L. moorilyanna Platnick, 2000 – Australia (Queensland, South Australia)
- L. murina L. Koch, 1873 – Eastern Australia, New Zealand
- L. olga Platnick, 2000 – Australia (Northern Territory)
- L. ooldea Platnick, 2000 – Australia (South Australia, Victoria)
- L. papua Platnick, 2000 – New Guinea
- L. punctigera Simon, 1908 – Southern Australia
- L. pusilla L. Koch, 1873 – Eastern Australia
- L. quinqueplagiata Simon, 1908 – Australia (Western Australia)
- L. ruida L. Koch, 1873 – Eastern Australia, Tasmania
- L. russell Platnick, 2000 – Australia (Queensland)
- L. spec Platnick, 2000 – Australia (Queensland)
- L. superbus Platnick, 2000 – Australia (Queensland)
- L. talbingo Platnick, 2000 – Southeastern Australia
- L. taroom Platnick, 2000 – Australia (Queensland)
- L. terrors Platnick, 2000 – Australia (Queensland)
- L. torbay Platnick, 2000 – Australia (Western Australia)
- L. tulley Platnick, 2000 – Australia (Queensland)
- L. walsh Platnick, 2000 – Australia (Western Australia)
- L. whaleback Platnick, 2000 – Australia (Western Australia)
- L. yanchep Platnick, 2000 – Australia (Western Australia)
