= List of spiders of New Zealand =

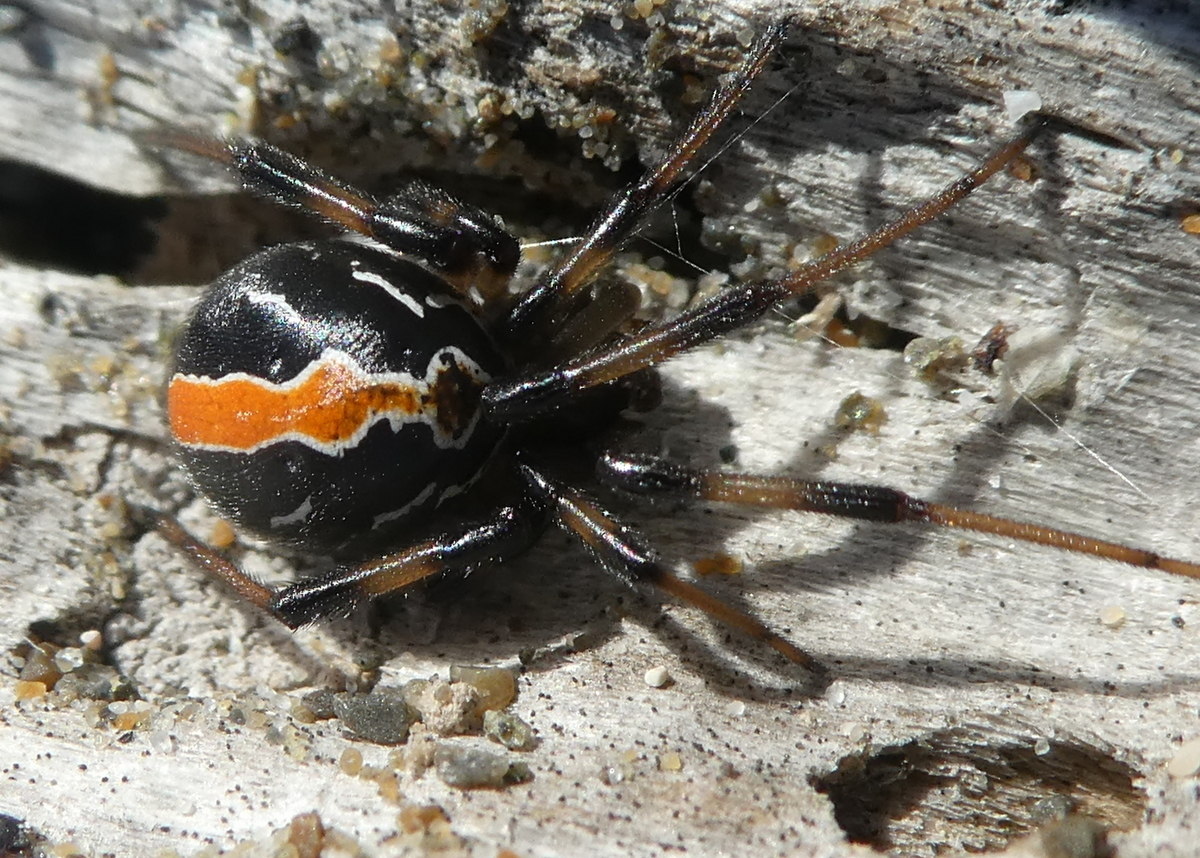
Latrodectus katipo

This is a list of all species of spiders that are known to occur in New Zealand, including its subantarctic islands. The list contains 1,151 species as of July 2025.

== Mygalomorphae ==
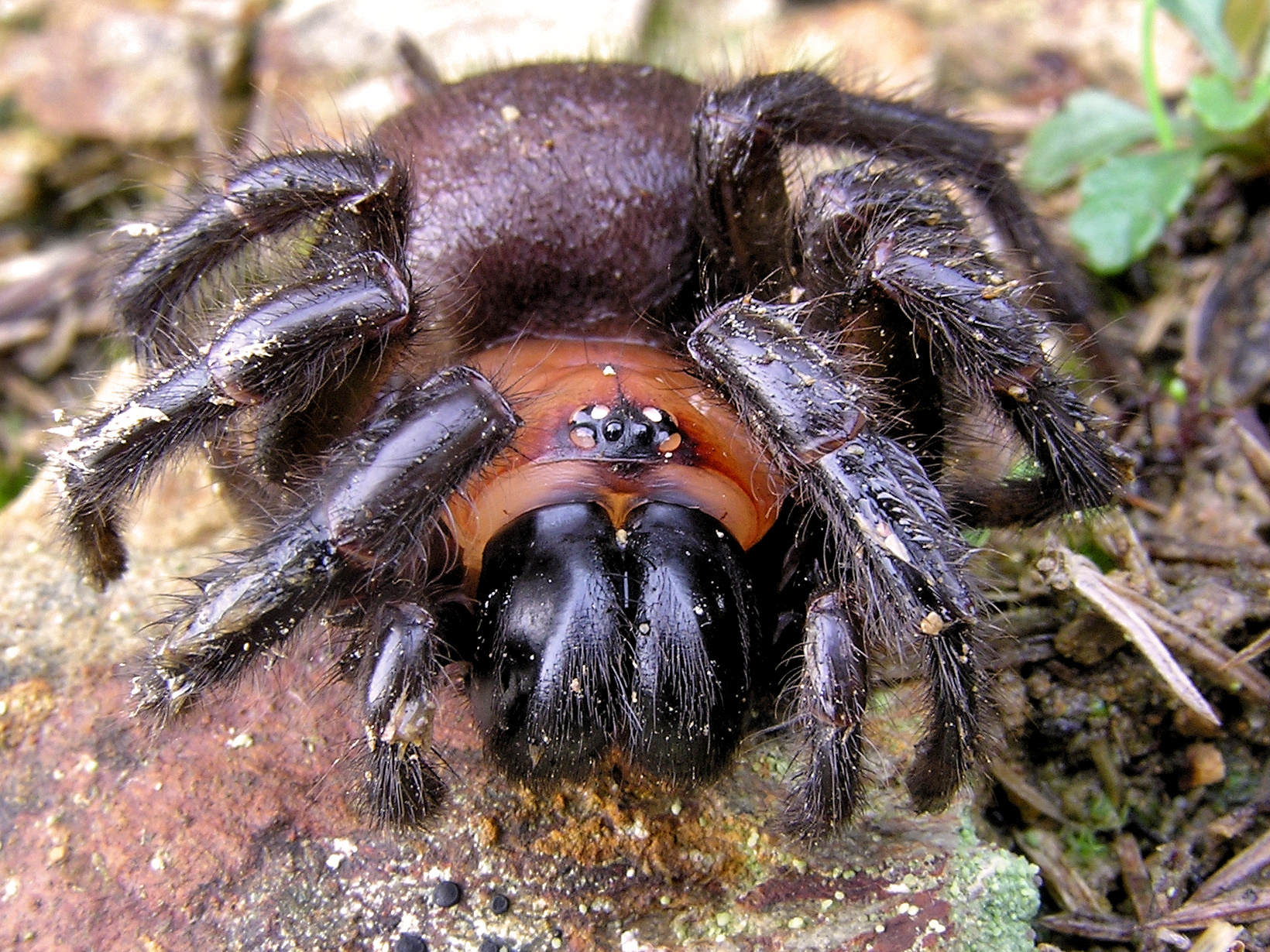
Porrhothele antipodiana

=== Porrhothelidae ===
- Porrhothele antipodiana (Walckenaer, 1837)
- Porrhothele blanda Forster, 1968
- Porrhothele moana Forster, 1968
- Porrhothele modesta Forster, 1968
- Porrhothele quadrigyna Forster, 1968
- Porrhothele peninsularis Thompson & Sirvid, 2026

=== Hexathelidae ===
- Hexathele cantuaria Forster, 1968
- Hexathele cavernicola Forster, 1968
- Hexathele exemplar Parrott, 1960
- Hexathele hochstetteri Ausserer, 1871
- Hexathele huka Forster, 1968
- Hexathele huttoni Hogg, 1908
- Hexathele kohua Forster, 1968
- Hexathele maitaia Forster, 1968
- Hexathele nigra Forster, 1968
- Hexathele otira Forster, 1968
- Hexathele para Forster, 1968
- Hexathele petriei Goyen, 1887
- Hexathele pukea Forster, 1968
- Hexathele putuna Forster, 1968
- Hexathele ramsayi Forster, 1968
- Hexathele rupicola Forster, 1968
- Hexathele taumara Forster, 1968
- Hexathele waipa Forster, 1968
- Hexathele waita Forster, 1968
- Hexathele wiltoni Forster, 1968

=== Pycnothelidae ===
- Stanwellia bipectinata (Todd, 1945)
- Stanwellia hapua (Forster, 1968)
- Stanwellia hollowayi (Forster, 1968)
- Stanwellia houhora (Forster, 1968)
- Stanwellia kaituna (Forster, 1968)
- Stanwellia media (Forster, 1968)
- Stanwellia puna (Forster, 1968)
- Stanwellia regia (Forster, 1968)
- Stanwellia taranga (Forster, 1968)
- Stanwellia tuna (Forster, 1968)

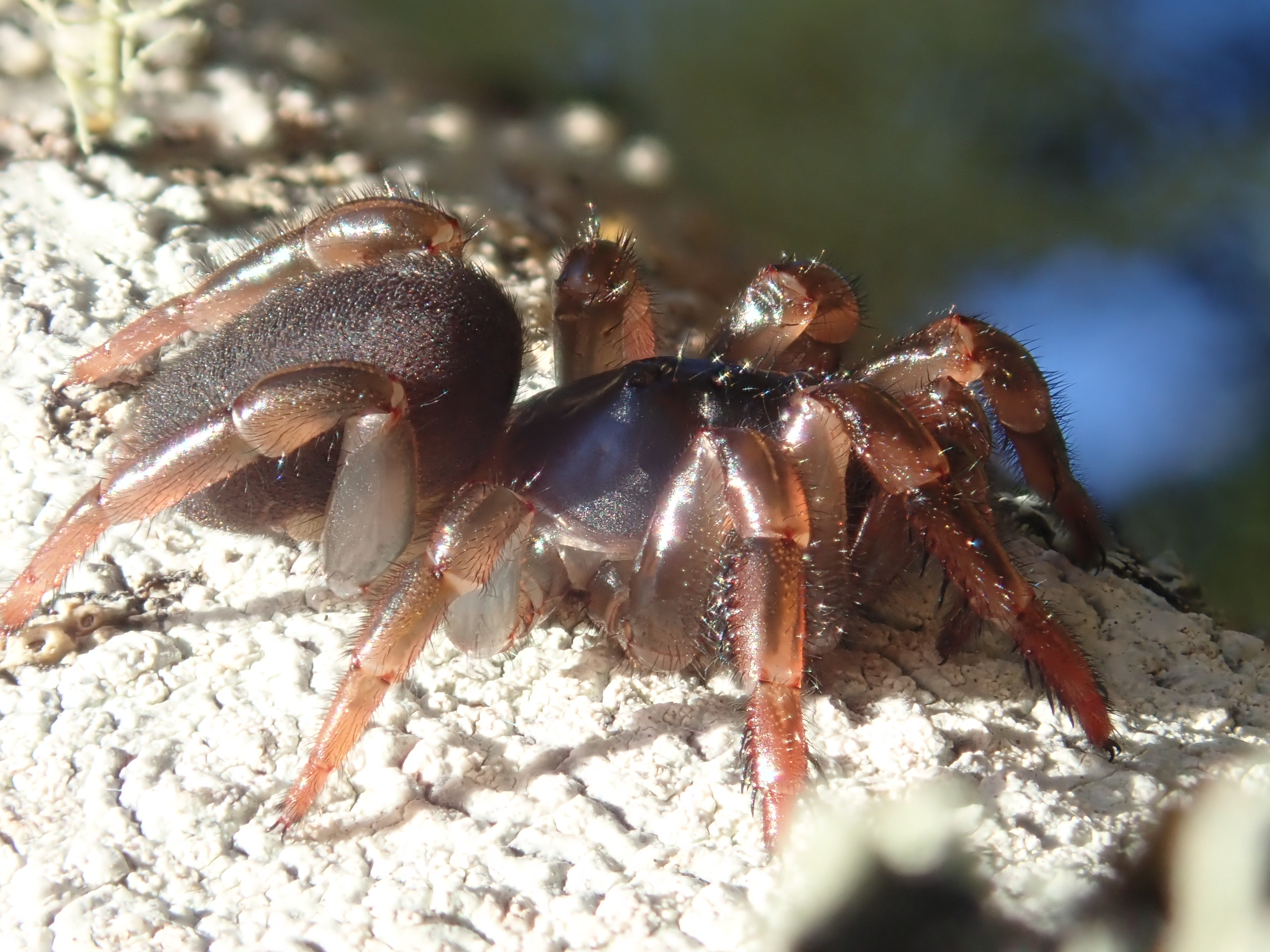
Migas sp.

=== Migidae ===
- Migas australis Wilton, 1968
- Migas borealis Wilton, 1968
- Migas cambridgei Wilton, 1968
- Migas cantuarius Wilton, 1968
- Migas centralis Wilton, 1968
- Migas cumberi Wilton, 1968
- Migas distinctus O. Pickard-Cambridge, 1880
- Migas gatenbyi Wilton, 1968
- Migas giveni Wilton, 1968
- Migas goyeni Wilton, 1968
- Migas hesperus Wilton, 1968
- Migas hollowayi Wilton, 1968
- Migas insularis Wilton, 1968
- Migas kirki Wilton, 1968
- Migas kochi Wilton, 1968
- Migas linburnensis Wilton, 1968
- Migas lomasi Wilton, 1968
- Migas marplesi Wilton, 1968
- Migas minor Wilton, 1968
- Migas otari Wilton, 1968
- Migas paradoxus L. Koch, 1873
- Migas quintus Wilton, 1968
- Migas sandageri Goyen, 1891
- Migas saxatilis Wilton, 1968
- Migas secundus Wilton, 1968
- Migas solitarius Wilton, 1968
- Migas taierii Todd, 1945
- Migas tasmani Wilton, 1968
- Migas toddae Wilton, 1968
- Migas tuhoe Wilton, 1968

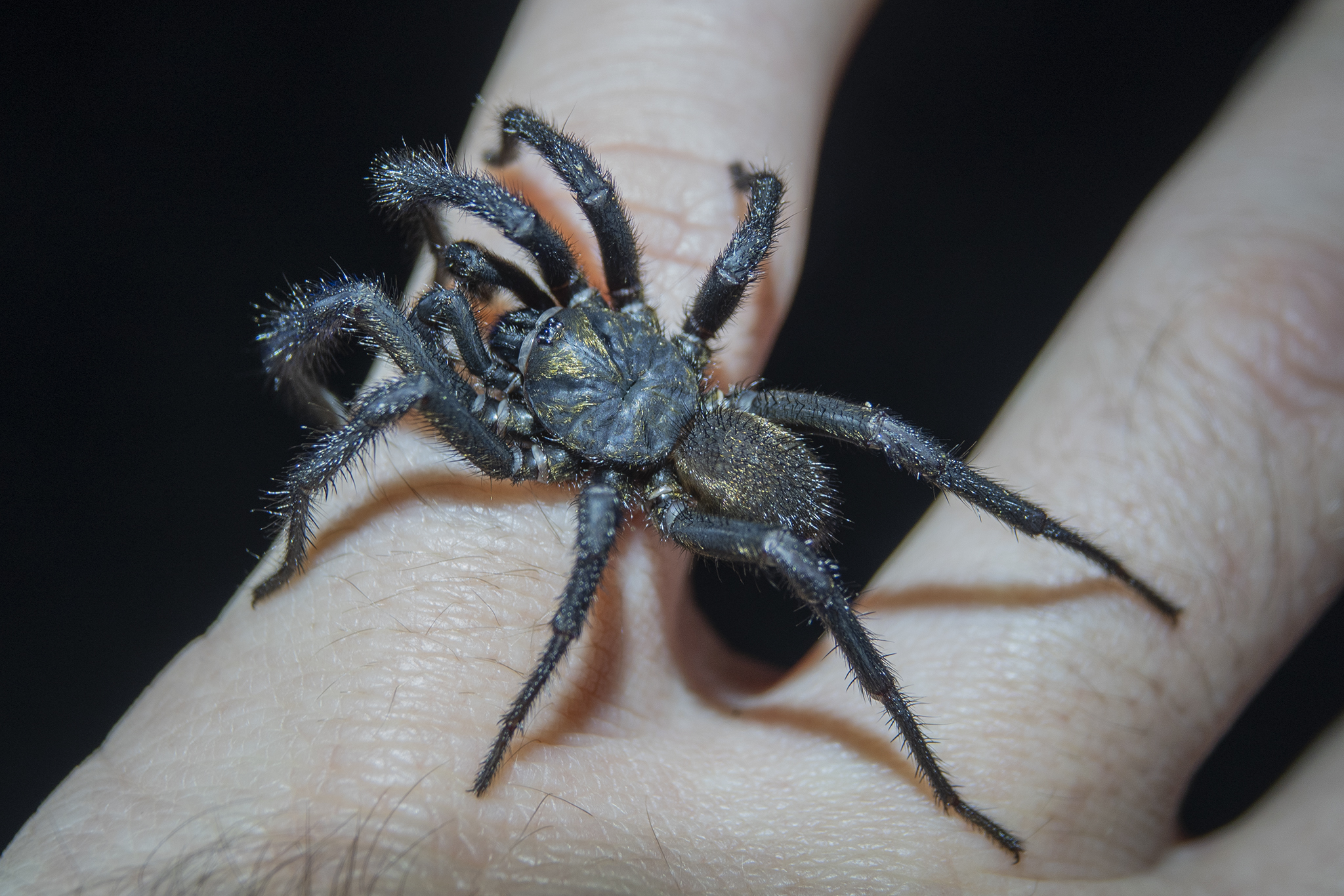
Cantuaria sp.

=== Idiopidae ===
- Cantuaria abdita Forster, 1968
- Cantuaria allani Forster, 1968
- Cantuaria aperta Forster, 1968
- Cantuaria apica Forster, 1968
- Cantuaria assimilis Forster, 1968
- Cantuaria borealis Forster, 1968
- Cantuaria catlinsensis Forster, 1968
- Cantuaria cognata Forster, 1968
- Cantuaria collensis (Todd, 1945)
- Cantuaria delli Forster, 1968
- Cantuaria dendyi (Hogg, 1901)
- Cantuaria depressa Forster, 1968
- Cantuaria dunedinensis Forster, 1968
- Cantuaria gilliesi (O. Pickard-Cambridge, 1878)
- Cantuaria grandis Forster, 1968
- Cantuaria huttoni (O. Pickard-Cambridge, 1880)
- Cantuaria insulana Forster, 1968
- Cantuaria isolata Forster, 1968
- Cantuaria johnsi Forster, 1968
- Cantuaria kakahuensis Forster, 1968
- Cantuaria kakanuiensis Forster, 1968
- Cantuaria lomasi Forster, 1968
- Cantuaria magna Forster, 1968
- Cantuaria marplesi (Todd, 1945)
- Cantuaria maxima Forster, 1968
- Cantuaria medialis Forster, 1968
- Cantuaria minor Forster, 1968
- Cantuaria myersi Forster, 1968
- Cantuaria napua Forster, 1968
- Cantuaria orepukiensis Forster, 1968
- Cantuaria parrotti Forster, 1968
- Cantuaria pilama Forster, 1968
- Cantuaria prina Forster, 1968
- Cantuaria reducta Forster, 1968
- Cantuaria secunda Forster, 1968
- Cantuaria sinclairi Forster, 1968
- Cantuaria stephenensis Forster, 1968
- Cantuaria stewarti (Todd, 1945)
- Cantuaria sylvatica Forster, 1968
- Cantuaria toddae Forster, 1968
- Cantuaria vellosa Forster, 1968
- Cantuaria wanganuiensis (Todd, 1945)

== Araneomorphae ==
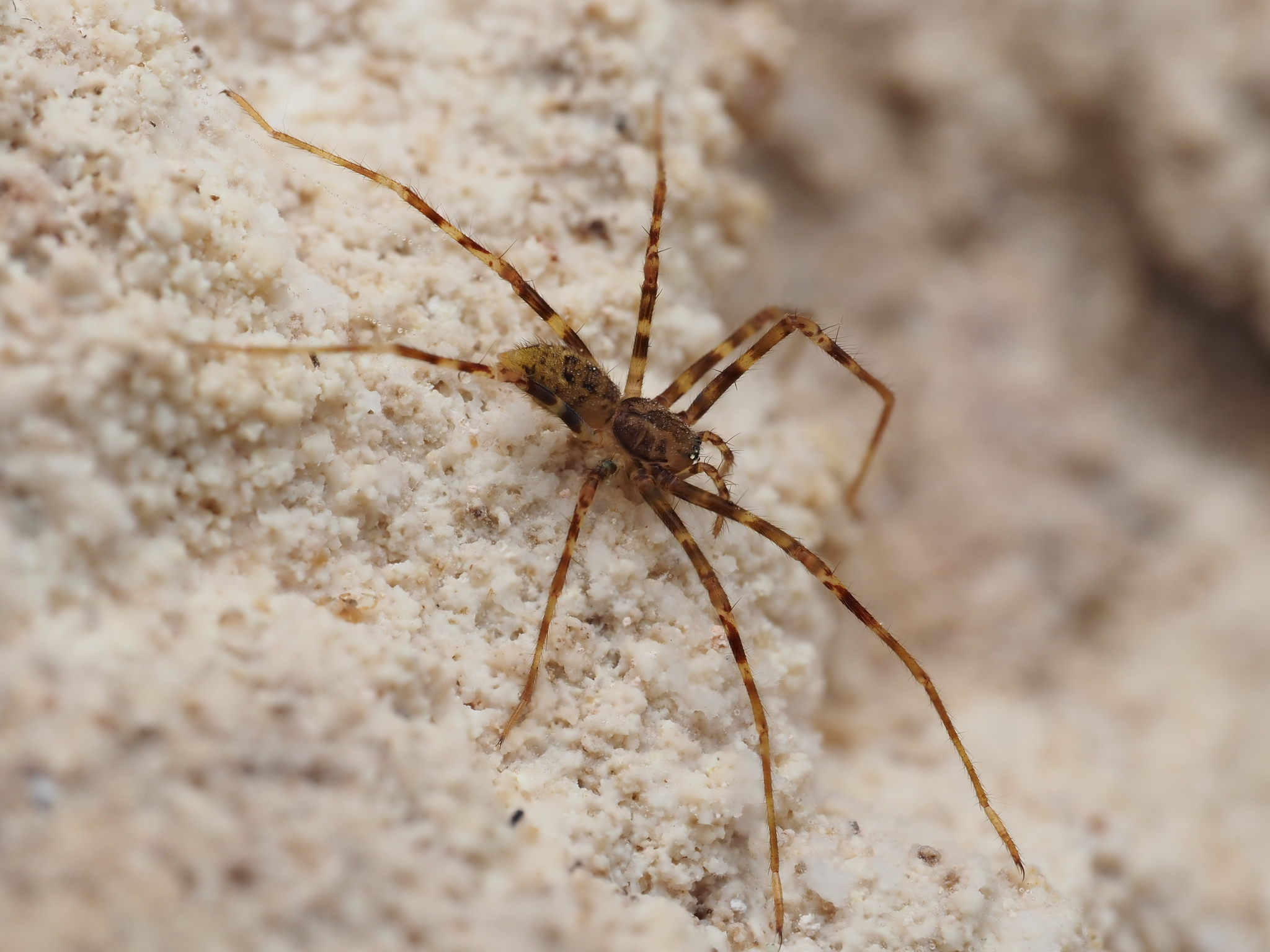
Spelungula cavernicola

=== Gradungulidae ===
- Gradungula sorenseni Forster, 1955
- Pianoa isolata Forster, 1987
- Spelungula cavernicola Forster, 1987

=== Segestriidae ===
- Ariadna barbigera Simon, 1905
- Ariadna bellatoria Dalmas, 1917
- Ariadna septemcincta (Urquhart, 1891)
- Segestria saeva Walckenaer, 1837

=== Dysderidae ===
- Dysdera crocata C.L. Koch 1838

=== Oonopidae ===
- Kapitia obscura Forster, 1956

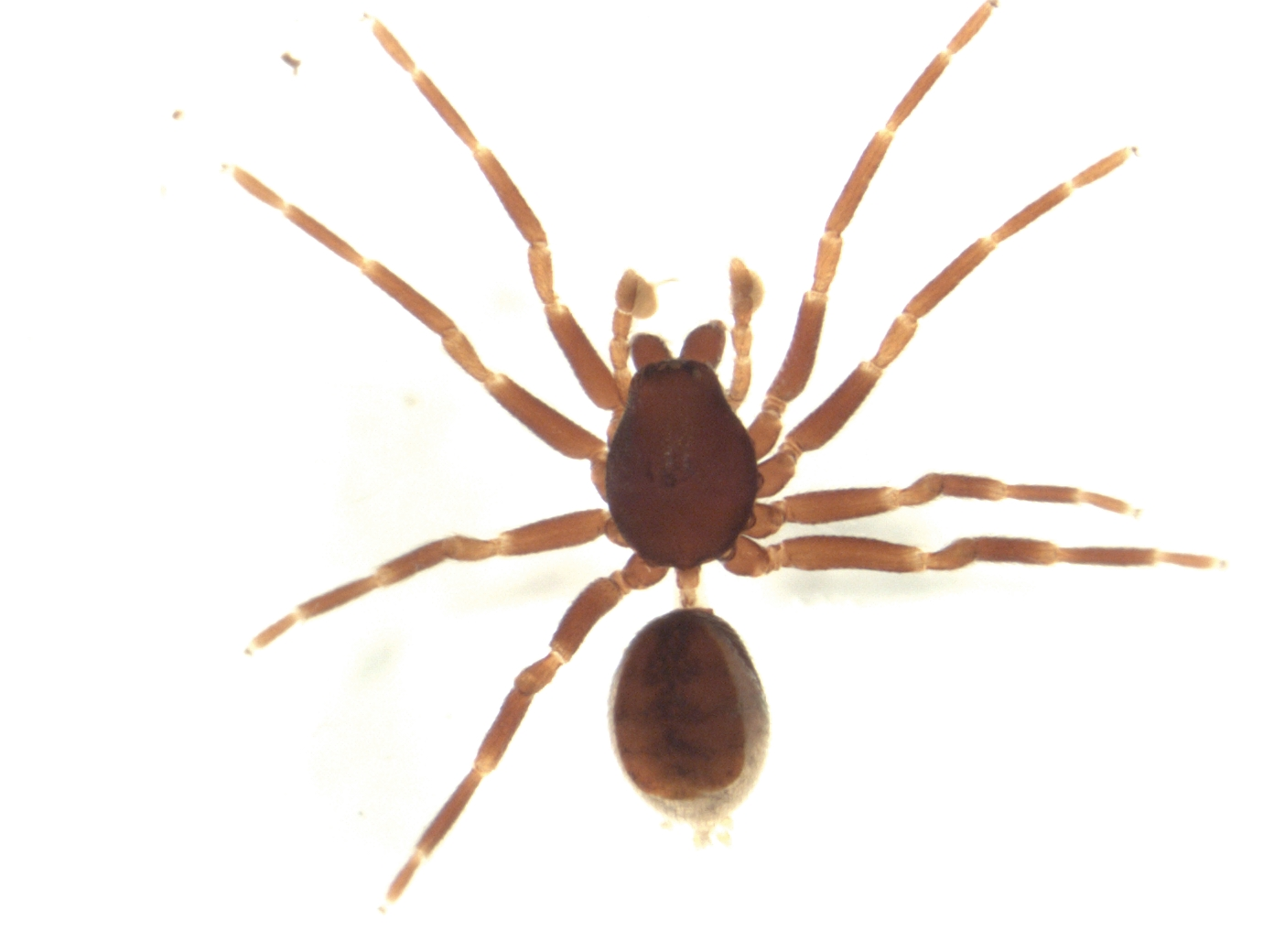
Duripelta sp

=== Orsolobidae ===
- Anopsolobus subterraneus Forster & Platnick, 1985
- Ascuta australis Forster, 1956
- Ascuta cantuaria Forster & Platnick, 1985
- Ascuta inopinata Forster, 1956
- Ascuta insula Forster & Platnick, 1985
- Ascuta leith Forster & Platnick, 1985
- Ascuta media Forster, 1956
- Ascuta monowai Forster & Platnick, 1985
- Ascuta montana Forster & Platnick, 1985
- Ascuta musca Forster & Platnick, 1985
- Ascuta ornata Forster, 1956
- Ascuta parornata Forster & Platnick, 1985
- Ascuta taupo Forster & Platnick, 1985
- Ascuta tongariro Forster & Platnick, 1985
- Ascuta univa Forster & Platnick, 1985
- Bealeyia unicolor Forster & Platnick, 1985
- Dugdalea oculata Forster & Platnick, 1985
- Duripelta alta Forster & Platnick, 1985
- Duripelta australis Forster, 1956
- Duripelta borealis Forster, 1956
- Duripelta egmont Forster & Platnick, 1985
- Duripelta hunua Forster & Platnick, 1985
- Duripelta koomaa Forster & Platnick, 1985
- Duripelta mawhero Forster & Platnick, 1985
- Duripelta minuta Forster, 1956
- Duripelta monowai Forster & Platnick, 1985
- Duripelta otara Forster & Platnick, 1985
- Duripelta pallida (Forster, 1956)
- Duripelta paringa Forster & Platnick, 1985
- Duripelta peha Forster & Platnick, 1985
- Duripelta scuta Forster & Platnick, 1985
- Duripelta totara Forster & Platnick, 1985
- Duripelta townsendi Forster & Platnick, 1985
- Duripelta watti Forster & Platnick, 1985
- Maoriata magna (Forster, 1956)
- Maoriata montana Forster & Platnick, 1985
- Maoriata vulgaris Forster & Platnick, 1985
- Orongia medialis Forster & Platnick, 1985
- Orongia motueka Forster & Platnick, 1985
- Orongia whangamoa Forster & Platnick, 1985
- Paralobus salmoni (Forster, 1956)
- Pounamuella australis (Forster, 1964)
- Pounamuella complexa (Forster, 1956)
- Pounamuella hauroko Forster & Platnick, 1985
- Pounamuella hollowayae (Forster, 1956)
- Pounamuella insula Forster & Platnick, 1985
- Pounamuella kuscheli Forster & Platnick, 1985
- Pounamuella ramsayi (Forster, 1956)
- Pounamuella vulgaris (Forster, 1956)
- Subantarctia centralis Forster & Platnick, 1985
- Subantarctia dugdalei Forster, 1956
- Subantarctia fiordensis Forster, 1956
- Subantarctia florae Forster, 1956
- Subantarctia muka Forster & Platnick, 1985
- Subantarctia penara Forster & Platnick, 1985
- Subantarctia stewartensis Forster, 1956
- Subantarctia trina Forster & Platnick, 1985
- Subantarctia turbotti Forster, 1955
- Tangata alpina (Forster, 1956)
- Tangata furcata Forster & Platnick, 1985
- Tangata horningi Forster & Platnick, 1985
- Tangata kohuka Forster & Platnick, 1985
- Tangata murihiku Forster & Platnick, 1985
- Tangata nigra Forster & Platnick, 1985
- Tangata orepukiensis (Forster, 1956)
- Tangata otago Forster & Platnick, 1985
- Tangata parafurcata Forster & Platnick, 1985
- Tangata plena (Forster, 1956)
- Tangata pouaka Forster & Platnick, 1985
- Tangata rakiura (Forster, 1956)
- Tangata stewartensis (Forster, 1956)
- Tangata sylvester Forster & Platnick, 1985
- Tangata tautuku Forster & Platnick, 1985
- Tangata townsendi Forster & Platnick, 1985
- Tangata waipoua Forster & Platnick, 1985
- Tautukua isolata Forster & Platnick, 1985
- Turretia dugdalei Forster & Platnick, 1985
- Waiporia algida (Forster, 1956)
- Waiporia chathamensis Forster & Platnick, 1985
- Waiporia egmont Forster & Platnick, 1985
- Waiporia extensa (Forster, 1956)
- Waiporia hawea Forster & Platnick, 1985
- Waiporia hornabrooki (Forster, 1956)
- Waiporia mensa (Forster, 1956)
- Waiporia modica (Forster, 1956)
- Waiporia owaka Forster & Platnick, 1985
- Waiporia ruahine Forster & Platnick, 1985
- Waiporia tuata Forster & Platnick, 1985
- Waiporia wiltoni Forster & Platnick, 1985
- Waipoua gressitti (Forster, 1964)
- Waipoua hila Forster & Platnick, 1985
- Waipoua insula Forster & Platnick, 1985
- Waipoua montana Forster & Platnick, 1985
- Waipoua otiana Forster & Platnick, 1985
- Waipoua ponanga Forster & Platnick, 1985
- Waipoua toronui Forster & Platnick, 1985
- Waipoua totara (Forster, 1956)
- Wiltonia elongata Forster & Platnick, 1985
- Wiltonia eylesi Forster & Platnick, 1985
- Wiltonia fiordensis Forster & Platnick, 1985
- Wiltonia graminicola Forster & Platnick, 1985
- Wiltonia lima Forster & Platnick, 1985
- Wiltonia nelsonensis Forster & Platnick, 1985
- Wiltonia pecki Forster & Platnick, 1985
- Wiltonia porina Forster & Platnick, 1985
- Wiltonia rotoiti Forster & Platnick, 1985

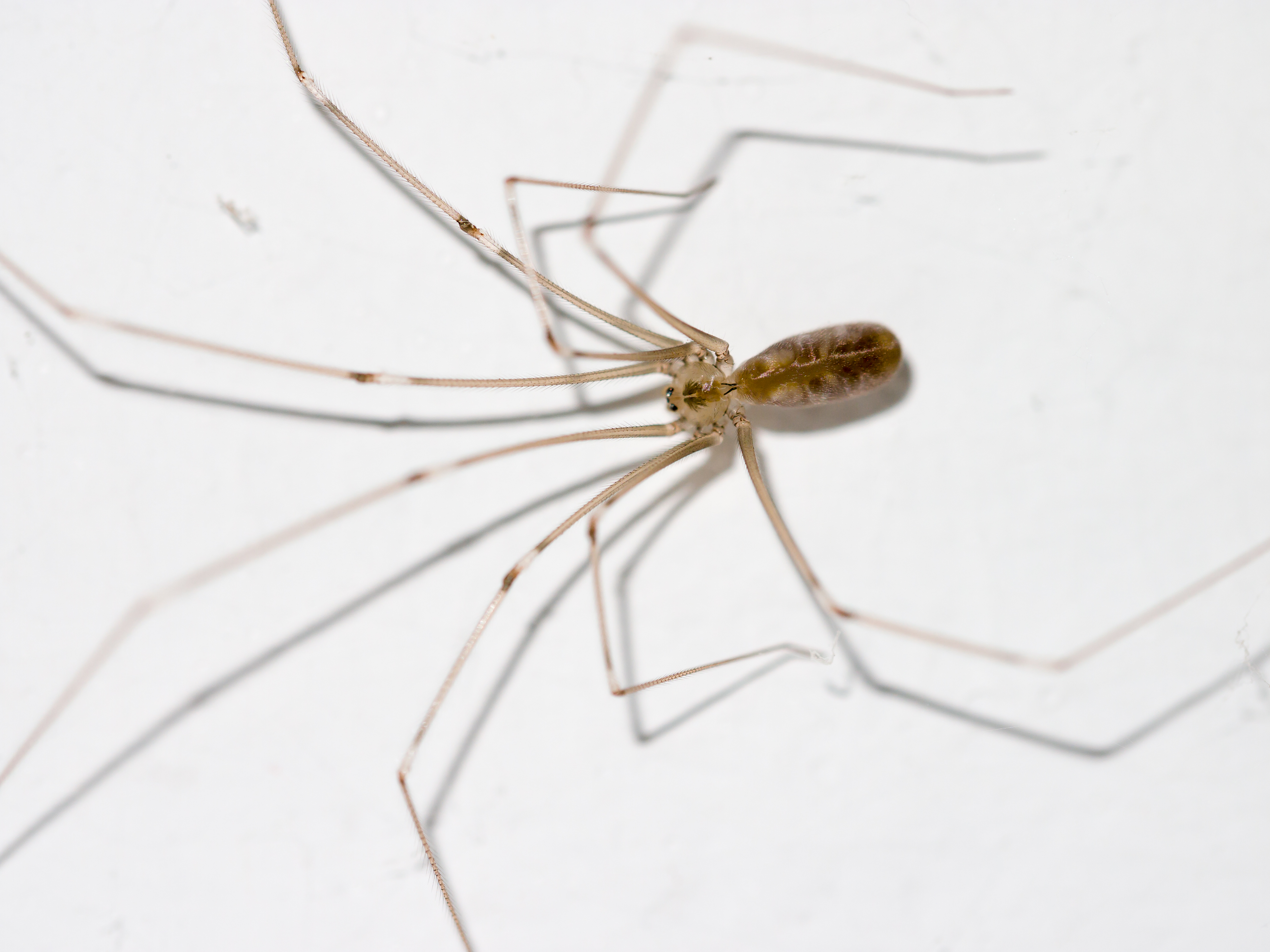
Pholcus phalangioides

=== Pholcidae ===
- Pholcus phalangioides (Fuesslin, 1775)
- Psilochorus simoni (Berland, 1911)

=== Scytodidae ===
- Scytodes thoracica (Latreille, 1802)

=== Periegopidae ===
- Periegops keani Vink, Dupérré & Malumbres-Olarte, 2013
- Periegops suterii (Urquhart, 1892)

=== Oecobiidae ===
- Oecobius navus Blackwall, 1859

=== Mimetidae ===
- Australomimetus mendicus (O. Pickard-Cambridge, 1880)
- Australomimetus sennio (Urquhart, 1891)

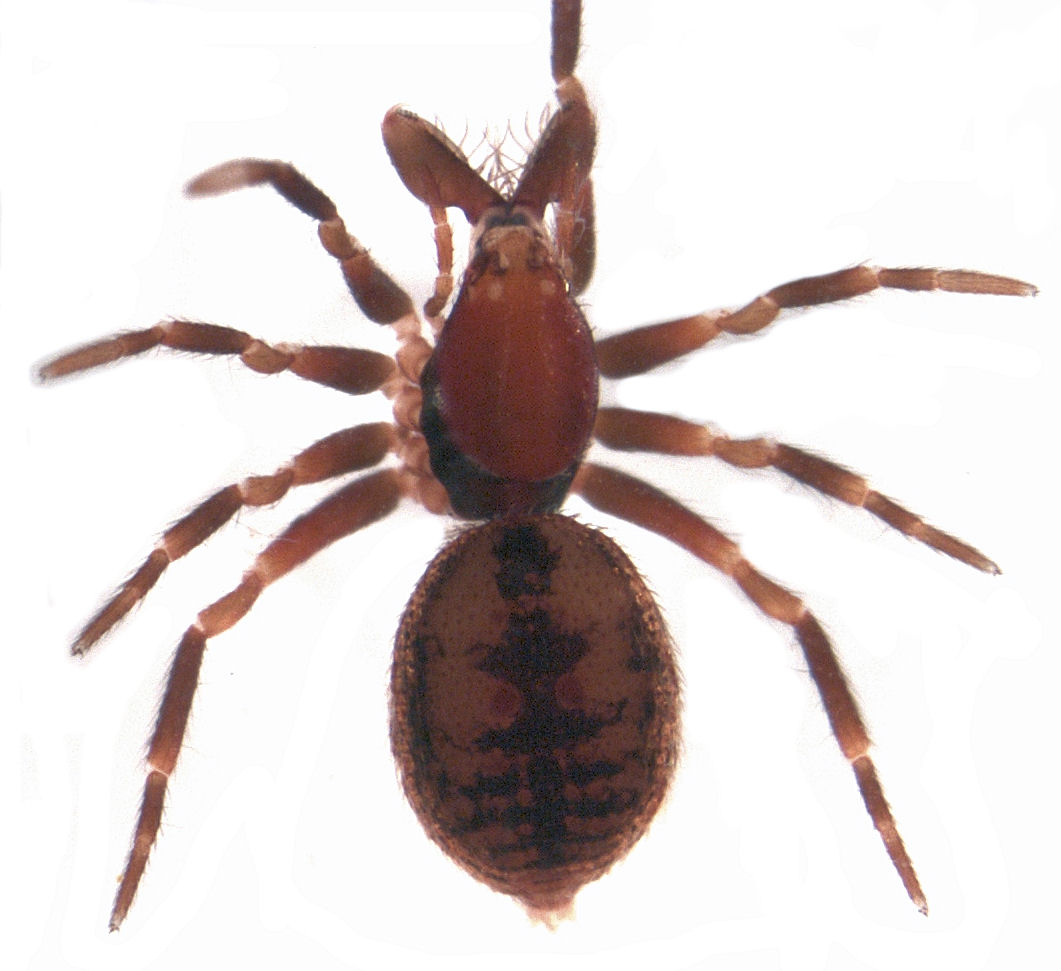
Forstrarchaea rubra

=== Malkaridae ===
- Forstrarchaea rubra (Forster, 1949)
- Ozarchaea forsteri Rix, 2006
- Pararchaea alba Forster, 1955
- Whakamoke guacamole Hormiga & Scharff, 2020
- Whakamoke heru Hormiga & Scharff, 2020
- Whakamoke hunahuna Hormiga & Scharff, 2020
- Whakamoke orongorongo Hormiga & Scharff, 2020
- Whakamoke paoka Hormiga & Scharff, 2020
- Whakamoke rakiura Hormiga & Scharff, 2020
- Whakamoke tarakina Hormiga & Scharff, 2020

=== Huttoniidae ===
- Huttonia palpimanoides O. Pickard-Cambridge, 1880

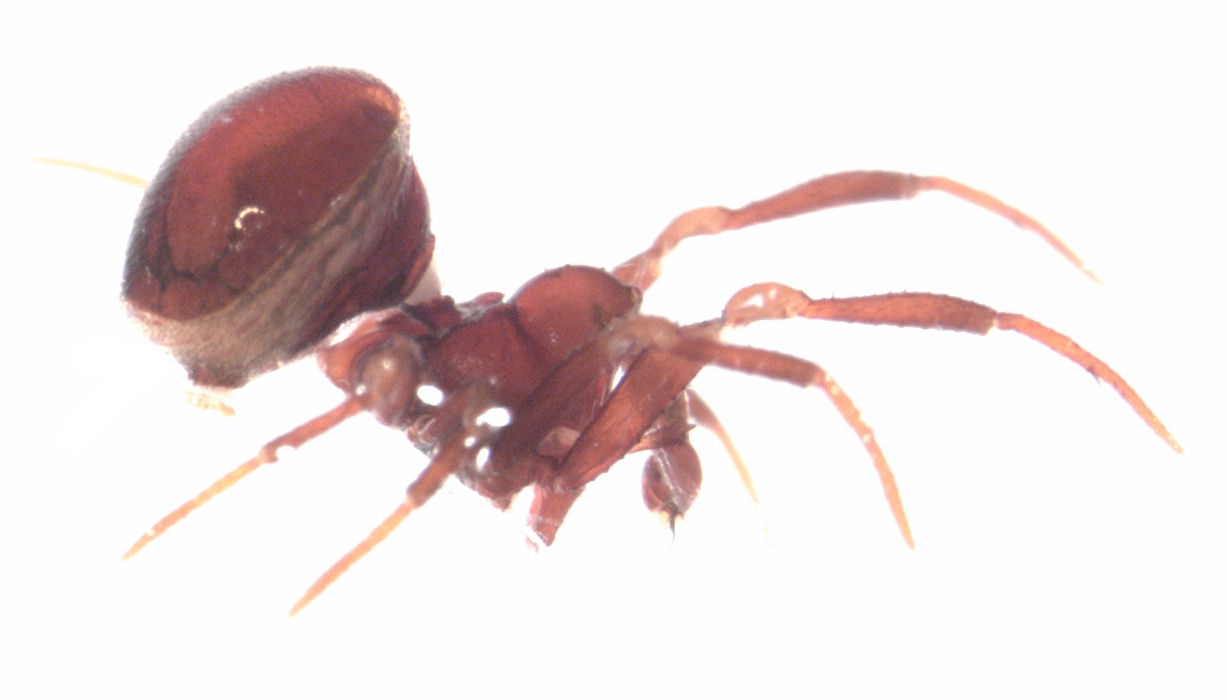
Novanapis spinipes

=== Anapidae ===
- Algidiella aucklandica (Forster, 1955)
- Holarchaea novaeseelandiae (Forster, 1949)
- Novanapis spinipes (Forster, 1951)
- Paranapis insula (Forster, 1951)
- Paranapis isolata Platnick & Forster, 1989
- Pua novaezealandiae Forster, 1959
- Rayforstia antipoda (Forster, 1959)
- Rayforstia insula (Forster, 1959)
- Rayforstia mcfarlanei (Forster, 1959)
- Rayforstia plebeia (Forster, 1959)
- Rayforstia propinqua (Forster, 1959)
- Rayforstia salmoni (Forster, 1959)
- Rayforstia scuta (Forster, 1959)
- Rayforstia signata (Forster, 1959)
- Rayforstia vulgaris (Forster, 1959)
- Rayforstia wisei (Forster, 1964)
- Taliniella nigra (Forster, 1959)
- Taliniella vinki Rix & Harvey, 2010
- Taphiassa punctata (Forster, 1959)
- Tinytrella pusilla (Forster, 1959)
- Zealanapis armata (Forster, 1951)
- Zealanapis australis (Forster, 1951)
- Zealanapis conica (Forster, 1951)
- Zealanapis insula Platnick & Forster, 1989
- Zealanapis kuscheli Platnick & Forster, 1989
- Zealanapis matua Platnick & Forster, 1989
- Zealanapis montana Platnick & Forster, 1989
- Zealanapis otago Platnick & Forster, 1989
- Zealanapis punta Platnick & Forster, 1989
- Zealanapis waipoua Platnick & Forster, 1989

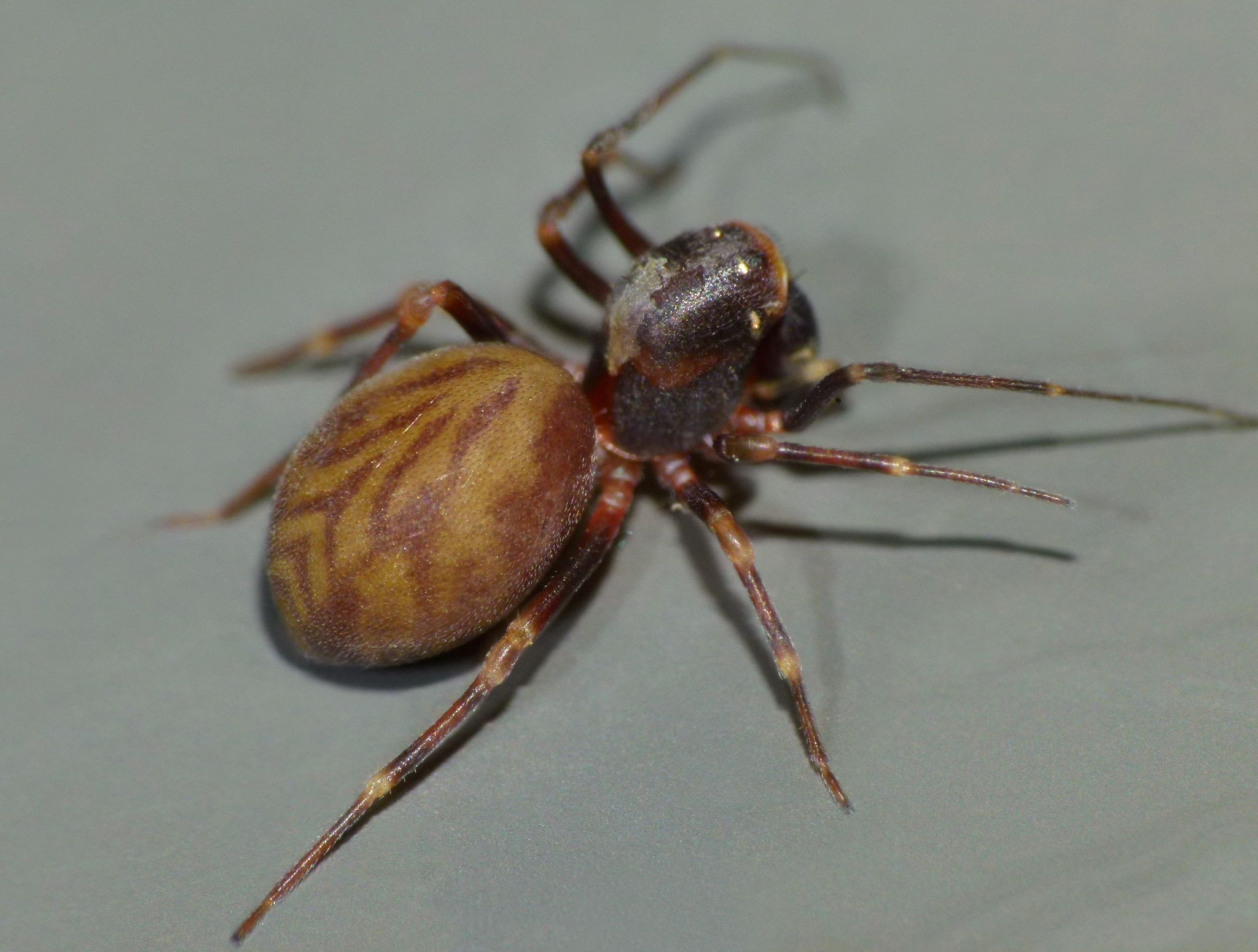
Aotearoa magna

=== Mecysmaucheniidae ===
- Aotearoa magna (Forster, 1949)
- Zearchaea clypeata Wilton, 1946
- Zearchaea fiordensis Forster, 1955

=== Deinopidae ===
- Asianopis subrufa L. Koch 1879

=== Uloboridae ===
- Waitkera waitakerensis (Chamberlain, 1946)

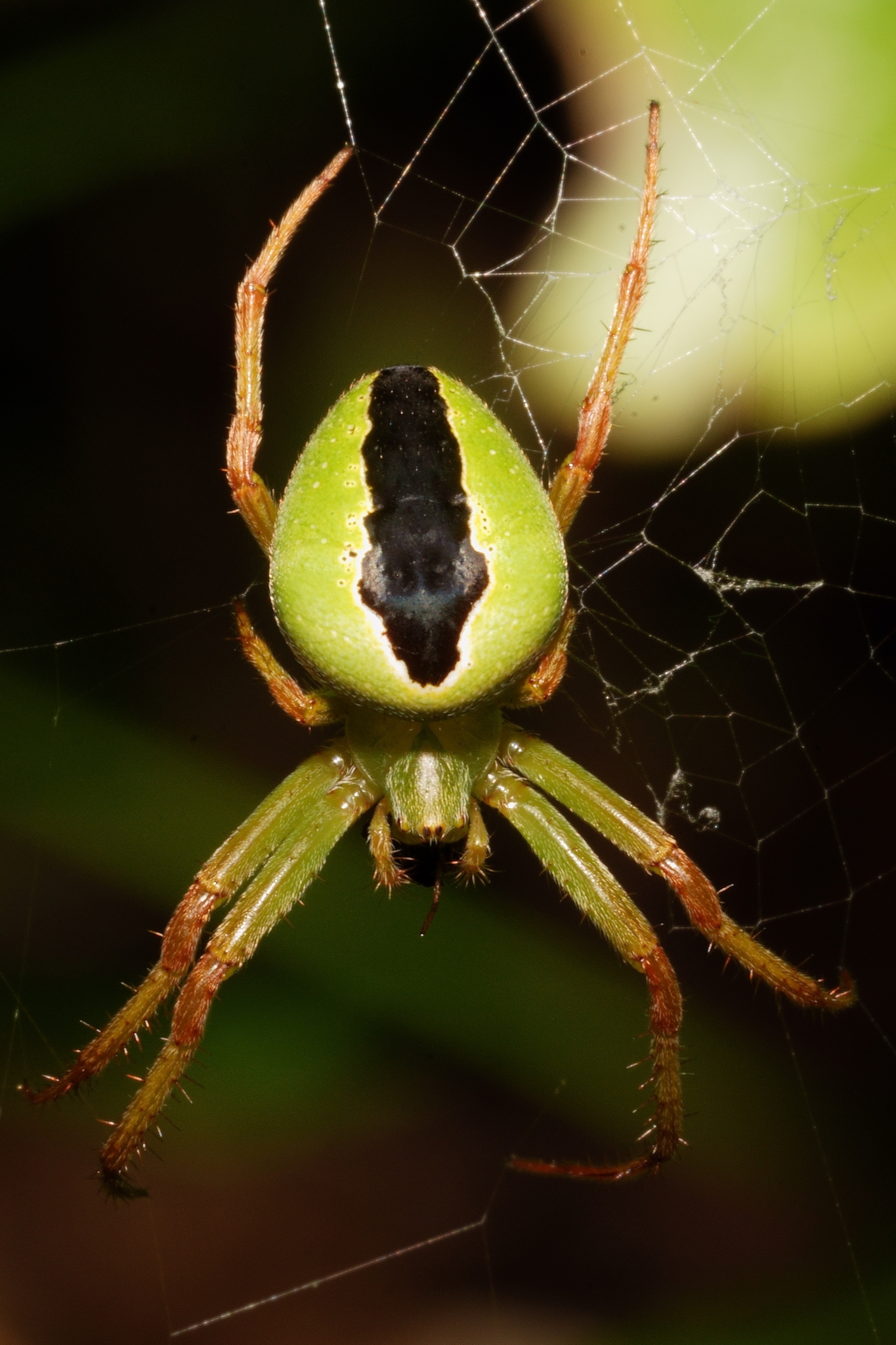
Colaranea melanoviridis

=== Araneidae ===
- Acroaspis decorosa (Urquhart, 1894)
- Arachnura feredayi (L. Koch, 1872)
- Argiope protensa L. Koch, 1872
- Backobourkia brouni (Urquhart, 1885)
- Celaenia atkinsoni (O. Pickard-Cambridge, 1880)
- Celaenia excavata (L. Koch, 1867)
- Celaenia hectori (O. Pickard-Cambridge, 1880)
- Celaenia olivacea (Urquhart, 1885)
- Celaenia penna (Urquhart, 1887)
- Celaenia tuberosa (Urquhart, 1889)
- Colaranea brunnea Court & Forster, 1988
- Colaranea melanoviridis Court & Forster, 1988
- Colaranea verutum (Urquhart, 1887)
- Colaranea viriditas (Urquhart, 1887)
- Courtaraneus orientalis (Urquhart, 1887)
- Cryptaranea albolineata (Urquhart, 1893)
- Cryptaranea atrihastula (Urquhart, 1891)
- Cryptaranea invisibilis (Urquhart, 1892)
- Cryptaranea stewartensis Court & Forster, 1988
- Cryptaranea subalpina Court & Forster, 1988
- Cryptaranea subcompta (Urquhart, 1887)
- Cryptaranea venustula (Urquhart, 1891)
- Cyclosa trilobata (Urquhart, 1885)
- Novakiella trituberculosa (Roewer, 1942)
- Novaranea queribunda (Keyserling, 1887)
- Poecilopachys australasia (Griffith & Pidgeon, 1833)
- Prasonica plagiata (Dalmas, 1917)
- Socca pustulosa (Walckenaer, 1841)
- Zealaranea crassa (Walckenaer, 1841)
- Zealaranea prina Court & Forster, 1988
- Zealaranea saxitalis (Urquhart, 1887)
- Zealaranea trinotata (Urquhart, 1890)
- Zygiella x-notata (Clerck 1758)

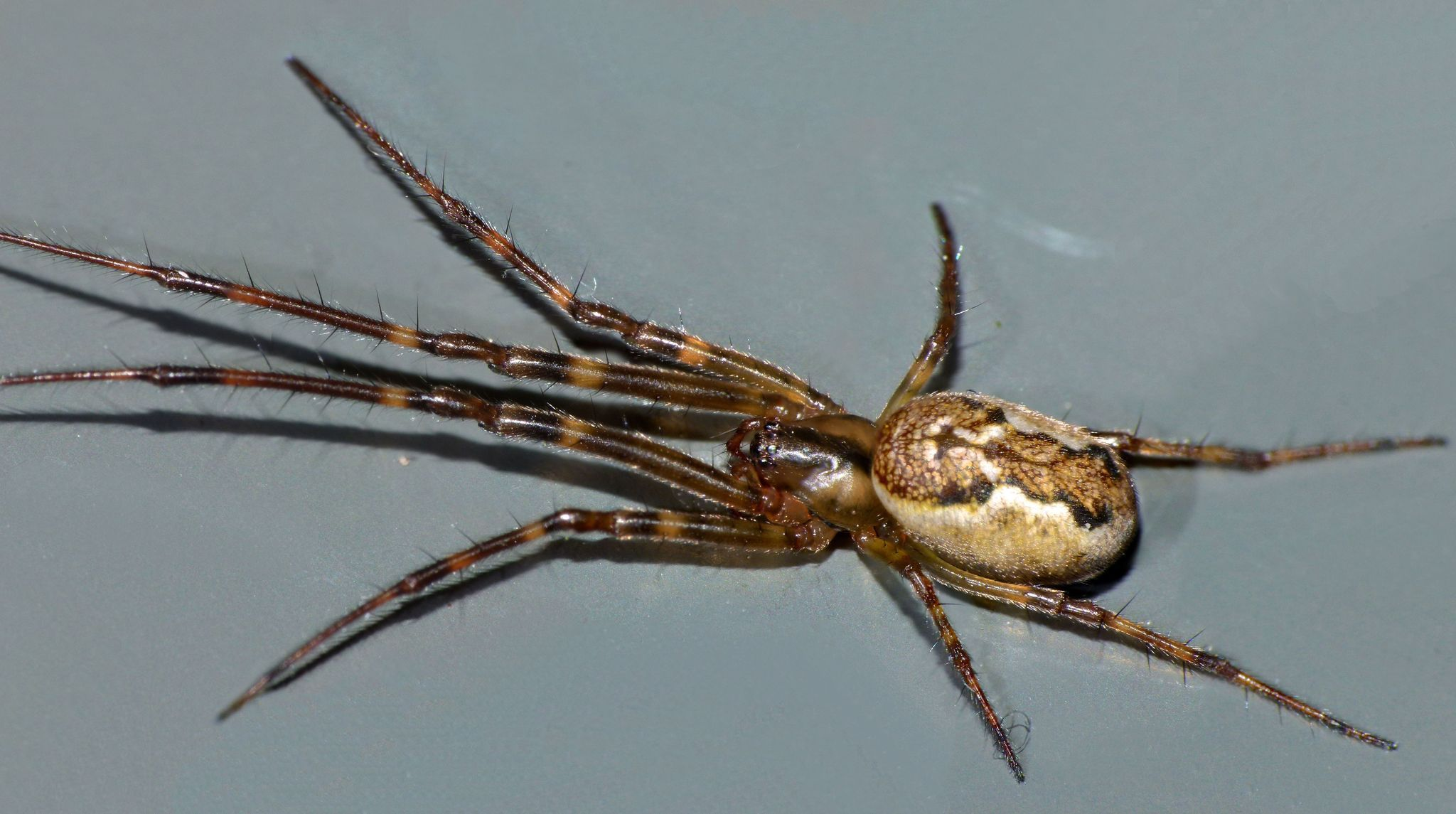
Nanometa lagenifera

=== Tetragnathidae ===
- Leucauge dromedaria (Thorell, 1881)
- Nanometa forsteri Álvarez-Padilla, Kallal & Hormiga, 2020
- Nanometa lagenifera (Urquhart, 1888)
- Nanometa purpurapunctata (Urquhart, 1889)
- Taraire oculta Álvarez-Padilla, Kallal & Hormiga, 2020
- Taraire rufolineata (Urquhart, 1889)
- Tawhai arborea (Urquhart, 1891)
- Tetragnatha flavida Urquhart, 1891
- Tetragnatha multipunctata Urquhart, 1891
- Tetragnatha nigricans Dalmas, 1917
- Tetragnatha nitens (Audouin, 1826)
- Trichonephila edulis (Labillardière, 1799)

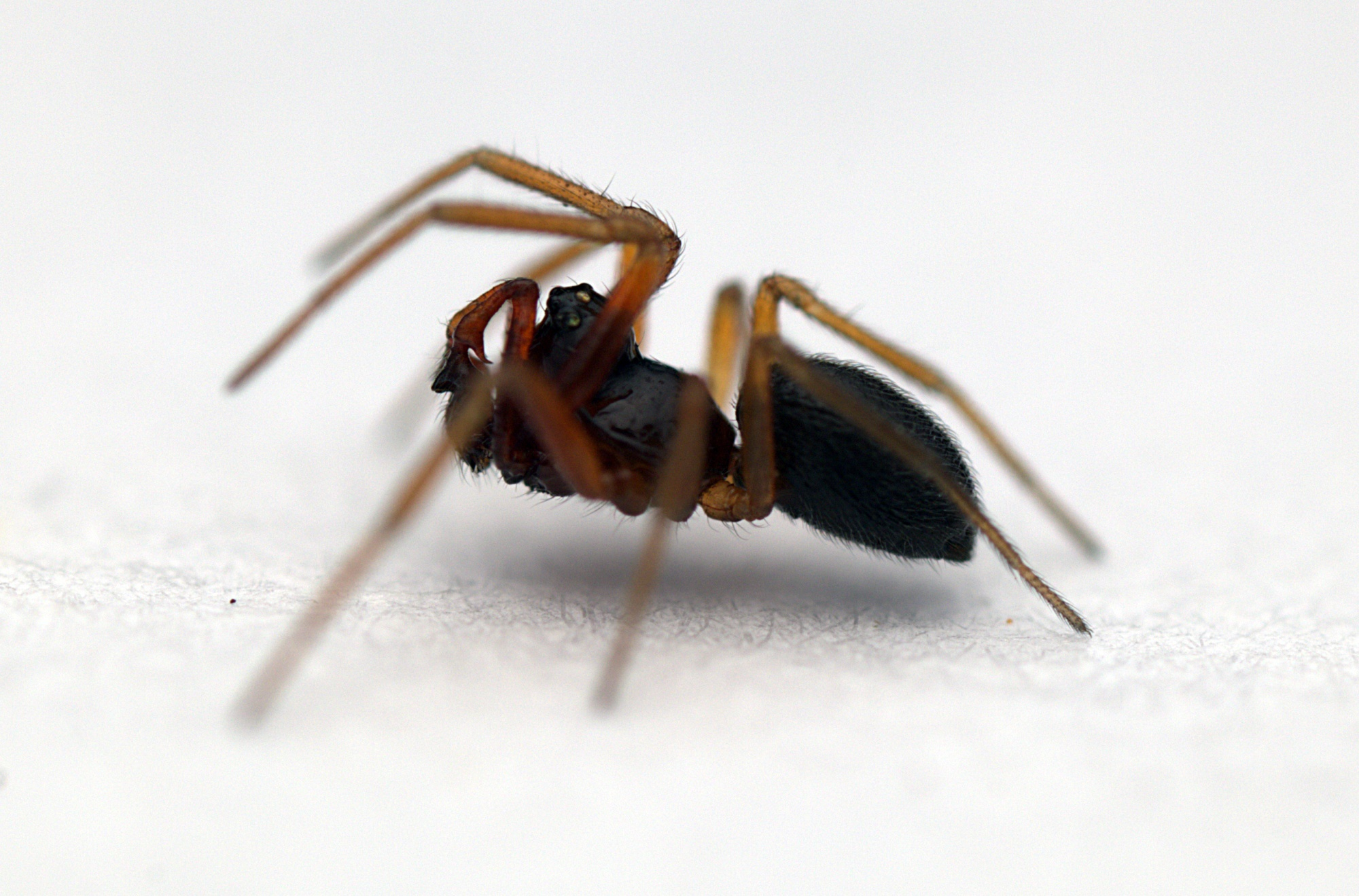
Erigone prominens

=== Linyphiidae ===
- Araeoncus humilis (Blackwall, 1841)
- Cassafroneta forsteri Blest, 1979
- Cassafroneta forsteri Blest, 1979
- Diplocephalus cristatus (Blackwall, 1833)
- Diploplecta adjacens Millidge, 1988
- Diploplecta australis (Forster, 1955)
- Diploplecta communis Millidge, 1988
- Diploplecta duplex Millidge, 1988
- Diploplecta nuda Millidge, 1988
- Diploplecta opaca Millidge, 1988
- Diploplecta proxima Millidge, 1988
- Diploplecta pumilio (Urquhart, 1886)
- Diploplecta simplex Millidge, 1988
- Dunedinia decolor Millidge, 1988
- Dunedinia denticulata Millidge, 1988
- Dunedinia pullata Millidge, 1988
- Erigone prominens Bösenberg & Strand, 1906
- Erigone wiltoni Locket, 1973
- Haplinis abbreviata (Blest, 1979)
- Haplinis alticola Blest & Vink, 2002
- Haplinis anomala Blest & Vink, 2003
- Haplinis antipodiana Blest & Vink, 2002
- Haplinis attenuata Blest & Vink, 2002
- Haplinis banksi (Blest, 1979)
- Haplinis brevipes (Blest, 1979)
- Haplinis chiltoni (Hogg, 1911)
- Haplinis contorta (Blest, 1979)
- Haplinis diloris (Urquhart, 1886)
- Haplinis dunstani (Blest, 1979)
- Haplinis exigua Blest & Vink, 2002
- Haplinis fluviatilis (Blest, 1979)
- Haplinis fucatinia (Urquhart, 1894)
- Haplinis fulvolineata Blest & Vink, 2002
- Haplinis horningi (Blest, 1979)
- Haplinis inexacta (Blest, 1979)
- Haplinis innotabilis (Blest, 1979)
- Haplinis insignis (Blest, 1979)
- Haplinis major (Blest, 1979)
- Haplinis marplesi Blest & Vink, 2003
- Haplinis minutissima (Blest, 1979)
- Haplinis morainicola Blest & Vink, 2002
- Haplinis mundenia (Urquhart, 1894)
- Haplinis paradoxa (Blest, 1979)
- Haplinis redacta (Blest, 1979)
- Haplinis rufocephala (Urquhart, 1888)
- Haplinis rupicola (Blest, 1979)
- Haplinis silvicola (Blest, 1979)
- Haplinis similis (Blest, 1979)
- Haplinis subclathrata Simon, 1894
- Haplinis subdola (O. Pickard-Cambridge, 1880)
- Haplinis subtilis Blest & Vink, 2002
- Haplinis taranakii (Blest, 1979)
- Haplinis tegulata (Blest, 1979)
- Haplinis titan (Blest, 1979)
- Haplinis tokaanuae Blest & Vink, 2002
- Haplinis wairarapa Blest & Vink, 2002
- Hyperafroneta obscura Blest, 1979
- Laperousea blattifera (Urquhart, 1887)
- Lessertia dentichelis (Simon, 1884)
- Lessertia dentichelis (Simon, 1884)
- Laetesia amoena Millidge, 1988
- Laetesia aucklandensis (Forster, 1964)
- Laetesia bellissima Millidge, 1988
- Laetesia chathami Millidge, 1988
- Laetesia distincta Millidge, 1988
- Laetesia germana Millidge, 1988
- Laetesia intermedia Blest & Vink, 2003
- Laetesia minor Millidge, 1988
- Laetesia olvidada Blest & Vink, 2003
- Laetesia paragermana Blest & Vink, 2003
- Laetesia peramoena (O. Pickard-Cambridge, 1880)
- Laetesia prominens Millidge, 1988
- Laetesia pseudamoena Blest & Vink, 2003
- Laetesia pulcherrima Blest & Vink, 2003
- Laetesia trispathulata (Urquhart, 1886)
- Laperousea blattifera (Urquhart, 1887)
- Maorineta acerba Millidge, 1988
- Maorineta gentilis Millidge, 1988
- Maorineta minor Millidge, 1988
- Maorineta mollis Millidge, 1988
- Maorineta sulcata Millidge, 1988
- Maorineta tibialis Millidge, 1988
- Maorineta tumida Millidge, 1988
- Mermessus fradeorum (Berland, 1932)
- Megafroneta dugdalei Blest & Vink, 2002
- Megafroneta elongata Blest, 1979
- Megafroneta gigas Blest, 1979
- Metafroneta minima Blest, 1979
- Metafroneta sinuosa Blest, 1979
- Metafroneta subversa Blest & Vink, 2002
- Metamynoglenes absurda Blest & Vink, 2002
- Metamynoglenes attenuata Blest, 1979
- Metamynoglenes flagellata Blest, 1979
- Metamynoglenes gracilis Blest, 1979
- Metamynoglenes helicoides Blest, 1979
- Metamynoglenes incurvata Blest, 1979
- Metamynoglenes magna Blest, 1979
- Metamynoglenes ngongotaha Blest & Vink, 2002
- Microctenonyx subitaneus (O. Pickard-Cambridge, 1875)
- Novalaetesia anceps Millidge, 1988
- Novalaetesia atra Blest & Vink, 2003
- Novafroneta annulipes Blest, 1979
- Novafroneta gladiatrix Blest, 1979
- Novafroneta nova Blest & Vink, 2003
- Novafroneta parmulata Blest, 1979
- Novafroneta truncata Blest & Vink, 2003
- Novafroneta vulgaris Blest, 1979
- Ostearius melanopygius (O. Pickard-Cambridge, 1880)
- Parafroneta ambigua Blest, 1979
- Parafroneta confusa Blest, 1979
- Parafroneta demota Blest & Vink, 2002
- Parafroneta haurokoae Blest & Vink, 2002
- Parafroneta hirsuta Blest & Vink, 2003
- Parafroneta insula Blest, 1979
- Parafroneta marrineri (Hogg, 1909)
- Parafroneta minuta Blest, 1979
- Parafroneta monticola Blest, 1979
- Parafroneta persimilis Blest, 1979
- Parafroneta pilosa Blest & Vink, 2003
- Parafroneta subalpina Blest & Vink, 2002
- Parafroneta subantarctica Blest, 1979
- Parafroneta westlandica Blest & Vink, 2002
- Poecilafroneta caudata Blest, 1979
- Promynoglenes grandis Blest, 1979
- Promynoglenes minuscula Blest & Vink, 2003
- Promynoglenes minuta Blest & Vink, 2002
- Promynoglenes nobilis Blest, 1979
- Promynoglenes parvula Blest, 1979
- Promynoglenes silvestris Blest, 1979
- Protoerigone obtusa Blest, 1979
- Protoerigone otagoa Blest, 1979
- Pseudafroneta frigida Blest, 1979
- Pseudafroneta incerta (Bryant, 1935)
- Pseudafroneta lineata Blest, 1979
- Pseudafroneta maxima Blest, 1979
- Pseudafroneta pallida Blest, 1979
- Pseudafroneta perplexa Blest, 1979
- Pseudafroneta prominula Blest, 1979
- Tenuiphantes tenuis (Blackwall, 1852)

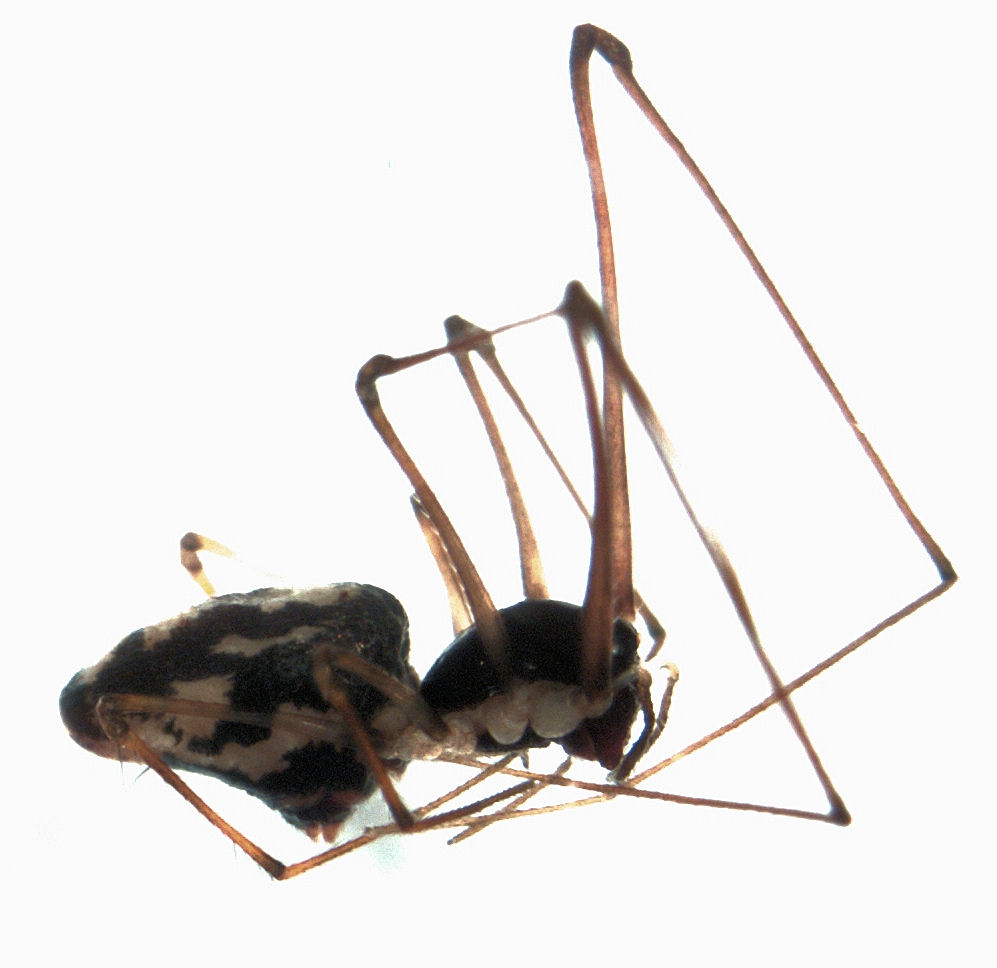
Tekelloides flavonotatus

=== Cyatholipidae ===
- Hanea paturau Forster, 1988
- Tekella absidata Urquhart, 1894
- Tekella bisetosa Forster, 1988
- Tekella lineata Forster, 1988
- Tekella nemoralis (Urquhart, 1889)
- Tekella unisetosa Forster, 1988
- Tekelloides australis Forster, 1988
- Tekelloides flavonotatus (Urquhart, 1891)

=== Physoglenidae ===
- Mangua caswell Forster, 1990
- Mangua convoluta Forster, 1990
- Mangua flora Forster, 1990
- Mangua forsteri (Brignoli, 1983)
- Mangua gunni Forster, 1990
- Mangua hughsoni Forster, 1990
- Mangua kapiti Forster, 1990
- Mangua makarora Forster, 1990
- Mangua medialis Forster, 1990
- Mangua oparara Forster, 1990
- Mangua otira Forster, 1990
- Mangua paringa Forster, 1990
- Mangua sana Forster, 1990
- Mangua secunda Forster, 1990
- Meringa australis Forster, 1990
- Meringa borealis Forster, 1990
- Meringa centralis Forster, 1990
- Meringa conway Forster, 1990
- Meringa hinaka Forster, 1990
- Meringa leith Forster, 1990
- Meringa nelson Forster, 1990
- Meringa otago Forster, 1990
- Meringa tetragyna Forster, 1990
- Nomaua arborea Forster, 1990
- Nomaua cauda Forster, 1990
- Nomaua crinifrons (Urquhart, 1891)
- Nomaua nelson Forster, 1990
- Nomaua perdita Forster, 1990
- Nomaua rakiura Fitzgerald & Sirvid, 2009
- Nomaua repanga Fitzgerald & Sirvid, 2009
- Nomaua rimutaka Fitzgerald & Sirvid, 2009
- Nomaua taranga Fitzgerald & Sirvid, 2009
- Nomaua urquharti Fitzgerald & Sirvid, 2009
- Nomaua waikanae (Forster, 1990)
- Nomaua waikaremoana Forster, 1990
- Pahora cantuaria Forster, 1990
- Pahora graminicola Forster, 1990
- Pahora kaituna Forster, 1990
- Pahora media Forster, 1990
- Pahora montana Forster, 1990
- Pahora murihiku Forster, 1990
- Pahora rakiura Forster, 1990
- Pahora taranaki Forster, 1990
- Pahora wiltoni Forster, 1990
- Pahoroides aucklandica Fitzgerald & Sirvid, 2011
- Pahoroides balli Fitzgerald & Sirvid, 2011
- Pahoroides confusa Fitzgerald & Sirvid, 2011
- Pahoroides courti Forster, 1990
- Pahoroides forsteri Fitzgerald & Sirvid, 2011
- Pahoroides gallina Fitzgerald & Sirvid, 2011
- Pahoroides kohukohu Fitzgerald & Sirvid, 2011
- Pahoroides whangarei Forster, 1990
- Runga akaroa Forster, 1990
- Runga flora Forster, 1990
- Runga moana Forster, 1990
- Runga nina Forster, 1990
- Runga raroa Forster, 1990
- Zeatupua forsteri Fitzgerald & Sirvid, 2009

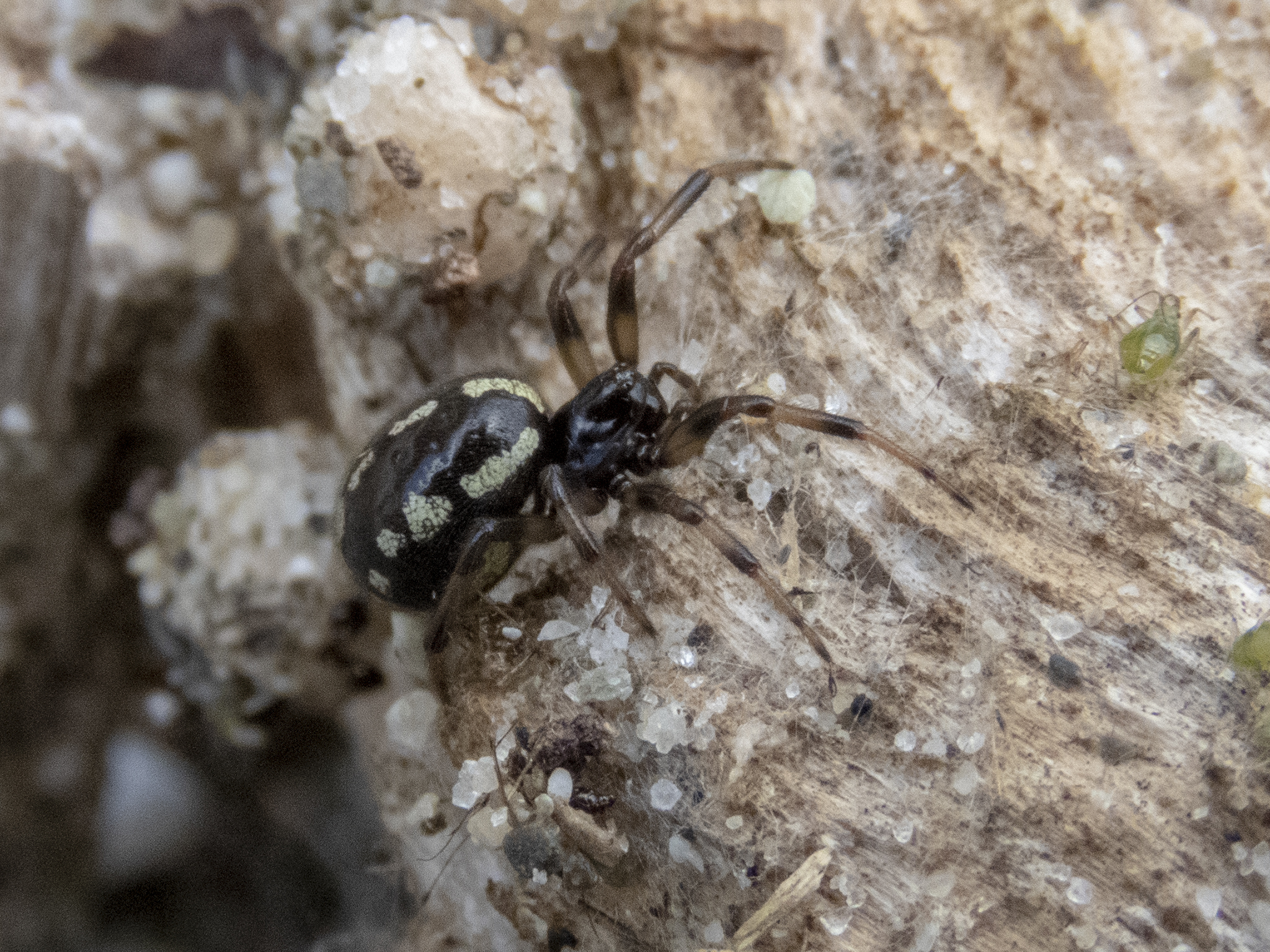
Steatoda lepida

=== Theridiidae ===
- Argyrodes antipodianus O. Pickard-Cambridge, 1880
- Argyrodes lepidus O. Pickard-Cambridge, 1880
- Ariamnes triangulatus Urquhart, 1887
- Coleosoma octomaculatum (Bösenberg & Strand, 1906)
- Cryptachaea blattea (Urquhart, 1886)
- Cryptachaea gigantipes (Keyserling, 1890)
- Cryptachaea veruculata (Urquhart, 1886)
- Episinus antipodianus O. Pickard-Cambridge, 1880
- Episinus similanus Urquhart, 1893
- Episinus similitudus Urquhart, 1893
- Euryopis nana (O. Pickard-Cambridge, 1880)
- Icona alba Forster, 1955
- Icona drama Forster, 1964
- Latrodectus hasseltii Thorell 1870
- Latrodectus katipo Powell 1871
- Moneta conifera (Urquhart, 1887)
- Nesticodes rufipes (Lucas, 1846)
- Parasteatoda tepidariorum (C. L. Koch, 1841)
- Pholcomma antipodianum (Forster, 1955)
- Pholcomma hickmani Forster, 1964
- Pholcomma turbotti (Marples, 1956)
- Phoroncidia pukeiwa (Marples, 1955)
- Phoroncidia puketoru (Marples, 1955)
- Phoroncidia quadrata (O. Pickard-Cambridge, 1880)
- Phycosoma oecobioides O. Pickard-Cambridge, 1880
- Rhomphaea urquharti (Bryant, 1933)
- Steatoda capensis Hann, 1990
- Steatoda grossa (C. L. Koch, 1838)
- Steatoda lepida (O. Pickard-Cambridge, 1880)
- Steatoda nobilis (Thorell, 1875)
- Steatoda truncata (Urquhart, 1888)
- Theridion albocinctum Urquhart 1892
- Theridion ampliatum Urquhart 1892
- Theridion argentatulum Roewer 1942
- Theridion cruciferum Urquhart 1886
- Theridion flabelliferum Urquhart 1887
- Theridion gracilipes Urquhart 1889
- Theridion longicrure Marples 1956
- Theridion porphyreticum Urquhart 1889
- Theridion punicapunctatum Urquhart 1891
- Theridion squalidum Urquhart 1886
- Theridion viridanum Urquhart 1887
- Theridion zantholabio Urquhart 1886

=== Megadictynidae ===
- Forstertyna marplesi (Forster, 1970)
- Megadictyna thilenii Dahl, 1906

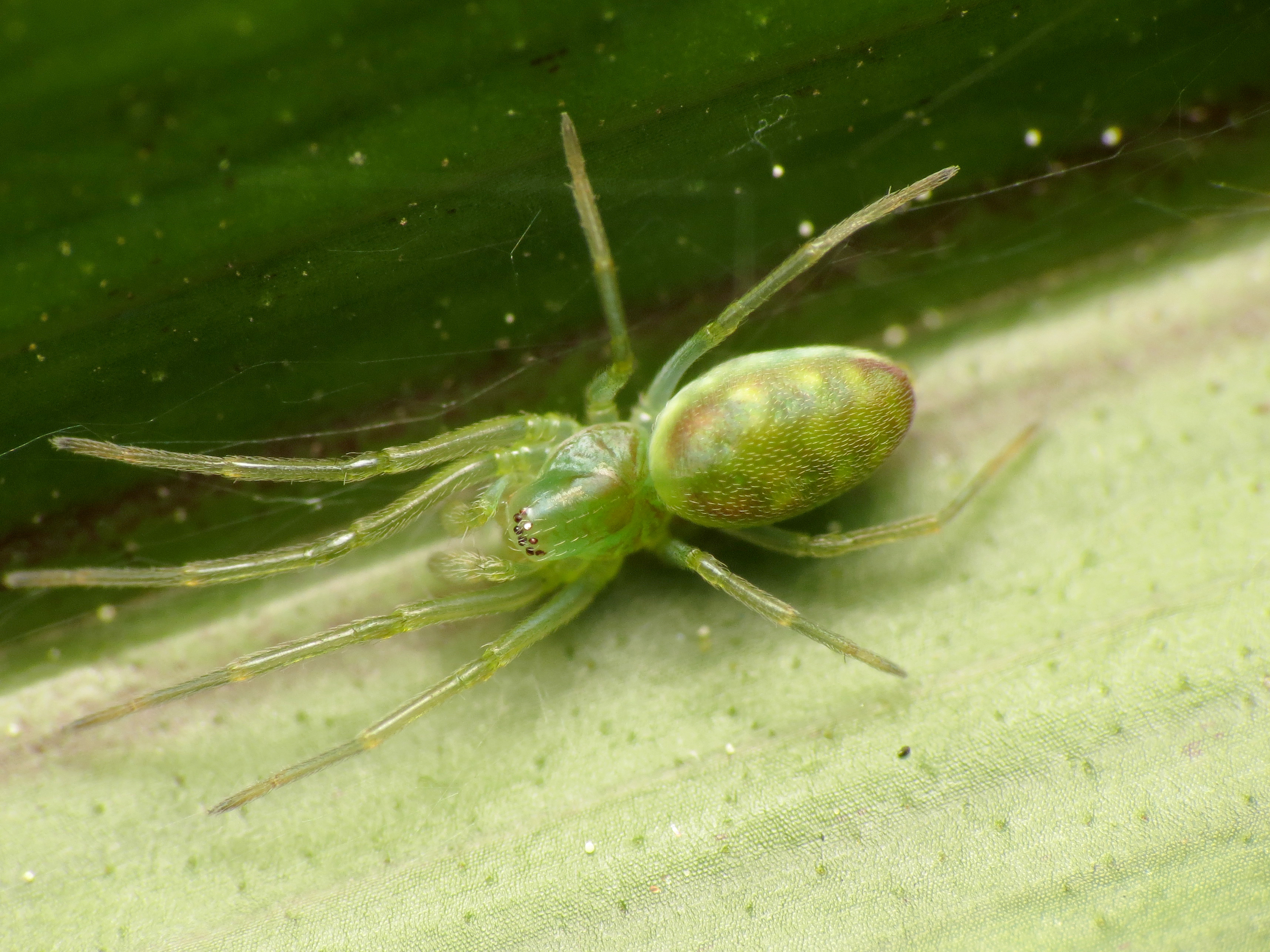
Paradictyna sp

=== Dictynidae ===
- Arangina cornigera (Dalmas, 1917)
- Arangina pluva Forster, 1970
- Paradictyna ilamia Forster, 1970
- Paradictyna rufoflava (Chamberlain, 1946)
- Paratheuma draneyi Berry, 2024
- Viridictyna australis Forster, 1970
- Viridictyna kikkawai Forster, 1970
- Viridictyna nelsonensis Forster, 1970
- Viridictyna parva Forster, 1970
- Viridictyna picata Forster, 1970

=== Hahniidae ===
- Alistra centralis (Forster, 1970)
- Alistra inanga (Forster, 1970)
- Alistra mangareia (Forster, 1970)
- Alistra napua (Forster, 1970)
- Alistra opina (Forster, 1970)
- Alistra reinga (Forster, 1970)
- Alistra tuna (Forster, 1970)
- Kapanga alta Forster, 1970
- Kapanga festiva Forster, 1970
- Kapanga grana Forster, 1970
- Kapanga hickmani (Forster, 1964)
- Kapanga isulata (Forster, 1970)
- Kapanga luana Forster, 1970
- Kapanga mana Forster, 1970
- Kapanga manga Forster, 1970
- Kapanga solitaria (Bryant, 1935)
- Kapanga wiltoni Forster, 1970
- Porioides rima (Forster, 1970)
- Porioides tasmani (Forster, 1970)
- Rinawa bola Forster, 1970
- Rinawa cantuaria Forster, 1970
- Rinawa otagoensis Forster, 1970
- Rinawa pula Forster, 1970
- Scotospilus divisus (Forster, 1970)
- Scotospilus nelsonensis (Forster, 1970)
- Scotospilus plenus (Forster, 1970)
- Scotospilus westlandicus (Forster, 1970)

=== Zodariidae ===
- Forsterella faceta Jocqué, 1991

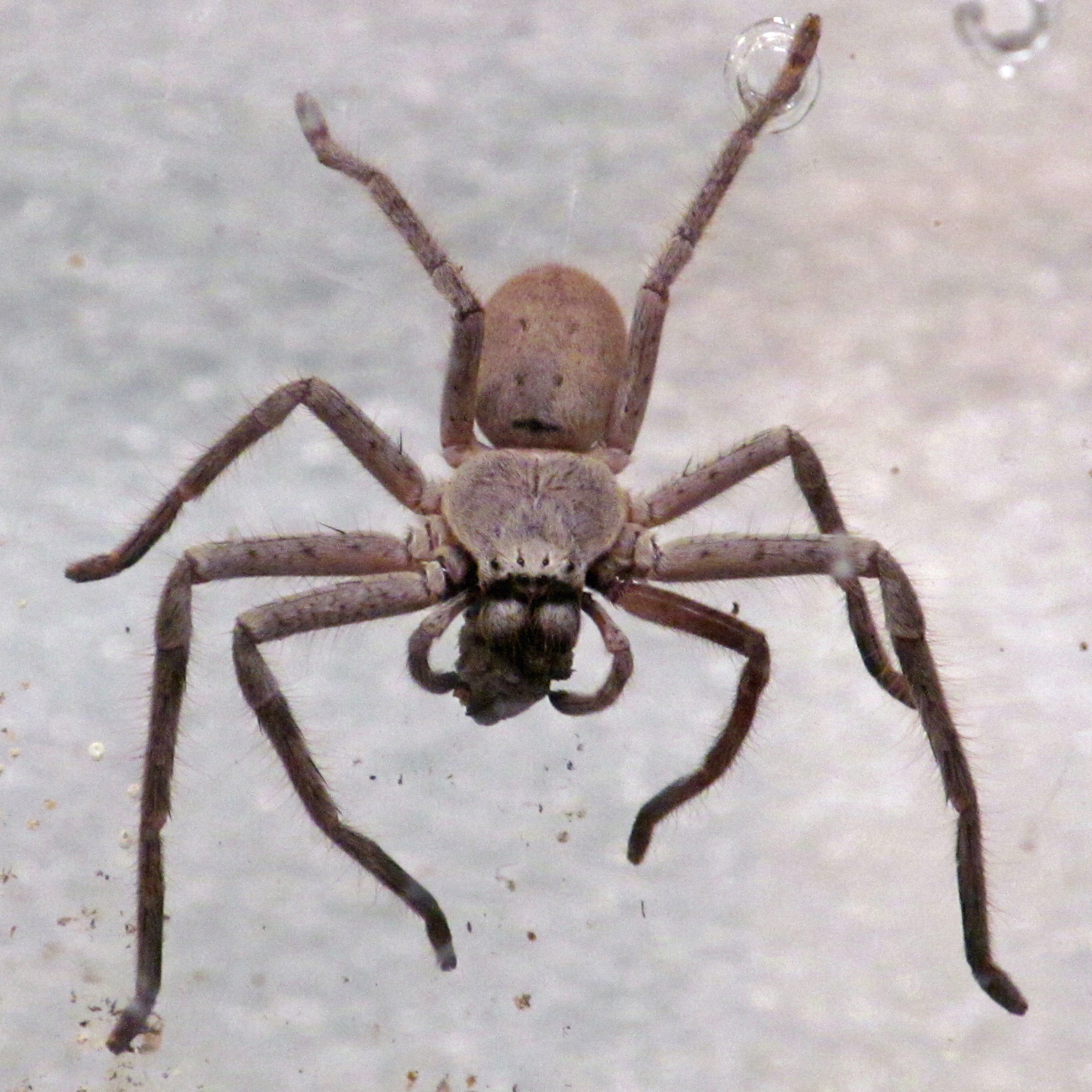
Isopeda villosa

=== Sparassidae ===
- Delena cancerides Walckenaer, 1837
- Heteropoda venatoria (Linnaeus, 1767)
- Isopeda villosa L. Koch, 1875
- Isopedella victorialis Hirst, 1993
- Pandercetes peronianus (Walckenaer, 1837)

=== Anyphaenidae ===
- Amaurobioides major Forster, 1970
- Amaurobioides maritima O. Pickard-Cambridge, 1883
- Amaurobioides minor Forster, 1970
- Amaurobioides pallida Forster, 1970
- Amaurobioides picuna Forster, 1970
- Amaurobioides piscator Hogg, 1909
- Amaurobioides pleta Forster, 1970
- Amaurobioides pohara Forster, 1970

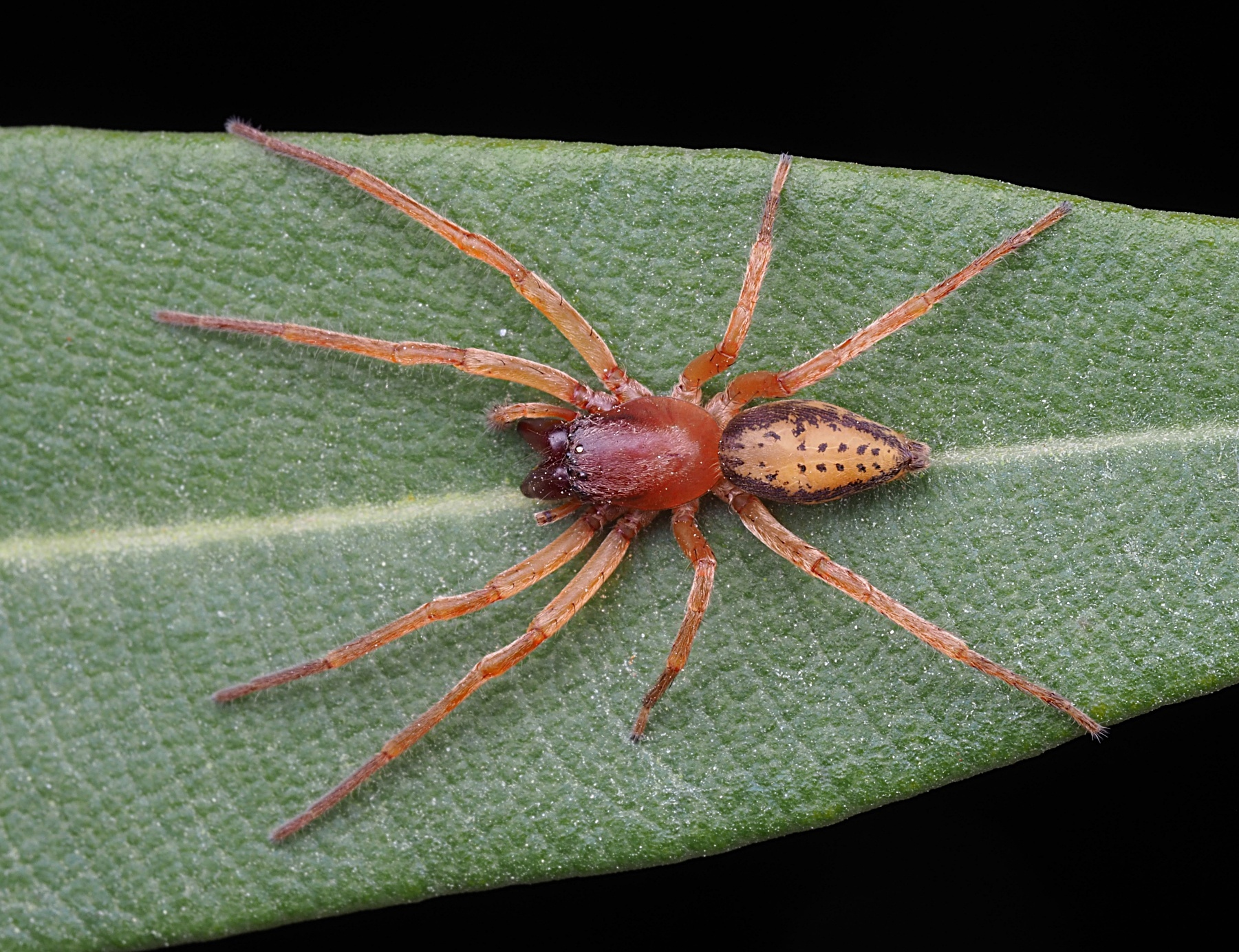
Clubiona

=== Clubionidae ===
- Clubiona blesti Forster, 1979
- Clubiona cada Forster, 1979
- Clubiona cambridgei L. Koch, 1873
- Clubiona chathamensis Simon, 1905
- Clubiona clima Forster, 1979
- Clubiona consensa Forster, 1979
- Clubiona contrita Forster, 1979
- Clubiona convoluta Forster, 1979
- Clubiona delicata Forster, 1979
- Clubiona huttoni Forster, 1979
- Clubiona peculiaris L. Koch, 1873
- Clubiona producta Forster, 1979
- Clubiona scatula Forster, 1979
- Clubiona torta Forster, 1979

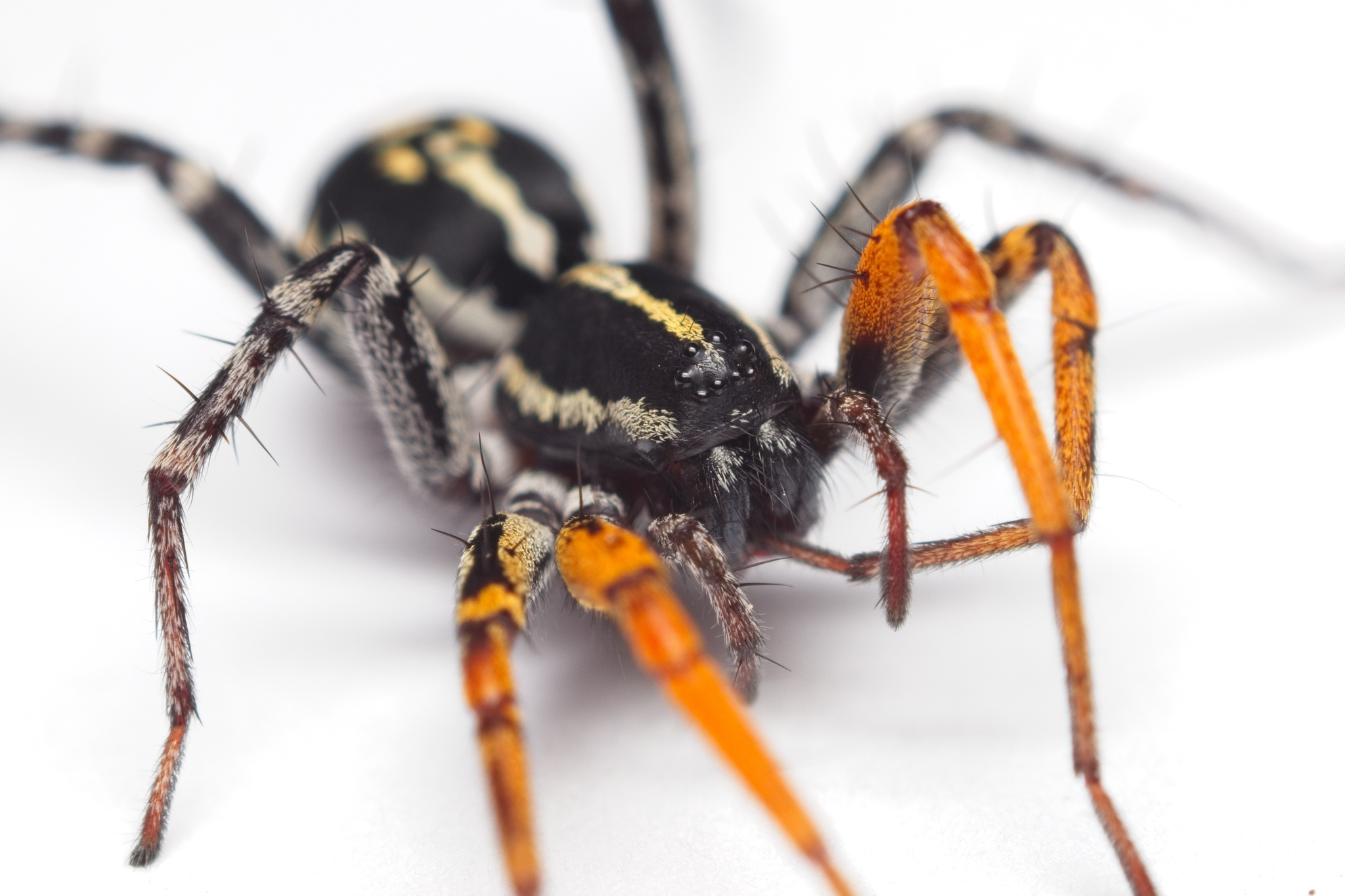
Nyssus coloripes

=== Corinnidae ===
- Nyssus albopunctatus (Hogg, 1896)
- Nyssus coloripes Walckenaer, 1805

=== Zoridae ===
- Argoctenus aureus (Hogg, 1911)

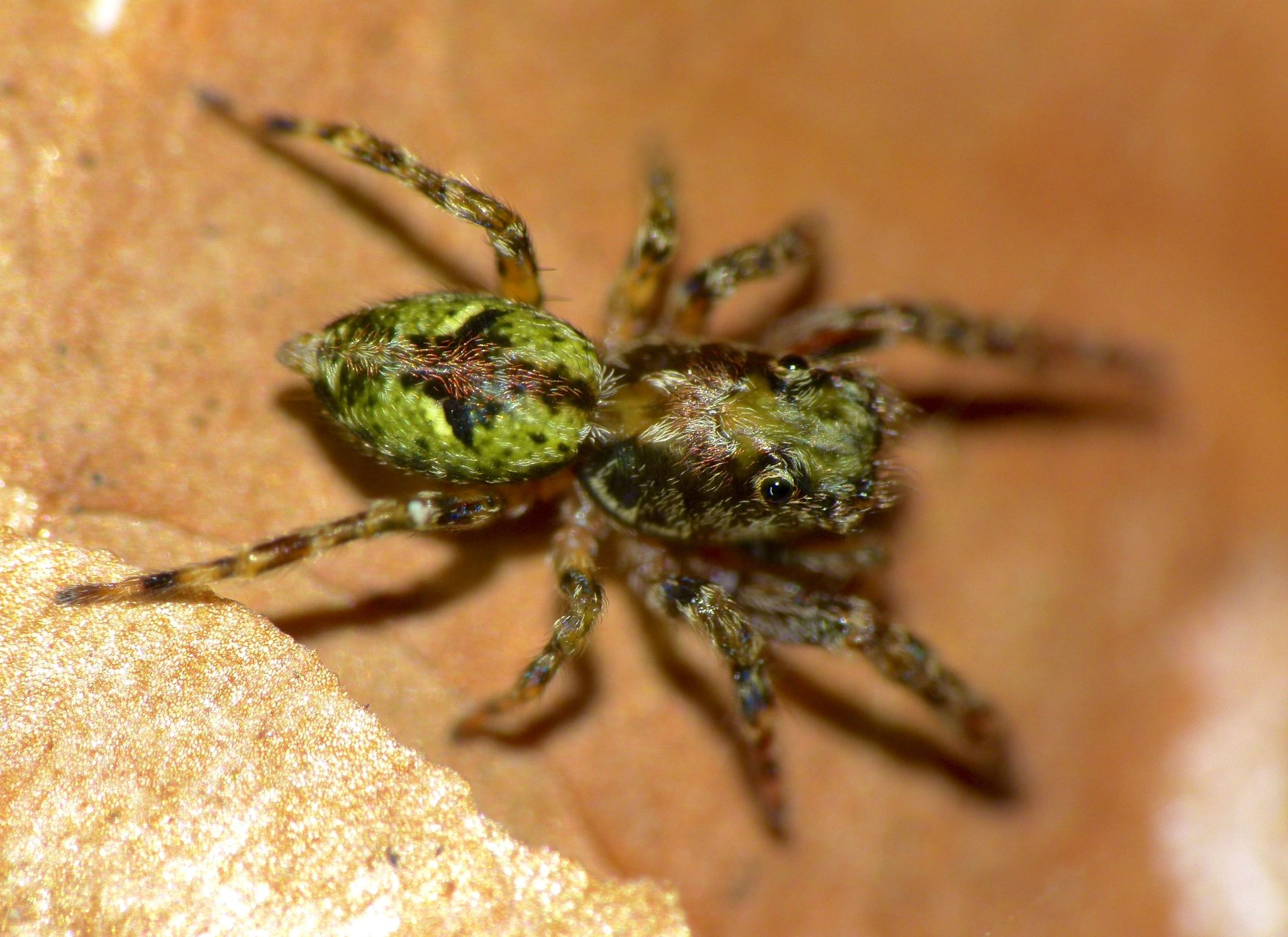
Hinewaia embolica

=== Salticidae ===
- Adoxotoma forsteri Żabka, 2004
- Bianor compactus (Urquhart, 1885)
- Bianor maculatus (Keyserling, 1883)
- Clynotis archeyi (Berland, 1931)
- Clynotis barresi Hogg, 1909
- Clynotis knoxi Forster, 1964
- Clynotis saxatilis (Urquhart, 1886)
- Hakka himeshimensis (Dönitz & Strand, 1906)
- Hasarius adansoni (Audouin, 1826)
- Helpis minitabunda (L. Koch, 1880)
- Hinewaia embolica Zabka & Pollard, 2002
- Holoplatys apressus (Powell, 1873)
- Jotus ravus (Urquhart, 1893)
- Laufeia aerihirta (Urquhart, 1888)
- Maratus griseus (Keyserling, 1882)
- Maratus marinus (Goyen, 1892)
- Maratus scutulatus (L. Koch, 1881)
- Marpissa armifera Urquhart, 1892
- Ocrisiona cinerea (L. Koch, 1879)
- Ocrisiona leucocomis (L. Koch, 1879)
- Ourea alpinus Long, Vink & Paterson, 2025
- Ourea cyanofemorus Long, Vink & Paterson, 2025
- Ourea kohatu Long, Vink & Paterson, 2025
- Ourea kowhai Long, Vink & Paterson, 2025
- Ourea marmoratus Long, Vink & Paterson, 2025
- Ourea mauka Long, Vink & Paterson, 2025
- Ourea occidentalis Long, Vink & Paterson, 2025
- Ourea otagoensis Long, Vink & Paterson, 2025
- Ourea paparoa Long, Vink & Paterson, 2025
- Ourea petroides Long, Vink & Paterson, 2025
- Ourea saffroclypeus Long, Vink & Paterson, 2025
- Ourea striatops Long, Vink & Paterson, 2025
- Trite auricoma (Urquhart, 1886)
- Trite herbigrada (Urquhart, 1889)
- Trite mustilina (Powell, 1873)
- Trite parvula (Bryant, 1935)
- Trite planiceps Simon, 1899
- Trite pollardi Patoleta & Żabka, 2017
- Trite urvillei (Dalmas, 1917)

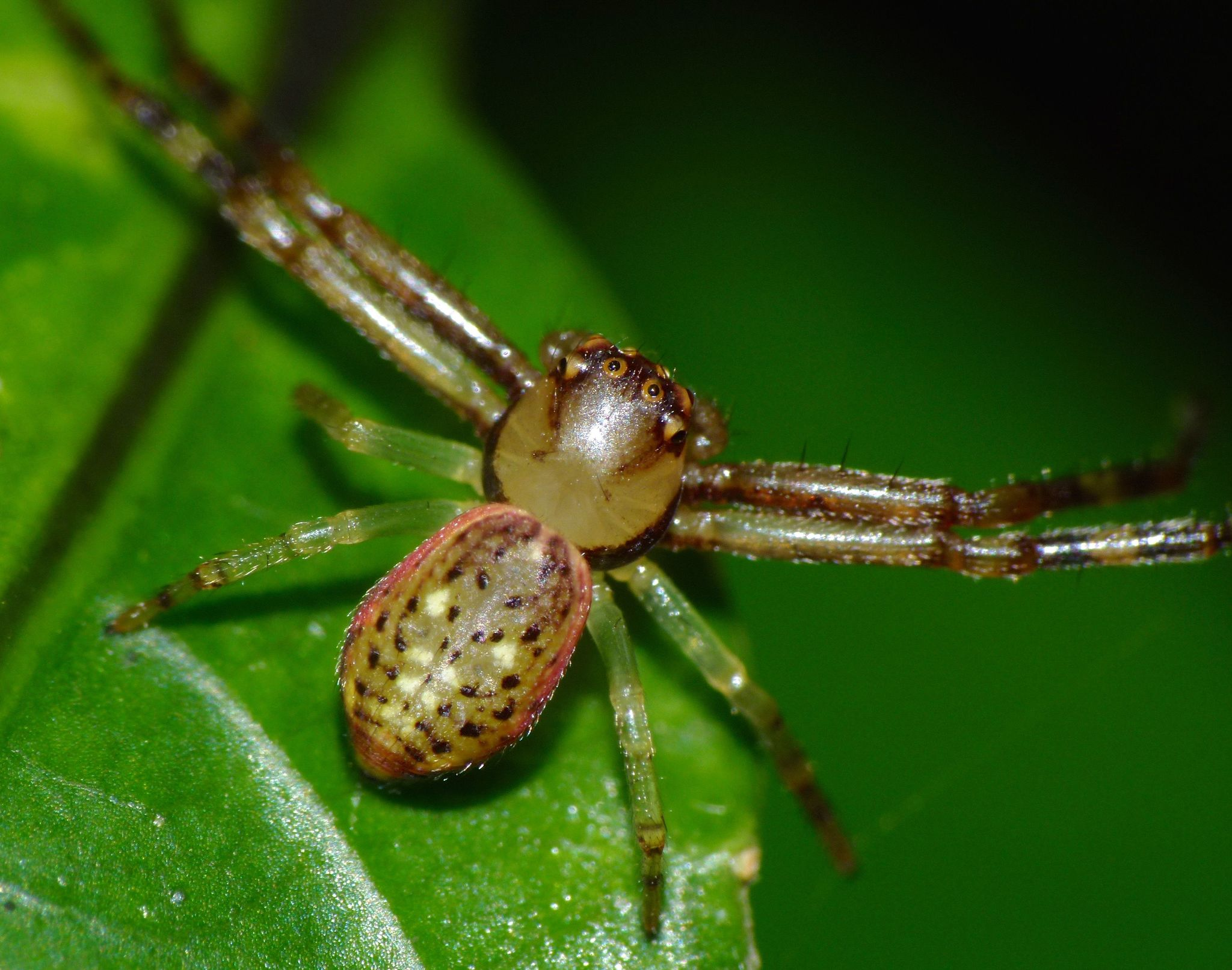
Diaea sp

=== Thomisidae ===
- Cymbachina albobrunnea (Urquhart, 1893)
- Diaea albolimbata L. Koch, 1875
- Diaea ambara (Urquhart, 1885)
- Diaea sphaeroides (Urquhart, 1885)
- Sidymella angularis (Urquhart, 1885)
- Sidymella angulata (Urquhart, 1885)
- Sidymella benhami (Hogg, 1910)
- Synema suteri Dahl, 1907

=== Lamponidae ===
- Lampona cylindrata (L. Koch, 1866)
- Lampona murina L. Koch, 1873

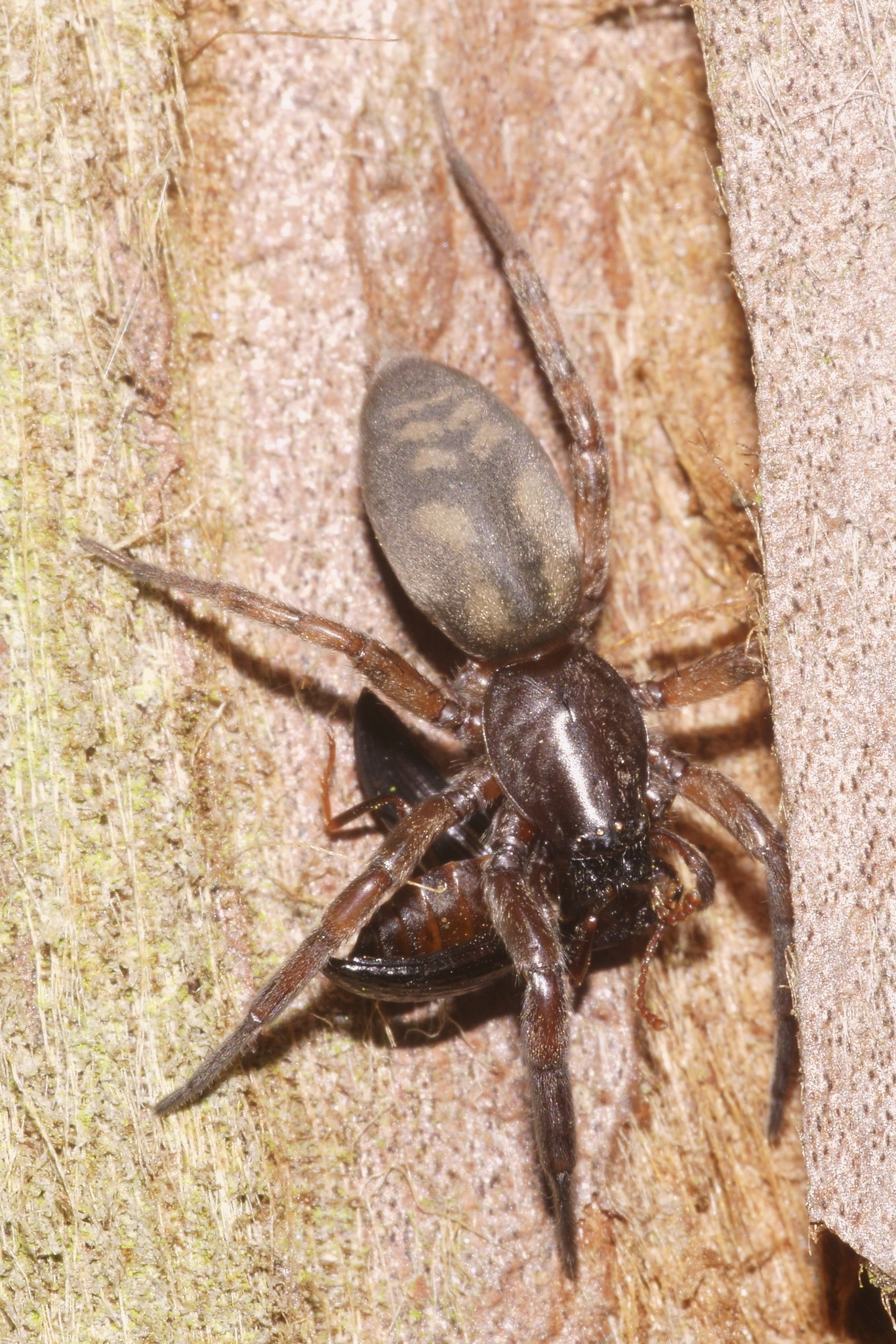
Intruda signata

=== Gnaphosidae ===
- Anzacia gemmea (Dalmas, 1917)
- Hemicloea rogenhoferi L. Koch, 1875
- Hemicloea sundevalli Thorell, 1870
- Hypodrassodes apicus Forster, 1979
- Hypodrassodes courti Forster, 1979
- Hypodrassodes crassus Forster, 1979
- Hypodrassodes dalmasi Forster, 1979
- Hypodrassodes insulanus Forster, 1979
- Hypodrassodes isopus Forster, 1979
- Hypodrassodes maoricus (Dalmas, 1917)
- Intruda signata (Hogg, 1900)
- Kaitawa insulare (Marples, 1956)
- Matua festiva Forster, 1979
- Matua valida Forster, 1979
- Nauhea tapa Forster, 1979
- Notiodrassus distinctus Bryant, 1935
- Notiodrassus fiordensis Forster, 1979
- Scotophaeus pretiosus (L. Koch, 1873)
- Zelanda elongata (Forster, 1979)
- Zelanda erebus (L. Koch, 1873)
- Zelanda kaituna (Forster, 1979)
- Zelanda miranda (Forster, 1979)
- Zelanda obtusa (Forster, 1979)
- Zelanda titirangia (Ovtsharenko, Fedoryak & Zakharov, 2006)

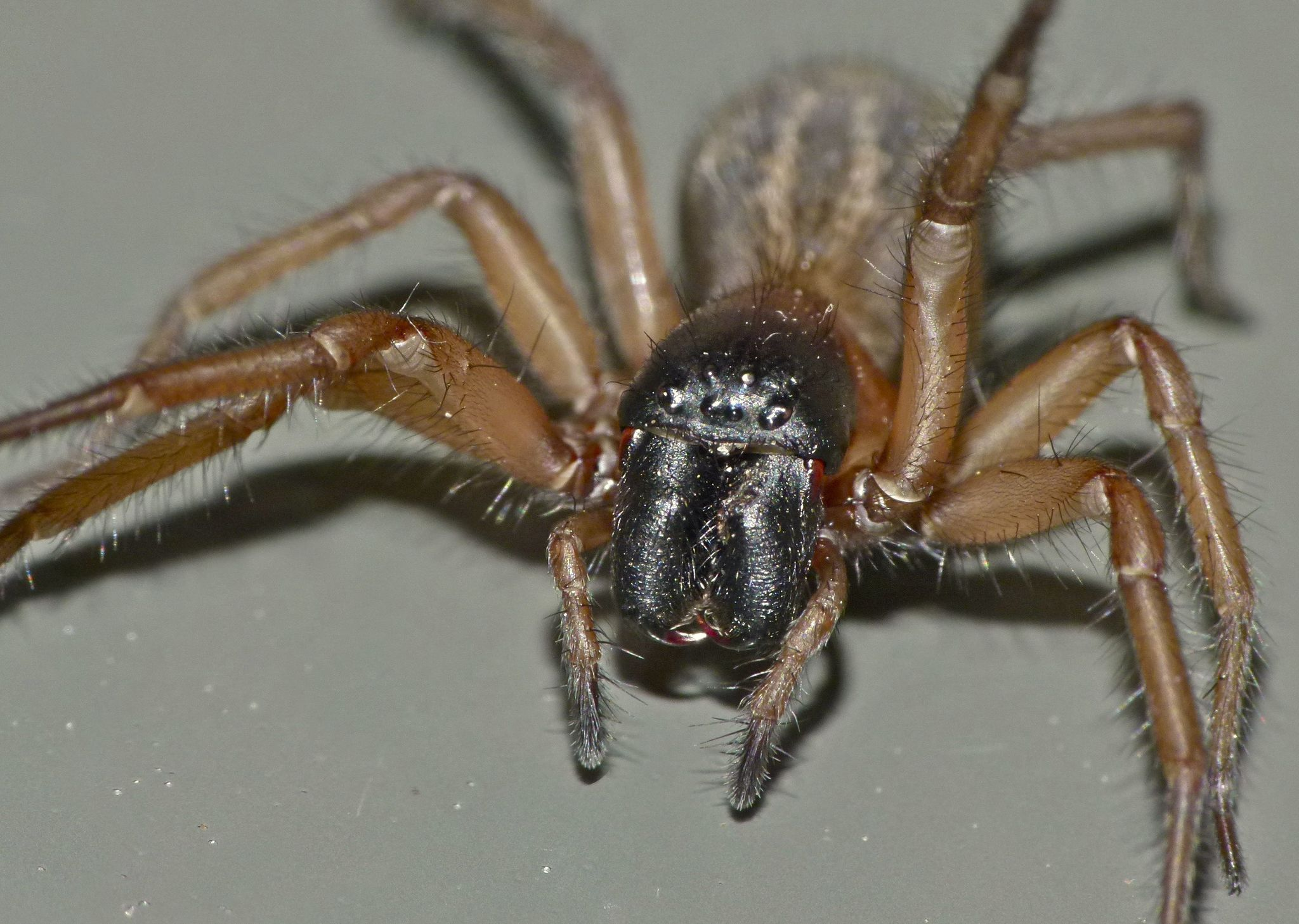
Neoramia sp

=== Stiphidiidae ===
- Aorangia agama Forster & Wilton, 1973
- Aorangia ansa Forster & Wilton, 1973
- Aorangia fiordensis Forster & Wilton, 1973
- Aorangia isolata Forster & Wilton, 1973
- Aorangia kapitiensis Forster & Wilton, 1973
- Aorangia mauii Forster & Wilton, 1973
- Aorangia muscicola Forster & Wilton, 1973
- Aorangia obscura Forster & Wilton, 1973
- Aorangia otira Forster & Wilton, 1973
- Aorangia pilgrimi Forster & Wilton, 1973
- Aorangia poppelwelli Forster & Wilton, 1973
- Aorangia pudica Forster & Wilton, 1973
- Aorangia semita Forster & Wilton, 1973
- Aorangia silvestris Forster & Wilton, 1973
- Aorangia singularis Forster & Wilton, 1973
- Aorangia tumida Forster & Wilton, 1973
- Procambridgea grayi Davies, 2001
- Stiphidion facetum Simon, 1902
- Marplesia dugdalei Forster & Wilton, 1973
- Marplesia pohara Forster & Wilton, 1973
- Neolana dalmasi (Marples, 1959)
- Neolana pallida Forster & Wilton, 1973
- Neolana septentrionalis Forster & Wilton, 1973
- Neoramia allanae Forster & Wilton, 1973
- Neoramia alta Forster & Wilton, 1973
- Neoramia charybdis (Hogg, 1910)
- Neoramia childi Forster & Wilton, 1973
- Neoramia crucifera (Hogg, 1909)
- Neoramia finschi (L. Koch, 1872)
- Neoramia fiordensis Forster & Wilton, 1973
- Neoramia hoggi (Forster, 1964)
- Neoramia hokina Forster & Wilton, 1973
- Neoramia janus (Bryant, 1935)
- Neoramia koha Forster & Wilton, 1973
- Neoramia komata Forster & Wilton, 1973
- Neoramia mamoea Forster & Wilton, 1973
- Neoramia marama Forster & Wilton, 1973
- Neoramia margaretae Forster & Wilton, 1973
- Neoramia matua Forster & Wilton, 1973
- Neoramia minuta Forster & Wilton, 1973
- Neoramia nana Forster & Wilton, 1973
- Neoramia oroua Forster & Wilton, 1973
- Neoramia otagoa Forster & Wilton, 1973
- Neoramia raua Forster & Wilton, 1973
- Neoramia setosa (Bryant, 1935)

=== Agelenidae ===
- Ahua dentata Forster & Wilton, 1973
- Ahua insula Forster & Wilton, 1973
- Ahua kaituna Forster & Wilton, 1973
- Ahua vulgaris Forster & Wilton, 1973
- Huka alba Forster & Wilton, 1973
- Huka lobata Forster & Wilton, 1973
- Huka minima Forster & Wilton, 1973
- Huka minuta Forster & Wilton, 1973
- Huka pallida Forster & Wilton, 1973
- Mahura accola Forster & Wilton, 1973
- Mahura bainhamensis Forster & Wilton, 1973
- Mahura boara Forster & Wilton, 1973
- Mahura crypta Forster & Wilton, 1973
- Mahura detrita Forster & Wilton, 1973
- Mahura hinua Forster & Wilton, 1973
- Mahura musca Forster & Wilton, 1973
- Mahura rubella Forster & Wilton, 1973
- Mahura rufula Forster & Wilton, 1973
- Mahura scuta Forster & Wilton, 1973
- Mahura sorenseni Forster & Wilton, 1973
- Mahura southgatei Forster & Wilton, 1973
- Mahura spinosa Forster & Wilton, 1973
- Mahura spinosoides Forster & Wilton, 1973
- Mahura takahea Forster & Wilton, 1973
- Mahura tarsa Forster & Wilton, 1973
- Mahura turris Forster & Wilton, 1973
- Mahura vella Forster & Wilton, 1973
- Neorepukia hama Forster & Wilton, 1973
- Neorepukia pilama Forster & Wilton, 1973
- Oramia chathamensis (Simon, 1899)
- Oramia littoralis Forster & Wilton, 1973
- Oramia mackerrowi (Marples, 1959)
- Oramia marplesi Forster, 1964
- Oramia occidentalis (Marples, 1959)
- Oramia rubrioides (Hogg, 1909)
- Oramia solanderensis Forster & Wilton, 1973
- Oramiella wisei Forster & Wilton, 1973
- Paramyro apicus Forster & Wilton, 1973
- Paramyro parapicus Forster & Wilton, 1973
- Porotaka detrita Forster & Wilton, 1973
- Porotaka florae Forster & Wilton, 1973
- Tararua celeripes (Urquhart, 1891)
- Tararua clara Forster & Wilton, 1973
- Tararua diversa Forster & Wilton, 1973
- Tararua foordi Forster & Wilton, 1973
- Tararua puna Forster & Wilton, 1973
- Tararua ratuma Forster & Wilton, 1973
- Tararua versuta Forster & Wilton, 1973
- Tegenaria domestica (Clerck, 1757)
- Tuapoka cavata Forster & Wilton, 1973
- Tuapoka ovalis Forster & Wilton, 1973

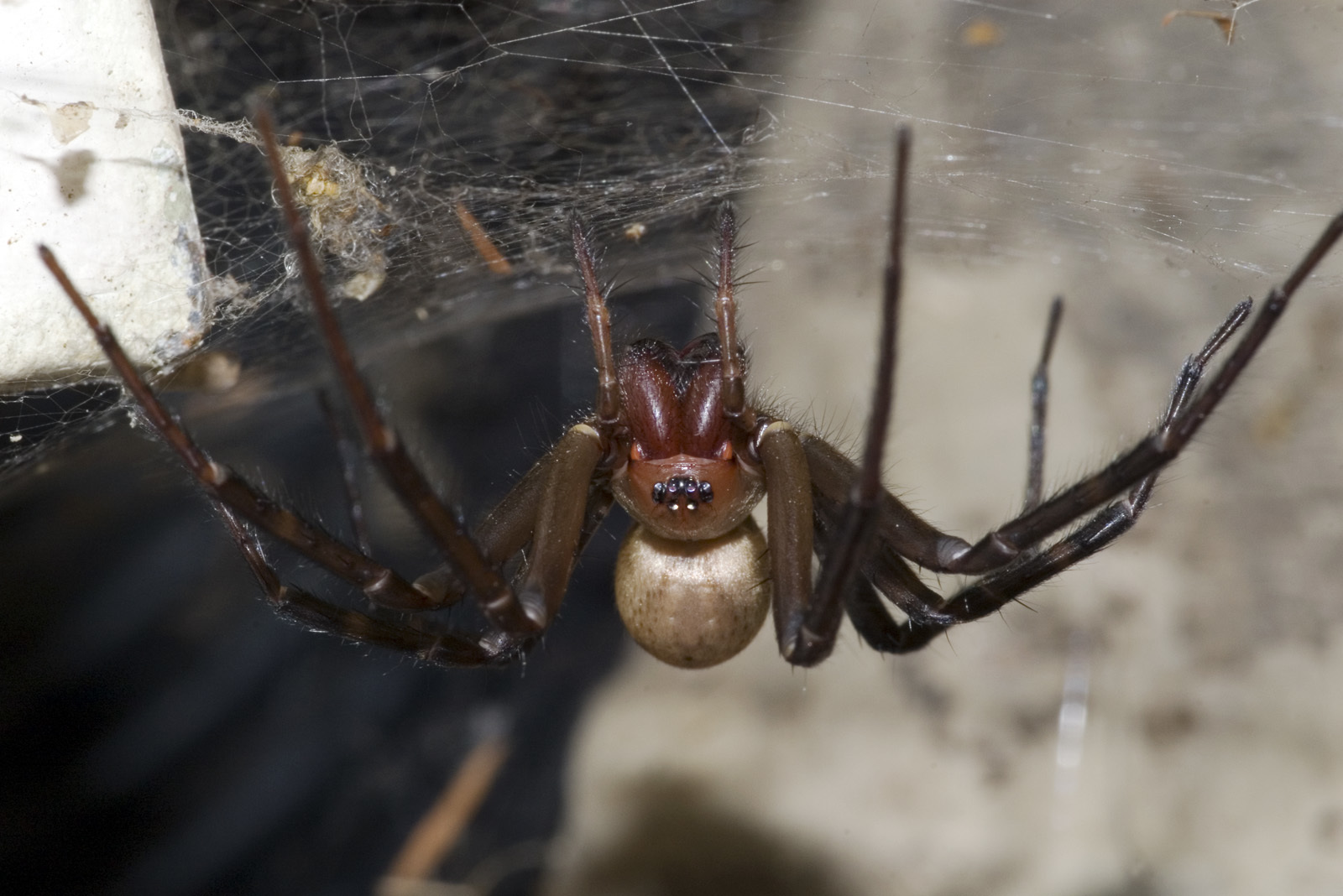
Cambridgea sp

=== Desidae ===
- Akatorea gracilis (Marples, 1959)
- Akatorea otagoensis Forster & Wilton, 1973
- Amphinecta decemmaculata Simon, 1898
- Amphinecta dejecta Forster & Wilton, 1973
- Amphinecta luta Forster & Wilton, 1973
- Amphinecta mara Forster & Wilton, 1973
- Amphinecta milina Forster & Wilton, 1973
- Amphinecta mula Forster & Wilton, 1973
- Amphinecta pika Forster & Wilton, 1973
- Amphinecta pila Forster & Wilton, 1973
- Amphinecta puka Forster & Wilton, 1973
- Amphinecta tama Forster & Wilton, 1973
- Amphinecta tula Forster & Wilton, 1973
- Badumna insignis (L. Koch, 1872)
- Badumna longinqua (L. Koch, 1867)
- Cambridgea agrestis Forster & Wilton, 1973
- Cambridgea ambigua Blest & Vink, 2000
- Cambridgea annulata Dalmas, 1917
- Cambridgea antipodiana (White, 1849)
- Cambridgea arboricola (Urquhart, 1891)
- Cambridgea australis Blest & Vink, 2000
- Cambridgea decorata Blest & Vink, 2000
- Cambridgea elegans Blest & Vink, 2000
- Cambridgea elongata Blest & Vink, 2000
- Cambridgea fasciata L. Koch, 1872
- Cambridgea foliata (L. Koch, 1872)
- Cambridgea inaequalis Blest & Vink, 2000
- Cambridgea insulana Blest & Vink, 2000
- Cambridgea longipes Blest & Vink, 2000
- Cambridgea mercurialis Blest & Vink, 2000
- Cambridgea obscura Blest & Vink, 2000
- Cambridgea occidentalis Forster & Wilton, 1973
- Cambridgea ordishi Blest & Vink, 2000
- Cambridgea pallidula Blest & Vink, 2000
- Cambridgea peculiaris Forster & Wilton, 1973
- Cambridgea peelensis Blest & Vink, 2000
- Cambridgea plagiata Forster & Wilton, 1973
- Cambridgea quadromaculata Blest & Taylor, 1995
- Cambridgea ramsayi Forster & Wilton, 1973
- Cambridgea reinga Forster & Wilton, 1973
- Cambridgea secunda Forster & Wilton, 1973
- Cambridgea solanderensis Blest & Vink, 2000
- Cambridgea sylvatica Forster & Wilton, 1973
- Cambridgea tuiae Blest & Vink, 2000
- Cambridgea turbotti Forster & Wilton, 1973
- Desis marina (Hector, 1877)
- Dunstanoides angustiae (Marples, 1959)
- Dunstanoides hesperis (Forster & Wilton, 1973)
- Dunstanoides hinawa (Forster & Wilton, 1973)
- Dunstanoides hova (Forster & Wilton, 1973)
- Dunstanoides kochi (Forster & Wilton, 1973)
- Dunstanoides mirus (Forster & Wilton, 1973)
- Dunstanoides montana (Forster & Wilton, 1973)
- Dunstanoides nuntia (Marples, 1959)
- Dunstanoides salmoni (Forster & Wilton, 1973)
- Goyenia electa Forster, 1970
- Goyenia fresa Forster, 1970
- Goyenia gratiosa Forster, 1970
- Goyenia lucrosa Forster, 1970
- Goyenia marplesi Forster, 1970
- Goyenia multidentata Forster, 1970
- Goyenia ornata Forster, 1970
- Goyenia sana Forster, 1970
- Goyenia scitula Forster, 1970
- Goyenia sylvatica Forster, 1970
- Helsonia plata Forster, 1970
- Holomamoea foveata Forster & Wilton, 1973
- Huara antarctica (Berland, 1931)
- Huara chapmanae Forster & Wilton, 1973
- Huara decorata Forster & Wilton, 1973
- Huara dolosa Forster & Wilton, 1973
- Huara grossa Forster, 1964
- Huara hastata Forster & Wilton, 1973
- Huara inflata Forster & Wilton, 1973
- Huara kikkawa Forster & Wilton, 1973
- Huara marplesi Forster & Wilton, 1973
- Huara mura Forster & Wilton, 1973
- Huara ovalis (Hogg, 1909)
- Huara pudica Forster & Wilton, 1973
- Ischalea spinipes L. Koch, 1872
- Makora calypso (Marples, 1959)
- Makora detrita Forster & Wilton, 1973
- Makora diversa Forster & Wilton, 1973
- Makora figurata Forster & Wilton, 1973
- Makora mimica Forster & Wilton, 1973
- Mamoea assimilis Forster & Wilton, 1973
- Mamoea bicolor (Bryant, 1935)
- Mamoea cantuaria Forster & Wilton, 1973
- Mamoea cooki Forster & Wilton, 1973
- Mamoea florae Forster & Wilton, 1973
- Mamoea grandiosa Forster & Wilton, 1973
- Mamoea hesperis Forster & Wilton, 1973
- Mamoea hughsoni Forster & Wilton, 1973
- Mamoea inornata Forster & Wilson, 1973
- Mamoea mandibularis (Bryant, 1935)
- Mamoea maorica Forster & Wilton, 1973
- Mamoea montana Forster & Wilton, 1973
- Mamoea monticola Forster & Wilton, 1973
- Mamoea otira Forster & Wilton, 1973
- Mamoea pilosa (Bryant, 1935)
- Mamoea rakiura Forster & Wilton, 1973
- Mamoea rufa (Berland, 1931)
- Mamoea unica Forster & Wilton, 1973
- Mamoea westlandica Forster & Wilton, 1973
- Mangareia maculata Forster, 1970
- Mangareia motu Forster, 1970
- Maniho australis Forster & Wilton, 1973
- Maniho cantuarius Forster & Wilton, 1973
- Maniho centralis Forster & Wilton, 1973
- Maniho insulanus Forster & Wilton, 1973
- Maniho meridionalis Forster & Wilton, 1973
- Maniho ngaitahu Forster & Wilton, 1973
- Maniho otagoensis Forster & Wilton, 1973
- Maniho pumilio Forster & Wilton, 1973
- Maniho tigris Marples, 1959
- Maniho vulgaris Forster & Wilton, 1973
- Matachia australis Forster, 1970
- Matachia livor (Urquhart, 1893)
- Matachia marplesi Forster, 1970
- Matachia ramulicola Dalmas, 1917
- Matachia similis Forster, 1970
- Mesudus frondosus (Forster, 1970)
- Mesudus setosus (Forster, 1970)
- Mesudus solitarius (Forster, 1970)
- Nanocambridgea gracilipes Forster & Wilton, 1973
- Neororea homerica Forster & Wilton, 1973
- Neororea sorenseni (Forster, 1955)
- Notomatachia cantuaria Forster, 1970
- Notomatachia hirsuta (Marples, 1962)
- Notomatachia wiltoni Forster, 1970
- Nuisiana arboris (Marples, 1959)
- Oparara karamea Forster & Wilton, 1973
- Oparara vallus (Marples, 1959)
- Panoa contorta Forster, 1970
- Panoa fiordensis Forster, 1970
- Panoa mora Forster, 1970
- Panoa tapanuiensis Forster, 1970
- Paramamoea aquilonalis Forster & Wilton, 1973
- Paramamoea arawa Forster & Wilton, 1973
- Paramamoea incerta Forster & Wilton, 1973
- Paramamoea incertoides Forster & Wilton, 1973
- Paramamoea insulana Forster & Wilton, 1973
- Paramamoea pandora Forster & Wilton, 1973
- Paramamoea paradisica Forster & Wilton, 1973
- Paramamoea parva Forster & Wilton, 1973
- Paramamoea urewera Forster & Wilton, 1973
- Paramamoea waipoua Forster & Wilton, 1973
- Poaka graminicola Forster & Wilton, 1973
- Rapua australis Forster, 1970
- Rangitata peelensis Forster & Wilton, 1973
- Reinga apica Forster & Wilton, 1973
- Reinga aucklandensis (Marples, 1959)
- Reinga grossa Forster & Wilton, 1973
- Reinga media Forster & Wilton, 1973
- Reinga waipoua Forster & Wilton, 1973
- Rorea aucklandensis Forster & Wilton, 1973
- Rorea otagoensis Forster & Wilton, 1973
- Tuakana mirada Forster, 1970
- Tuakana wiltoni Forster, 1970
- Waterea cornigera Forster & Wilton, 1973

=== Toxopidae ===
- Gasparia busa Forster, 1970
- Gasparia coriacea Forster, 1970
- Gasparia delli (Forster, 1955)
- Gasparia dentata Forster, 1970
- Gasparia edwardsi Forster, 1970
- Gasparia kaiangaroa Forster, 1970
- Gasparia littoralis Forster, 1970
- Gasparia lomasi Forster, 1970
- Gasparia mangamuka Forster, 1970
- Gasparia manneringi (Forster, 1964)
- Gasparia montana Forster, 1970
- Gasparia nava Forster, 1970
- Gasparia nebulosa Marples, 1956
- Gasparia nelsonensis Forster, 1970
- Gasparia nuntia Forster, 1970
- Gasparia oparara Forster, 1970
- Gasparia parva Forster, 1970
- Gasparia pluta Forster, 1970
- Gasparia rupicola Forster, 1970
- Gasparia rustica Forster, 1970
- Gasparia tepakia Forster, 1970
- Gasparia tuaiensis Forster, 1970
- Gohia clarki Forster, 1964
- Gohia falxiata (Hogg, 1909)
- Gohia isolata Forster, 1970
- Gohia parisolata Forster, 1970
- Hulua convoluta Forster & Wilton, 1973
- Hulua manga Forster & Wilton, 1973
- Hulua minima Forster & Wilton, 1973
- Hulua pana Forster & Wilton, 1973
- Lamina minor Forster, 1970
- Lamina montana Forster, 1970
- Lamina parana Forster, 1970
- Lamina ulva Forster, 1970
- Myro marinus (Goyen, 1890)
- Neomyro amplius Forster & Wilton, 1973
- Neomyro circe Forster & Wilton, 1973
- Neomyro scitulus (Urquhart, 1891)
- Otagoa chathamensis Forster, 1970
- Otagoa nova Forster, 1970
- Otagoa wiltoni Forster, 1970
- Hapona amira Forster, 1970
- Hapona aucklandensis (Forster, 1964)
- Hapona crypta (Forster, 1964)
- Hapona insula (Forster, 1964)
- Hapona marplesi (Forster, 1964)
- Hapona moana Forster, 1970
- Hapona momona Forster, 1970
- Hapona muscicola (Forster, 1964)
- Hapona otagoa (Forster, 1964)
- Hapona paihia Forster, 1970
- Hapona reinga Forster, 1970
- Hapona salmoni (Forster, 1964)
- Hapona tararua Forster, 1970
- Laestrygones albiceris Urquhart, 1894
- Laestrygones chathamensis Forster, 1970
- Laestrygones minutissimus (Hogg, 1909)
- Laestrygones otagoensis Forster, 1970
- Laestrygones westlandicus Forster, 1970
- Toxopsoides huttoni Forster & Wilton, 1973

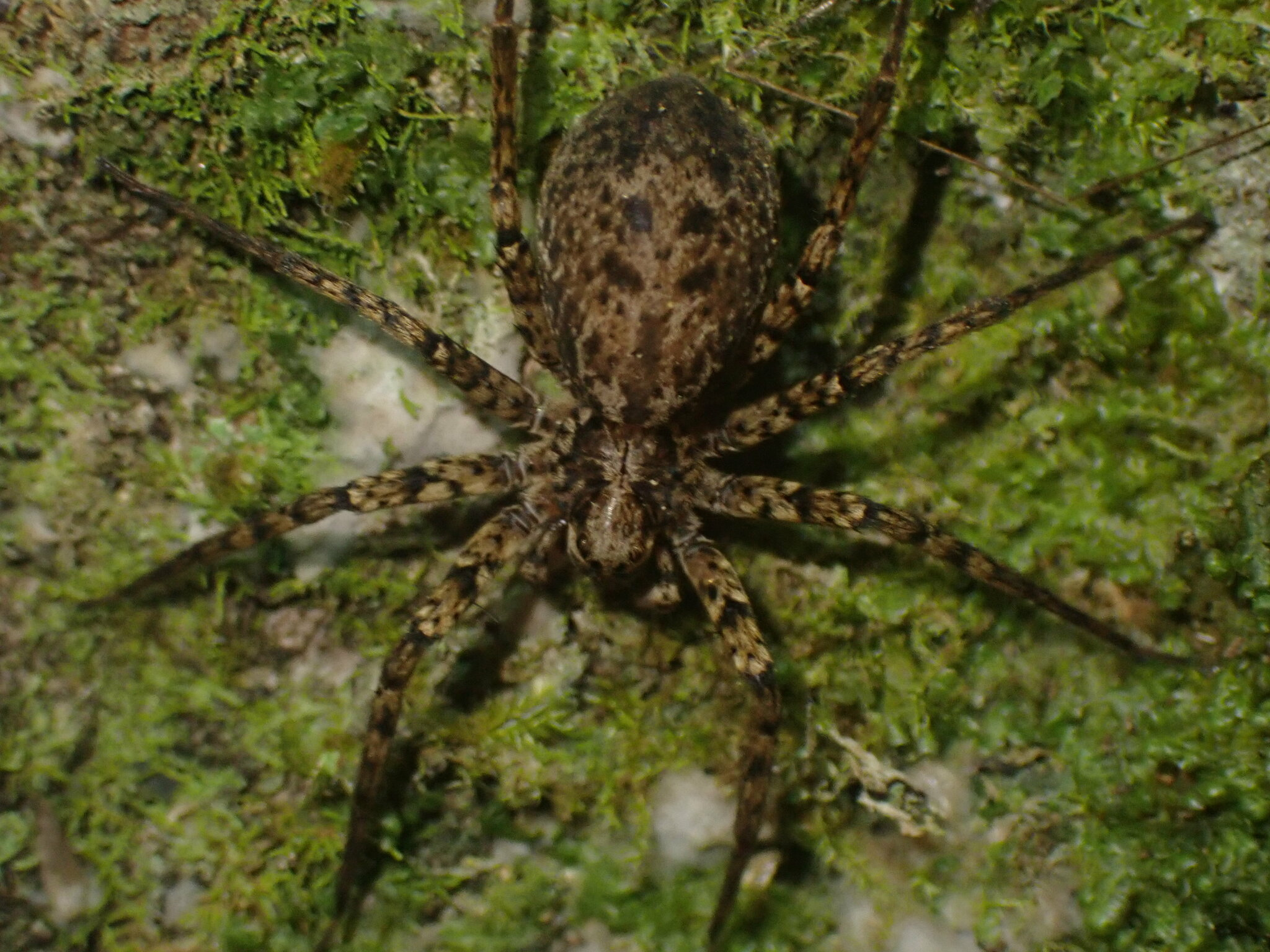
Cycloctenus pulcher

=== Cycloctenidae ===
- Cycloctenus agilis Forster, 1979
- Cycloctenus centralis Forster, 1979
- Cycloctenus duplex Forster, 1979
- Cycloctenus fiordensis Forster, 1979
- Cycloctenus fugax Goyen, 1890
- Cycloctenus lepidus Urquhart, 1890
- Cycloctenus nelsonensis Forster, 1979
- Cycloctenus paturau Forster, 1979
- Cycloctenus pulcher Urquhart, 1891
- Cycloctenus westlandicus Forster, 1964
- Orepukia alta Forster & Wilton, 1973
- Orepukia catlinensis Forster & Wilton, 1973
- Orepukia dugdalei Forster & Wilton, 1973
- Orepukia egmontensis Forster & Wilton, 1973
- Orepukia florae Forster & Wilton, 1973
- Orepukia geophila Forster & Wilton, 1973
- Orepukia grisea Forster & Wilton, 1973
- Orepukia insula Forster & Wilton, 1973
- Orepukia nota Forster & Wilton, 1973
- Orepukia nummosa (Hogg, 1909)
- Orepukia orophila Forster & Wilton, 1973
- Orepukia pallida Forster & Wilton, 1973
- Orepukia poppelwelli Forster & Wilton, 1973
- Orepukia prina Forster & Wilton, 1973
- Orepukia rakiura Forster & Wilton, 1973
- Orepukia redacta Forster & Wilton, 1973
- Orepukia riparia Forster & Wilton, 1973
- Orepukia sabua Forster & Wilton, 1973
- Orepukia similis Forster & Wilton, 1973
- Orepukia simplex Forster & Wilton, 1973
- Orepukia sorenseni Forster & Wilton, 1973
- Orepukia tanea Forster & Wilton, 1973
- Orepukia tonga Forster & Wilton, 1973
- Orepukia virtuta Forster & Wilton, 1973
- Pacificana cockayni Hogg, 1904
- Pakeha buechlerae Forster & Wilton, 1973
- Pakeha duplex Forster & Wilton, 1973
- Pakeha hiloa Forster & Wilton, 1973
- Pakeha inornata Forster & Wilton, 1973
- Pakeha insignita Forster & Wilton, 1973
- Pakeha kirki (Hogg, 1909)
- Pakeha lobata Forster & Wilton, 1973
- Pakeha manapouri Forster & Wilton, 1973
- Pakeha maxima Forster & Wilton, 1973
- Pakeha media Forster & Wilton, 1973
- Pakeha minima Forster & Wilton, 1973
- Pakeha paratecta Forster & Wilton, 1973
- Pakeha parrotti Forster & Wilton, 1973
- Pakeha protecta Forster & Wilton, 1973
- Pakeha pula Forster & Wilton, 1973
- Pakeha stewartia Forster & Wilton, 1973
- Pakeha subtecta Forster & Wilton, 1973
- Pakeha tecta Forster & Wilton, 1973
- Plectophanes altus Forster, 1964
- Plectophanes archeyi Forster, 1964
- Plectophanes frontalis Bryant, 1935
- Plectophanes hollowayae Forster, 1964
- Plectophanes pilgrimi Forster, 1964
- Paravoca opaca Forster & Wilton, 1973
- Paravoca otagoensis Forster & Wilton, 1973
- Toxopsiella alpina Forster, 1964
- Toxopsiella australis Forster, 1964
- Toxopsiella centralis Forster, 1964
- Toxopsiella dugdalei Forster, 1964
- Toxopsiella horningi Forster, 1979
- Toxopsiella lawrencei Forster, 1964
- Toxopsiella medialis Forster, 1964
- Toxopsiella minuta Forster, 1964
- Toxopsiella nelsonensis Forster, 1979
- Toxopsiella orientalis Forster, 1964
- Toxopsiella parrotti Forster, 1964
- Toxopsiella perplexa Forster, 1964
- Uzakia unica (Forster, 1970)

=== Amaurobiidae ===
- Auhunga pectinata Forster & Wilton, 1973
- Maloides cavernicola (Forster & Wilton, 1989)
- Muritaia kaituna Forster & Wilton, 1973
- Muritaia longispinata Forster & Wilton, 1973
- Muritaia orientalis Forster & Wilton, 1973
- Muritaia parabusa Forster & Wilton, 1973
- Muritaia suba Forster & Wilton, 1973
- Otira canasta Forster & Wilton, 1973
- Otira indura Forster & Wilton, 1973
- Otira liana Forster & Wilton, 1973
- Otira parva Forster & Wilton, 1973
- Otira satura Forster & Wilton, 1973
- Otira terricola Forster & Wilton, 1973
- Waitetola huttoni Forster & Wilton, 1973

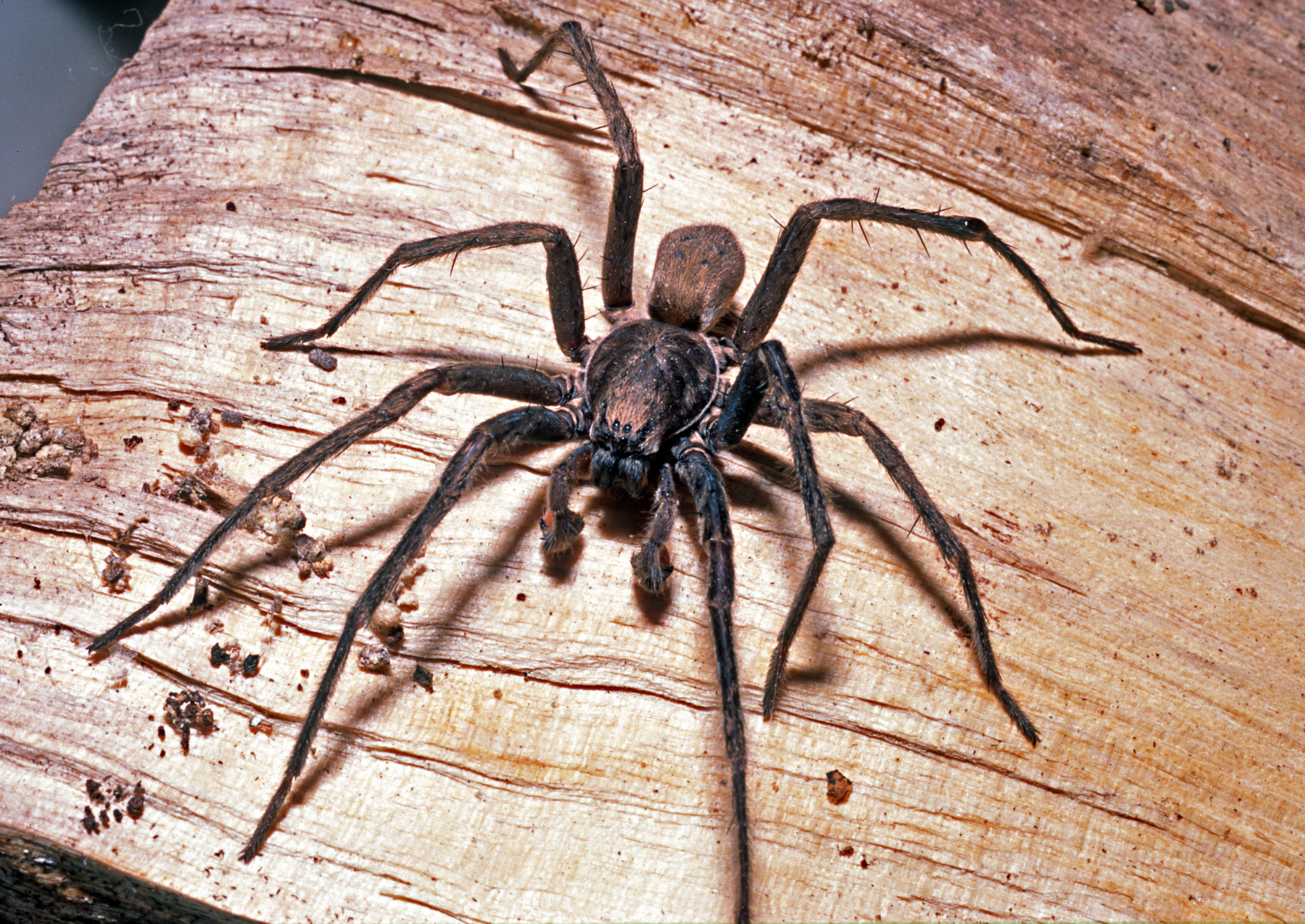
Uliodon sp

=== Zoropsidae ===
- Uliodon albopunctatus (L. Koch, 1873)
- Uliodon cervinus (L. Koch, 1873)
- Uliodon frenatus (L. Koch, 1873)
- Wiltona filicicola (Forster & Wilton, 1973)

=== Cheiracanthiidae ===
- Cheiracanthium stratioticum L. Koch, 1873

=== Miturgidae ===
- Zealoctenus cardronaensis Forster & Wilton, 1973

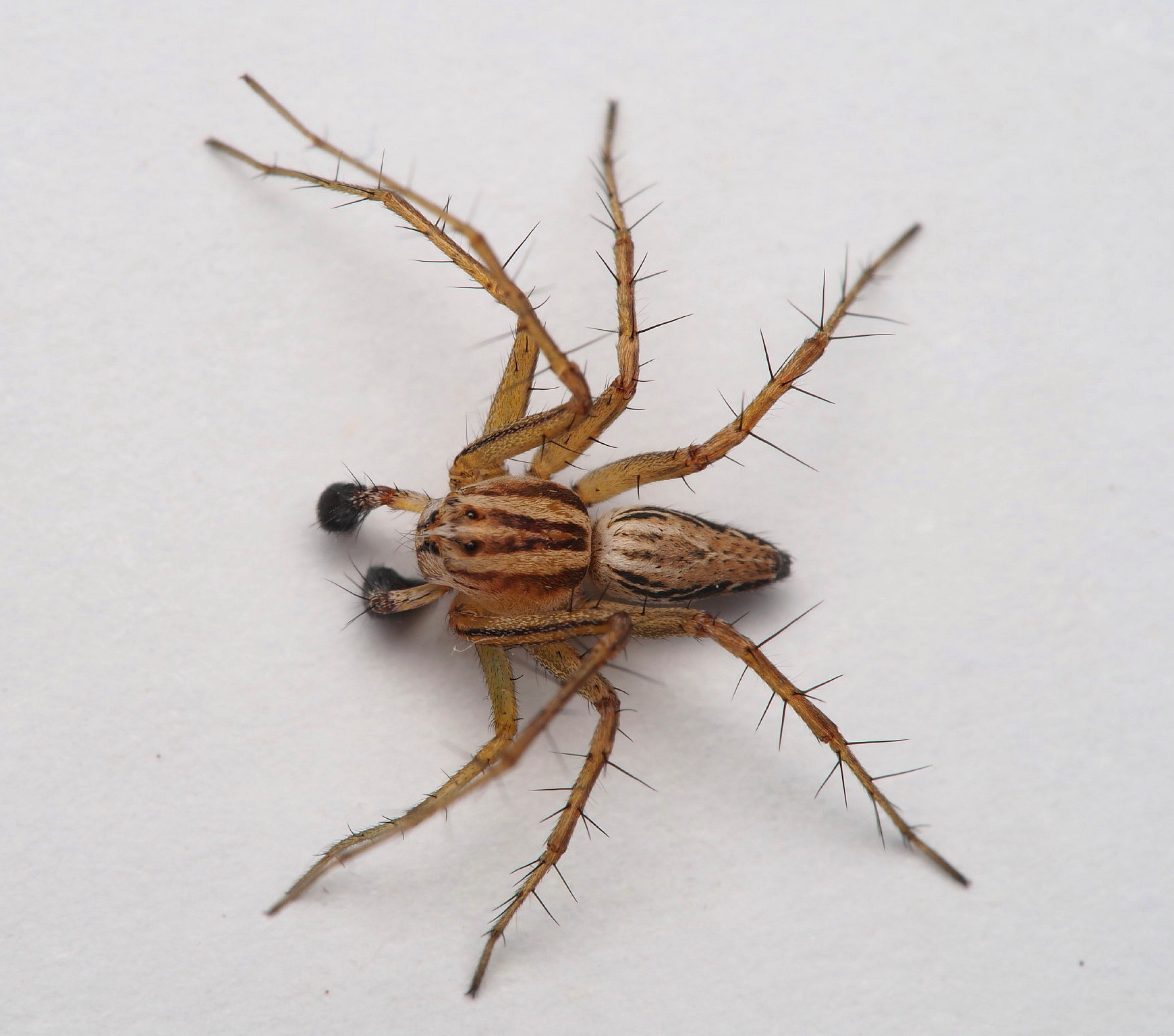
Oxyopes gracilipes

=== Oxyopidae ===
- Oxyopes gracilipes (White, 1849)

=== Pisauridae ===
- Dolomedes aquaticus Goyen, 1888
- Dolomedes dondalei Vink & Dupérré, 2010
- Dolomedes facetus L. Koch, 1876
- Dolomedes minor L. Koch, 1876
- Dolomedes schauinslandi Simon, 1899

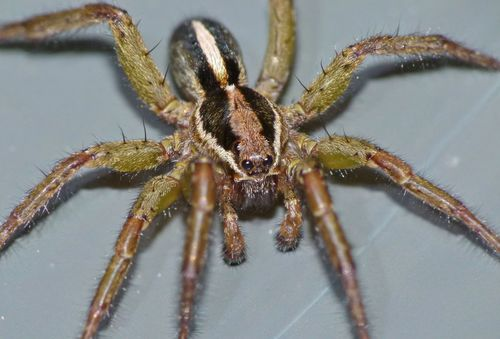
Anoteropsis hilaris

=== Lycosidae ===
- Anoteropsis adumbrata (Urquhart, 1887)
- Anoteropsis aerescens (Goyen, 1887)
- Anoteropsis alpina Vink, 2002
- Anoteropsis arenivaga (Dalmas, 1917)
- Anoteropsis blesti Vink, 2002
- Anoteropsis canescens (Goyen, 1887)
- Anoteropsis cantuaria Vink, 2002
- Anoteropsis flavescens L. Koch, 1878
- Anoteropsis forsteri Vink, 2002
- Anoteropsis hallae Vink, 2002
- Anoteropsis hilaris (L. Koch, 1877)
- Anoteropsis insularis Vink, 2002
- Anoteropsis lacustris Vink, 2002
- Anoteropsis litoralis Vink, 2002
- Anoteropsis montana Vink, 2002
- Anoteropsis okatainae Vink, 2002
- Anoteropsis ralphi (Simon, 1905)
- Anoteropsis senica (L. Koch, 1877)
- Anoteropsis urquharti (Simon, 1898)
- Anoteropsis westlandica Vink, 2002
- Artoria hospita Vink 2002
- Artoria segrega Vink 2002
- Artoria separata Vink 2002
- Notocosa bellicosa (Goyen 1888)
- Hogna crispipes L. Koch 1877
- Venatrix konei (Berland 1924)
- Allotrochosina schauinslandi (Simon 1899)
