= List of Physoglenidae species =

This page lists all described species of the spider family Physoglenidae accepted by the World Spider Catalog as of January 2021:

== C ==
=== Calcarsynotaxus ===
Calcarsynotaxus Wunderlich, 1995

- C. benrobertsi Rix, Roberts & Harvey, 2009 — Australia (Western Australia)
- C. longipes Wunderlich, 1995 (type) — Australia (Queensland)

=== Chileotaxus ===
Chileotaxus Platnick, 1990

- C. sans Platnick, 1990 (type) — Chile

== M ==
=== Mangua ===
Mangua Forster, 1990

- M. caswell Forster, 1990 — New Zealand
- M. convoluta Forster, 1990 — New Zealand
- M. flora Forster, 1990 — New Zealand
- M. forsteri (Brignoli, 1983) — New Zealand (Auckland Is., Campbell Is.)
- M. gunni Forster, 1990 (type) — New Zealand
- M. hughsoni Forster, 1990 — New Zealand
- M. kapiti Forster, 1990 — New Zealand
- M. makarora Forster, 1990 — New Zealand
- M. medialis Forster, 1990 — New Zealand
- M. oparara Forster, 1990 — New Zealand
- M. otira Forster, 1990 — New Zealand
- M. paringa Forster, 1990 — New Zealand
- M. sana Forster, 1990 — New Zealand
- M. secunda Forster, 1990 — New Zealand

=== Meringa ===
Meringa

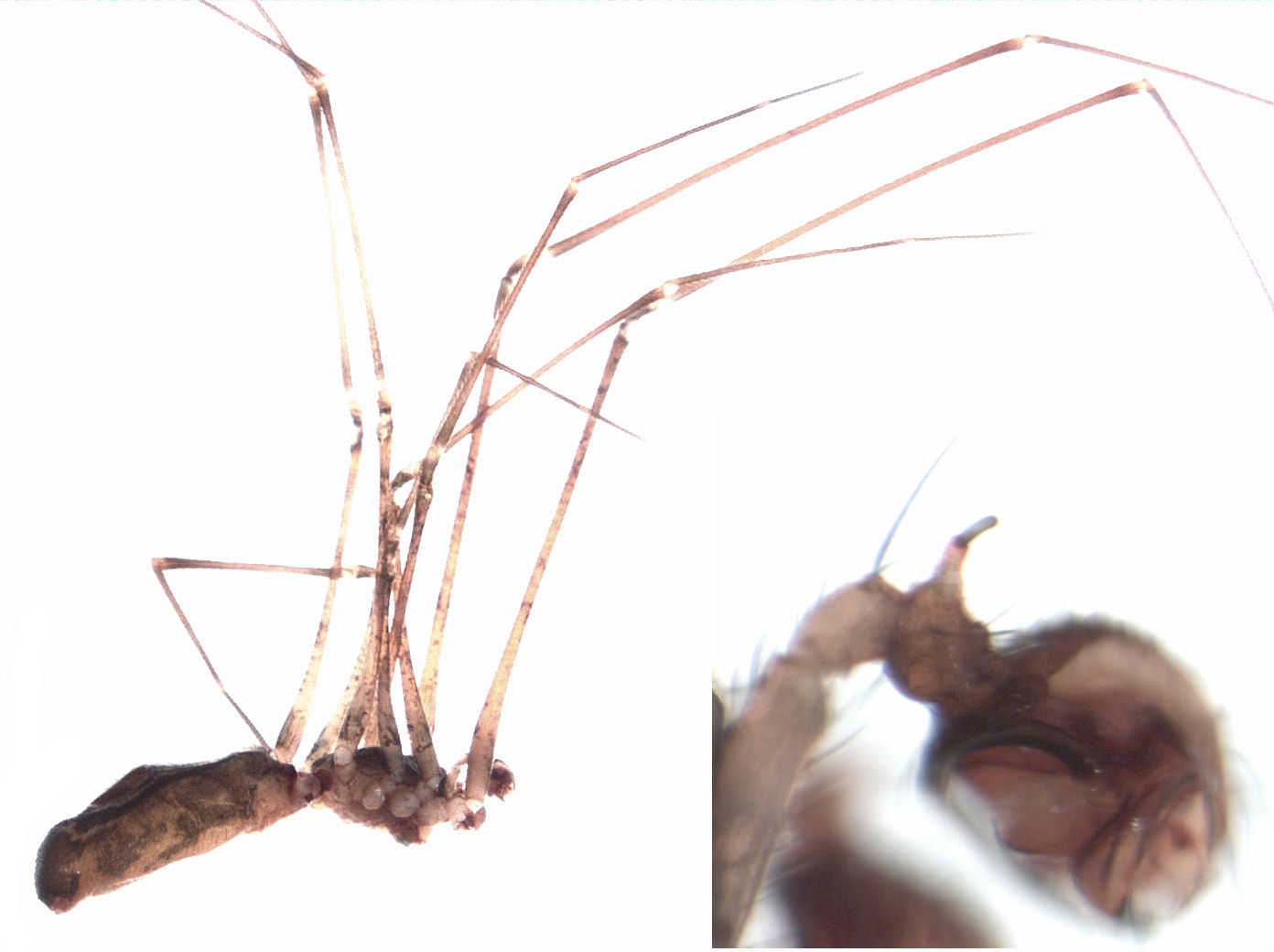
Meringa sp, male

Meringa Forster, 1990

- M. australis Forster, 1990 — New Zealand
- M. borealis Forster, 1990 — New Zealand
- M. centralis Forster, 1990 — New Zealand
- M. conway Forster, 1990 — New Zealand
- M. hinaka Forster, 1990 — New Zealand
- M. leith Forster, 1990 — New Zealand
- M. nelson Forster, 1990 — New Zealand
- M. otago Forster, 1990 (type) — New Zealand
- M. tetragyna Forster, 1990 — New Zealand

=== Microsynotaxus ===
Microsynotaxus Wunderlich, 2008

- M. calliope Wunderlich, 2008 — Australia (Queensland)
- M. insolens Wunderlich, 2008 (type) — Australia (Queensland)

== N ==
=== Nomaua ===
Nomaua Forster, 1990

- N. arborea Forster, 1990 — New Zealand
- N. cauda Forster, 1990 — New Zealand
- N. crinifrons (Urquhart, 1891) (type) — New Zealand
- N. nelson Forster, 1990 — New Zealand
- N. perdita Forster, 1990 — New Zealand
- N. rakiura Fitzgerald & Sirvid, 2009 — New Zealand (Stewart Is.)
- N. repanga Fitzgerald & Sirvid, 2009 — New Zealand
- N. rimutaka Fitzgerald & Sirvid, 2009 — New Zealand
- N. taranga Fitzgerald & Sirvid, 2009 — New Zealand
- N. urquharti Fitzgerald & Sirvid, 2009 — New Zealand
- N. waikanae (Forster, 1990) — New Zealand
- N. waikaremoana Forster, 1990 — New Zealand

== P ==
=== Pahora ===
Pahora Forster, 1990

- P. cantuaria Forster, 1990 — New Zealand
- P. graminicola Forster, 1990 — New Zealand
- P. kaituna Forster, 1990 — New Zealand
- P. media Forster, 1990 — New Zealand
- P. montana Forster, 1990 — New Zealand
- P. murihiku Forster, 1990 (type) — New Zealand
- P. rakiura Forster, 1990 — New Zealand
- P. taranaki Forster, 1990 — New Zealand
- P. wiltoni Forster, 1990 — New Zealand

=== Pahoroides ===
Pahoroides

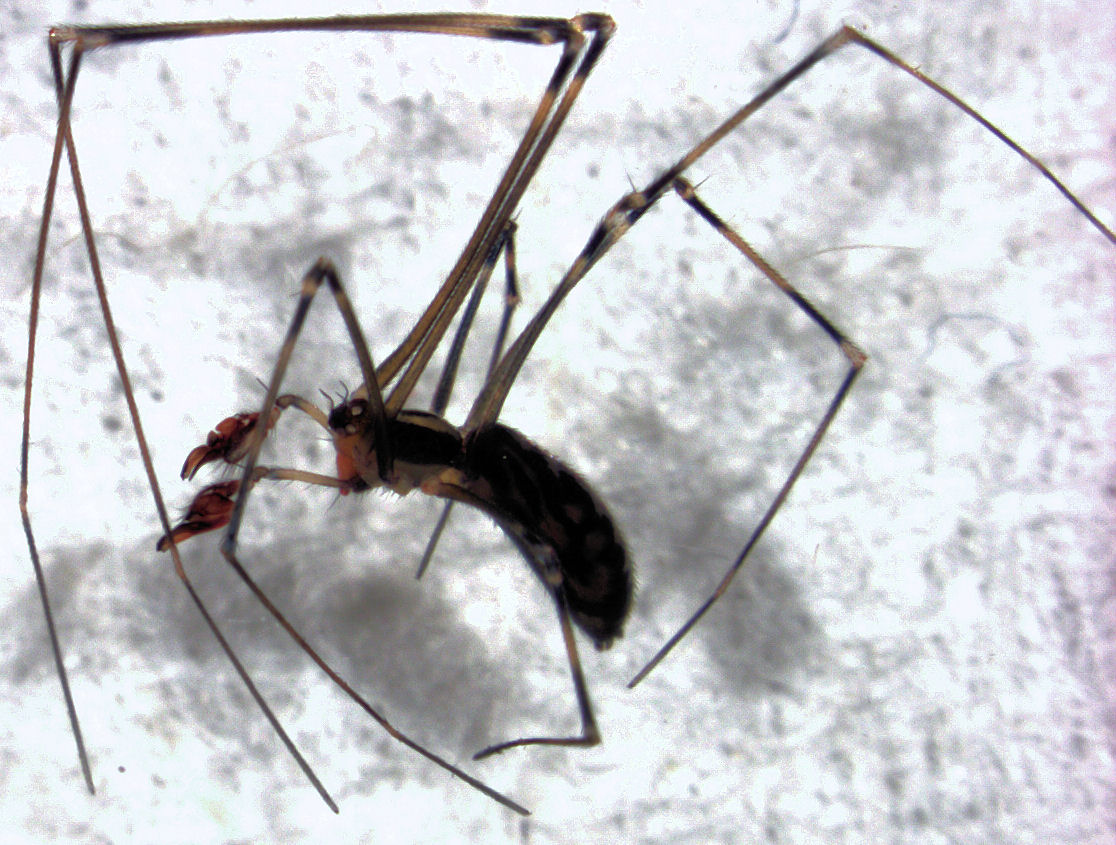
Pahoroides aucklandica, male

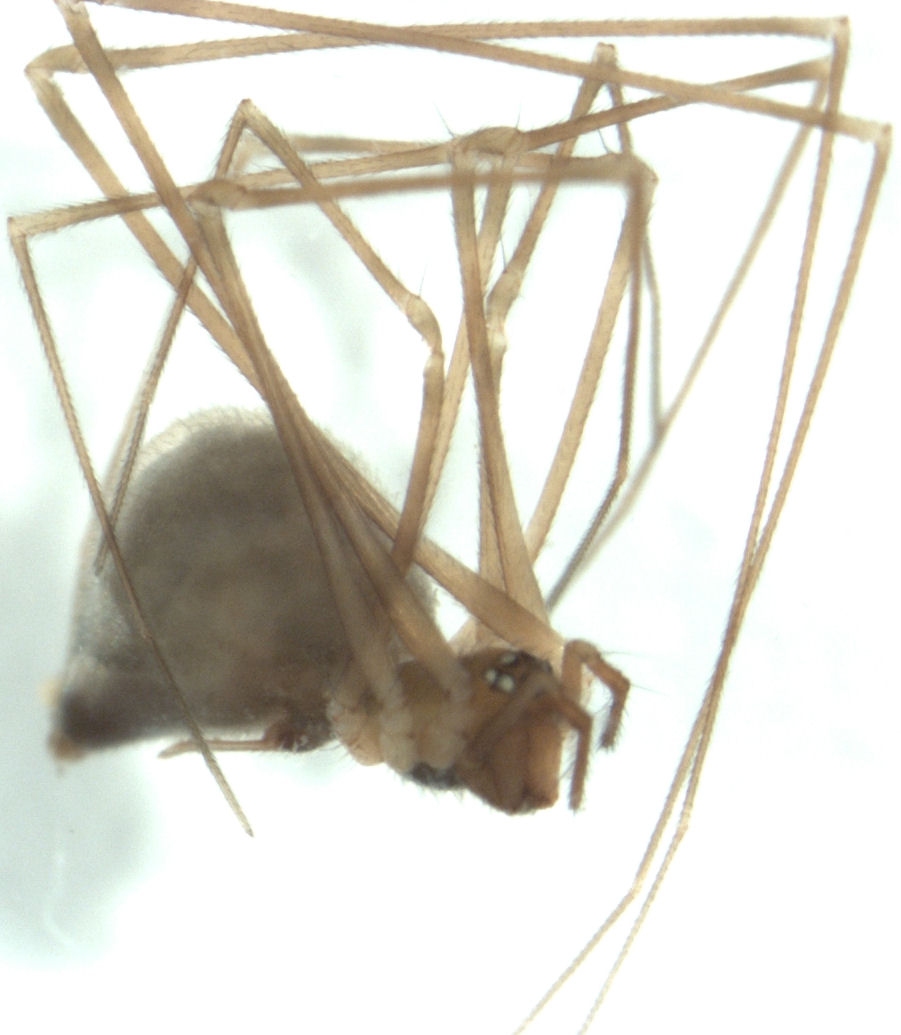
Pahoroides courti

Pahoroides Forster, 1990

- P. aucklandica Fitzgerald & Sirvid, 2011 — New Zealand
- P. balli Fitzgerald & Sirvid, 2011 — New Zealand
- P. confusa Fitzgerald & Sirvid, 2011 — New Zealand
- P. courti Forster, 1990 — New Zealand
- P. forsteri Fitzgerald & Sirvid, 2011 — New Zealand
- P. gallina Fitzgerald & Sirvid, 2011 — New Zealand
- P. kohukohu Fitzgerald & Sirvid, 2011 — New Zealand
- P. whangarei Forster, 1990 (type) — New Zealand

=== Paratupua ===
Paratupua Platnick, 1990

- P. grayi Platnick, 1990 (type) — Australia (Victoria)

=== Physoglenes ===
Physoglenes Simon, 1904

- P. chepu Platnick, 1990 — Chile
- P. lagos Platnick, 1990 — Chile
- P. puyehue Platnick, 1990 — Chile
- P. vivesi Simon, 1904 (type) — Chile

== R ==
=== Runga ===
Runga Forster, 1990

- R. akaroa Forster, 1990 — New Zealand
- R. flora Forster, 1990 — New Zealand
- R. moana Forster, 1990 — New Zealand
- R. nina Forster, 1990 (type) — New Zealand
- R. raroa Forster, 1990 — New Zealand

== T ==
=== Tupua ===
Tupua Platnick, 1990

- T. bisetosa Platnick, 1990 (type) — Australia (Tasmania)
- T. cavernicola Platnick, 1990 — Australia (Tasmania)
- T. raveni Platnick, 1990 — Australia (Tasmania)
- T. troglodytes Platnick, 1990 — Australia (Tasmania)

== Z ==
=== Zeatupua ===
Zeatupua Fitzgerald & Sirvid, 2009

- Z. forsteri Fitzgerald & Sirvid, 2009 (type) — New Zealand
