= Tupua =

Tupua may refer to:

- The five principal gods of Niuean mythology, Fao, Fakahoko, Huanaki, Lage-iki, Lagi-atea
- Tipua, a spirit in Maori mythology
- Tupua Tamasese, the title of a paramount chief of Samoa
  - Tufuga Efi, also known as Tupua Tamasese Tupuola Tufuga Efi, former Prime Minister of Samoa
- Tupua (spider), a spider genus
