= Pahora murihiku =

Conservation status
- Not Threatened (NZ TCS)

Scientific classification
- Kingdom: Animalia
- Phylum: Arthropoda
- Subphylum: Chelicerata
- Class: Arachnida
- Order: Araneae
- Infraorder: Araneomorphae
- Family: Physoglenidae
- Genus: Pahora
- Species: P. murihiku

Binomial name
- Pahora murihiku Forster, 1990

Species of spider

Pahora murihiku is a species of Physoglenidae spider endemic to New Zealand.

== Taxonomy ==
This species was described in 1990 by Ray Forster from male and female specimens. It is the type species of the Pahora genus. The holotype is stored in Otago Museum.

== Description ==
The male is recorded at 2.78mm in length whereas the female is 2.29mm. This species has a yellow brown carapace with a dark medial band. The abdomen is black with white markings.

== Distribution ==
This species is only known from Otago and Southland in New Zealand. It seems to be restricted to shaded forest.

== Conservation status ==
Under the New Zealand Threat Classification System, this species is listed as "Not Threatened".
