= Pahora graminicola =

Conservation status
- Not Threatened (NZ TCS)

Scientific classification
- Kingdom: Animalia
- Phylum: Arthropoda
- Subphylum: Chelicerata
- Class: Arachnida
- Order: Araneae
- Infraorder: Araneomorphae
- Family: Physoglenidae
- Genus: Pahora
- Species: P. graminicola

Binomial name
- Pahora graminicola Forster, 1990

Species of spider

Pahora graminicola is a species of Physoglenidae spider endemic to New Zealand.

== Taxonomy ==
This species was described in 1990 by Ray Forster from male and female specimens. The holotype is stored in Otago Museum.

== Description ==
The male is recorded at 2.41mm in length whereas the female is 1.95mm. The carapace is shaded with black. The abdomen has a chevron pattern dorsally.

== Distribution ==
This species is known from the southern part of the South Island in New Zealand. They appear to be restricted to swamps and tussock.

== Conservation status ==
Under the New Zealand Threat Classification System, this species is listed as "Not Threatened".
