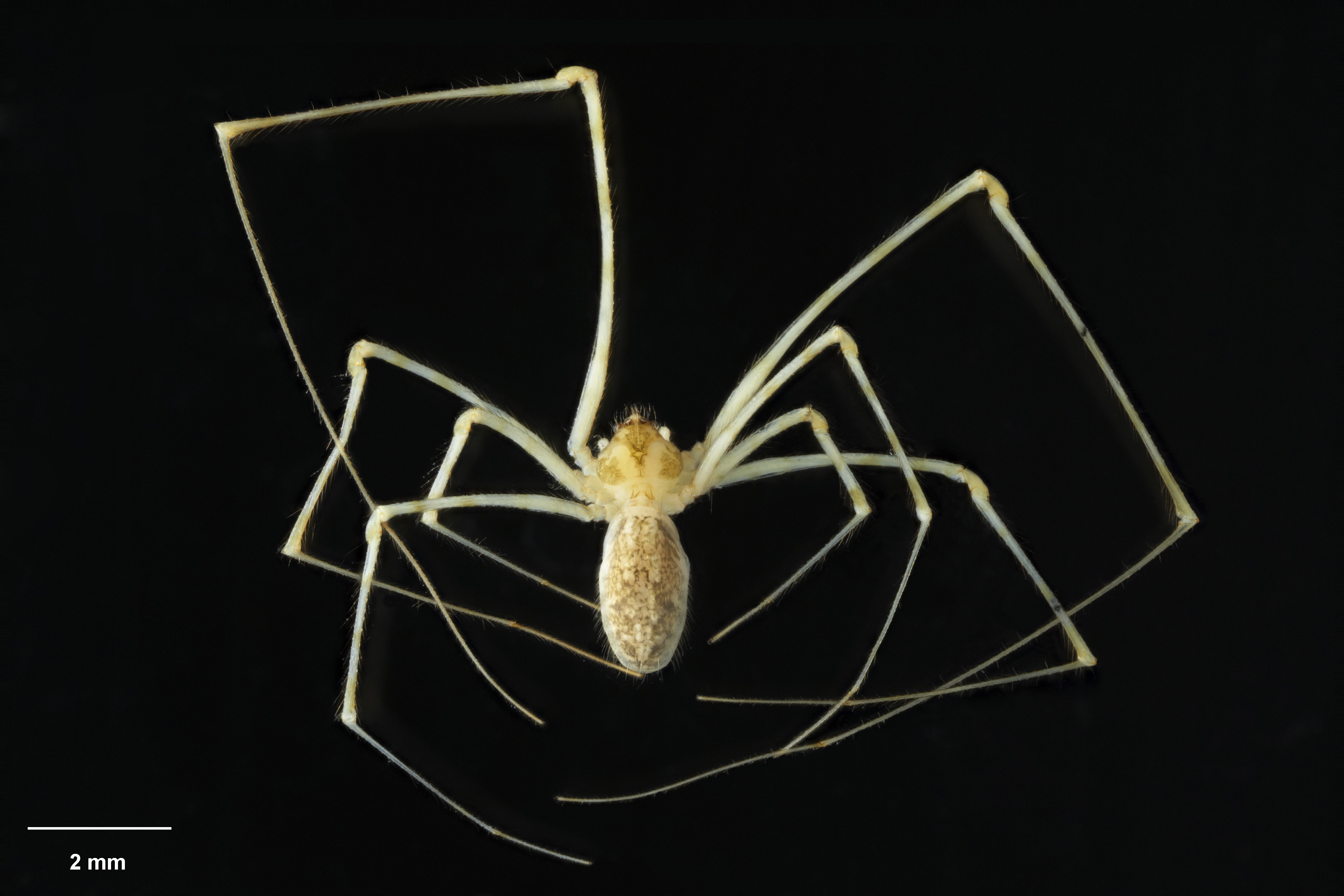

Conservation status
- Not Threatened (NZ TCS)

Scientific classification
- Domain: Eukaryota
- Kingdom: Animalia
- Phylum: Arthropoda
- Subphylum: Chelicerata
- Class: Arachnida
- Order: Araneae
- Infraorder: Araneomorphae
- Family: Physoglenidae
- Genus: Nomaua
- Species: N. rimutaka

Binomial name
- Nomaua rimutaka Fitzgerald & Sirvid, 2009

Synonyms
- Wairua waikanae

= Nomaua rimutaka =

Species of spider

Nomaua rimutaka is a species of Physoglenidae spider endemic to New Zealand.

== Taxonomy ==
This species was described in 2009 by Mike Fitzgerald and Phil Sirvid from male and female specimens. The holotype is stored in Te Papa Museum under registration number AS.002419.

== Description ==
The male is recorded at 4.09mm in length whereas the female is 3.62mm.

== Distribution ==
This species is only known from the Wellington region of New Zealand.

== Conservation status ==
Under the New Zealand Threat Classification System, this species is listed as "Not Threatened".
