= Nomaua crinifrons =

Conservation status
- Naturally Uncommon (NZ TCS)

Scientific classification
- Domain: Eukaryota
- Kingdom: Animalia
- Phylum: Arthropoda
- Subphylum: Chelicerata
- Class: Arachnida
- Order: Araneae
- Infraorder: Araneomorphae
- Family: Physoglenidae
- Genus: Nomaua
- Species: N. crinifrons

Binomial name
- Nomaua crinifrons (Urquhart, 1891)

Synonyms
- Cornicularia crinifrons Bolyphantes crinifrons

Species of spider

Nomaua crinifrons is a species of Physoglenidae spider endemic to New Zealand.

== Taxonomy ==
This species was described as Cornicularia crinifrons in 1891 by Arthur Urquhart. It was most recently revised in 2009.

== Description ==
The male is recorded at 3.31mm in length whereas the female is 2.99mm.

== Distribution ==
This species is only known from the Taranaki region in New Zealand.

== Conservation status ==
Under the New Zealand Threat Classification System, this species is listed as "Naturally Uncommon" with the qualifier of "Range Restricted".
