= Runga nina =

Conservation status
- Not Threatened (NZ TCS)

Scientific classification
- Kingdom: Animalia
- Phylum: Arthropoda
- Subphylum: Chelicerata
- Class: Arachnida
- Order: Araneae
- Infraorder: Araneomorphae
- Family: Physoglenidae
- Genus: Runga
- Species: R. nina

Binomial name
- Runga nina Forster, 1990

Species of spider

Runga nina is a species of Physoglenidae spider endemic to New Zealand.

== Taxonomy ==
This species was described in 1990 by Ray Forster from male and female specimens. It is the type species of the Runga genus. The holotype is stored in Otago Museum.

== Description ==
The male is recorded at 4.10mm in length whereas the female is 4.21mm.

== Distribution ==
This species is only known from southern Westland and north Fiordland in New Zealand.

== Conservation status ==
Under the New Zealand Threat Classification System, this species is listed as "Not Threatened".
