= Nomaua cauda =

Conservation status
- Not Threatened (NZ TCS)

Scientific classification
- Kingdom: Animalia
- Phylum: Arthropoda
- Subphylum: Chelicerata
- Class: Arachnida
- Order: Araneae
- Infraorder: Araneomorphae
- Family: Physoglenidae
- Genus: Nomaua
- Species: N. cauda

Binomial name
- Nomaua cauda Forster, 1990

Species of spider

Nomaua cauda is a species of Physoglenidae spider endemic to New Zealand.

== Taxonomy ==
This species was described in 1990 by Ray Forster from male and female specimens. It was most recently revised in 2009. The holotype is stored in Otago Museum.

== Description ==
The male is recorded at 4.94mm in length whereas the female is 3.29mm.

== Distribution ==
This species is distributed in the lower half of the North Island of New Zealand.

== Conservation status ==
Under the New Zealand Threat Classification System, this species is listed as "Not Threatened".
