= Nomaua perdita =

Conservation status
- Not Threatened (NZ TCS)

Scientific classification
- Kingdom: Animalia
- Phylum: Arthropoda
- Subphylum: Chelicerata
- Class: Arachnida
- Order: Araneae
- Infraorder: Araneomorphae
- Family: Physoglenidae
- Genus: Nomaua
- Species: N. perdita

Binomial name
- Nomaua perdita Forster, 1990

Synonyms
- Wairua reinga Nomaua crinifrons

Species of spider

Nomaua perdita is a species of Physoglenidae spider endemic to New Zealand.

== Taxonomy ==
This species was described in 1990 as Wairua reinga by Ray Forster from female specimens. It was most recently revised in 2009, in which the male was described. The holotype is stored in Otago Museum.

== Description ==
The male is recorded at 3.31mm in length, whereas the female is 3.15mm.

== Distribution ==
This species is only known from the North Island of New Zealand.

== Conservation status ==
Under the New Zealand Threat Classification System, this species is listed as "Not Threatened".
