= Pahoroides whangarei =

Conservation status
- Not Threatened (NZ TCS)

Scientific classification
- Kingdom: Animalia
- Phylum: Arthropoda
- Subphylum: Chelicerata
- Class: Arachnida
- Order: Araneae
- Infraorder: Araneomorphae
- Family: Physoglenidae
- Genus: Pahoroides
- Species: P. whangarei

Binomial name
- Pahoroides whangarei Forster, 1990

Species of spider

Pahoroides whangarei is a species of Physoglenidae spider endemic to New Zealand.

== Taxonomy ==
This species was described in 1990 by Ray Forster from male and female specimens. It was most recently revised in 2011. The holotype is stored in Otago Museum under registration number OMNZ IV2962.

== Description ==
The male is recorded at 2.76mm in length whereas the female is 2.05mm.

== Distribution ==
This species is only known from Northland, New Zealand.

== Conservation status ==
Under the New Zealand Threat Classification System, this species is listed as "Not Threatened".
