= Pahora rakiura =

Conservation status
- Not Threatened (NZ TCS)

Scientific classification
- Kingdom: Animalia
- Phylum: Arthropoda
- Subphylum: Chelicerata
- Class: Arachnida
- Order: Araneae
- Infraorder: Araneomorphae
- Family: Physoglenidae
- Genus: Pahora
- Species: P. rakiura

Binomial name
- Pahora rakiura Forster, 1990

Species of spider

Pahora rakiura is a species of Physoglenidae spider endemic to New Zealand.

== Taxonomy ==
This species was described in 1990 by Ray Forster from female specimens. The holotype is stored in Otago Museum.

== Description ==
The female is recorded at 2.17mm in length. This species has a brown carapace. The abdomen is brown with mottled white patches.

== Distribution ==
This species is only known from Stewart Island and Southland in New Zealand.

== Conservation status ==
Under the New Zealand Threat Classification System, this species is listed as "Not Threatened".
