= Pahora cantuaria =

Conservation status
- Data Deficit (NZ TCS)

Scientific classification
- Kingdom: Animalia
- Phylum: Arthropoda
- Subphylum: Chelicerata
- Class: Arachnida
- Order: Araneae
- Infraorder: Araneomorphae
- Family: Physoglenidae
- Genus: Pahora
- Species: P. cantuaria

Binomial name
- Pahora cantuaria Forster, 1990

Species of spider

Pahora cantuaria is a species of Physoglenidae spider endemic to New Zealand.

== Taxonomy ==
This species was described in 1990 by Ray Forster from male specimens. The holotype is stored in Otago Museum.

== Description ==
The male is recorded at 2.82mm in length. The carapace has dark markings medially and laterally. The abdomen has white markings.

== Distribution ==
This species is only known from Canterbury, New Zealand.

== Conservation status ==
Under the New Zealand Threat Classification System, this species is listed as "Data Deficient" with the qualifiers of "Data Poor: Size" and "Data Poor: Trend".
