= Meringa australis =

Conservation status
- Naturally Uncommon (NZ TCS)

Scientific classification
- Kingdom: Animalia
- Phylum: Arthropoda
- Subphylum: Chelicerata
- Class: Arachnida
- Order: Araneae
- Infraorder: Araneomorphae
- Family: Physoglenidae
- Genus: Meringa
- Species: M. australis

Binomial name
- Meringa australis Forster, 1990

Species of spider

Meringa australis is a species of Physoglenidae spider endemic to New Zealand.

== Taxonomy ==
This species was described in 1990 by Ray Forster from male and female specimens. The holotype is stored in Te Papa Museum.

== Description ==
The male is recorded at 4.02mm in length whereas the female is 2.56mm. The carapace is pale brown. The abdomen has pale markings dorsally.

== Distribution ==
This species is only known from Big South Cape Island, New Zealand.

== Conservation status ==
Under the New Zealand Threat Classification System, this species is listed as "Naturally Uncommon" with the qualifier of "Island Endemic" and "One Location".
