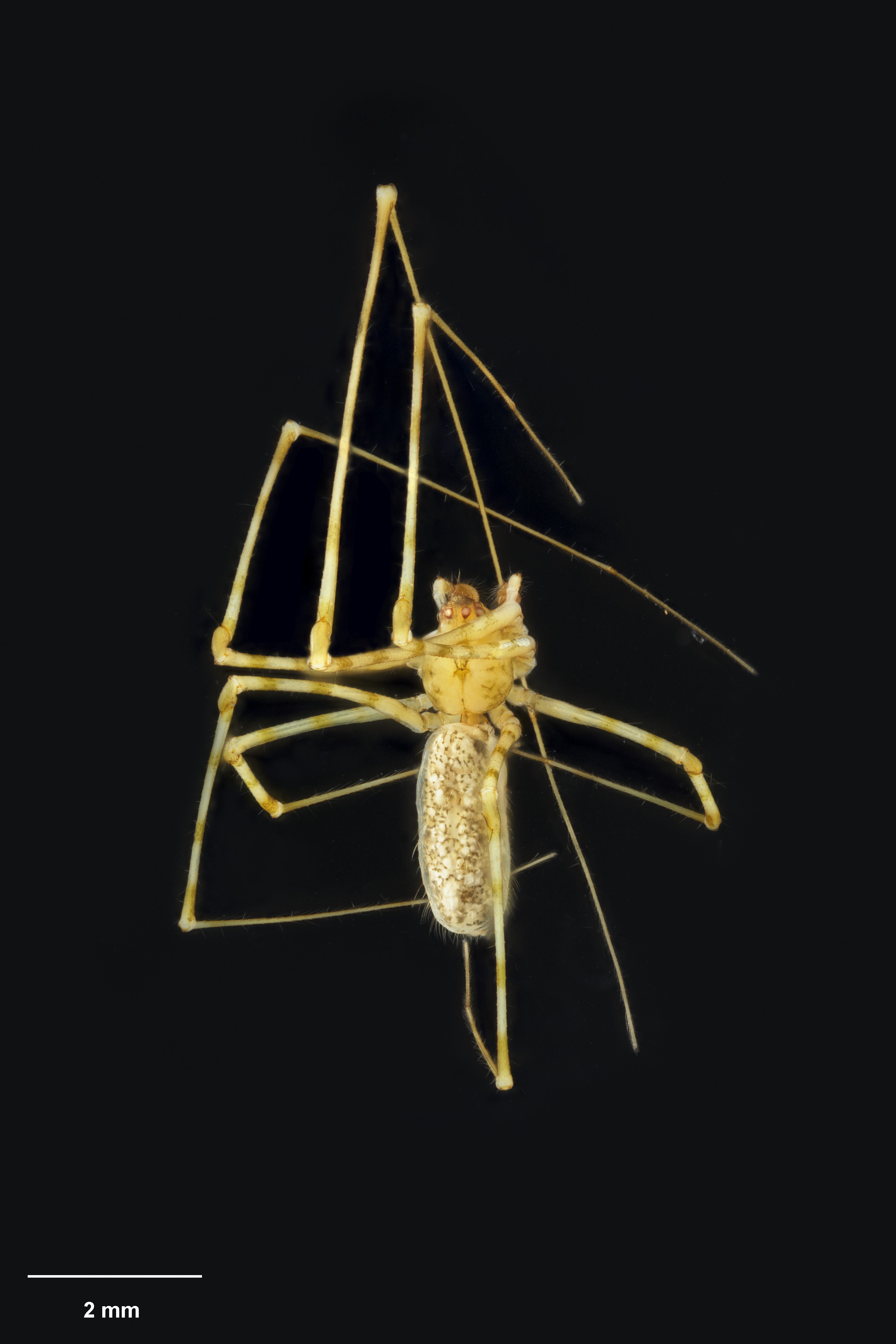

Conservation status
- Data Deficient (NZ TCS)

Scientific classification
- Domain: Eukaryota
- Kingdom: Animalia
- Phylum: Arthropoda
- Subphylum: Chelicerata
- Class: Arachnida
- Order: Araneae
- Infraorder: Araneomorphae
- Family: Physoglenidae
- Genus: Nomaua
- Species: N. taranga

Binomial name
- Nomaua taranga Fitzgerald & Sirvid, 2009

= Nomaua taranga =

Species of spider

Nomaua taranga is a species of Physoglenidae spider endemic to New Zealand.

== Taxonomy ==
This species was described in 2009 by Mike Fitzgerald and Phil Sirvid from male and female specimens. The holotype is stored in Te Papa Museum under registration number AS.001500.

== Description ==
The male is recorded at 3.39mm in length whereas the female is 3.31mm.

== Distribution ==
This species is only known from Hen Island in New Zealand.

== Conservation status ==
Under the New Zealand Threat Classification System, this species is listed as "Data Deficient" with the qualifiers of "Data Poor: Size", "Data Poor: Trend", "Island Endemic" and "One Location".
