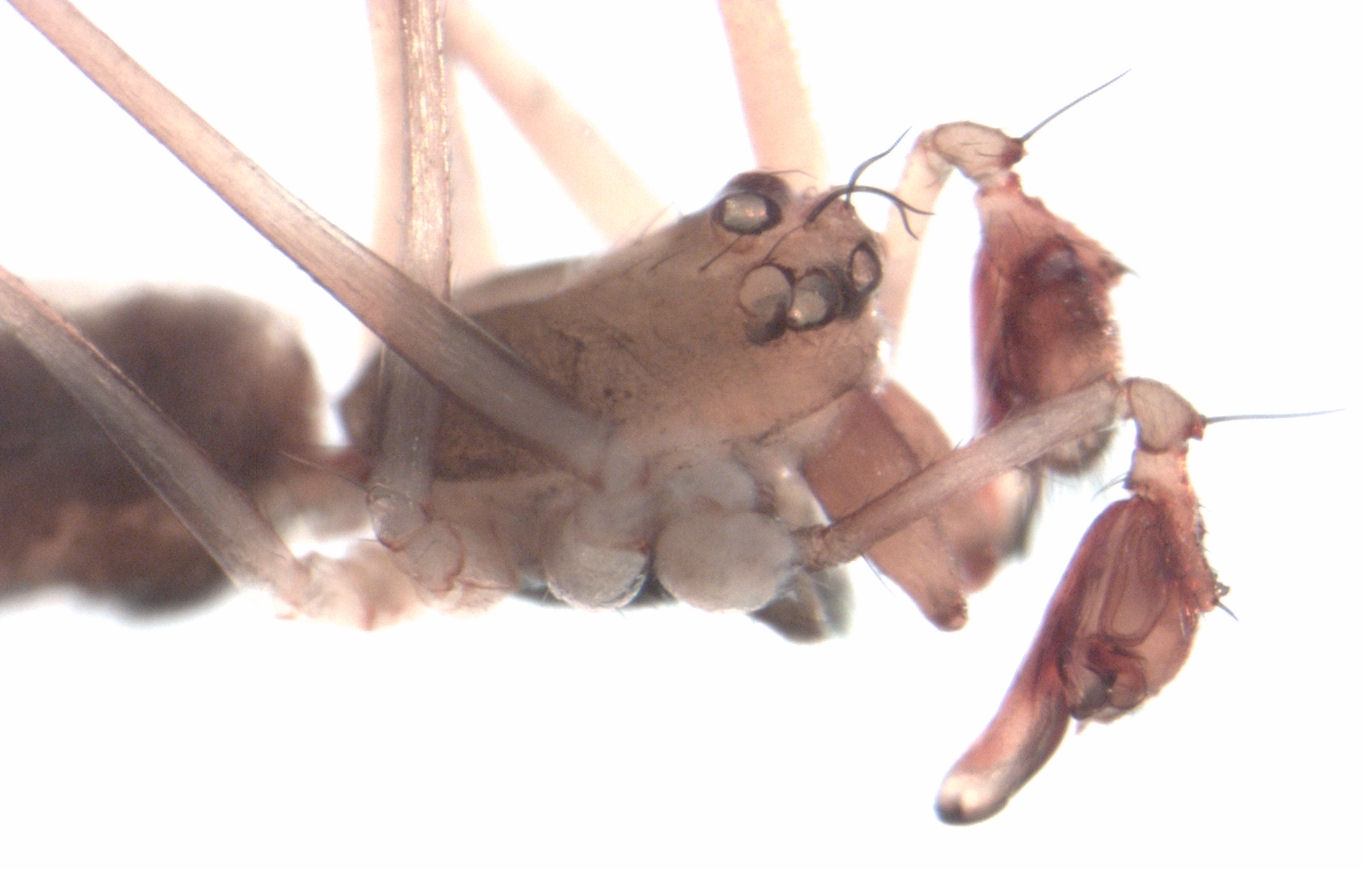

Conservation status
- Not Threatened (NZ TCS)

Scientific classification
- Kingdom: Animalia
- Phylum: Arthropoda
- Subphylum: Chelicerata
- Class: Arachnida
- Order: Araneae
- Infraorder: Araneomorphae
- Family: Physoglenidae
- Genus: Pahoroides
- Species: P. courti

Binomial name
- Pahoroides courti Forster, 1990

= Pahoroides courti =

Species of spider

Pahoroides courti is a species of Physoglenidae spider endemic to New Zealand.

== Taxonomy ==
This species was described in 1990 by Ray Forster from male and female specimens. It was most recently revised in 2011. The holotype is stored in Otago Museum under registration number OMNZ IV2964.

== Description ==
The male is recorded at 2.52mm in length whereas the female is 2.13mm.

== Distribution ==
This species is only known from the northern half of the North Island in New Zealand.

== Conservation status ==
Under the New Zealand Threat Classification System, this species is listed as "Not Threatened".
