= Mangua forsteri =

Conservation status
- Not Threatened (NZ TCS)

Scientific classification
- Domain: Eukaryota
- Kingdom: Animalia
- Phylum: Arthropoda
- Subphylum: Chelicerata
- Class: Arachnida
- Order: Araneae
- Infraorder: Araneomorphae
- Family: Physoglenidae
- Genus: Mangua
- Species: M. forsteri

Binomial name
- Mangua forsteri (Brignoli, 1983)

Synonyms
- Linyphia setosa; Linyphia forsteri

Species of spider

Mangua forsteri is a species of Physoglenidae spider endemic to New Zealand.

== Taxonomy ==
This species was described as Linyphia setosa in 1964 by Ray Forster from male and female specimens. The species name was changed to Linyphia forsteri in 1983. It was most recently revised in 1990, in which it was moved to the Mangua genus. The holotype is stored in Te Papa Museum under registration number AS.000108.

== Description ==
The male is recorded at 2.14mm in length whereas the female is 1.66mm. The male has a dark brown cephalothorax and dark brown legs. The abdomen is black brown and has a pale pattern dorsally.

== Distribution ==
This species is known from the subantarctic Campbell Island and Auckland Islands in New Zealand.

== Conservation status ==
Under the New Zealand Threat Classification System, this species is listed as "Not Threatened".
