= Nomaua waikaremoana =

Conservation status
- Data Deficit (NZ TCS)

Scientific classification
- Kingdom: Animalia
- Phylum: Arthropoda
- Subphylum: Chelicerata
- Class: Arachnida
- Order: Araneae
- Infraorder: Araneomorphae
- Family: Physoglenidae
- Genus: Nomaua
- Species: N. waikaremoana

Binomial name
- Nomaua waikaremoana Forster, 1990

Species of spider

Nomaua waikaremoana is a species of Physoglenidae spider endemic to New Zealand.

== Taxonomy ==
This species was described in 1990 by Ray Forster from female specimens. It was most recently revised in 2009. The holotype is stored in Te Papa Museum.

== Description ==
The female is recorded at 3.62mm in length. This species has a pale brown carapace that is shaded around the eyes. The abdomen is shaded and has a pale medial band.

== Distribution ==
This species is only known from Hawkes Bay, New Zealand.

== Conservation status ==
Under the New Zealand Threat Classification System, this species is listed as "Data Deficient" with the qualifiers of "Data Poor: Size", "Data Poor: Trend" and "One Location".
