= Runga akaroa =

Conservation status
- Not Threatened (NZ TCS)

Scientific classification
- Kingdom: Animalia
- Phylum: Arthropoda
- Subphylum: Chelicerata
- Class: Arachnida
- Order: Araneae
- Infraorder: Araneomorphae
- Family: Physoglenidae
- Genus: Runga
- Species: R. akaroa

Binomial name
- Runga akaroa Forster, 1990

Species of spider

Runga akaroa is a species of Physoglenidae spider endemic to New Zealand.

== Taxonomy ==
This species was described in 1990 by Ray Forster from male and female specimens. The holotype is stored in Canterbury Museum.

== Description ==
The male is recorded at 3.32mm in length whereas the female is 3.20mm. The male has a yellow brown carapace. The abdomen has white and black markings. The female abdomen is darkly shaded and has a pale band dorsally.

== Distribution ==
This species is only known from Canterbury, New Zealand.

== Conservation status ==
Under the New Zealand Threat Classification System, this species is listed as "Not Threatened".
