= Pahora taranaki =

Conservation status
- Data Deficit (NZ TCS)

Scientific classification
- Kingdom: Animalia
- Phylum: Arthropoda
- Subphylum: Chelicerata
- Class: Arachnida
- Order: Araneae
- Infraorder: Araneomorphae
- Family: Physoglenidae
- Genus: Pahora
- Species: P. taranaki

Binomial name
- Pahora taranaki Forster, 1990

Species of spider

Pahora taranaki is a species of Physoglenidae spider endemic to New Zealand.

== Taxonomy ==
This species was described in 1990 by Ray Forster from male and female specimens. The holotype is stored in Otago Museum.

== Description ==
The male is recorded at 2.23mm in length whereas the female is 1.65mm. The male has a straw brown carapace. The abdomen is pale with black markings. The female has a pale yellow with a dark band dorsally.

== Distribution ==
This species is only known from Taranaki, New Zealand.

== Conservation status ==
Under the New Zealand Threat Classification System, this species is listed as "Data Deficient" with the qualifiers of "Data Poor: Size" and "Data Poor: Trend".
