= Nomaua arborea =

Conservation status
- Data Deficit (NZ TCS)

Scientific classification
- Kingdom: Animalia
- Phylum: Arthropoda
- Subphylum: Chelicerata
- Class: Arachnida
- Order: Araneae
- Infraorder: Araneomorphae
- Family: Physoglenidae
- Genus: Nomaua
- Species: N. arborea

Binomial name
- Nomaua arborea Forster, 1990

Species of spider

Nomaua arborea is a species of Physoglenidae spider endemic to New Zealand.

== Taxonomy ==
This species was described in 1988 by Ray Forster from male specimens. The holotype is stored in Otago Museum.

== Description ==
The male is recorded at 3.32mm in length. This species has a yellow brown carapace. The abdomen is patterned dorsally.

== Distribution ==
This species is only known from Fiordland, New Zealand.

== Conservation status ==
Under the New Zealand Threat Classification System, this species is listed as "Data Deficient" with the qualifiers of "Data Poor: Size", "Data Poor: Trend" and "One Location".
