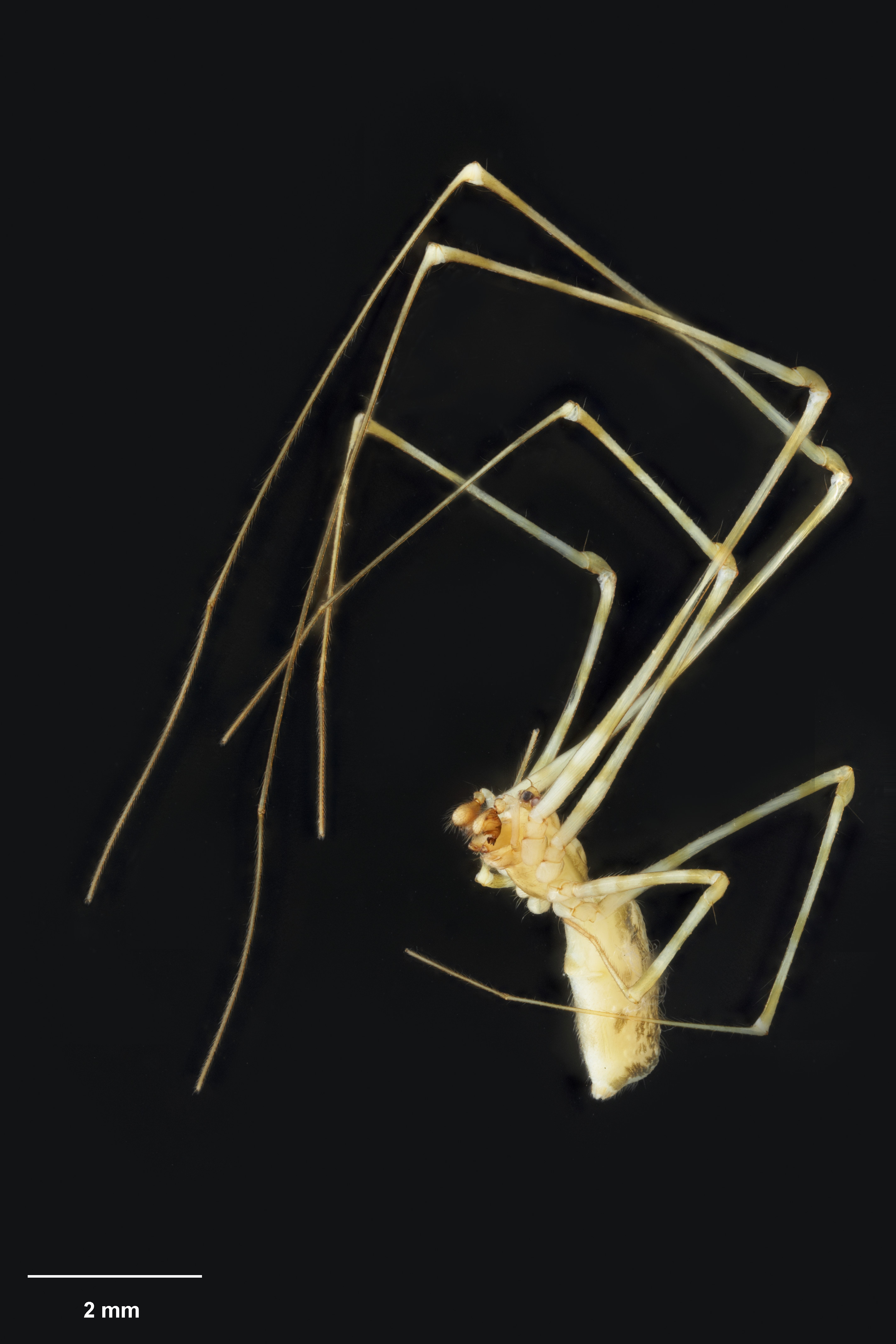

Conservation status
- Naturally Uncommon (NZ TCS)

Scientific classification
- Domain: Eukaryota
- Kingdom: Animalia
- Phylum: Arthropoda
- Subphylum: Chelicerata
- Class: Arachnida
- Order: Araneae
- Infraorder: Araneomorphae
- Family: Physoglenidae
- Genus: Nomaua
- Species: N. repanga

Binomial name
- Nomaua repanga Fitzgerald & Sirvid, 2009

= Nomaua repanga =

Species of spider

Nomaua repanga is a species of Physoglenidae spider endemic to New Zealand.

== Taxonomy ==
This species was described in 2009 by Mike Fitzgerald and Phil Sirvid from male and female specimens. The holotype is stored in Te Papa Museum under registration number AS.001496.

== Description ==
The male is recorded at 3.27mm in length whereas the female is 3.93mm.

== Distribution ==
This species is only known from Cuvier Island in New Zealand.

== Conservation status ==
Under the New Zealand Threat Classification System, this species is listed as "Naturally Uncommon" with the qualifier of "Range Restricted".
