= Pahoroides balli =

Conservation status
- Naturally Uncommon (NZ TCS)

Scientific classification
- Domain: Eukaryota
- Kingdom: Animalia
- Phylum: Arthropoda
- Subphylum: Chelicerata
- Class: Arachnida
- Order: Araneae
- Infraorder: Araneomorphae
- Family: Physoglenidae
- Genus: Pahoroides
- Species: P. balli

Binomial name
- Pahoroides balli Fitzgerald & Sirvid, 2011

Species of spider

Pahoroides balli is a species of Physoglenidae spider endemic to New Zealand.

== Taxonomy ==
This species was described in 2011 by Mike Fitzgerald and Phil Sirvid from male and female specimens. The holotype is stored in Te Papa Museum under registration number AS.001785.

== Description ==
The male is recorded at 2.21mm in length whereas the female is 1.89mm.

== Distribution ==
This species is only known from Northland, New Zealand.

== Conservation status ==
Under the New Zealand Threat Classification System, this species is listed as "Naturally Uncommon".
