= Pahora wiltoni =

Conservation status
- Data Deficit (NZ TCS)

Scientific classification
- Kingdom: Animalia
- Phylum: Arthropoda
- Subphylum: Chelicerata
- Class: Arachnida
- Order: Araneae
- Infraorder: Araneomorphae
- Family: Physoglenidae
- Genus: Pahora
- Species: P. wiltoni

Binomial name
- Pahora wiltoni Forster, 1990

Species of spider

Pahora wiltoni is a species of Physoglenidae spider endemic to New Zealand.

== Taxonomy ==
This species was described in 1990 by Ray Forster from male and female specimens. The holotype is stored in Otago Museum.

== Description ==
The male is recorded at 2.10mm in length whereas the female is 2.12mm. This species has a black carapace with pale markings. The abdomen is grey with pale markings dorsally.

== Distribution ==
This species is only known from Marlborough, New Zealand.

== Conservation status ==
Under the New Zealand Threat Classification System, this species is listed as "Data Deficient" with the qualifiers of "Data Poor: Size", "Data Poor: Trend" "One Location".
