= Meringa nelson =

Conservation status
- Data Deficit (NZ TCS)

Scientific classification
- Kingdom: Animalia
- Phylum: Arthropoda
- Subphylum: Chelicerata
- Class: Arachnida
- Order: Araneae
- Infraorder: Araneomorphae
- Family: Physoglenidae
- Genus: Meringa
- Species: M. nelson

Binomial name
- Meringa nelson Forster, 1990

Species of spider

Meringa nelson is a species of Physoglenidae spider endemic to New Zealand.

== Taxonomy ==
This species was described in 1990 by Ray Forster from a female specimen. The holotype is stored in Otago Museum.

== Description ==
The female is recorded at 2.02mm. This species has a dark carapace. The abdomen is dark with dorsal patterns.

== Distribution ==
This species is only known from Nelson, New Zealand.

== Conservation status ==
Under the New Zealand Threat Classification System, this species is listed as "Data Deficient" with the qualifiers of "Data Poor: Size" and "Data Poor: Trend".
