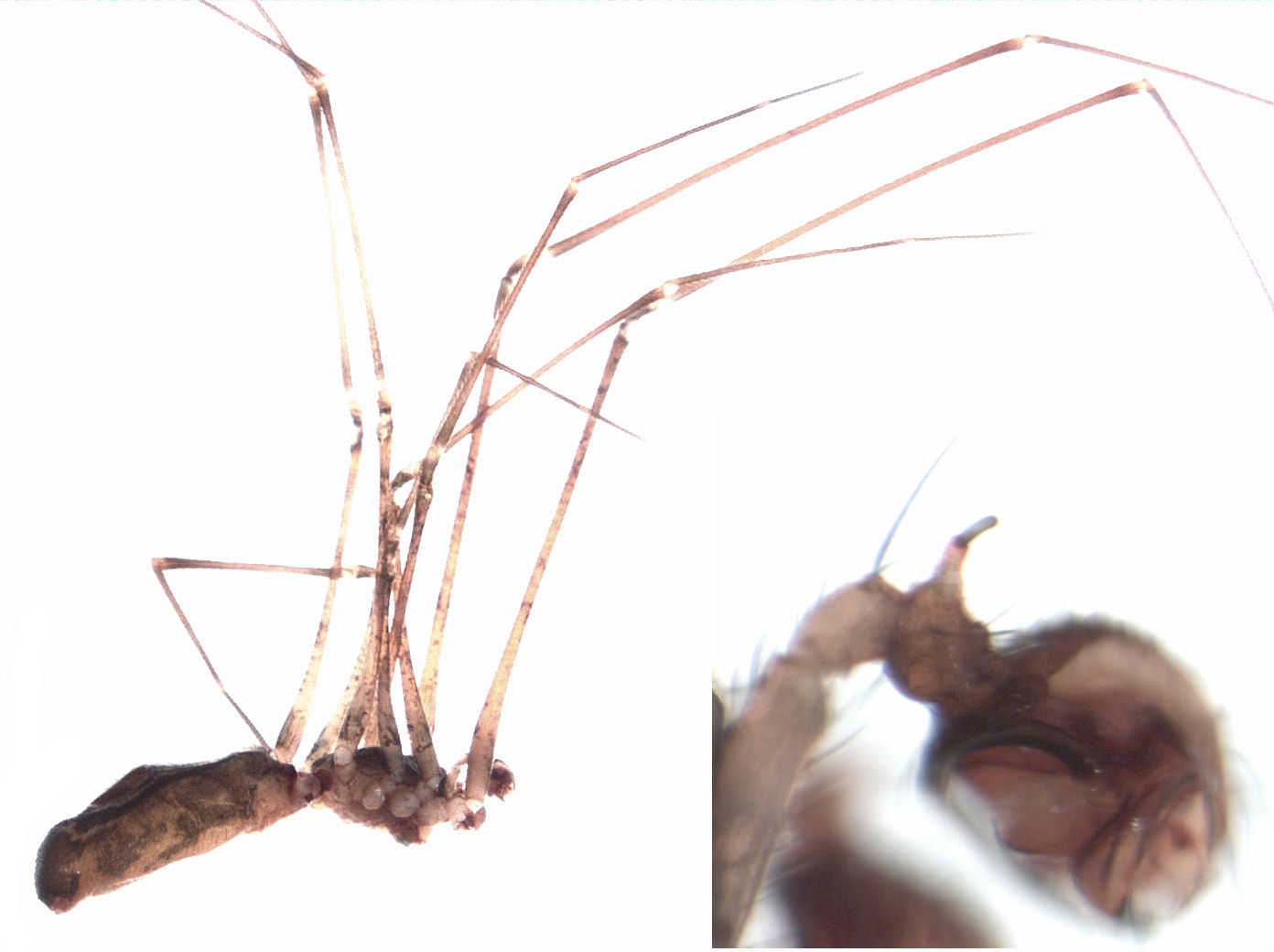
- Meringa sp. male

Scientific classification
- Kingdom: Animalia
- Phylum: Arthropoda
- Subphylum: Chelicerata
- Class: Arachnida
- Order: Araneae
- Infraorder: Araneomorphae
- Family: Physoglenidae
- Genus: Meringa; Forster, 1990

Type species
- M. otago Forster, 1990

Species
- 9, see text

= Meringa =

Genus of spiders

Meringa is a genus of araneomorph spiders in the family Physoglenidae that is endemic to New Zealand. It was first described by Raymond Robert Forster in 1990. Originally placed with the Synotaxidae, it was moved to the Physoglenidae in 2017.

== Species ==
As of September 2019 it contains nine species, found on New Zealand:

- Meringa australis Forster, 1990 – New Zealand
- Meringa borealis Forster, 1990 – New Zealand
- Meringa centralis Forster, 1990 – New Zealand
- Meringa conway Forster, 1990 – New Zealand
- Meringa hinaka Forster, 1990 – New Zealand
- Meringa leith Forster, 1990 – New Zealand
- Meringa nelson Forster, 1990 – New Zealand
- Meringa otago Forster, 1990 (type) – New Zealand
- Meringa tetragyna Forster, 1990 – New Zealand
