= Calcarsynotaxus =

Scientific classification
- Kingdom: Animalia
- Phylum: Arthropoda
- Subphylum: Chelicerata
- Class: Arachnida
- Order: Araneae
- Infraorder: Araneomorphae
- Family: Physoglenidae
- Genus: Calcarsynotaxus; Wunderlich, 1995

Type species
- C. longipes Wunderlich, 1995

Species
- C. benrobertsi Rix, Roberts & Harvey, 2009 – Australia (Western Australia); C. longipes Wunderlich, 1995 – Australia (Queensland)

Genus of spiders

Calcarsynotaxus is a genus of Australian araneomorph spiders in the family Physoglenidae, and was first described by J. Wunderlich in 1995. As of September 2019 it contains two species, found in Queensland and Western Australia: C. benrobertsi and C. longipes.
