= Physoglenes =

Scientific classification
- Kingdom: Animalia
- Phylum: Arthropoda
- Subphylum: Chelicerata
- Class: Arachnida
- Order: Araneae
- Infraorder: Araneomorphae
- Family: Physoglenidae
- Genus: Physoglenes; Simon, 1904

Type species
- P. vivesi Simon, 1904

Species
- 4, see text

Genus of spiders

Physoglenes is a genus of Chilean araneomorph spiders in the family Physoglenidae that was first described by Eugène Louis Simon in 1904. It has been listed under several different families, including Leptonetidae, Pholcidae, Synotaxidae, and most recently, Physoglenidae.

== Species ==
As of September 2019 it contains four species, found in Chile:

- Physoglenes chepu Platnick, 1990 – Chile
- Physoglenes lagos Platnick, 1990 – Chile
- Physoglenes puyehue Platnick, 1990 – Chile
- Physoglenes vivesi Simon, 1904 (type) – Chile
