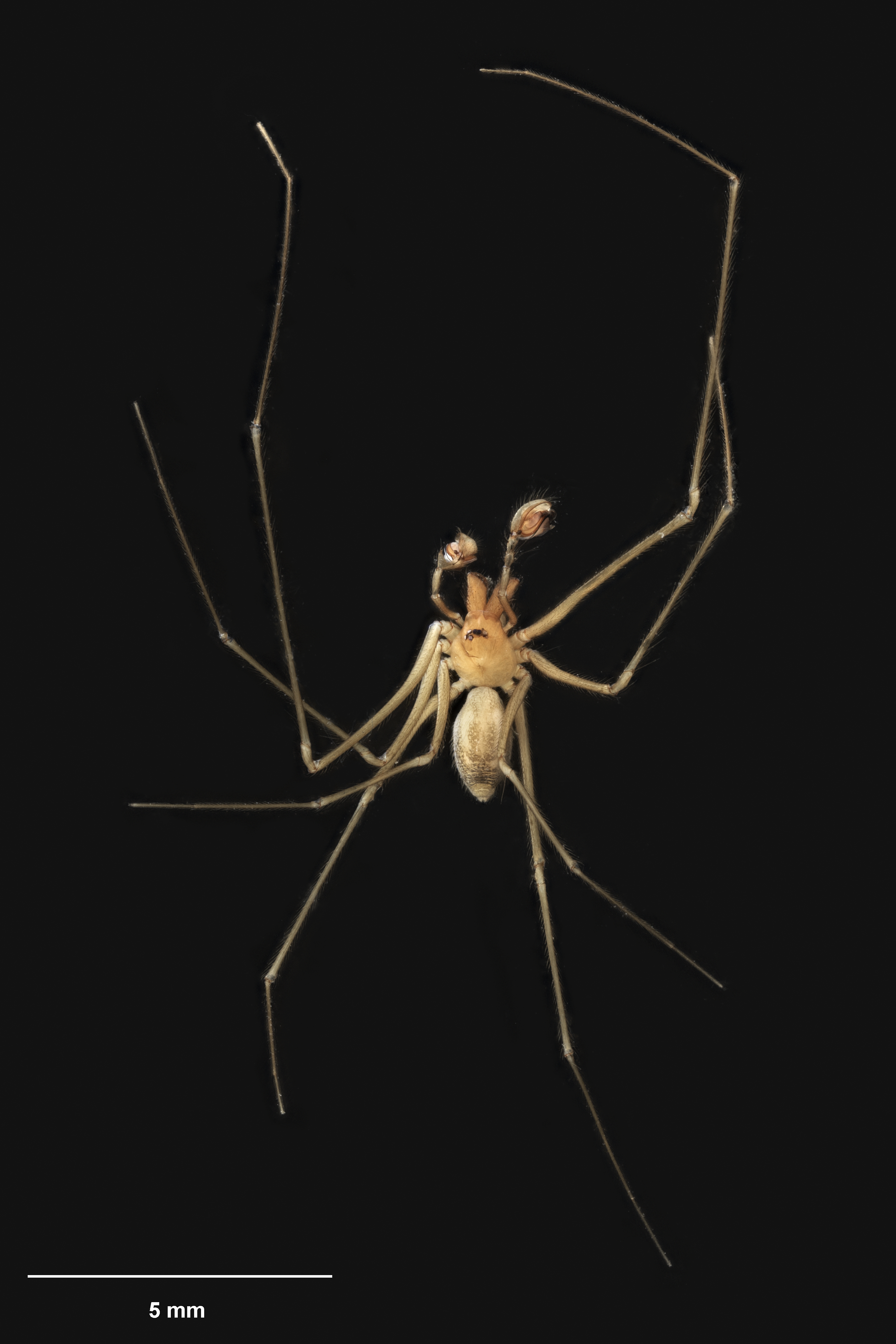
- Holotype specimen

Conservation status
- Data Deficit (NZ TCS)

Scientific classification
- Kingdom: Animalia
- Phylum: Arthropoda
- Subphylum: Chelicerata
- Class: Arachnida
- Order: Araneae
- Infraorder: Araneomorphae
- Family: Physoglenidae
- Genus: Zeatupua; Fitzgerald & Sirvid, 2009
- Species: Z. forsteri

Binomial name
- Zeatupua forsteri Fitzgerald & Sirvid, 2009

= Zeatupua =

Genus of spiders

Zeatupua is a monotypic genus of araneomorph spiders in the family Physoglenidae containing the single species, Zeatupua forsteri. It was first described by Fitzgerald & Sirvid in 2009, and is found in New Zealand.

== Taxonomy ==
This species was first described in 2009 by Mike Fitzgerald and Phil Sirvid from male specimens. Originally placed with the Synotaxidae, it was moved to the Physoglenidae in 2017. The holotype is stored in Te Papa Museum under registration number AS.001487.

== Description ==
The male is recorded at 3.07mm in length. This species has a pale orange brown carapace and legs. The abdomen is straw coloured with dark shading and pale markings dorsally.

== Distribution ==
This species is only known from Wellington, New Zealand.

== Conservation status ==
Under the New Zealand Threat Classification System, this species is listed as "Data Deficient" with the qualifiers of "Data Poor: Size" and "Data Poor: Trend".
