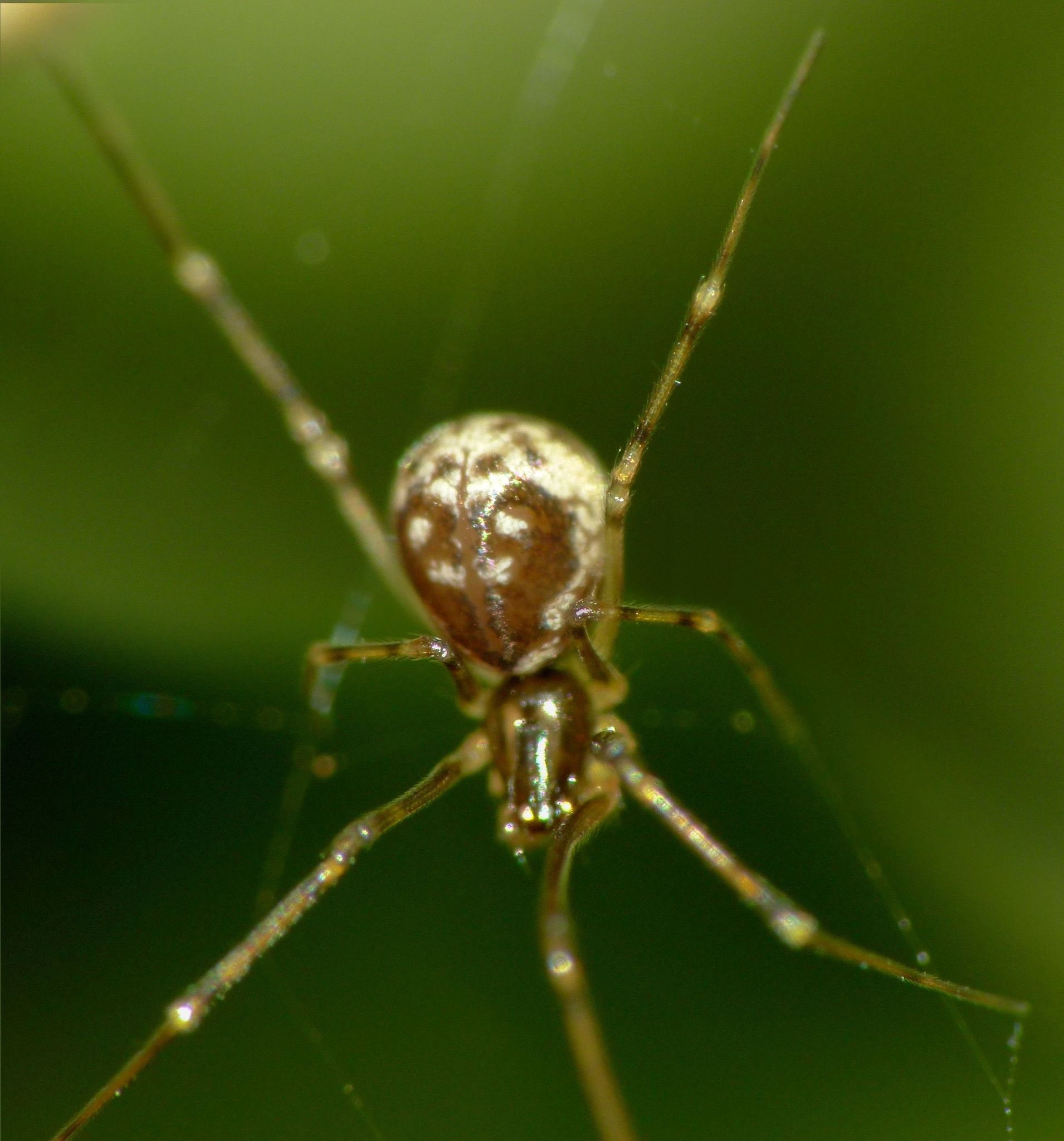
- Pahora spp.

Scientific classification
- Kingdom: Animalia
- Phylum: Arthropoda
- Subphylum: Chelicerata
- Class: Arachnida
- Order: Araneae
- Infraorder: Araneomorphae
- Family: Physoglenidae
- Genus: Pahora; Forster, 1990

Type species
- P. murihiku Forster, 1990

Species
- 9, see text

= Pahora =

Genus of spiders

Pahora is a genus of Polynesian araneomorph spiders in the family Physoglenidae that was first described by Raymond Robert Forster in 1990. Originally placed with the Synotaxidae, it was moved to the Physoglenidae in 2017.

== Species ==
As of September 2019 it contains nine species, all found on New Zealand:

- Pahora cantuaria Forster, 1990 – New Zealand
- Pahora graminicola Forster, 1990 – New Zealand
- Pahora kaituna Forster, 1990 – New Zealand
- Pahora media Forster, 1990 – New Zealand
- Pahora montana Forster, 1990 – New Zealand
- Pahora murihiku Forster, 1990 (type) – New Zealand
- Pahora rakiura Forster, 1990 – New Zealand
- Pahora taranaki Forster, 1990 – New Zealand
- Pahora wiltoni Forster, 1990 – New Zealand
