= Mangua =

Scientific classification
- Kingdom: Animalia
- Phylum: Arthropoda
- Subphylum: Chelicerata
- Class: Arachnida
- Order: Araneae
- Infraorder: Araneomorphae
- Family: Physoglenidae
- Genus: Mangua; Forster, 1990

Type species
- M. gunni Forster, 1990

Species
- 14, see text

Genus of spiders

Mangua is a genus of araneomorph spiders in the family Physoglenidae that first described by Raymond Robert Forster in 1990. Originally placed with the Synotaxidae, it was moved to the Stiphidiidae in 2017.

== Species ==
As of September 2019 it contains fourteen species, found in New Zealand:

- Mangua caswell Forster, 1990 – New Zealand
- Mangua convoluta Forster, 1990 – New Zealand
- Mangua flora Forster, 1990 – New Zealand
- Mangua forsteri (Brignoli, 1983) – New Zealand (Auckland Is., Campbell Is.)
- Mangua gunni Forster, 1990 (type) – New Zealand
- Mangua hughsoni Forster, 1990 – New Zealand
- Mangua kapiti Forster, 1990 – New Zealand
- Mangua makarora Forster, 1990 – New Zealand
- Mangua medialis Forster, 1990 – New Zealand
- Mangua oparara Forster, 1990 – New Zealand
- Mangua otira Forster, 1990 – New Zealand
- Mangua paringa Forster, 1990 – New Zealand
- Mangua sana Forster, 1990 – New Zealand
- Mangua secunda Forster, 1990 – New Zealand
