= Paratupua =

Scientific classification
- Kingdom: Animalia
- Phylum: Arthropoda
- Subphylum: Chelicerata
- Class: Arachnida
- Order: Araneae
- Infraorder: Araneomorphae
- Family: Physoglenidae
- Genus: Paratupua; Platnick, 1990
- Species: P. grayi

Binomial name
- Paratupua grayi Platnick, 1990

Genus of spiders

Paratupua is a monotypic genus of araneomorph spiders in the family Physoglenidae found in Victoria, Australia. It contains the single species, Paratupua grayi. Though it's sometimes misspelled Paratupa, the correct spelling is "Paratupua".

Both genus and species were first described by Norman I. Platnick in 1990, who placed it with the Synotaxidae. In 2017, it was moved to the Physoglenidae.
