= Microsynotaxus =

Scientific classification
- Kingdom: Animalia
- Phylum: Arthropoda
- Subphylum: Chelicerata
- Class: Arachnida
- Order: Araneae
- Infraorder: Araneomorphae
- Family: Physoglenidae
- Genus: Microsynotaxus; Wunderlich, 2008

Type species
- M. insolens Wunderlich, 2008

Species
- M. calliope Wunderlich, 2008 – Australia (Queensland); M. insolens Wunderlich, 2008 – Australia (Queensland)

Genus of spiders

Microsynotaxus is a genus of Australian araneomorph spiders in the family Physoglenidae that was first described by J. Wunderlich in 2008. As of September 2019 it contains two species, both found in Queensland: M. calliope and M. insolens.
