= Runga =

Scientific classification
- Kingdom: Animalia
- Phylum: Arthropoda
- Subphylum: Chelicerata
- Class: Arachnida
- Order: Araneae
- Infraorder: Araneomorphae
- Family: Physoglenidae
- Genus: Runga; Forster, 1990

Type species
- R. nina Forster, 1990

Species
- 5, see text

Genus of spiders

Runga is a genus of New Zealand araneomorph spiders in the family Physoglenidae that was first described by Raymond Robert Forster in 1990.

== Species ==
As of January 2026, this genus includes five species:

- Runga akaroa Forster, 1990 – New Zealand
- Runga flora Forster, 1990 – New Zealand
- Runga moana Forster, 1990 – New Zealand
- Runga nina Forster, 1990 – New Zealand
- Runga raroa Forster, 1990 – New Zealand
