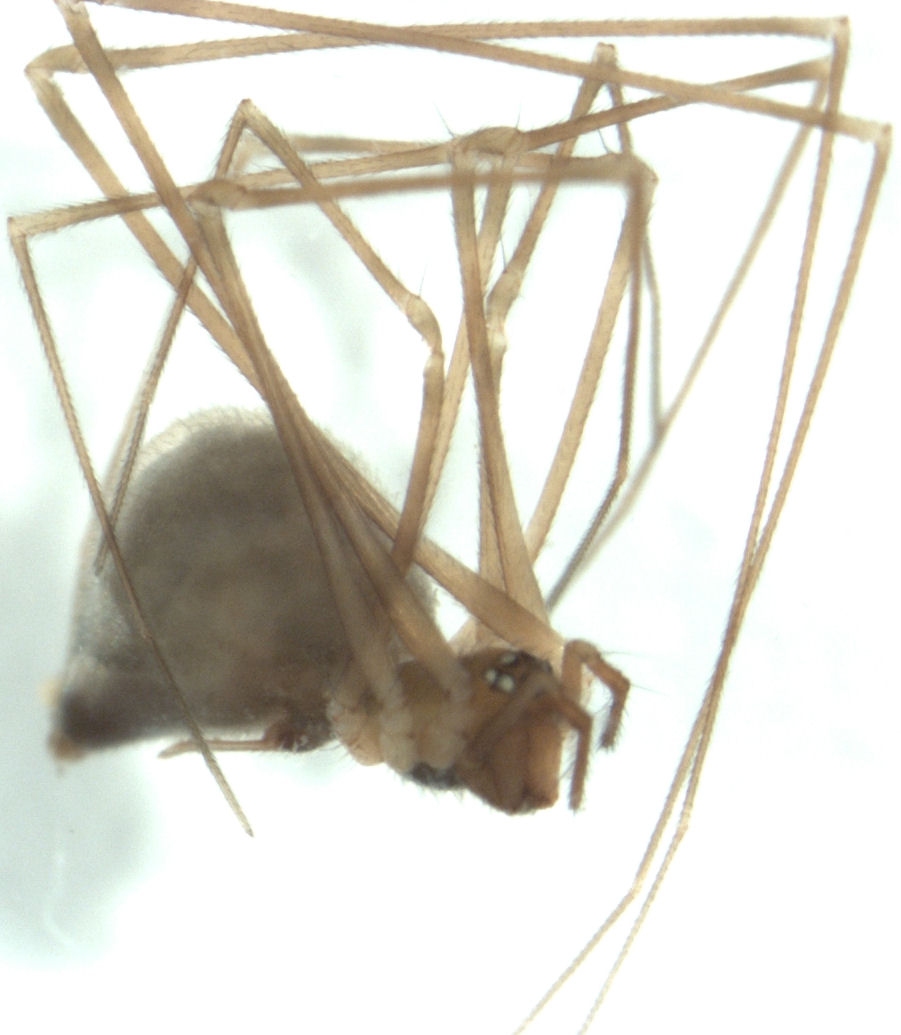
- P. courti female

Scientific classification
- Kingdom: Animalia
- Phylum: Arthropoda
- Subphylum: Chelicerata
- Class: Arachnida
- Order: Araneae
- Infraorder: Araneomorphae
- Family: Physoglenidae
- Genus: Pahoroides; Forster, 1990

Type species
- P. whangarei Forster, 1990

Species
- 8, see text

= Pahoroides =

Genus of spiders

Pahoroides is a genus of Polynesian araneomorph spiders in the family Physoglenidae that was first described by Raymond Robert Forster in 1990.

== Species ==
As of September 2019 it contains eight species, found on the Polynesian Islands:

- Pahoroides aucklandica Fitzgerald & Sirvid, 2011 – New Zealand
- Pahoroides balli Fitzgerald & Sirvid, 2011 – New Zealand
- Pahoroides confusa Fitzgerald & Sirvid, 2011 – New Zealand
- Pahoroides courti Forster, 1990 – New Zealand
- Pahoroides forsteri Fitzgerald & Sirvid, 2011 – New Zealand
- Pahoroides gallina Fitzgerald & Sirvid, 2011 – New Zealand
- Pahoroides kohukohu Fitzgerald & Sirvid, 2011 – New Zealand
- Pahoroides whangarei Forster, 1990 (type) – New Zealand
