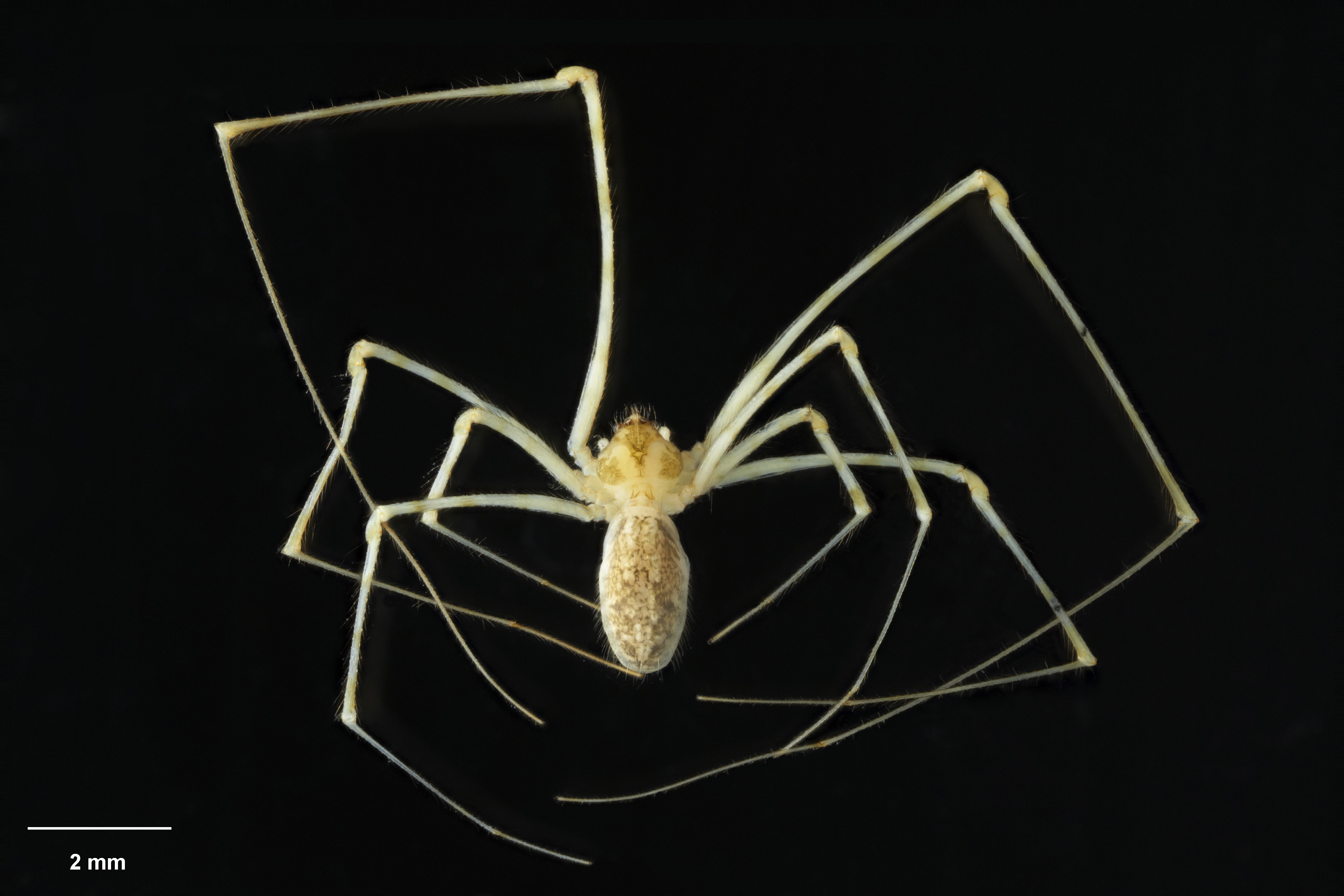
- Nomaua rimutaka

Scientific classification
- Kingdom: Animalia
- Phylum: Arthropoda
- Subphylum: Chelicerata
- Class: Arachnida
- Order: Araneae
- Infraorder: Araneomorphae
- Family: Physoglenidae
- Genus: Nomaua; Forster, 1990

Type species
- N. crinifrons (Urquhart, 1891)

Species
- 12, see text

Synonyms
- Wairua Forster, 1990

= Nomaua =

Genus of spiders

Nomaua is a genus of Polynesian araneomorph spiders in the family Physoglenidae that was first described by Raymond Robert Forster in 1990. Originally placed with the Linyphiidae, it was moved to the Synotaxidae in 1990, and is now considered a senior synonym of Wairua.

== Species ==
As of September 2019 it contains twelve species, found on the Polynesian Islands:

- Nomaua arborea Forster, 1990 – New Zealand
- Nomaua cauda Forster, 1990 – New Zealand
- Nomaua crinifrons (Urquhart, 1891) (type) – New Zealand
- Nomaua nelson Forster, 1990 – New Zealand
- Nomaua perdita Forster, 1990 – New Zealand
- Nomaua rakiura Fitzgerald & Sirvid, 2009 – New Zealand (Stewart Is.)
- Nomaua repanga Fitzgerald & Sirvid, 2009 – New Zealand
- Nomaua rimutaka Fitzgerald & Sirvid, 2009 – New Zealand
- Nomaua taranga Fitzgerald & Sirvid, 2009 – New Zealand
- Nomaua urquharti Fitzgerald & Sirvid, 2009 – New Zealand
- Nomaua waikanae (Forster, 1990) – New Zealand
- Nomaua waikaremoana Forster, 1990 – New Zealand
