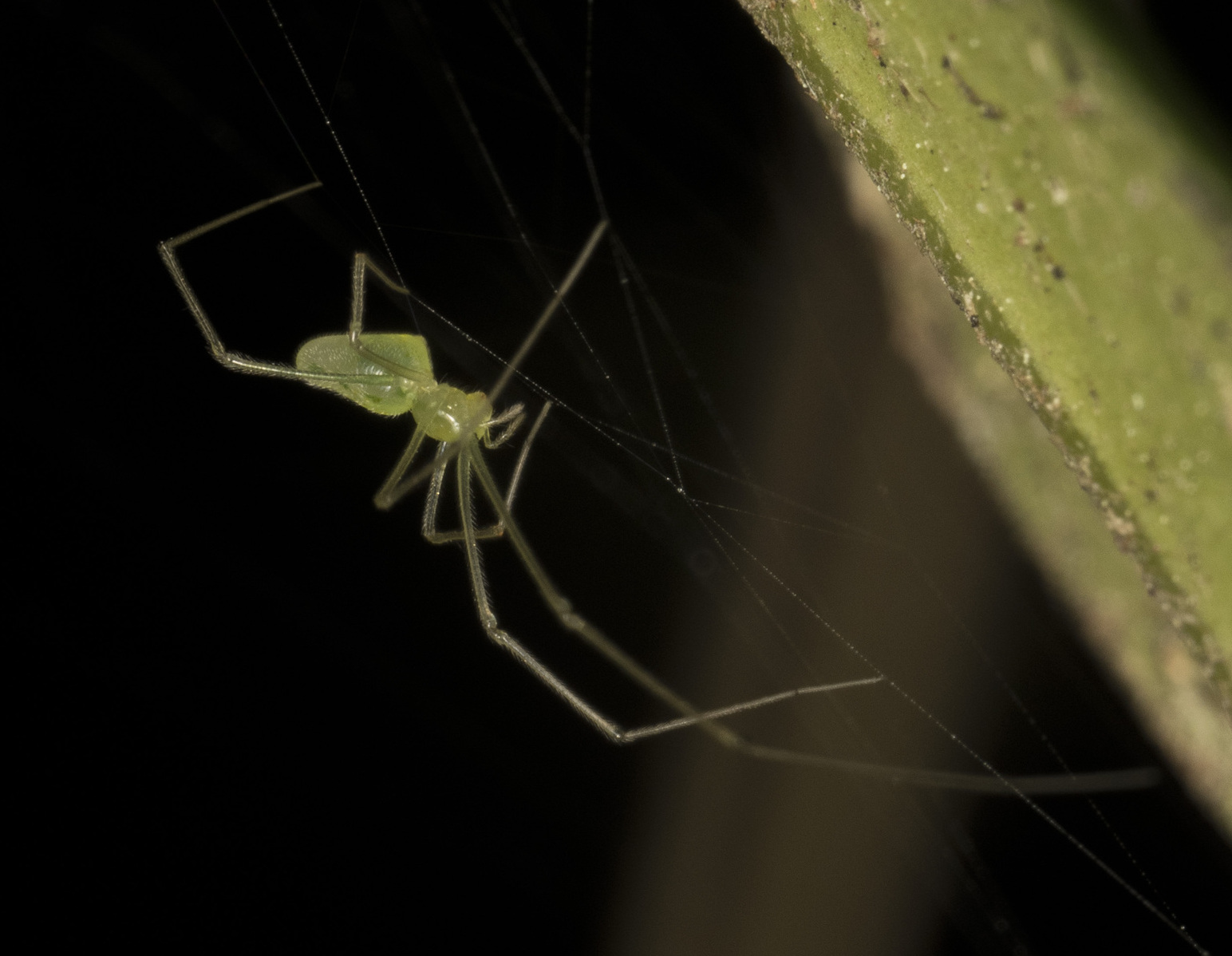
- C. sans in Chile

Scientific classification
- Kingdom: Animalia
- Phylum: Arthropoda
- Subphylum: Chelicerata
- Class: Arachnida
- Order: Araneae
- Infraorder: Araneomorphae
- Family: Physoglenidae
- Genus: Chileotaxus; Platnick, 1990
- Species: C. sans

Binomial name
- Chileotaxus sans Platnick, 1990

= Chileotaxus =

Genus of spiders

Chileotaxus is a monotypic genus of Chilean araneomorph spiders in the family Physoglenidae, containing the single species Chileotaxus sans. It was first described by Norman I. Platnick in 1990, and is found in Chile. Originally placed with the Synotaxidae, it was moved to the Physoglenidae in 1973. The generic name is a contraction of "Chilean Synotaxus", and the specific name is an arbitrary combination of letters.

== Description ==
Chileotaxus sans is a green spider with long, spineless legs and a triangular abdomen. Adults range from 1.9 to 2.3 mm in length. The carapace is longer than it is wide, and narrows towards the anterior end.

The eyes cover almost the entire width of the head region. The MOQ forms a trapezium which is wider towards the rear, and with the AME closer together than the PME. The AME are darker and smaller than the other eyes, and the clypeal height is approximately four times the diameter of the AME.

== Habitat and description ==
The species is found in wet forests in Chile, under the leaves of trees and shrubs. They construct a dome shaped sheet-web, with the apex underneath a leaf.
