= Tupua (spider) =

Scientific classification
- Kingdom: Animalia
- Phylum: Arthropoda
- Subphylum: Chelicerata
- Class: Arachnida
- Order: Araneae
- Infraorder: Araneomorphae
- Family: Physoglenidae
- Genus: Tupua; Platnick, 1990

Type species
- T. bisetosa Platnick, 1990

Species
- 4, see text

Genus of spiders

Tupua is a genus of Tasmanian araneomorph spiders in the family Physoglenidae that was first described by Norman I. Platnick in 1990.

== Species ==
As of September 2019 it contains four species, found in Tasmania:

- Tupua bisetosa Platnick, 1990 (type) – Australia (Tasmania)
- Tupua cavernicola Platnick, 1990 – Australia (Tasmania)
- Tupua raveni Platnick, 1990 – Australia (Tasmania)
- Tupua troglodytes Platnick, 1990 – Australia (Tasmania)
