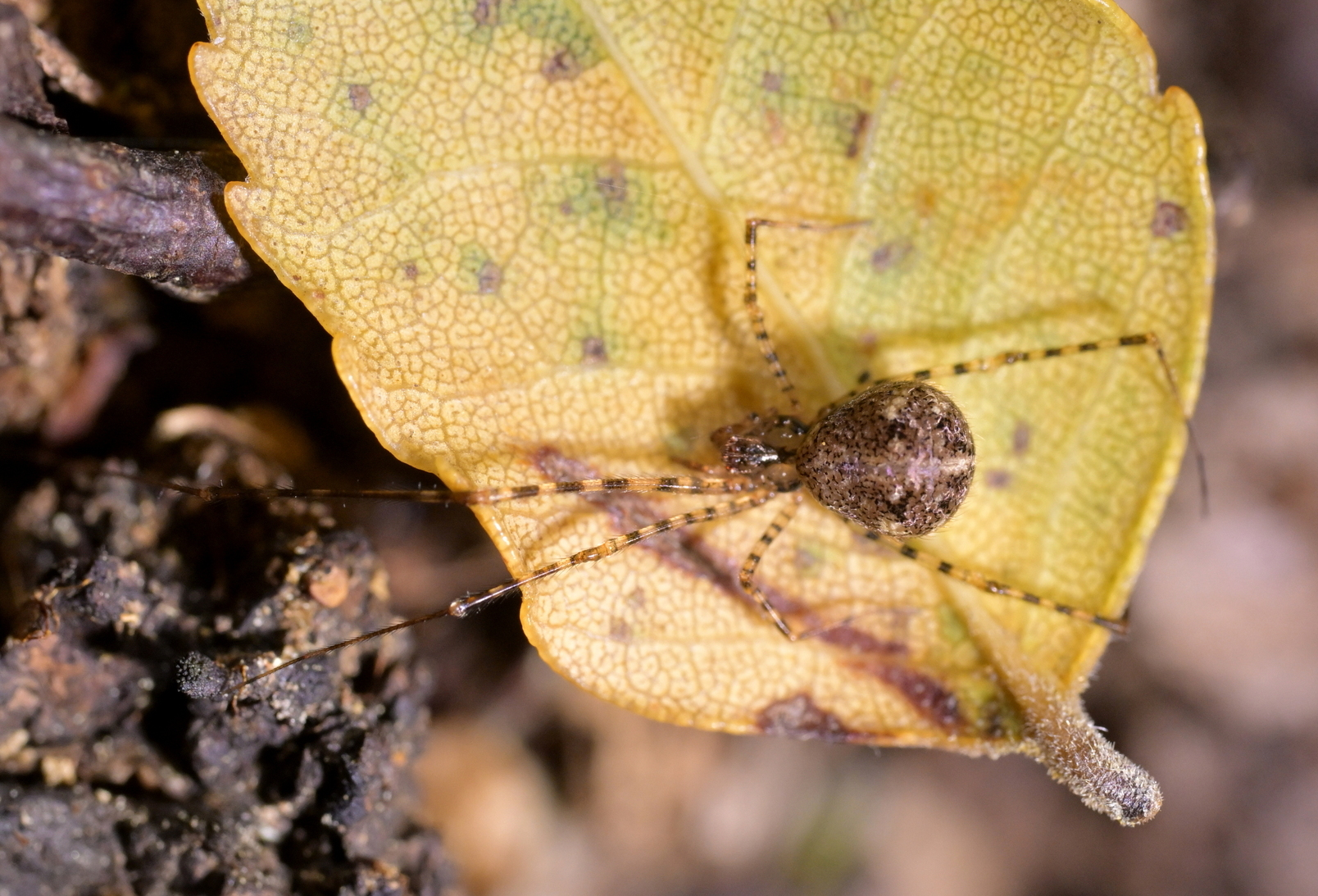
- Nomaua sp. in New Zealand
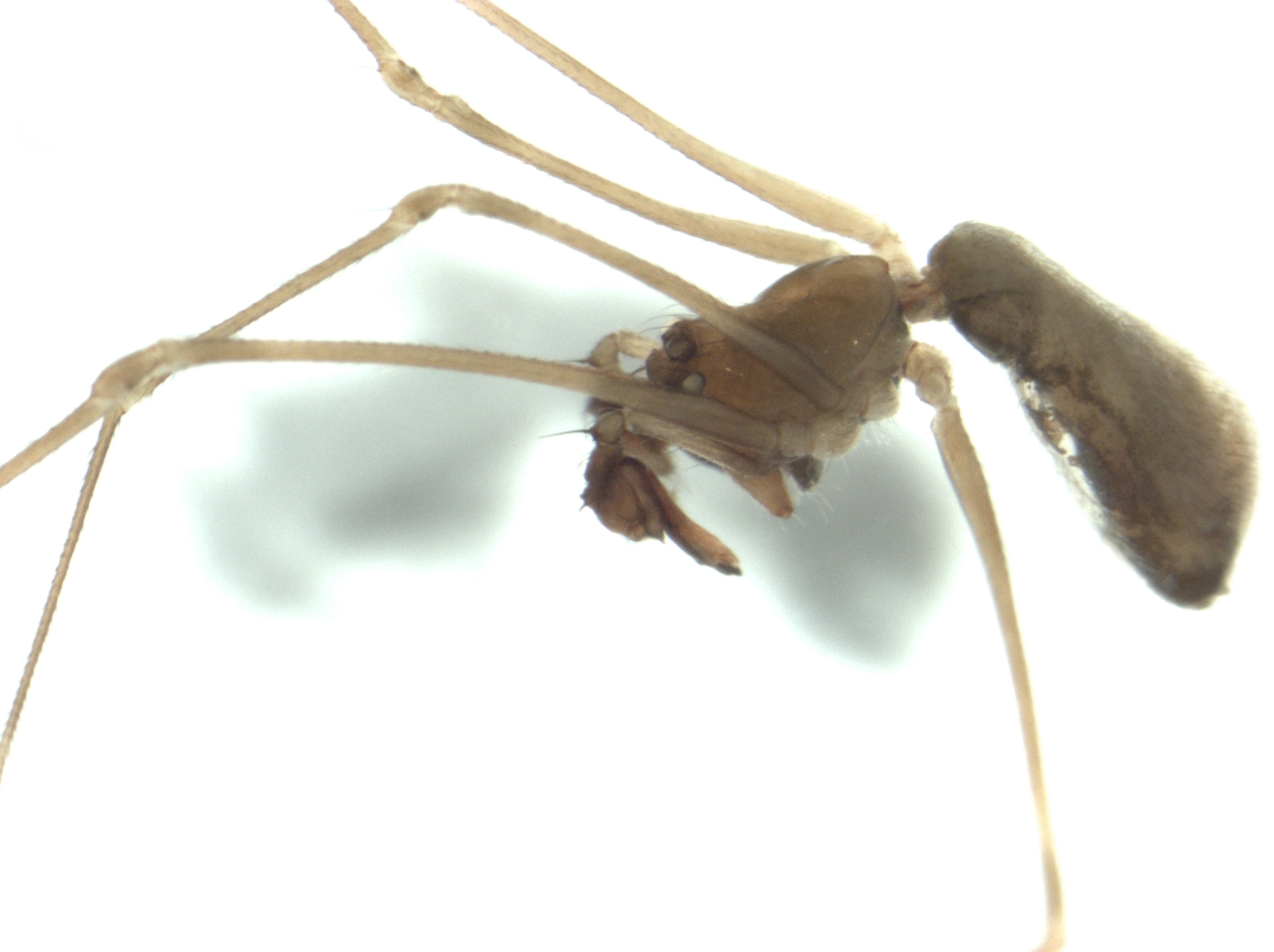
- male Pahoroides sp.

Scientific classification
- Kingdom: Animalia
- Phylum: Arthropoda
- Subphylum: Chelicerata
- Class: Arachnida
- Order: Araneae
- Infraorder: Araneomorphae
- Family: Physoglenidae; Petrunkevitch, 1928

Diversity
- 13 genera, 72 species
- blue: reported countries (WSC) green: observation hotspots (iNaturalist)

= Physoglenidae =

Family of spiders

Physoglenidae is a family of araneomorph spiders first described by Alexander Petrunkevitch in 1928 as a subfamily of Pholcidae. It was later moved to Synotaxidae until a study in 2016 showed that they formed a distinct clade.

== Genera ==
As of January 2026, this family includes thirteen genera and 72 species:

- Calcarsynotaxus Wunderlich, 1995 – Australia
- Chileotaxus Platnick, 1990 – Chile
- Mangua Forster, 1990 – New Zealand
- Meringa Forster, 1990 – New Zealand
- Microsynotaxus Wunderlich, 2008 – Australia
- Nomaua Forster, 1990 – New Zealand
- Pahora Forster, 1990 – New Zealand
- Pahoroides Forster, 1990 – New Zealand
- Paratupua Platnick, 1990 – Australia
- Physoglenes Simon, 1904 – Chile
- Runga Forster, 1990 – New Zealand
- Tupua Platnick, 1990 – Australia
- Zeatupua Fitzgerald & Sirvid, 2009 – New Zealand
