= Anoteropsis blesti =

Conservation status
- Naturally Uncommon (NZ TCS)

Scientific classification
- Kingdom: Animalia
- Phylum: Arthropoda
- Subphylum: Chelicerata
- Class: Arachnida
- Order: Araneae
- Infraorder: Araneomorphae
- Family: Lycosidae
- Genus: Anoteropsis
- Species: A. blesti

Binomial name
- Anoteropsis blesti Vink, 2002

Species of spider

Anoteropsis blesti is a species of Lycosidae that is endemic to New Zealand.

== Taxonomy ==
This species was described in 2002 by Cor Vink from male and female specimens. The holotype is stored in the Lincoln University Entomology Research Collection.

== Description ==
The male is recorded at 5.0-7.6mm in length whereas the female is 5.9-12.5mm. The carapace is coloured orange black with black markings dorsally. The legs are yellow brown with blackish markings. The abdomen is orange brown with a variety of markings dorsally. It is most reliably distinguished from other Anoteropsis by the morphology of its genitalia.

== Distribution and habitat ==
This species is only known from the northern section of New Zealand's North Island. It typically occurs along rivers.

== Conservation status ==
Under the New Zealand Threat Classification System, this species is listed as "Naturally Uncommon" with the qualifier of "Range Restricted".
