= Anoteropsis westlandica =

Conservation status
- Not Threatened (NZ TCS)

Scientific classification
- Kingdom: Animalia
- Phylum: Arthropoda
- Subphylum: Chelicerata
- Class: Arachnida
- Order: Araneae
- Infraorder: Araneomorphae
- Family: Lycosidae
- Genus: Anoteropsis
- Species: A. westlandica

Binomial name
- Anoteropsis westlandica Vink, 2002

Species of spider

Anoteropsis westlandica is a species of Lycosidae spider that is endemic to New Zealand.

== Taxonomy ==
This species was described in 2002 by Cor Vink from male and female specimens. The holotype is stored in the Lincoln University Entomology Research Collection.

== Description ==
The male is recorded at 6.3mm in length whereas the female is 7.2mm. The carapace is coloured brown with yellowish stripes. The legs are yellow brown with bands. The abdomen is dark brown with a light heart stripe dorsally.

== Distribution ==
This species is only known from the western section of New Zealand's South Island.

== Conservation status ==
Under the New Zealand Threat Classification System, this species is listed as "Not Threatened".
