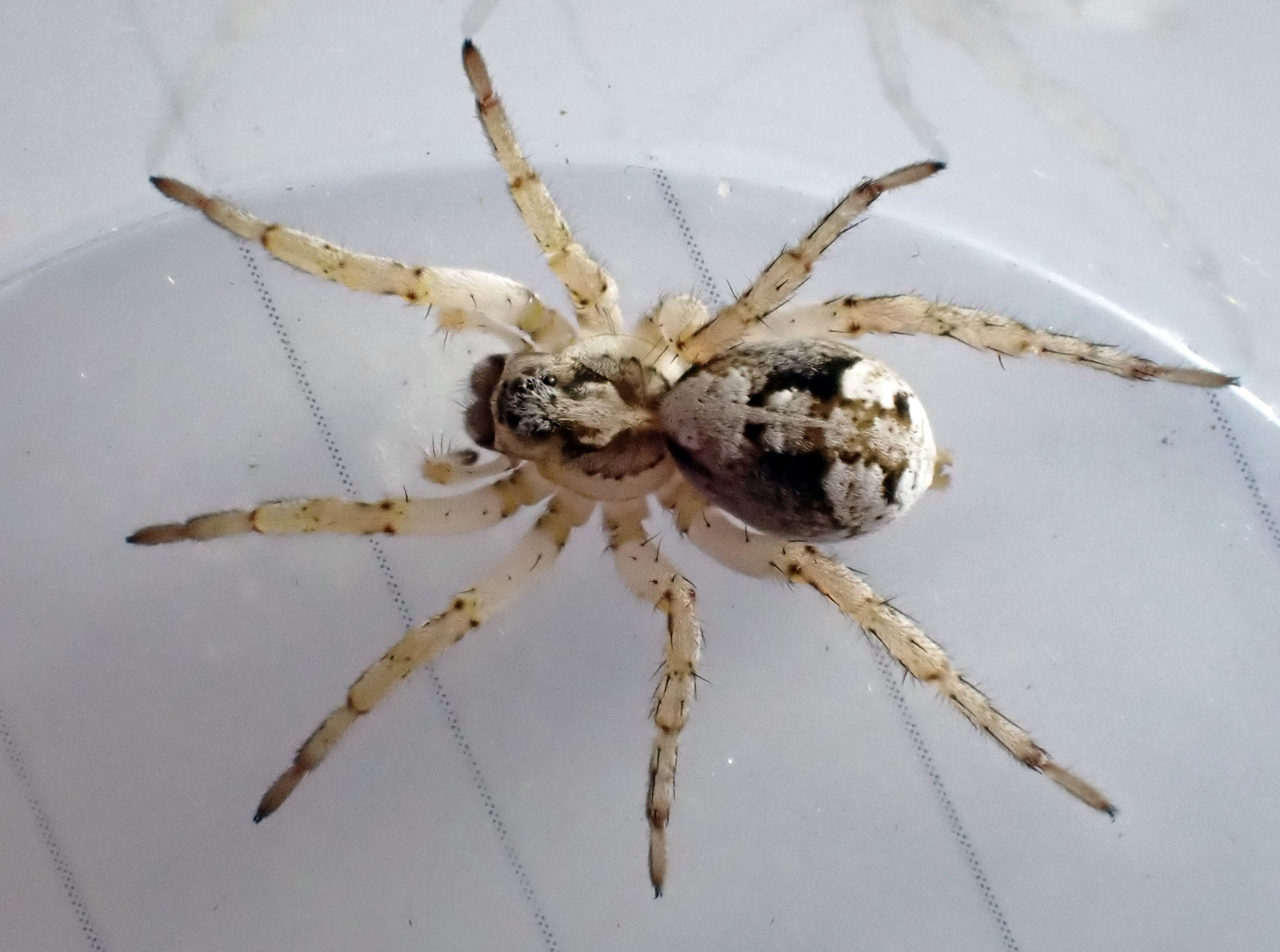

Conservation status
- Naturally Uncommon (NZ TCS)

Scientific classification
- Kingdom: Animalia
- Phylum: Arthropoda
- Subphylum: Chelicerata
- Class: Arachnida
- Order: Araneae
- Infraorder: Araneomorphae
- Family: Lycosidae
- Genus: Anoteropsis
- Species: A. insularis

Binomial name
- Anoteropsis insularis Vink, 2002

= Anoteropsis insularis =

Species of spider

Anoteropsis insularis is a species of Lycosidae spider that is endemic to New Zealand.

== Taxonomy ==
This species was described in 2002 by Cor Vink from male and female specimens. The holotype is stored in the Lincoln University Entomology Research Collection.

== Description ==
The male is recorded at 6.4-8.5mm in length whereas the female is 8.2-9.1mm. The colouration of the body camouflages it in sandy habitats. The carapace is coloured yellow with dark markings dorsally. The legs are pale yellow with black patches. The abdomen is yellow with a variety of dark and pale markings.

== Distribution and habitat ==
This species is only known from Chatham Island and Pitt Island in New Zealand. It occurs in sand dunes where it blends in with the background.

== Conservation status ==
Under the New Zealand Threat Classification System, this species is listed as "Naturally Uncommon" with the qualifier of "Range Restricted".
