= Anoteropsis okatainae =

Conservation status
- Naturally Uncommon (NZ TCS)

Scientific classification
- Kingdom: Animalia
- Phylum: Arthropoda
- Subphylum: Chelicerata
- Class: Arachnida
- Order: Araneae
- Infraorder: Araneomorphae
- Family: Lycosidae
- Genus: Anoteropsis
- Species: A. okatainae

Binomial name
- Anoteropsis okatainae Vink, 2002

Species of spider

Anoteropsis okatainae is a species of Lycosidae spider that is endemic to New Zealand.

== Taxonomy ==
This species was described in 2002 by Cor Vink from male and female specimens. The holotype is stored in the Lincoln University Entomology Research Collection.

== Description ==
The male is recorded at 5.1mm in length whereas the female is 6.6mm. The carapace is coloured yellow brown with blackish bands. The legs are orange brown with blackish bands. The abdomen has a yellow heart shape dorsally and various red brown to black patches.

== Distribution ==
This species is only known from Lake Okataina, New Zealand. It only occurs along the gravel shores.

== Conservation status ==
Under the New Zealand Threat Classification System, this species is listed as "Naturally Uncommon" with the qualifier of "Range Restricted".
