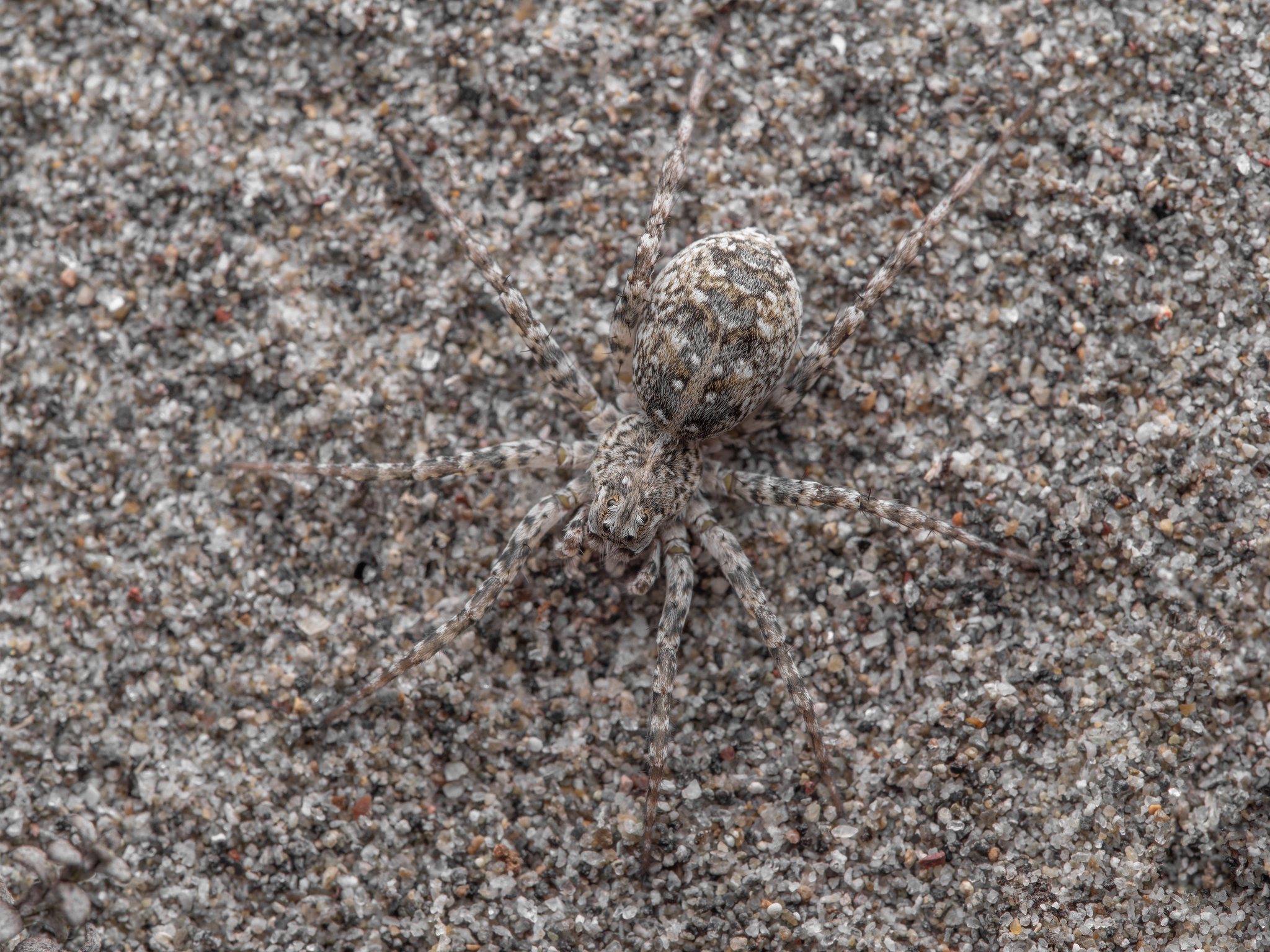

Conservation status
- Naturally Uncommon (NZ TCS)

Scientific classification
- Kingdom: Animalia
- Phylum: Arthropoda
- Subphylum: Chelicerata
- Class: Arachnida
- Order: Araneae
- Infraorder: Araneomorphae
- Family: Lycosidae
- Genus: Anoteropsis
- Species: A. litoralis

Binomial name
- Anoteropsis litoralis Vink, 2002

= Anoteropsis litoralis =

Species of spider

Anoteropsis litoralis is a species of wolf spider that is endemic to New Zealand.

== Taxonomy and etymology ==
This species was described in 2002 by Cor Vink. The holotype is stored in the Lincoln University Entomology Research Collection. The name "litoralis" refers to the seashore habitat of the species.

== Description ==
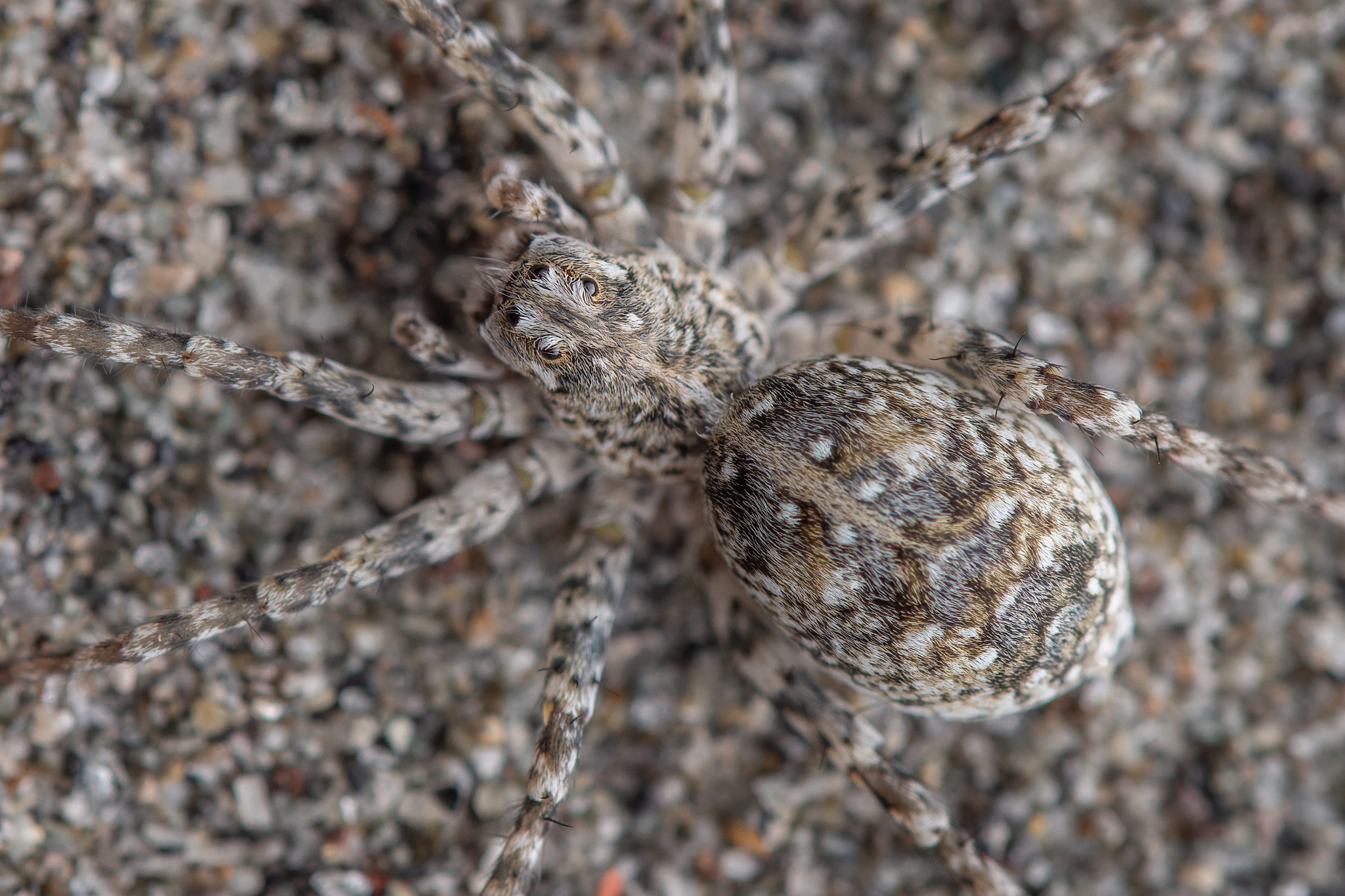

This species can be distinguished from other species of Anoteropsis by its yellow dorsal surface with black markings and several unique features in the male and female reproductive organs. The colouration of this species allows it to easily be camouflaged in sand.

== Habitat and distribution ==
Anoteropsis litoralis occupies sand dunes and beaches along the coast. They can be found in these habitats north of 44°S in New Zealand (Many habitats to the south are typically occupied by Anoteropsis forsteri, a similar species).

== Conservation status ==
Under the New Zealand Threat Classification System, this species is listed as "Naturally Uncommon" with the qualifiers of "Climate Impact", "Data Poor: Trend" and "Range Restricted".
