= Anoteropsis lacustris =

Conservation status
- Naturally Uncommon (NZ TCS)

Scientific classification
- Kingdom: Animalia
- Phylum: Arthropoda
- Subphylum: Chelicerata
- Class: Arachnida
- Order: Araneae
- Infraorder: Araneomorphae
- Family: Lycosidae
- Genus: Anoteropsis
- Species: A. lacustris

Binomial name
- Anoteropsis lacustris Vink, 2002

Species of spider

Anoteropsis lacustris is a species of Lycosidae spider that is endemic to New Zealand.

== Taxonomy ==
This species was described in 2002 by Cor Vink from male and female specimens. The holotype is stored in the Lincoln University Entomology Research Collection.

== Description ==
The male is recorded at 11.1mm in length whereas the female is 13.3mm. The carapace is coloured dark orange brown and has black stripes and white hairs. The legs are yellow brown with blackish bands. The abdomen is grey. This species can be distinguished from other Anoteropsis by differences in the structure of male and female genitalia.

== Distribution/habitat ==
This species is widespread throughout the South Island of New Zealand. It is known to occur along stony river banks and lake shore lines.

== Conservation status ==
Under the New Zealand Threat Classification System, this species is listed as "Naturally Uncommon" with the qualifier of "Range Restricted".
