= Anoteropsis hallae =

Conservation status
- Data Deficit (NZ TCS)

Scientific classification
- Kingdom: Animalia
- Phylum: Arthropoda
- Subphylum: Chelicerata
- Class: Arachnida
- Order: Araneae
- Infraorder: Araneomorphae
- Family: Lycosidae
- Genus: Anoteropsis
- Species: A. hallae

Binomial name
- Anoteropsis hallae Vink, 2002

Species of spider

Anoteropsis hallae is a species of wolf spider that is endemic to New Zealand.

== Taxonomy ==
This species was described in 2002 by Cor Vink from male and female specimens. The holotype is stored in the New Zealand Arthropod Collection. The species name refers to Grace Hall, the collector of the type specimen.

== Description ==
The male is recorded at 5.4mm in length whereas the female is 5.2mm. The carapace is coloured brown and has yellow brown bands and blackish lines dorsally. The legs are orange brown with dark brown bands. The abdomen is brown with a yellow stripe. It is best distinguished from other Anoteropsis by the structure of its male and female genitalia.

== Distribution ==
This species is only known from the north west section of New Zealand's South Island. It is apparently restricted to forests.

== Conservation status ==
Under the New Zealand Threat Classification System, this species is listed as "Data Deficient" with the qualifiers of "Data Poor: Size" and "Data Poor: Trend".
