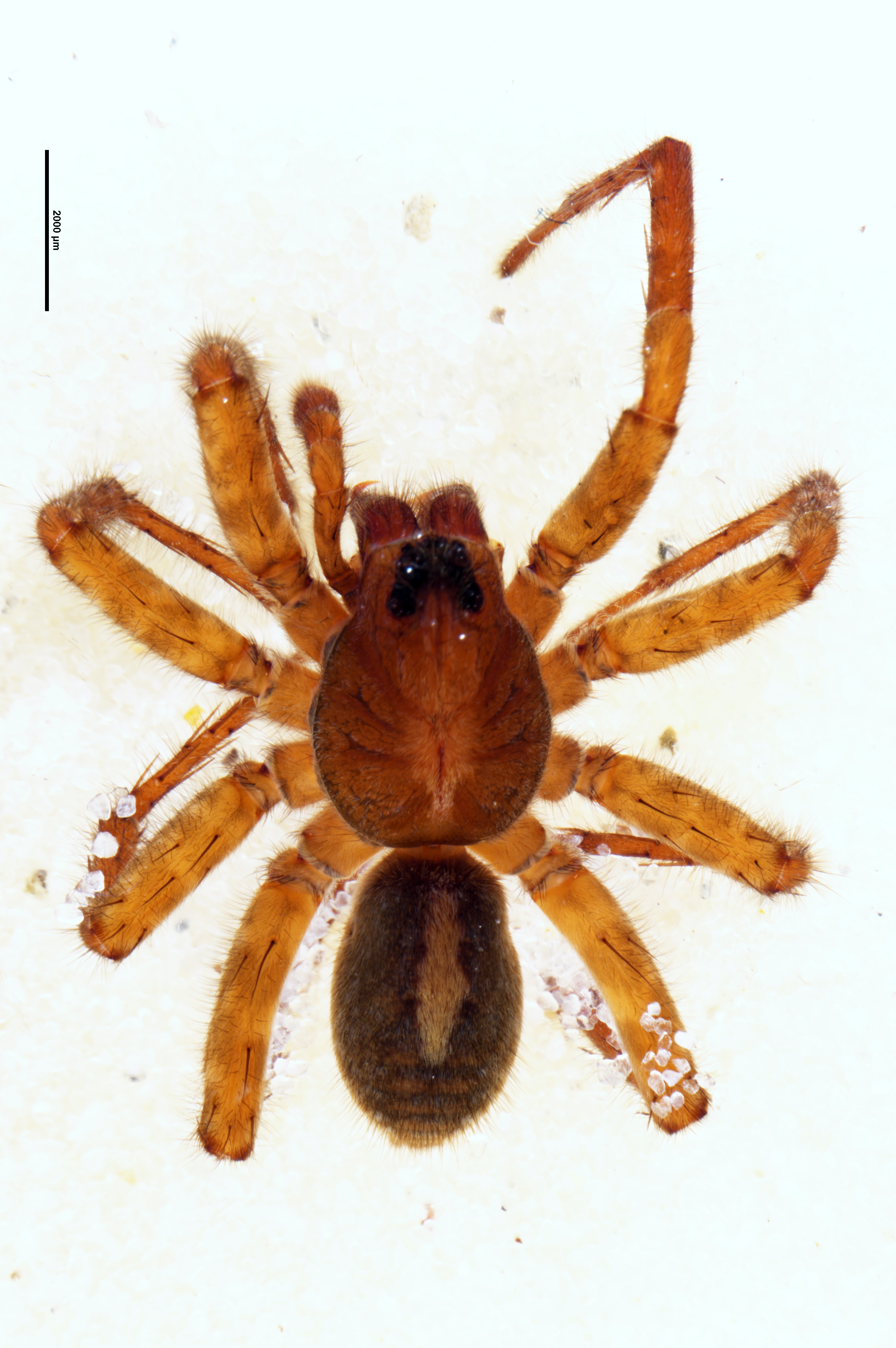
- Dorsal view of male holotype

Conservation status
- Not Threatened (NZ TCS)

Scientific classification
- Kingdom: Animalia
- Phylum: Arthropoda
- Subphylum: Chelicerata
- Class: Arachnida
- Order: Araneae
- Infraorder: Araneomorphae
- Family: Lycosidae
- Genus: Anoteropsis
- Species: A. cantuaria

Binomial name
- Anoteropsis cantuaria Vink, 2002

= Anoteropsis cantuaria =

Species of spider

Anoteropsis cantuaria is a species of wolf spider that is endemic to the Canterbury Plains of New Zealand.

== Taxonomy ==
Anoteropsis cantuaria was described by arachnologist Cor Vink in 2002. He named the species cantuaria after the New Zealand province of Canterbury, the only place it occurs. The male and female holotype and allotype were collected by Vink in Prices Valley, Banks Peninsula in 1994 and 1990 respectively, and in the Lincoln University Entomology Research Collection (LUNZ). Other paratype specimens collected by Vink and John Early were lodged in LUNZ and the New Zealand Arthropod Collection.

== Description ==
A. cantuaria males have bodies 7–10 mm long, females 8–11.5. Their body is orange-brown, with a black brown abdomen bearing a faint stripe. Legs are yellow brown with faint rings.

A. cantuaria is similar to A. lacustris, but lighter in colour. Males can be distinguished from other New Zealand wolf spiders by the shape of the median apophysis on the palpal bulbs – the apophysis on the bulb of A. cantuaria has a slightly more rounded bend than A. lacustris. Females can be distinguished by the shape of the sclerites of the epigyne, which have backward-pointing hoods.

== Habitat and distribution ==
A. cantuaria is only found in Canterbury, New Zealand, and lives amongst the rocks and stones of riverbeds, especially the shallow braided rivers that are characteristic of the Canterbury Plains. Specimens have been collected from Waipara Gorge, Waihi Gorge, and the Ōpihi River.

== Life history ==
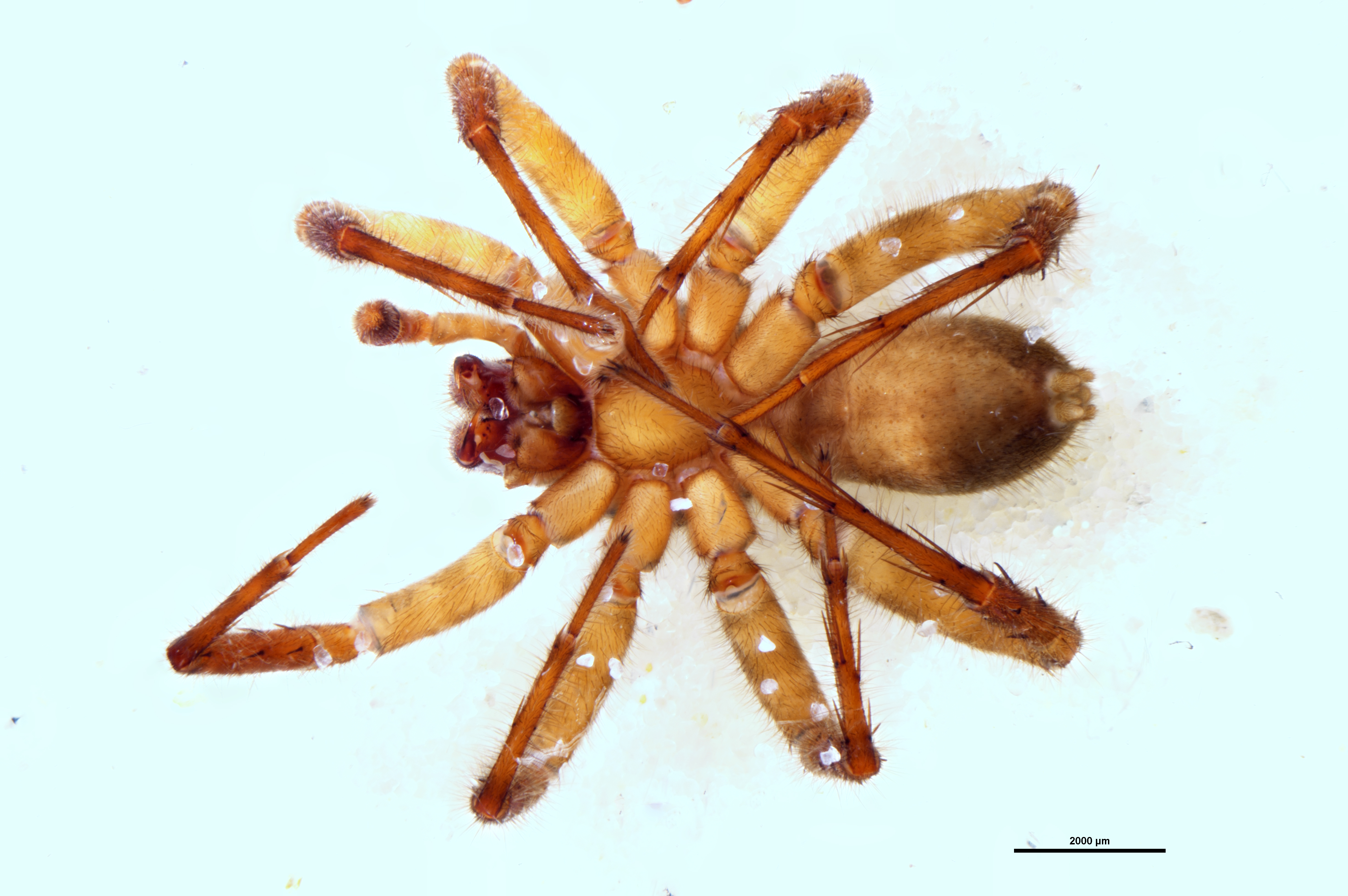
Ventral view of holotype

Adult spiders are found from spring to autumn (September to April). Eggs are laid in October, and a female carrying spiderlings in typical wolf spider fashion was found in mid-summer (January).

== Conservation status ==
Under the New Zealand Threat Classification System, this species is listed as "Not Threatened".
