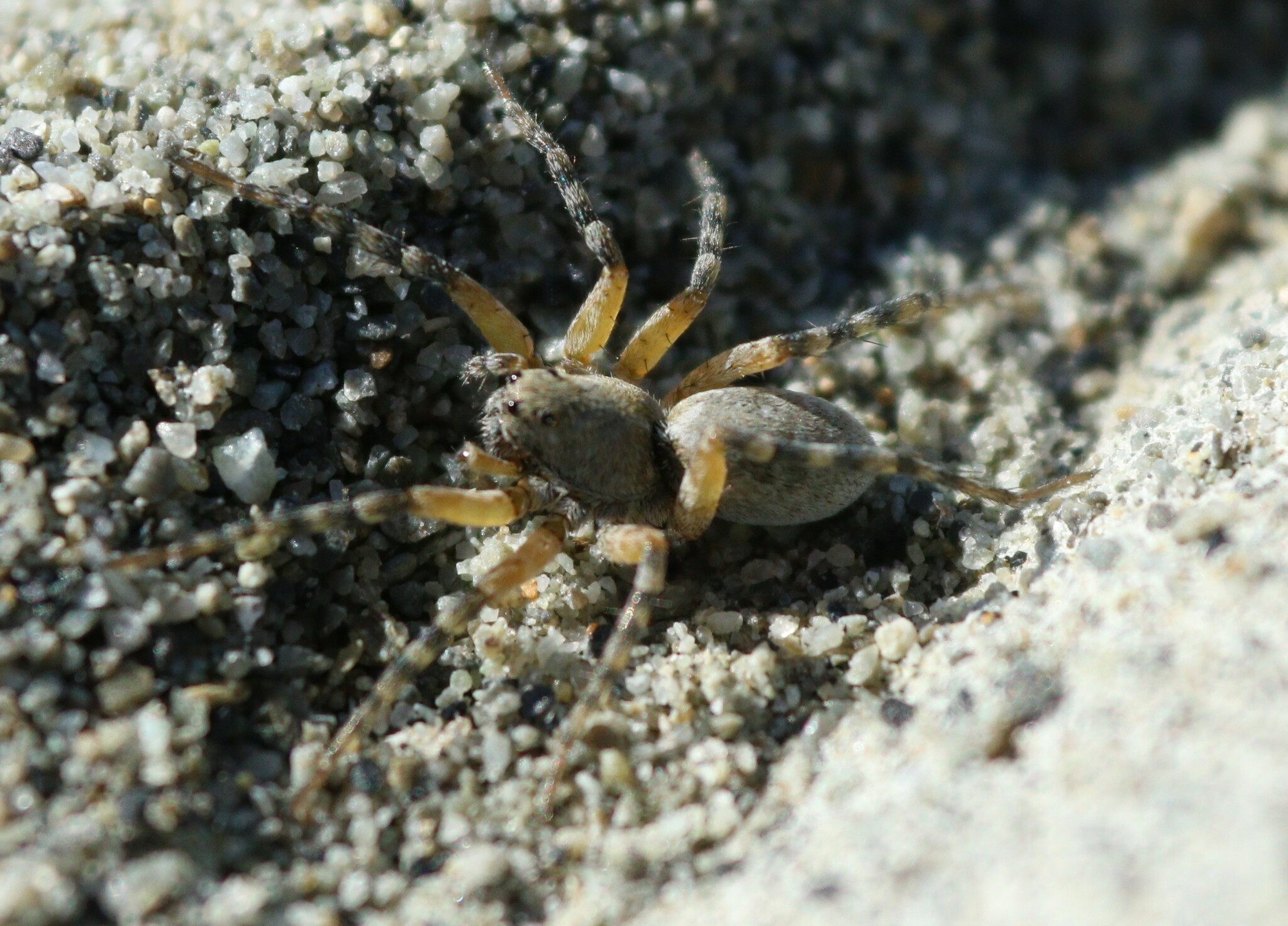

Conservation status
- Not Threatened (NZ TCS)

Scientific classification
- Kingdom: Animalia
- Phylum: Arthropoda
- Subphylum: Chelicerata
- Class: Arachnida
- Order: Araneae
- Infraorder: Araneomorphae
- Family: Lycosidae
- Genus: Anoteropsis
- Species: A. canescens

Binomial name
- Anoteropsis canescens (Goyen, 1887)

= Anoteropsis canescens =

Species of spider

Anoteropsis canescens is a species of Lycosidae spider that is endemic to New Zealand.

== Taxonomy ==
This species was described as Lycosa canescens by Peter Goyen in 1887. It was most recently revised in 2002. The syntypes are stored in Otago Museum.

== Description ==
The male is recorded at 5.6-7.8mm in length whereas the female is 7.1-10.3mm. The carapace is coloured brown and has blackish lines dorsally. The legs are yellow-brown to orange-brown and has brownish bands. The abdomen is grey with black blotches, a grey heart stripe and a pair of blotches posteriorly.

== Distribution/habitat ==
This species is found in the South Island of New Zealand. It typically occurs in dry grasslands, scrub and riverbeds. The adults have been observed from August to May.

== Conservation status ==
Under the New Zealand Threat Classification System, this species is listed as "Not Threatened".
