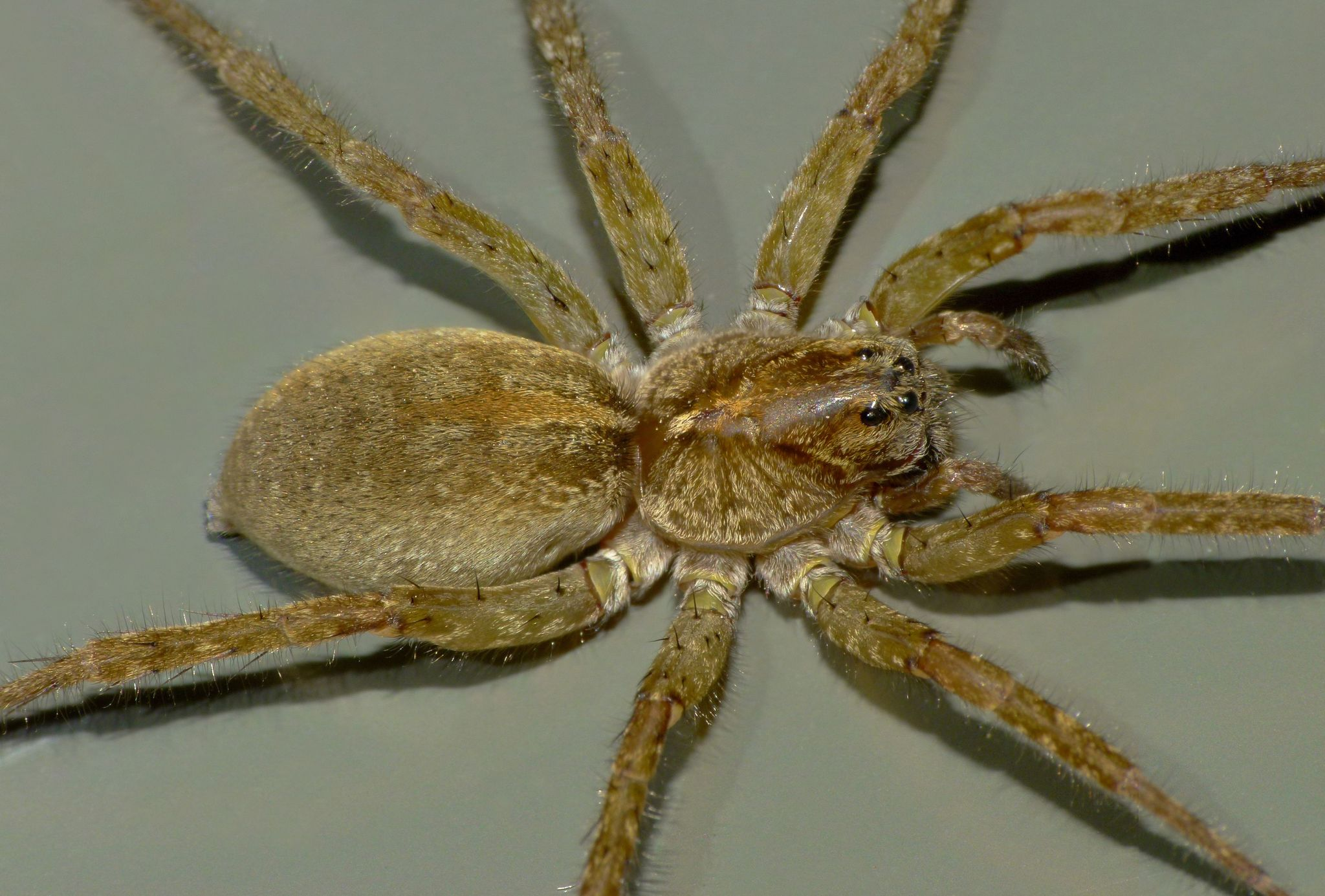

Conservation status
- Not Threatened (NZ TCS)

Scientific classification
- Kingdom: Animalia
- Phylum: Arthropoda
- Subphylum: Chelicerata
- Class: Arachnida
- Order: Araneae
- Infraorder: Araneomorphae
- Family: Lycosidae
- Genus: Anoteropsis
- Species: A. senica

Binomial name
- Anoteropsis senica (L. Koch, 1877)

Synonyms
- Lycosa senica; Lycosa uliginosa; Lycosa goyeni; Pardosa goyeni; Hogna senica

= Anoteropsis senica =

Species of spider

Anoteropsis senica is a species of Lycosidae spider that is endemic to New Zealand.

== Taxonomy ==
This species was first described as Lycosa senica by Ludwig Carl Christian Koch in 1877. It was most recently revised in 2002.

== Description ==
The male is recorded at 7.4-11.7mm in length whereas the female is 8.2-15.8mm. The carapace is coloured orange brown and has blackish markings that originate from the fovea. The legs are orange brown with faint dark bands. The abdomen is dark grey, has light yellow blotches dorsally and a yellow orange heart stripe that is more dull in females.

== Distribution/habitat ==
It is widespread throughout New Zealand south of 37°S, including on Stewart Island. They occur on alluvial river beds and hunt at night. The adults occur all year round but are most common December to January.

== Conservation status ==
Under the New Zealand Threat Classification System, this species is listed as "Not Threatened".
