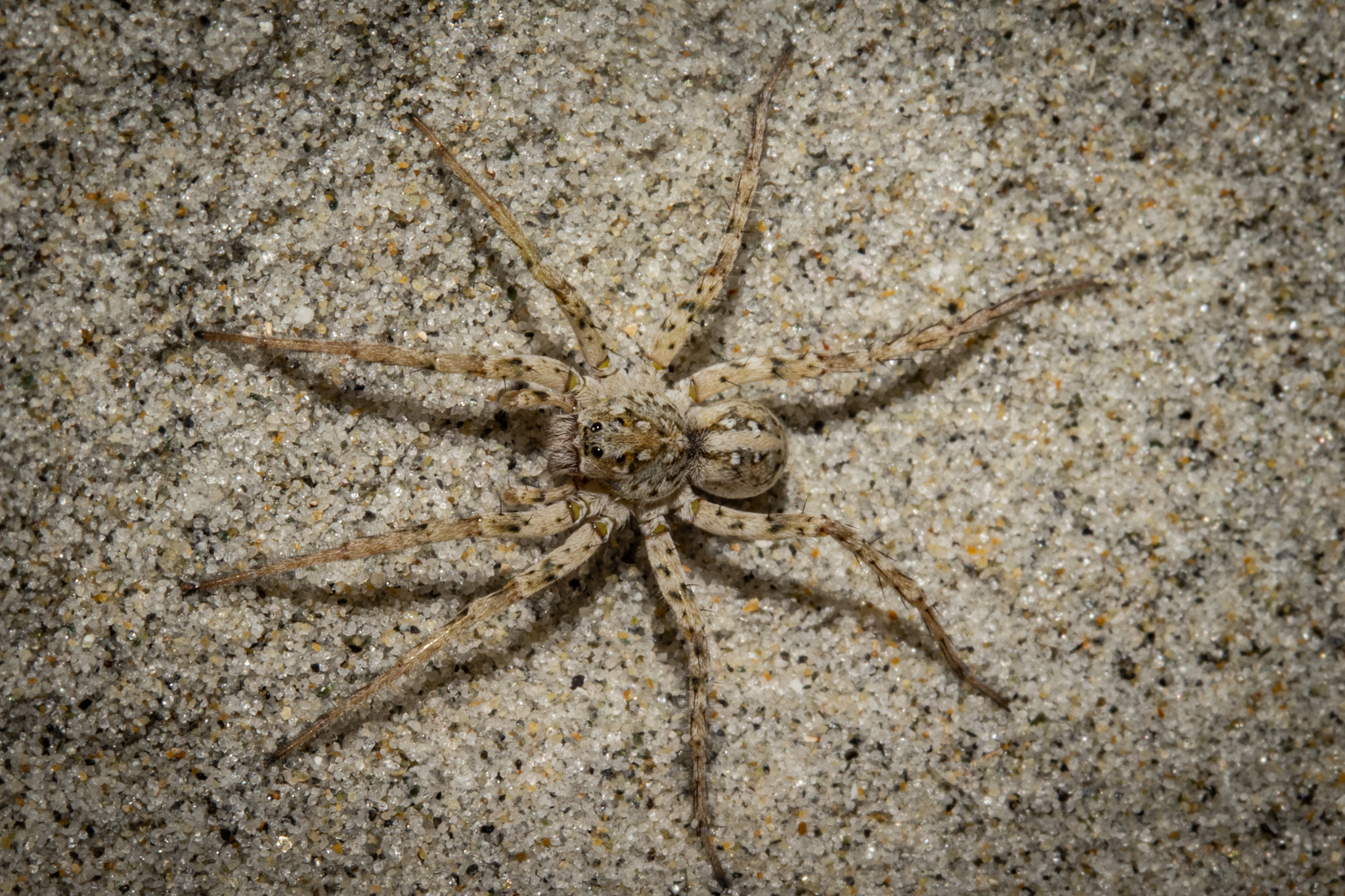

Conservation status
- Naturally Uncommon (NZ TCS)

Scientific classification
- Kingdom: Animalia
- Phylum: Arthropoda
- Subphylum: Chelicerata
- Class: Arachnida
- Order: Araneae
- Infraorder: Araneomorphae
- Family: Lycosidae
- Genus: Anoteropsis
- Species: A. forsteri

Binomial name
- Anoteropsis forsteri Vink, 2002

= Anoteropsis forsteri =

Species of spider

Anoteropsis forsteri is a species of wolf spider that is endemic to New Zealand.

== Etymology ==
The species is named after the arachnologist Raymond Forster, who mentored the describer of this species.

== Taxonomy ==
This species was described in 2002 by Cor Vink from male and female specimens.

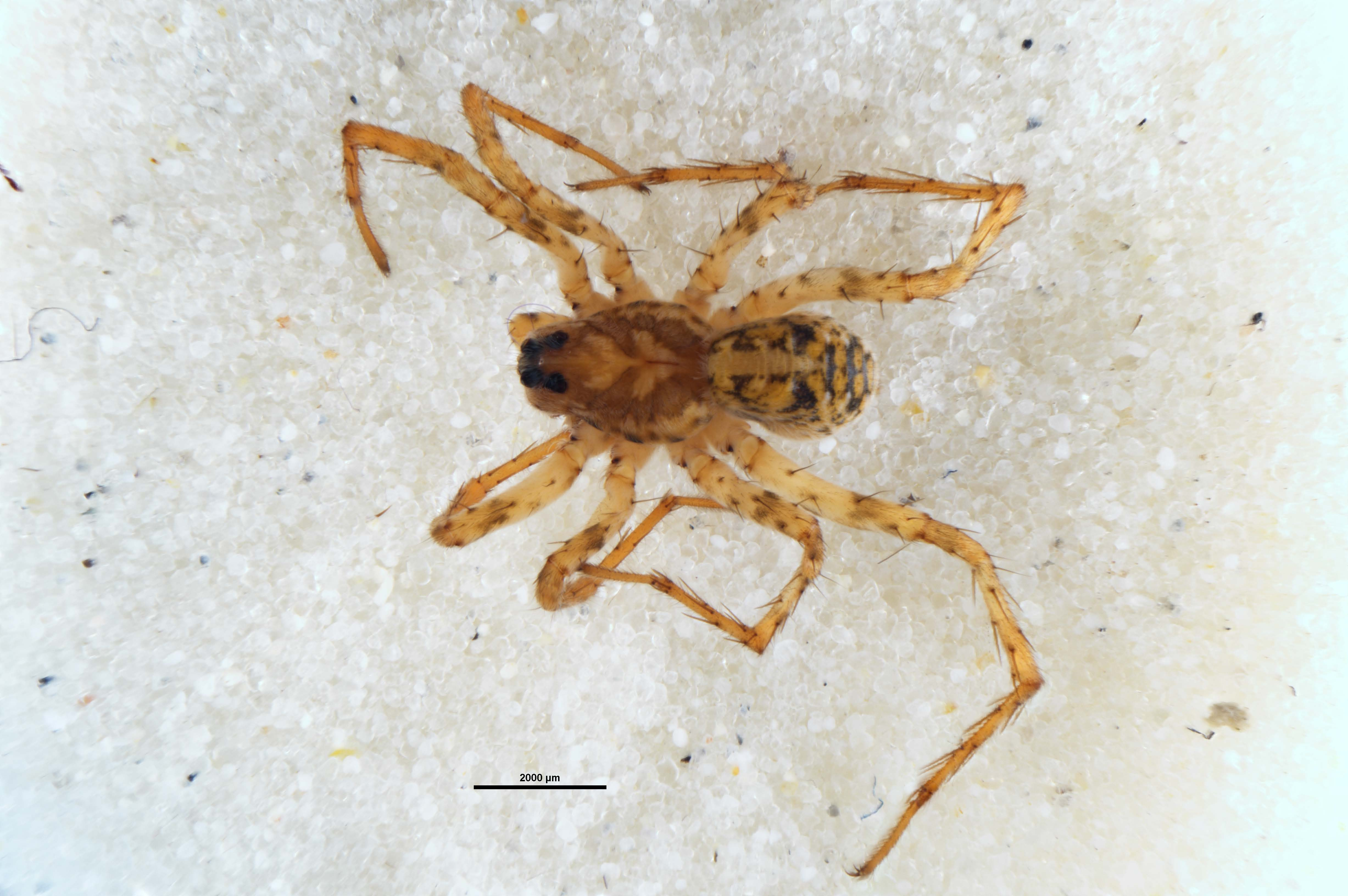
Holotype of Anoteropsis forsteri.

== Description ==
Anoteropsis forsteri is very similar to A. litoralis which occupies similar habitat, but can be distinguished by morphological features of their reproductive organs.

== Habitat and distribution ==
Anoteropsis forsteri occupies sand dunes and beaches, where their colouration allows them to camouflage into the background very easily. They can be found in these habitats south of 44°S in New Zealand (Many habitats to the north are typically occupied by A. litoralis, a similar species).

== Conservation status ==
Under the New Zealand Threat Classification System, this species is listed as "Naturally Uncommon" with the qualifier of "Range Restricted".
