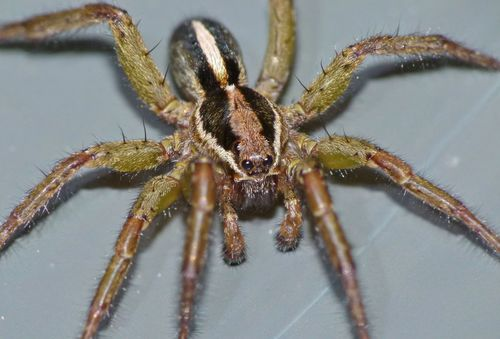
- Anoteropsis hilaris

Scientific classification
- Kingdom: Animalia
- Phylum: Arthropoda
- Subphylum: Chelicerata
- Class: Arachnida
- Order: Araneae
- Infraorder: Araneomorphae
- Family: Lycosidae
- Subfamily: Artoriinae
- Genus: Anoteropsis; L. Koch, 1878

Species
- See text.

Diversity
- 22 species

= Anoteropsis =

Genus of spiders

Anoteropsis is a genus of wolf spiders. All the species except one are found in New Zealand and its islands.

Their body size ranges from 4.2 to 17.4 mm.

== Species ==
As of September 2018, the World Spider Catalog accepted the following extant species:

- Anoteropsis adumbrata (Urquhart, 1887) – New Zealand (mainland, Stewart Is.)
- Anoteropsis aerescens (Goyen, 1887) – New Zealand
- Anoteropsis alpina Vink, 2002 – New Zealand
- Anoteropsis arenivaga (Dalmas, 1917) – New Zealand
- Anoteropsis blesti Vink, 2002 – New Zealand
- Anoteropsis canescens (Goyen, 1887) – New Zealand
- Anoteropsis cantuaria Vink, 2002 – New Zealand
- Anoteropsis flavescens L. Koch, 1878 (type species) – New Zealand
- Anoteropsis forsteri Vink, 2002 – New Zealand (mainland, Stewart Is.)
- Anoteropsis hallae Vink, 2002 – New Zealand
- Anoteropsis hilaris (L. Koch, 1877) – New Zealand (mainland, Stewart Is., Auckland Is.)
- Anoteropsis insularis Vink, 2002 – New Zealand (Chatham Is., Pitt Is.)
- Anoteropsis lacustris Vink, 2002 – New Zealand
- Anoteropsis litoralis Vink, 2002 – New Zealand
- Anoteropsis montana Vink, 2002 – New Zealand
- Anoteropsis okatainae Vink, 2002 – New Zealand
- Anoteropsis papuana Thorell, 1881 – New Guinea
- Anoteropsis ralphi (Simon, 1905) – New Zealand (Chatham Is.)
- Anoteropsis senica (L. Koch, 1877) – New Zealand (mainland, Stewart Is.)
- Anoteropsis urquharti (Simon, 1898) – New Zealand
- Anoteropsis virgata (Karsch, 1880) – Polynesia
- Anoteropsis westlandica Vink, 2002 – New Zealand

== Distribution ==
Anoteropsis is known mainly from New Zealand including the Chatham Islands, Snares Islands and Auckland Islands. New Zealand has 27 species of wolf spiders in 6 genera. The genus Anoteropsis dominates the country with 21 species alone. One species, Anoteropsis virgata, is native to Polynesia but is thought to be incorrectly placed in this genus.
