= Anoteropsis adumbrata =

Conservation status
- Not Threatened (NZ TCS)

Scientific classification
- Kingdom: Animalia
- Phylum: Arthropoda
- Subphylum: Chelicerata
- Class: Arachnida
- Order: Araneae
- Infraorder: Araneomorphae
- Family: Lycosidae
- Genus: Anoteropsis
- Species: A. adumbrata

Binomial name
- Anoteropsis adumbrata (Urquhart, 1887)

Synonyms
- Lycosa adumbrata; Pardosa adumbrata

Species of spider

Anoteropsis adumbrata is a species of Lycosidae spider that is endemic to New Zealand.

== Taxonomy ==
This species was described as Lycosa adumbrata in 1887 by Arthur Urquhart from a female specimen. It was most recently revised in 2002, in which the male was described. The holotype is stored in Canterbury Museum.

== Description ==
The male is recorded at 5.6-8.2mm in length whereas the female is 4.9-10.4mm. The carapace is coloured orange brown with yellow brown markings dorsally. The legs are yellow brown with dark markings. The abdomen colouration varies, but usually is usually grey brown with a yellow stripe dorsally. It is best distinguished from other Anoteropsis by the shape of its genitalia.

== Distribution and habitat ==
This species is widespread throughout New Zealand. It typically occurs in high altitude grasslands and scrub.

== Conservation status ==
Under the New Zealand Threat Classification System, this species is listed as "Not Threatened".
