= Anoteropsis urquharti =

Conservation status
- Not Threatened (NZ TCS)

Scientific classification
- Kingdom: Animalia
- Phylum: Arthropoda
- Subphylum: Chelicerata
- Class: Arachnida
- Order: Araneae
- Infraorder: Araneomorphae
- Family: Lycosidae
- Genus: Anoteropsis
- Species: A. urquharti

Binomial name
- Anoteropsis urquharti (Simon, 1898)

Synonyms
- Lycosa urquharti; Hogna urquharti

Species of spider

Anoteropsis urquharti is a species of wolf spider that is endemic to New Zealand.

== Taxonomy ==
This species was described as Lycosa urquharti in 1898 by Eugène Simon. It was most recently revised in 2002 from male and female specimens. The holotype is presumed lost.

== Description ==
The male is recorded at 5.8-8.4mm in length whereas the female is 6.9-9.5mm. The carapace is coloured black to brown, has blackish lines originating from the fovea, white hairs beneath the posterior lateral eyes and with an orange brown area in the middle. The legs are yellow brown with blackish bands. The abdomen is grey with blackish blotches, a yellowish grey heart stripe and yellow brown patches posteriorly. It is best distinguished from other Anoteropsis by the structure of the male and female genitalia and by the presence of a white patch of hairs below the posterior lateral eyes.

== Distribution and habitat ==
This species is only known from mountainous regions south of 43°S in the South Island of New Zealand. They occur on stony grounds and screes. Adults occur from September to April.

== Conservation status ==
Under the New Zealand Threat Classification System, this species is listed as "Not Threatened".
