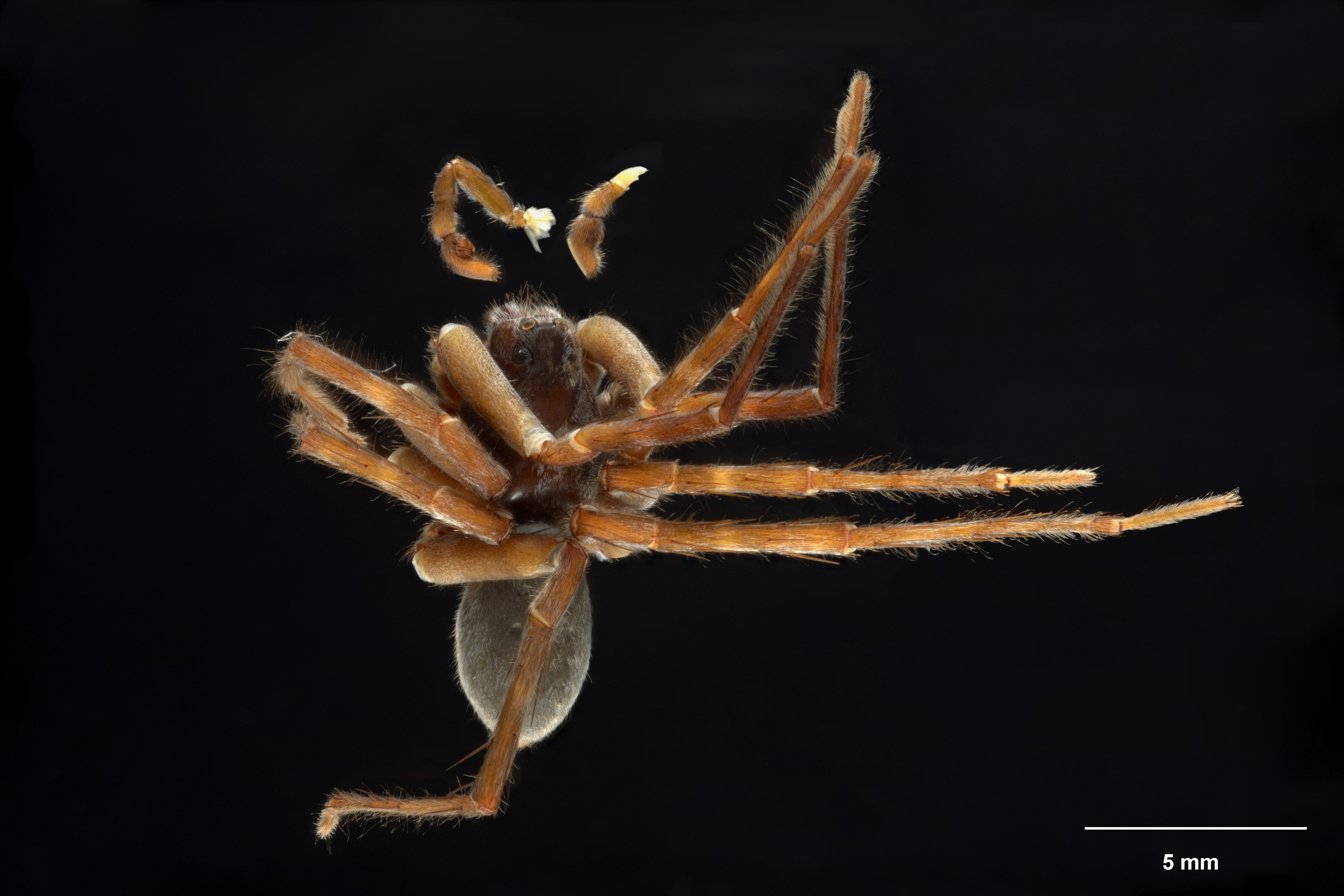
- Holotype specimen

Conservation status
- Not Threatened (NZ TCS)

Scientific classification
- Kingdom: Animalia
- Phylum: Arthropoda
- Subphylum: Chelicerata
- Class: Arachnida
- Order: Araneae
- Infraorder: Araneomorphae
- Family: Lycosidae
- Genus: Anoteropsis
- Species: A. montana

Binomial name
- Anoteropsis montana Vink, 2002

= Anoteropsis montana =

Species of spider

Anoteropsis montana is a species of wolf spider that is endemic to New Zealand. It was first formally named in 2002.

== Taxonomy ==
This species was described in 2002 by Cor Vink from male and female specimens. The holotype is stored in Te Papa Museum under registration number AS.000874.

== Description ==
The male is recorded at 9.1-11.5mm in length whereas the female is 10.3-15.9mm. The carapace is coloured brown with blackish markings originating from the fovea and black along the margins. The legs are dark orange brown with dark bands. The abdomen is dark grey. It is best distinguished from other Anoteropsis by differences in the male and female genitalia.

== Distribution and habitat ==
This species is only known from the northern half of New Zealand's South Island. It occurs on scree and rocky riverbeds in mountainous areas. Adults occur from October to May.

== Conservation status ==
Under the New Zealand Threat Classification System, this species is listed as "Not Threatened".
