= Anoteropsis alpina =

Conservation status
- Not Threatened (NZ TCS)

Scientific classification
- Kingdom: Animalia
- Phylum: Arthropoda
- Subphylum: Chelicerata
- Class: Arachnida
- Order: Araneae
- Infraorder: Araneomorphae
- Family: Lycosidae
- Genus: Anoteropsis
- Species: A. alpina

Binomial name
- Anoteropsis alpina Vink, 2002

Species of spider

Anoteropsis alpina is a species of Lycosidae that is endemic to New Zealand.

== Taxonomy ==
This species was described in 2002 by Cor Vink from male and female specimens. The holotype is stored in Otago Museum.

== Description ==
The male is recorded at 11.0 - 15.1mm in length whereas the female is 14.3 - 17.4mm. The carapace is dark brown with a reddish tint. The abdomen is grey brown to brown.

== Distribution and habitat ==
This species is only known from alpine habitat in the South Island of New Zealand. It is typically associated with screen and rocky terrain.

== Conservation status ==
Under the New Zealand Threat Classification System, this species is listed as "Not Threatened" with the qualifiers of "Climate Impact" and "Data Poor: Trend".
