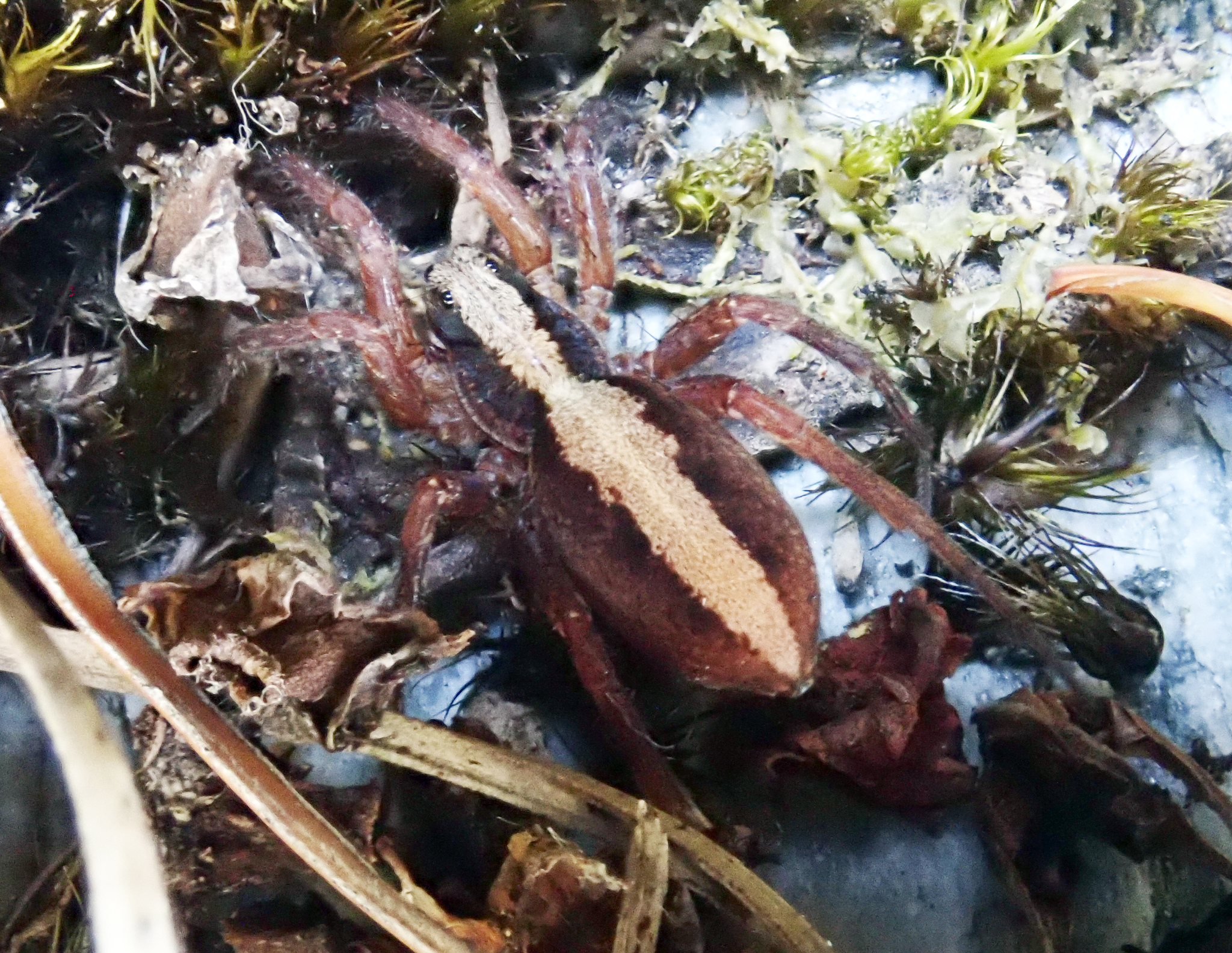

Conservation status
- Naturally Uncommon (NZ TCS)

Scientific classification
- Kingdom: Animalia
- Phylum: Arthropoda
- Subphylum: Chelicerata
- Class: Arachnida
- Order: Araneae
- Infraorder: Araneomorphae
- Family: Lycosidae
- Genus: Anoteropsis
- Species: A. ralphi

Binomial name
- Anoteropsis ralphi (Simon, 1905)

Synonyms
- Lycosa ralphi; Lycosa turbida; Lycosa retiruga; Lycosa algida; Allocosa retiruga; Alopecosa ralphi; Dingosa turbida

= Anoteropsis ralphi =

Species of spider

Anoteropsis ralphi is a species of Lycosidae spider that is endemic to New Zealand.

== Taxonomy ==
This species was described as Lycosa ralphi by Eugène Simon in 1905. It was most recently revised in 2002. The type specimens of Lycosa ralphi are presumed lost.

== Description ==
The male is recorded at 5.5-7.6mm in length whereas the female is 6.1-9.8mm. The carapace is coloured orange brown with a yellowish longitudinal band, blackish lines originating from the fovea and brown along the carapace margins. The legs are orange brown with darkish bands. The abdomen is brown with a yellowish-brown heart tripe dorsally of variable size.

== Distribution ==
This species is only known from the Chatham Islands, New Zealand.

== Conservation status ==
Under the New Zealand Threat Classification System, this species is listed as "Naturally Uncommon" with the qualifier of "Island Endemic" and "Range Restricted".
