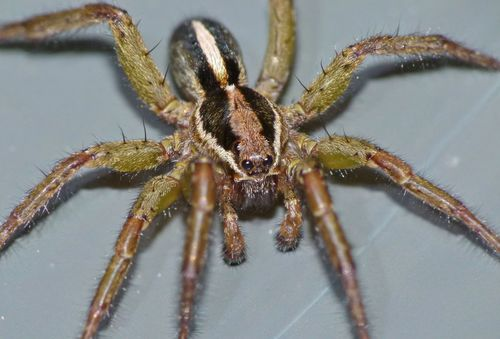

Scientific classification
- Kingdom: Animalia
- Phylum: Arthropoda
- Subphylum: Chelicerata
- Class: Arachnida
- Order: Araneae
- Infraorder: Araneomorphae
- Family: Lycosidae
- Genus: Anoteropsis
- Species: A. hilaris

Binomial name
- Anoteropsis hilaris (Koch, 1877)

Synonyms
- Lycosa hilaris Koch, 1877; Lycosa umbrata Koch, 1877; Pardosa vicaria Koch, 1877; Lycosa virgata Goyen, 1887; Lycosa taylori Goyen, 1887; Lycosa tremula Simon, 1899; Lycoa virgatella Roewer, 1951; Pardosa taylori Roewer, 1955; Pardosa virgatella Roewer, 1955; Arctosa tremula Roewer, 1955; Avicosa umbrata Roewer, 1955; Arctosella tremula Roewer, 1960; Lycosa subantarctica Forster, 1964

= Anoteropsis hilaris =

Species of spider

Anoteropsis hilaris, commonly referred as the garden wolf spider or the grey wolf spider, is a species of wolf spider that is endemic to New Zealand.

== Taxonomy and description ==
Anoteropsis hilaris was first described three times in 1877 by Ludwig Koch in the same paper as Lycosa hilaris, Lycosa umbrata and Pardosa vicaria. In the same year, Peter Goyen described Lycosa virgata and Lycosa taylori. In 1899, Eugene Simon described Lycosa tremula. In 1951, Carl Roewer renamed L. virgata as Lycosa virgatella. In 1955, Roewer would transfer L virgatella and L. taylori to the Pardosa genus, L. tremula to the Arctosa genus and transfer L. umbrata to the Avicosa genus. In 1960, Roewer would transfer A. tremula to the Arctosella genus. In 1964, Ray Forster described Lycosa subantarctica. In 2002, Cor Vink placed Lycosa hilaris in the Anoteropsis genus and recognized all aforementioned names as synonyms of A. hilaris.

== Description ==
Anoteropsis hilaris is small with a body length of 4.9-11mm (male) or 4.9-11.8mm (female). The main body has a pale yellow stripe on the dorsal side running from the front of the head to about two thirds down the abdomen. The abdomen and cephalothorax vary in colouration, but are typically brown with darker colours near the medial stripe. The legs are also variable but are typically yellow-brown, but may also have green segments.

The eggsacs have a pinkish tinge when first laid.

Anoteropsis hilaris can be distinguished from other species of Anoteropsis by the morphology of its reproductive system.

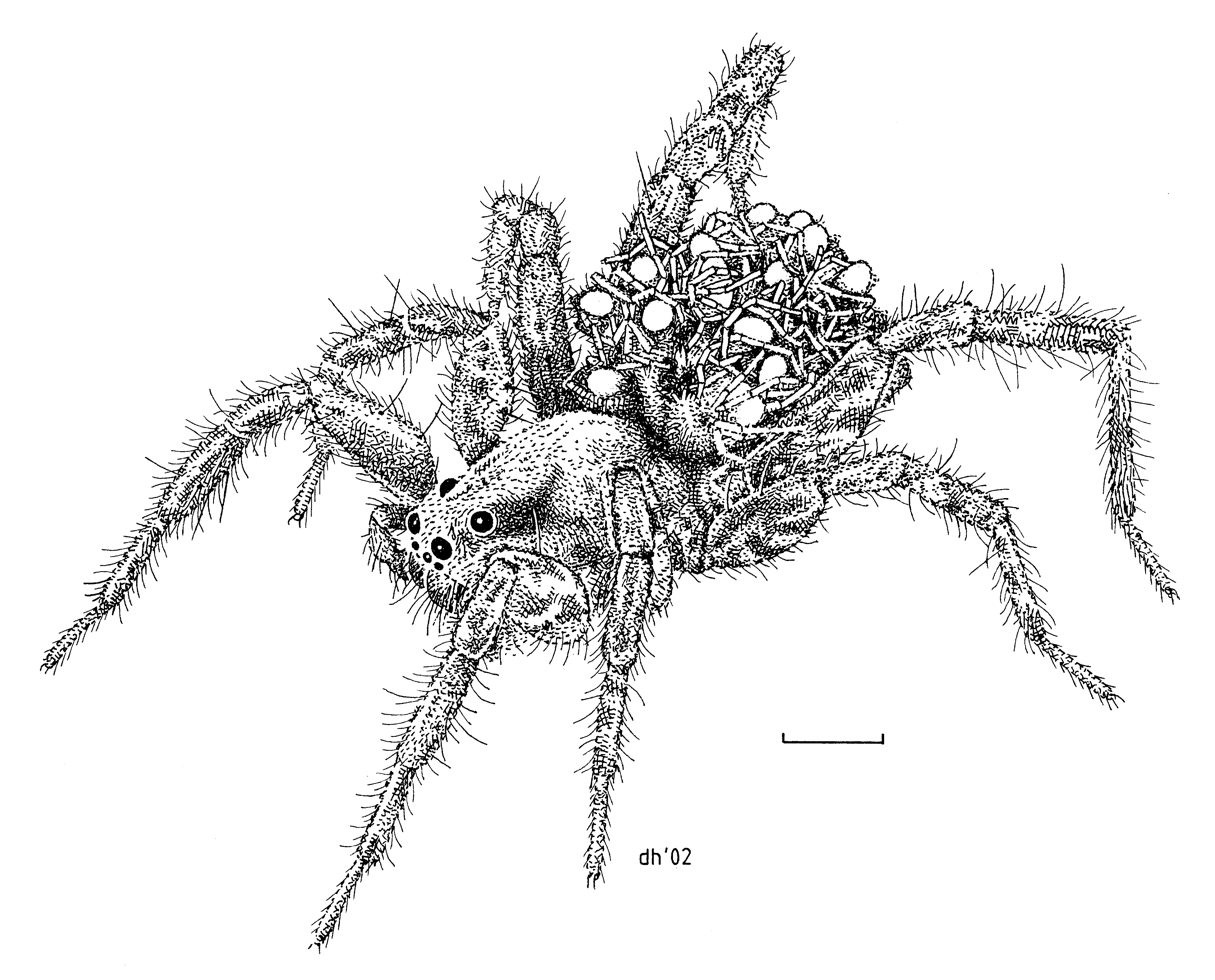
Female Anoteropsis hilaris carrying its offspring

== Distribution and habitat ==
Anoteropsis hilaris is widespread throughout both main islands of New Zealand and on some of New Zealand's smaller islands such as Stewart Island, Three Kings Islands, Snares Island and Auckland Islands. The spider occurs in grassland scrub habitats everywhere except in alpine zones. A. hilaris is one of the most abundant predatory arthropods in New Zealand's agricultural ecosystems.

== Life history ==
Adults appear to have seasonal abundance, being most abundant from December to January (but can be found all year round). Egg sacs have been recorded from September to March, which are carried by the female. The female carries the spiderlings, which have been recorded from December to March.
