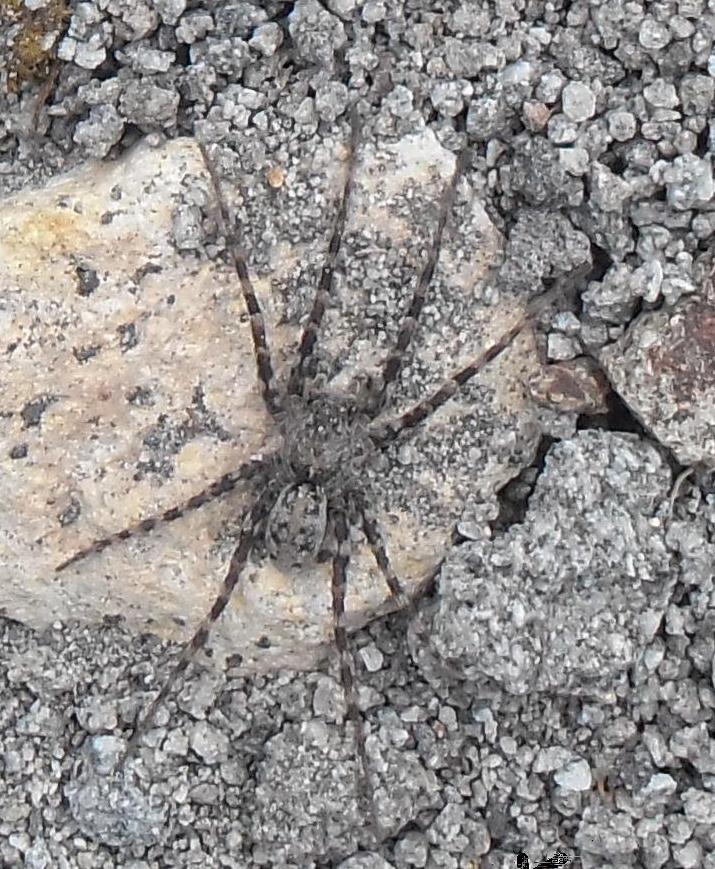

Conservation status
- Not Threatened (NZ TCS)

Scientific classification
- Kingdom: Animalia
- Phylum: Arthropoda
- Subphylum: Chelicerata
- Class: Arachnida
- Order: Araneae
- Infraorder: Araneomorphae
- Family: Lycosidae
- Genus: Anoteropsis
- Species: A. aerescens

Binomial name
- Anoteropsis aerescens (Goyen, 1887)

Synonyms
- Anoteropsis aerescens (Goyen, 1887); Artoriella maura (Urquhart, 1892); Dalmasicosa albovestita (Dalmas, 1917); Geolycosa albovestita (Dalmas, 1917); Lycosa aerescens Goyen, 1887; Lycosa albovestita Dalmas, 1917; Lycosa maura Urquhart, 1892, nomen dubium; Pardosa aerescens (Goyen, 1887)

= Anoteropsis aerescens =

Species of spider

Anoteropsis aerescens is a species of wolf spiders that is endemic to New Zealand.

== Taxonomy ==
This species was first described as Lycosa aerescens in 1887 by Peter Goyen from male and female specimens. It has undergone numerous redescriptions. The most recent redescription was in 2002. The species name aerescens is derived from Latin. Aeramen means bronze.

== Description ==
The male is recorded at 5.2-10.3mm in length whereas the female is 5.9-12.5mm.The carapace is coloured dark brown with whitish hairs. The legs are dark brown with yellow brown markings. The abdomen is grey with black and yellowish markings dorsally. It can be distinguished from all other Anoteropsis species by the shape of the median apophysis of the male bulb and the external sclerites of the female epigyne, especially the wide median septum.

== Distribution ==
This species is widespread throughout New Zealand.

== Conservation status ==
Under the New Zealand Threat Classification System, this species is listed as "Not Threatened".
