= Anoteropsis arenivaga =

Conservation status
- Naturally Uncommon (NZ TCS)

Scientific classification
- Kingdom: Animalia
- Phylum: Arthropoda
- Subphylum: Chelicerata
- Class: Arachnida
- Order: Araneae
- Infraorder: Araneomorphae
- Family: Lycosidae
- Genus: Anoteropsis
- Species: A. arenivaga

Binomial name
- Anoteropsis arenivaga (Dalmas, 1917)

Synonyms
- Lycosa arenaria; Lycosa arenivaga; Geolycosa arenivaga; Dalmasicosa arenivaga

Species of spider

Anoteropsis arenivaga is a species of Lycosidae spider that is endemic to New Zealand.

== Taxonomy ==
This species was first described as Lycosa arenaria by Arthur Urquhart in 1891. It was most recently revised in 2002. The syntype is presumed lost.

== Description ==
The male is recorded at 5.6-7.6mm in length whereas the female is 6.6-9.1mm. The carapace is coloured brown with whitish hairs. The legs are orange brown with dark bands. The abdomen is dark grey with grey markings dorsally. It is best distinguished from other Anoteropsis by differences in the male and female genitalia.

== Distribution/habitat ==
This species is only known from the South Island of New Zealand. It is apparently absent above 42°S. It typically occurs along river beds, lake edges and beaches. Adults are most often found during summer months.

== Conservation status ==
Under the New Zealand Threat Classification System, this species is listed as "Naturally Uncommon" with the qualifier of "Range Restricted".
