= Anoteropsis flavescens =

Conservation status
- Not Threatened (NZ TCS)

Scientific classification
- Kingdom: Animalia
- Phylum: Arthropoda
- Subphylum: Chelicerata
- Class: Arachnida
- Order: Araneae
- Infraorder: Araneomorphae
- Family: Lycosidae
- Genus: Anoteropsis
- Species: A. flavescens

Binomial name
- Anoteropsis flavescens L. Koch, 1878

Species of spider

Anoteropsis flavescens is a species of Lycosidae spider that is endemic to New Zealand.

== Taxonomy ==
This species was described by Ludwig Carl Christian Koch in 1878. It was most recently revised in 2002. It is the type species for the Anoteropsis genus. The holotype is presumed lost.

== Description ==
The male is recorded at 6.5-9.1mm in length whereas the female is 7.4-9.7mm. The carapace is coloured orange-brown, has two brownish bands, black lines originating from the fovea. The legs are orange-brown. The abdomen is orange-brown with a brown-yellow heart stripe and black bands dorsally.

== Distribution and habitat ==
This species is only known from the south east of New Zealand's South Island. It typically occurs in swamps and marshy grasslands. The adults occurs from September to May.

== Conservation status ==
Under the New Zealand Threat Classification System, this species is listed as "Not Threatened".
