= Lincoln University Entomology Research Collection =

Entomology collection in New Zealand

Coordinates: 43°38′35.49″S 172°28′10.63″E

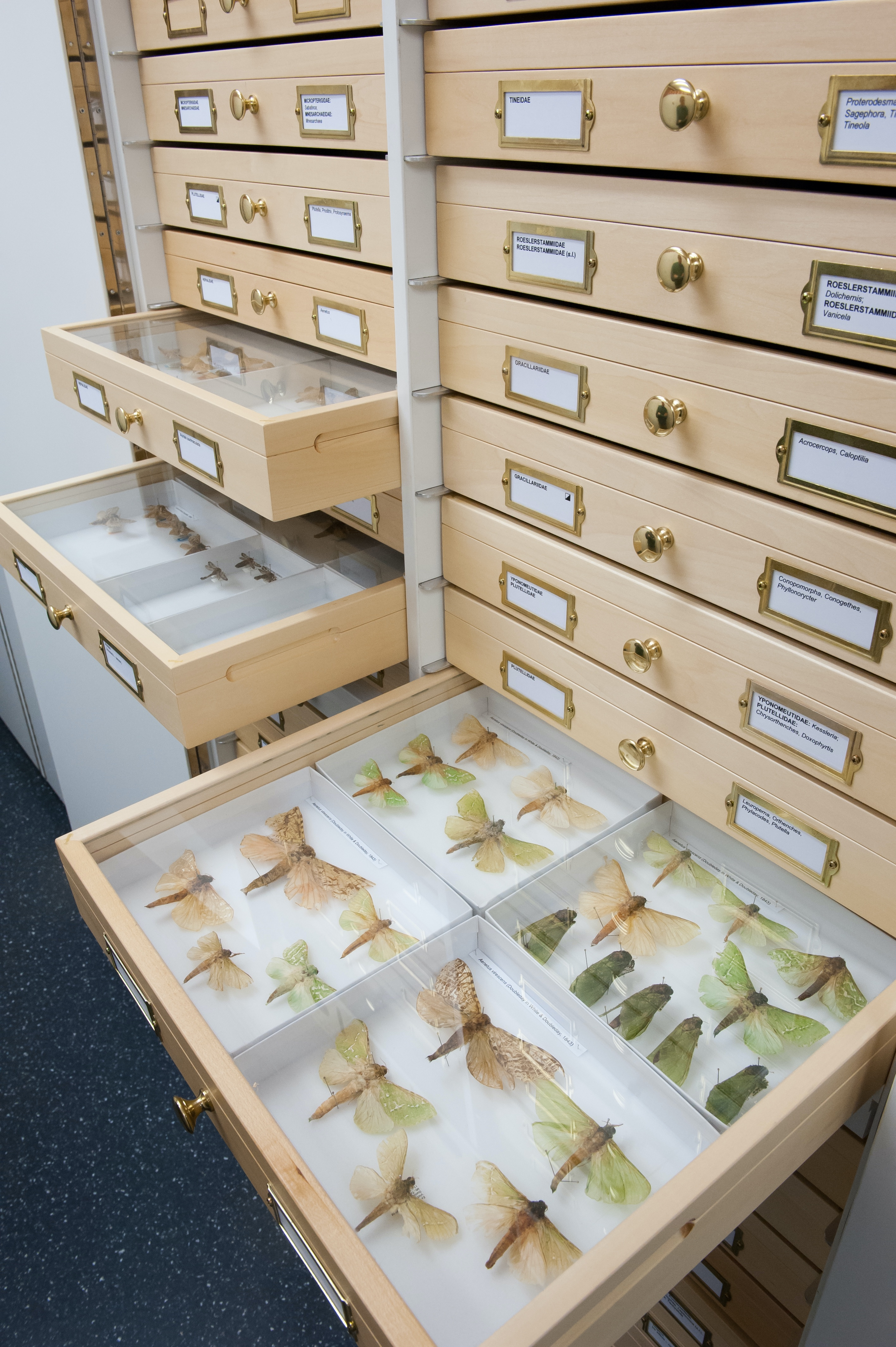
- Pūriri moths in the collection
- Housed at: Lincoln University
- Curators: John Marris
- Website: https://bioprotection.org.nz/Facilities/entomology-research-collection/

The Lincoln University Entomology Research Collection is a collection of approximately 500,000 insect, spider, and other arthropod specimens housed in Lincoln University, New Zealand. One of New Zealand's largest insect research collections, it is the only one based in a university.

== History ==
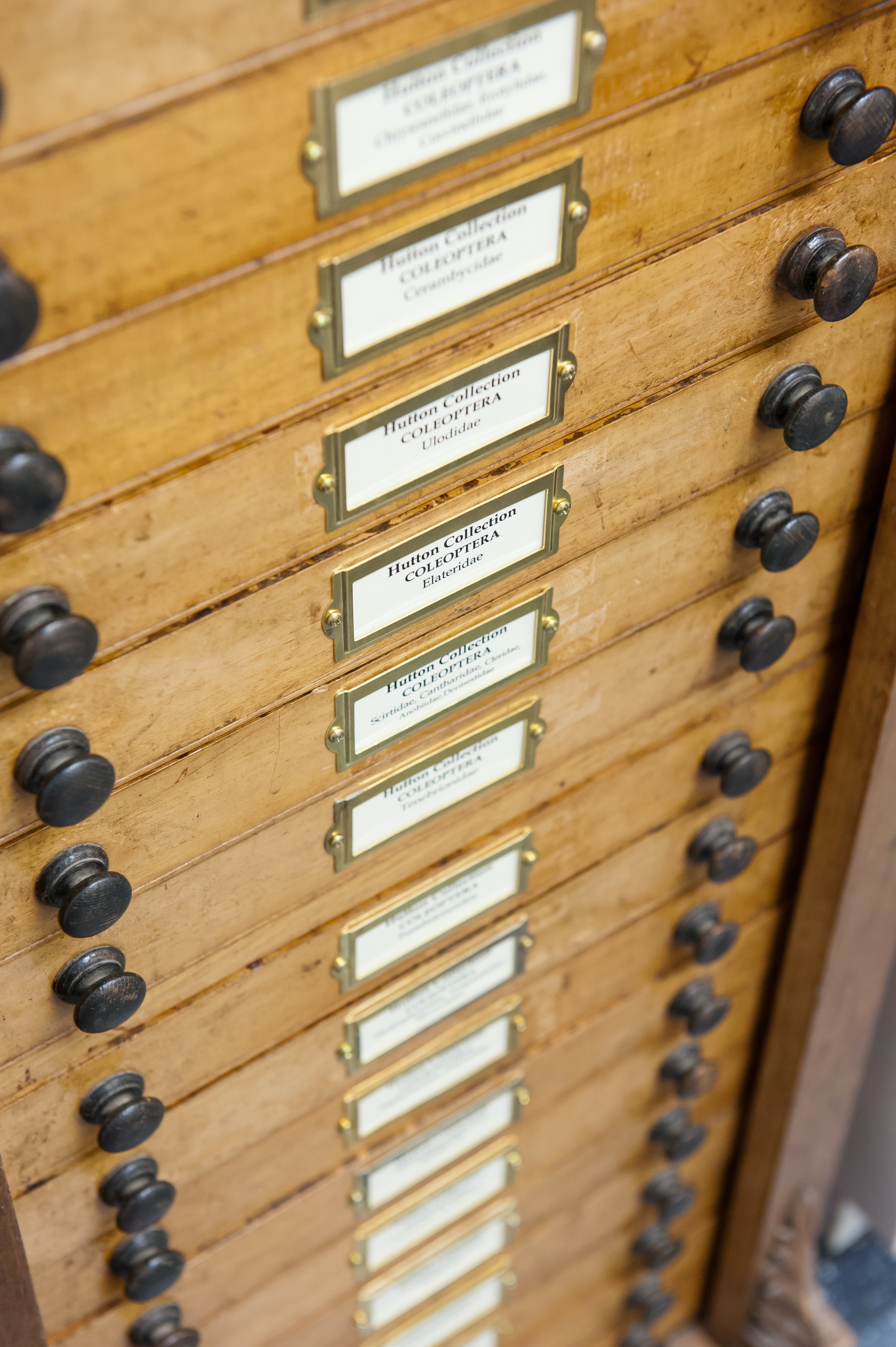
Original drawers containing the specimens donated by Frederick Hutton

The insect collection at Lincoln University, New Zealand can be traced back to the first days of its existence as the School of Agriculture, Canterbury University College. Upon its opening in 1880, William Ivey was the sole academic staff member, so visiting lecturers were common. In the first two years, natural science was taught by Frederick Hutton, at that time Professor of Biology at Canterbury College and later director of the Canterbury Museum, who had half his salary paid by the school. He presented an insect collection to the institution, some elements of which still remain including their original drawers; these formed the nucleus of the current research collections.

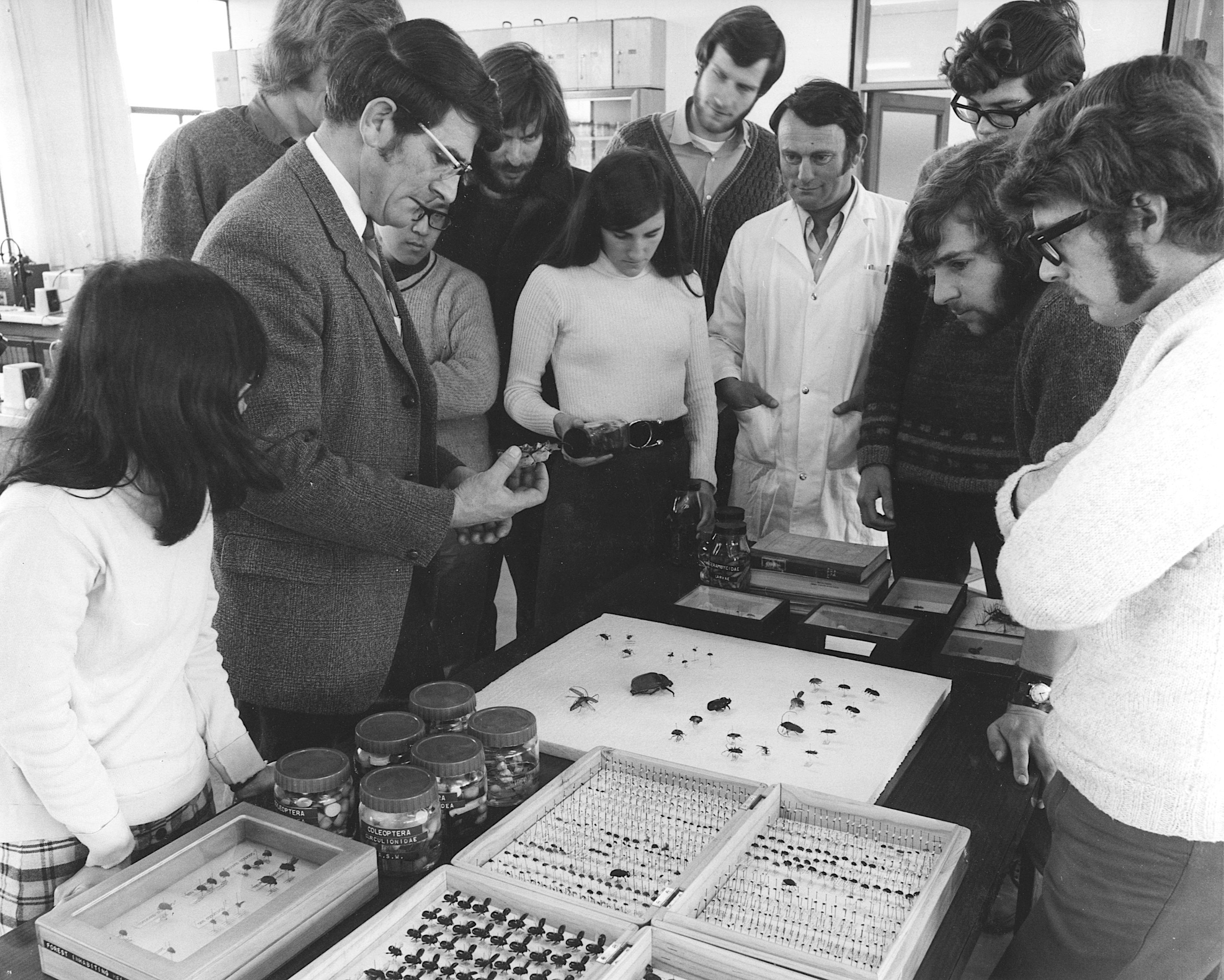
Peter Pottinger using the collection for teaching Coleoptera taxonomy in the early '70s.

The entomology collection initially consisted mostly of boxes of specimens used for teaching, and was supplemented through light-trapping on campus in the Orchard Car Park. It began to grow following the appointment of Roy Harrison as the university's first Professor of Entomology. Roy Harrison and fellow entomology lecturer Rowan Emberson were instrumental in acquiring specimens from the late 1960s onward. For years they led and took part in annual departmental summer field trips all over New Zealand; the first of these was a collecting trip to Mt Cook in 1969, followed by expeditions to the West Coast, Stewart Island, D'Urville Island, Fiordland, Central Otago, and many other locations, with a focus on areas that were entomologically poorly-known. From 1969 to 1991 there were 1–3 Departmental field trips every year, after which they became small-scale research-focussed events. Emberson and others also made substantial collections in their free time for the benefit of what was then known as the Entomology Research Museum.

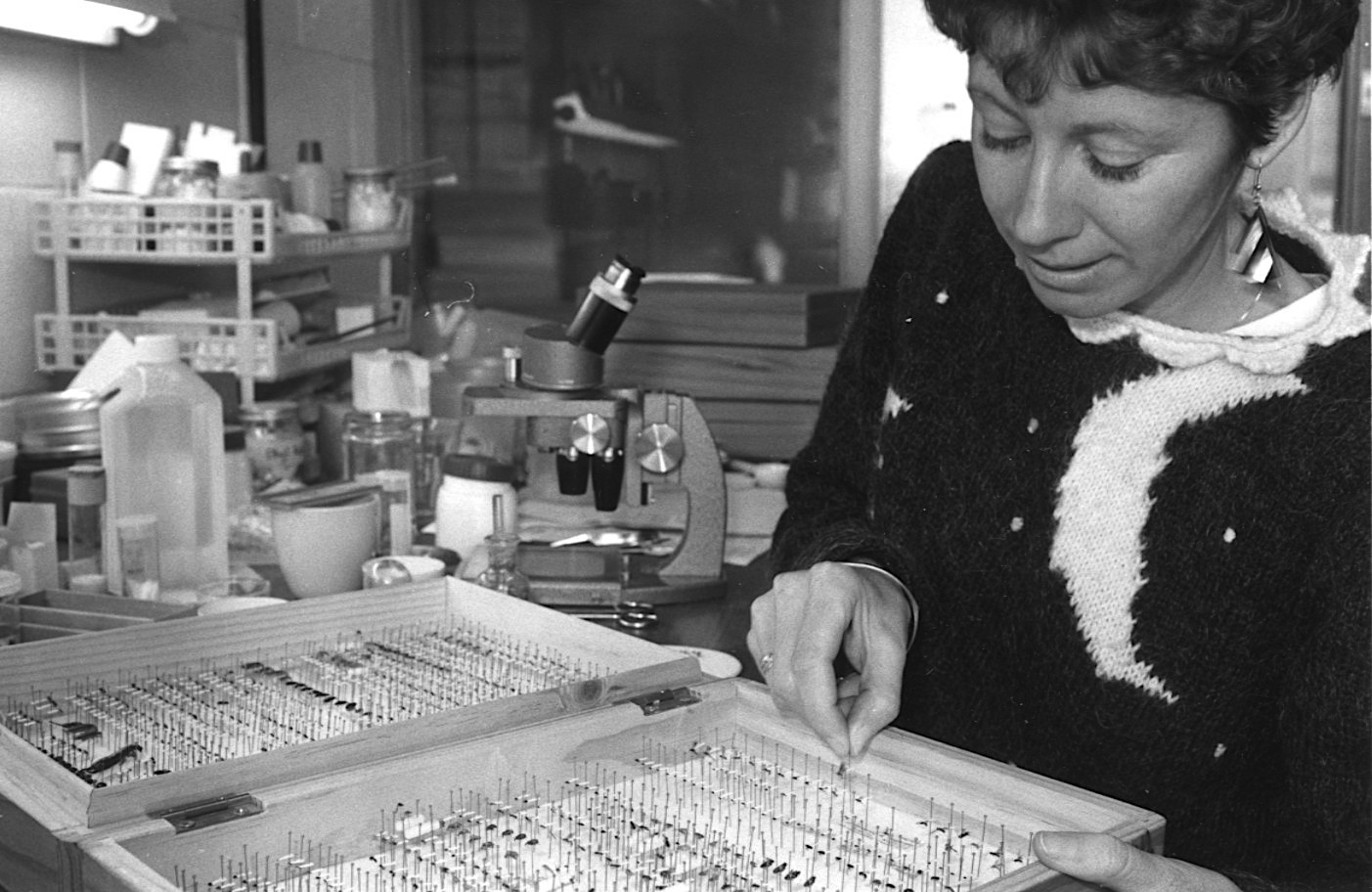
Carol Muir, curator of the then-Lincoln University Research Museum 1977–1990

The collection moved to the newly completed Hilgendorf Wing in 1968, and the newly-formed Department of Entomology under Professor Harrison had a room set aside for the Entomology Museum, under the care of technician Margaret McPherson. The department then moved to the Burns Wing in 1976; while under construction, an entire floor of the Burns building was reallocated to Wool Science, and the Entomology Museum layout had to be redesigned by Peter Pottinger in 24 hours to fit into the remaining fifth-floor space. In 1977 Carol Muir became the curator of the collection, with a special interest in Lepidoptera. After Muir's departure in 1990, John Marris took over as curator, and has continued in this role to the present day.

== Scope of collection ==
Initially known as the Lincoln University Research Museum, the collection's primary purpose was building class collections for student study, but as it grew from numerous collecting expeditions it became a substantial research and reference collection, and changed its name in the 2010s to reflect this. Its institutional acronym in the scientific literature is LUNZ. It is housed within the Bio-Protection Research Centre on the Lincoln University campus. In 2007 the collection was moved from wooden storage boxes to 1300 glass-topped Cornell specimen drawers, a move that likely saved the collection from significant damage in the 2010 Canterbury earthquake.

The only university entomology collection in New Zealand, the collection contains over 250,000 pinned insect specimens, including over 70 holotypes and a large collection of specimens in ethanol. It is one of the largest and most diverse insect collections in New Zealand, smaller than the National Arthropod Collection at Landcare Research and comparable in size to holdings at Te Papa. The collection is strongest in South Island species, especially from the West Coast and Southern Alps, with collections from the Chatham Islands, Three Kings, and subantarctic islands. Taxonomically, its strengths are:

- spiders
- beetles (Coleoptera), especially carabid beetles, from the work of Rowan Emberson and Michael Butcher
- South Island tussock grassland moths (Lepidoptera), based on decades of repeated sampling by Graeme White at Cass, and Carol Muir's research interests
- parasitic wasps (Hymenoptera) from John Early's collections
- Diptera, especially from the subantarctic islands, from Roy Harrison's interests

In August 2019 amateur entomologist John Nunn donated thousands of foreign beetle specimens, in 100 boxes, to the collection.

== Publications ==
The following are some publications that are based heavily on the Entomology Research Collections, including taxonomic surveys citing its type specimens.

- Emberson, Rowan M. (1998). "The beetle (Coleoptera) fauna of the Chatham Islands". New Zealand Entomologist. 21 (1): 25–64. doi:10.1080/00779962.1998.9722037. ISSN 0077-9962.
- Marris, J. W. M. (2000). "The beetle (Coleoptera) fauna of the Antipodes Islands, with comments on the impact of mice; and an annotated checklist of the insect and arachnid fauna". Journal of the Royal Society of New Zealand. 30 (2): 169–195. doi:10.1080/03014223.2000.9517616. hdl:10182/5721. ISSN 0303-6758. S2CID 84422117.
- White, E. G. (2002). New Zealand Tussock Grassland Moths. Lincoln, New Zealand: Manaaki Whenua Press. ISBN 0-478-09345-4.
- Bowie, Mike H.; Vink, Cor J. (2002). Measuring diversity and abundance of invertebrates in Ahuriri, Coopers Knob and Orongomai Reserves in the Port Hills, Canterbury. Lincoln University Wildlife Management Report. Vol. 59. Lincoln, New Zealand: Lincoln University. hdl:10182/697.

== Selected type specimens ==
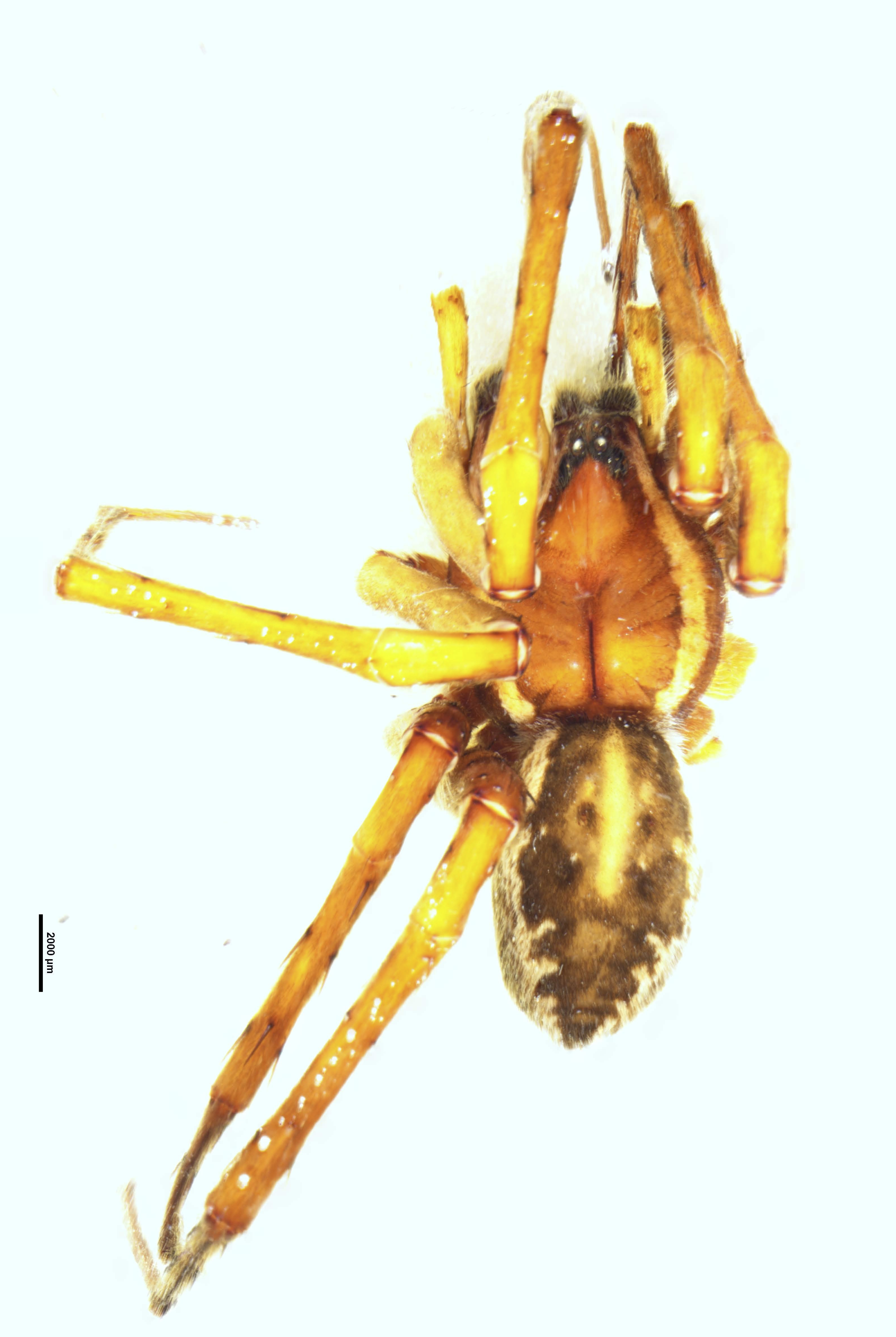
Dolomedes dondalei
Vink & Dupérré 2010

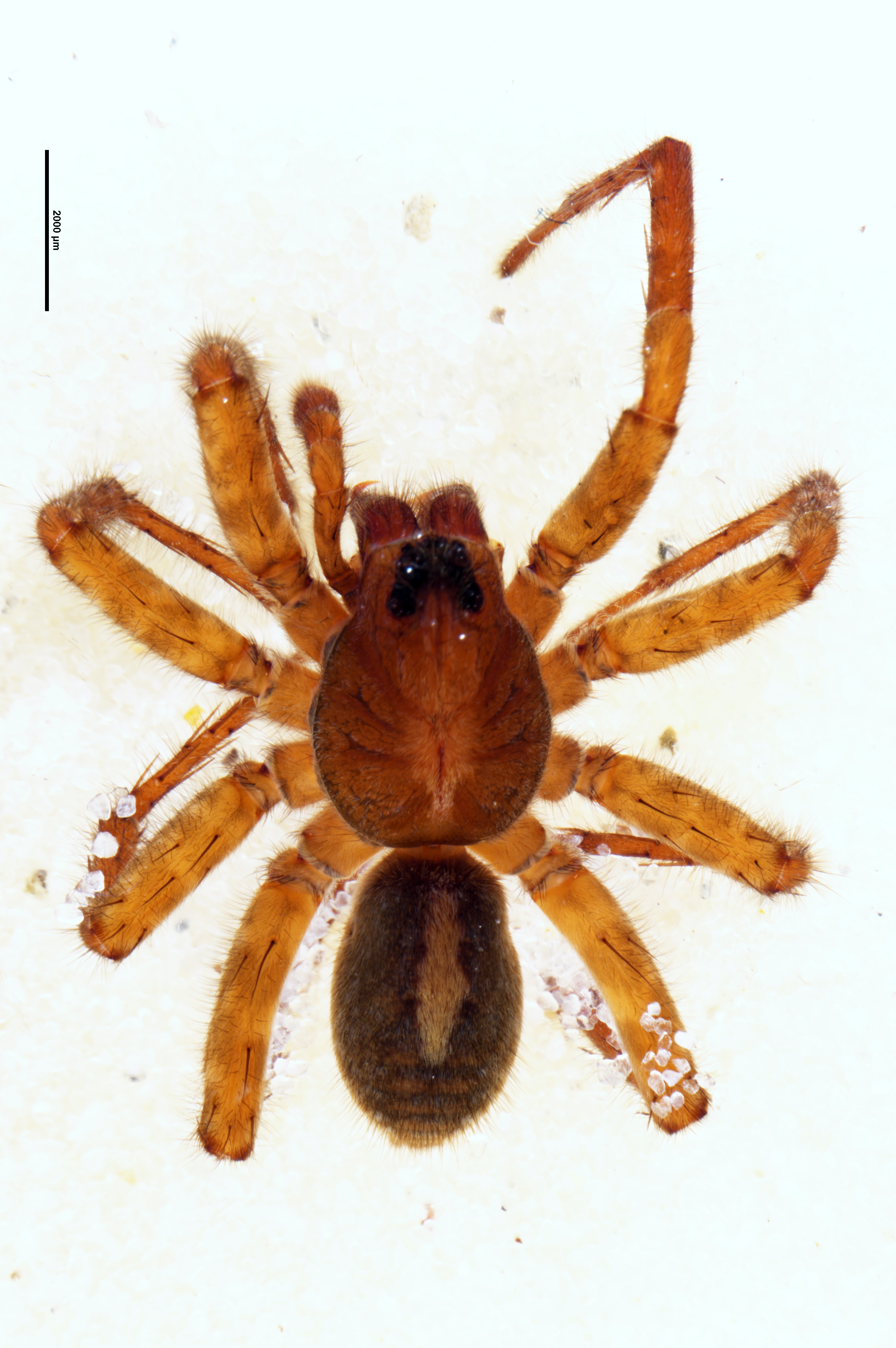
Anoteropsis cantuaria
Vink 2002

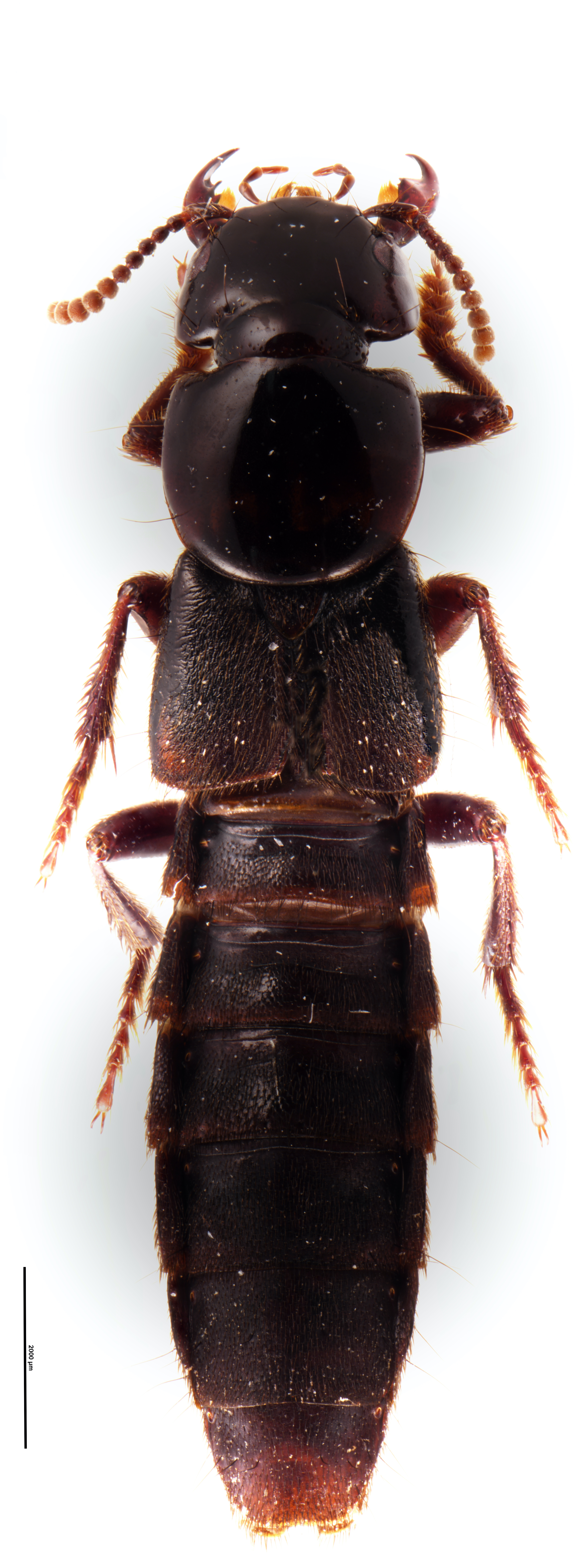
Creophilus rekohuensis
Clarke 2011

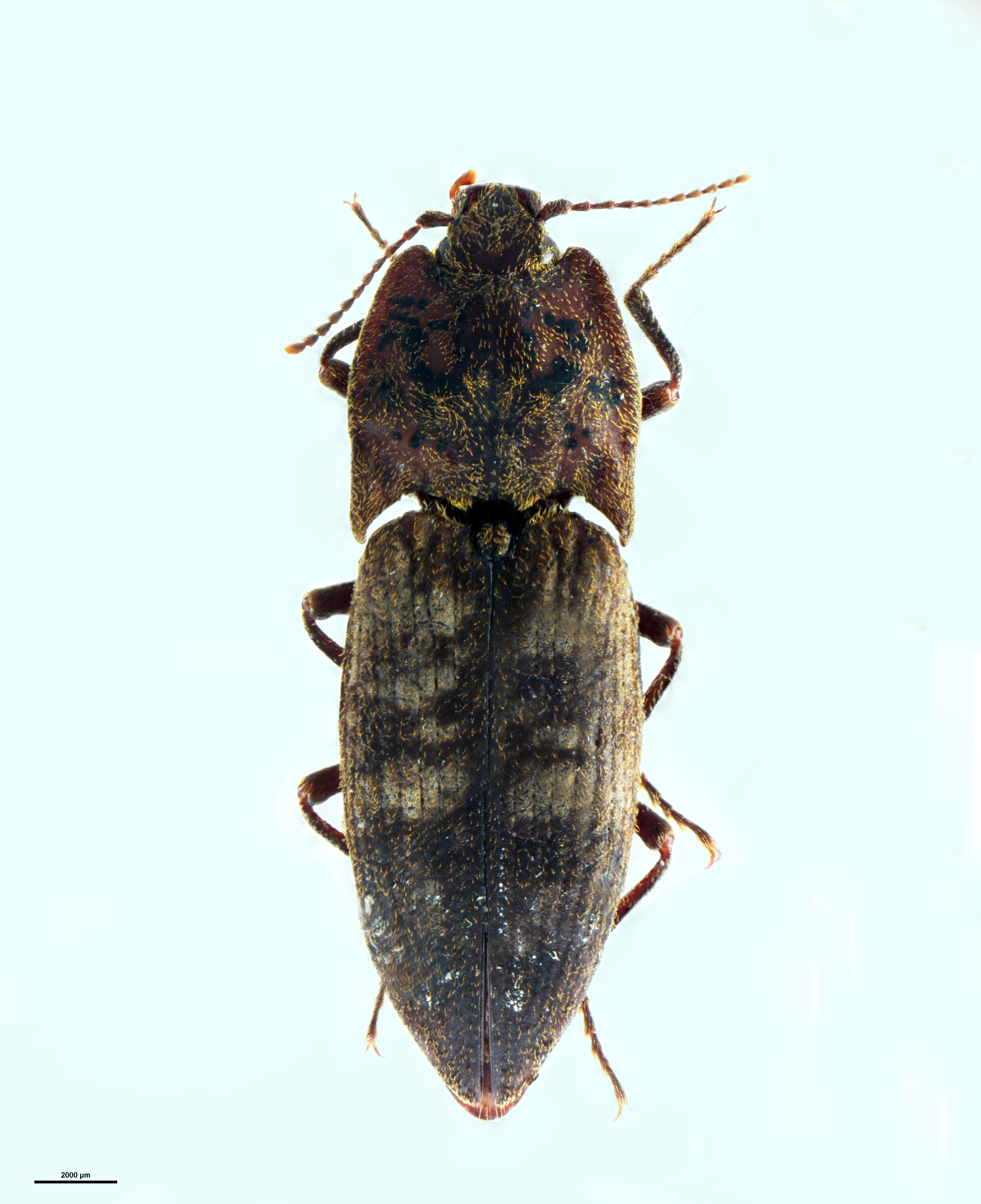
Amychus manawatawhi
Marris & Johnson 2010

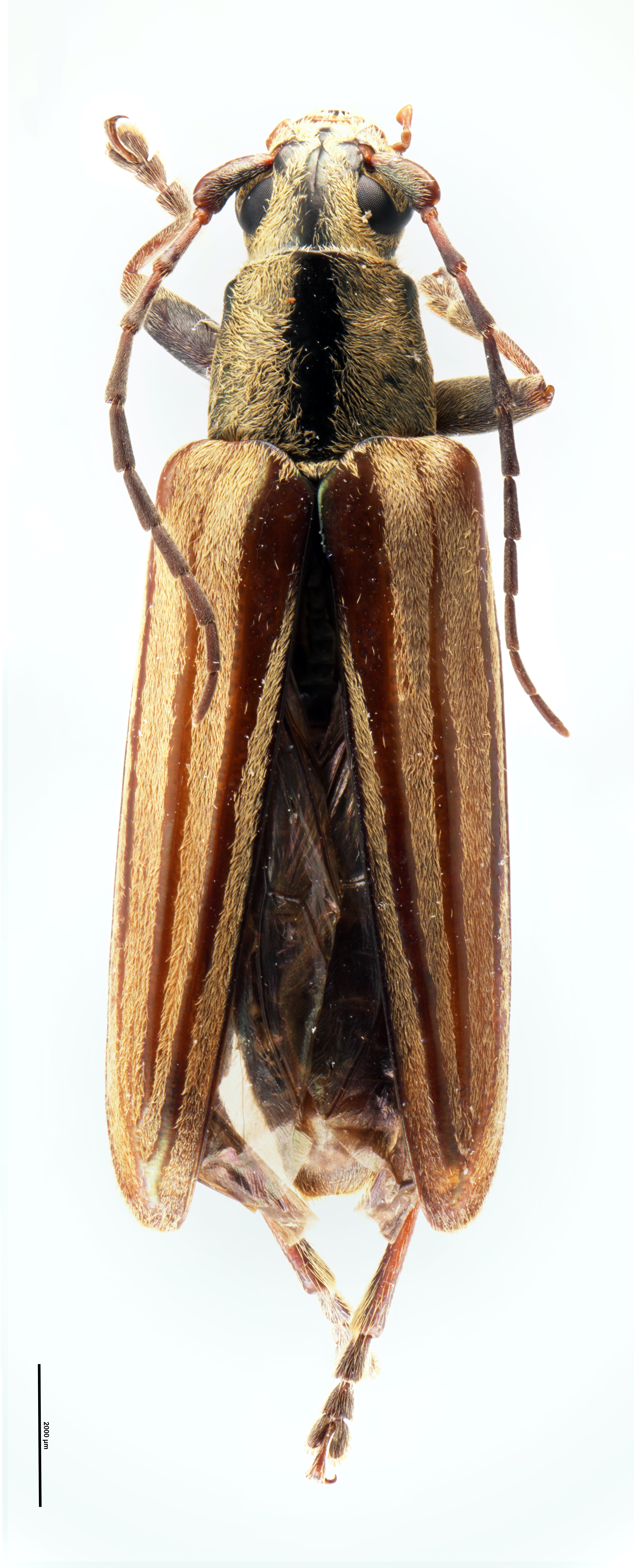
Coptomma marrisi
Song & Wang 2003

== Gallery ==
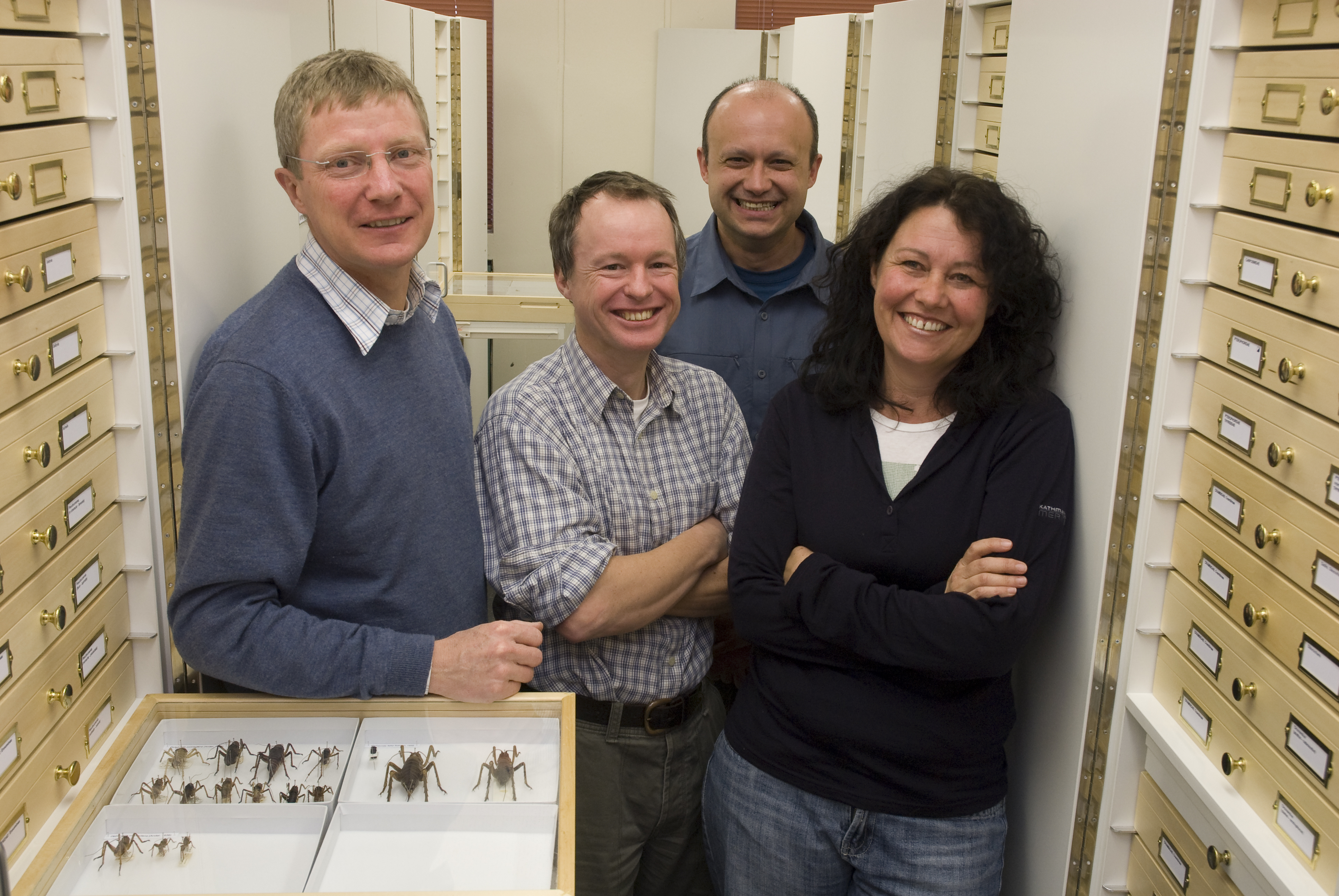
Left to right: curator John Marris, ecology tutor Nathan Curtis, Milen Marinov, and Marlene Leggett

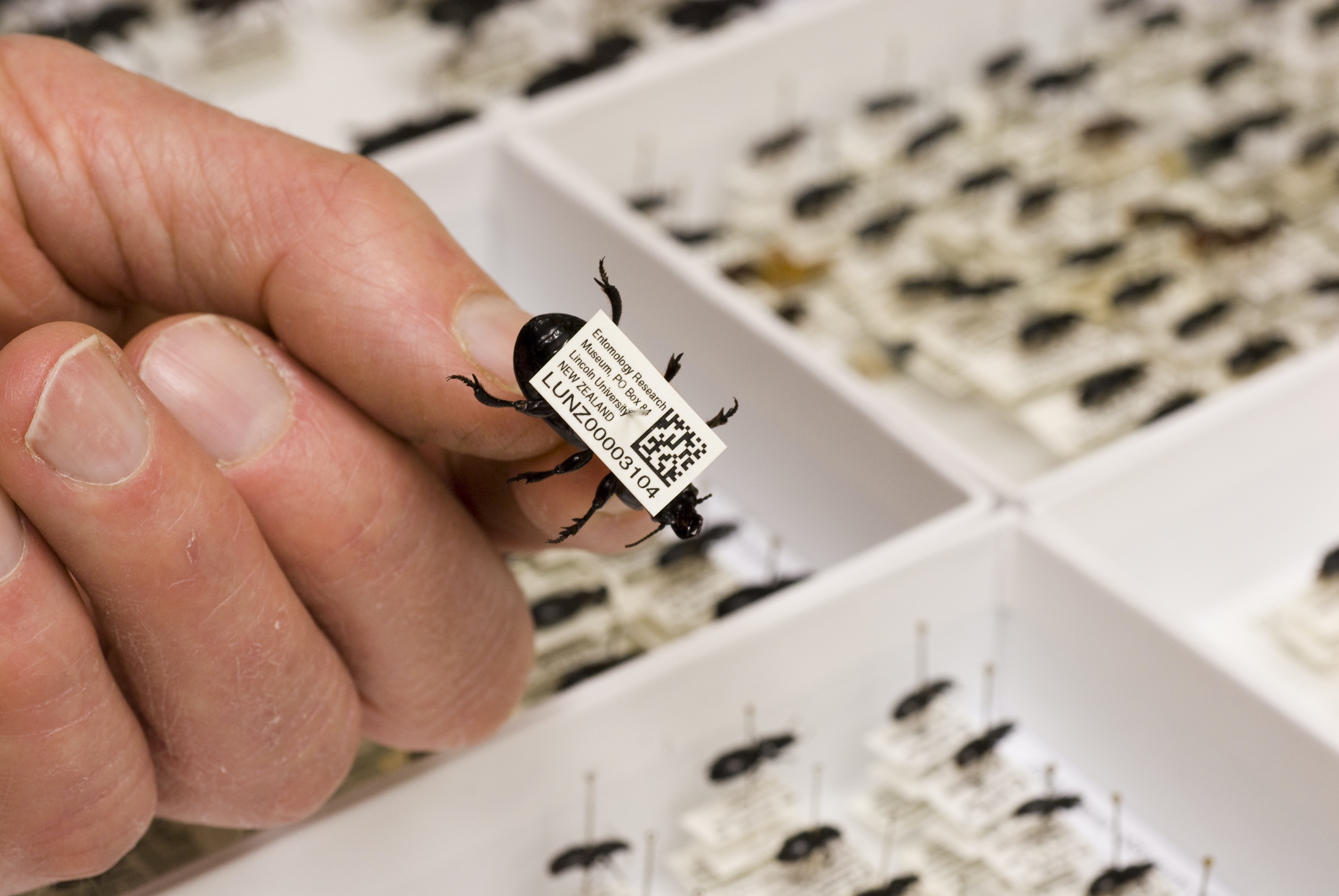
A collection barcode on a pinned beetle specimen

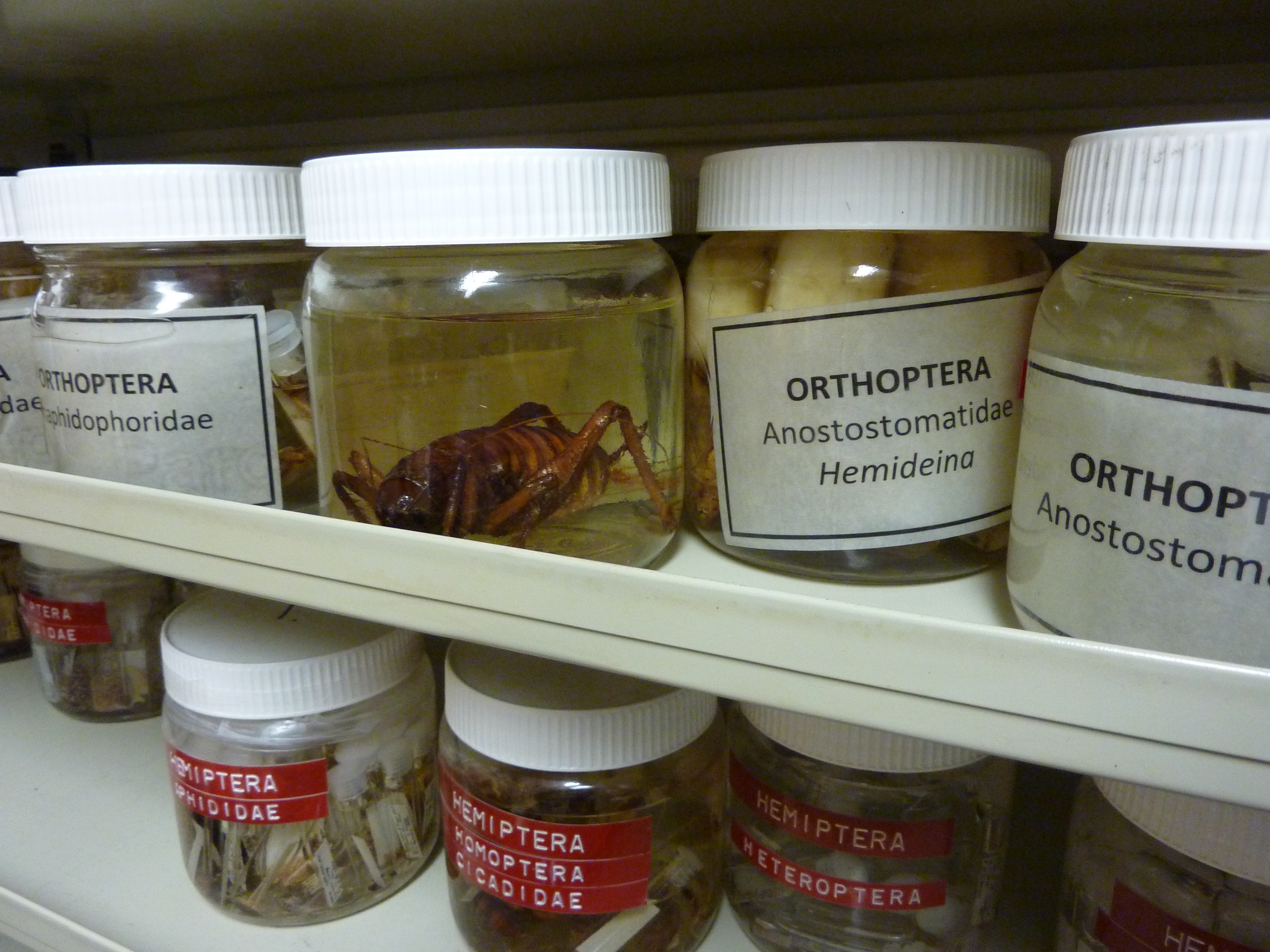
Ethanol-preserved specimens, including wētā

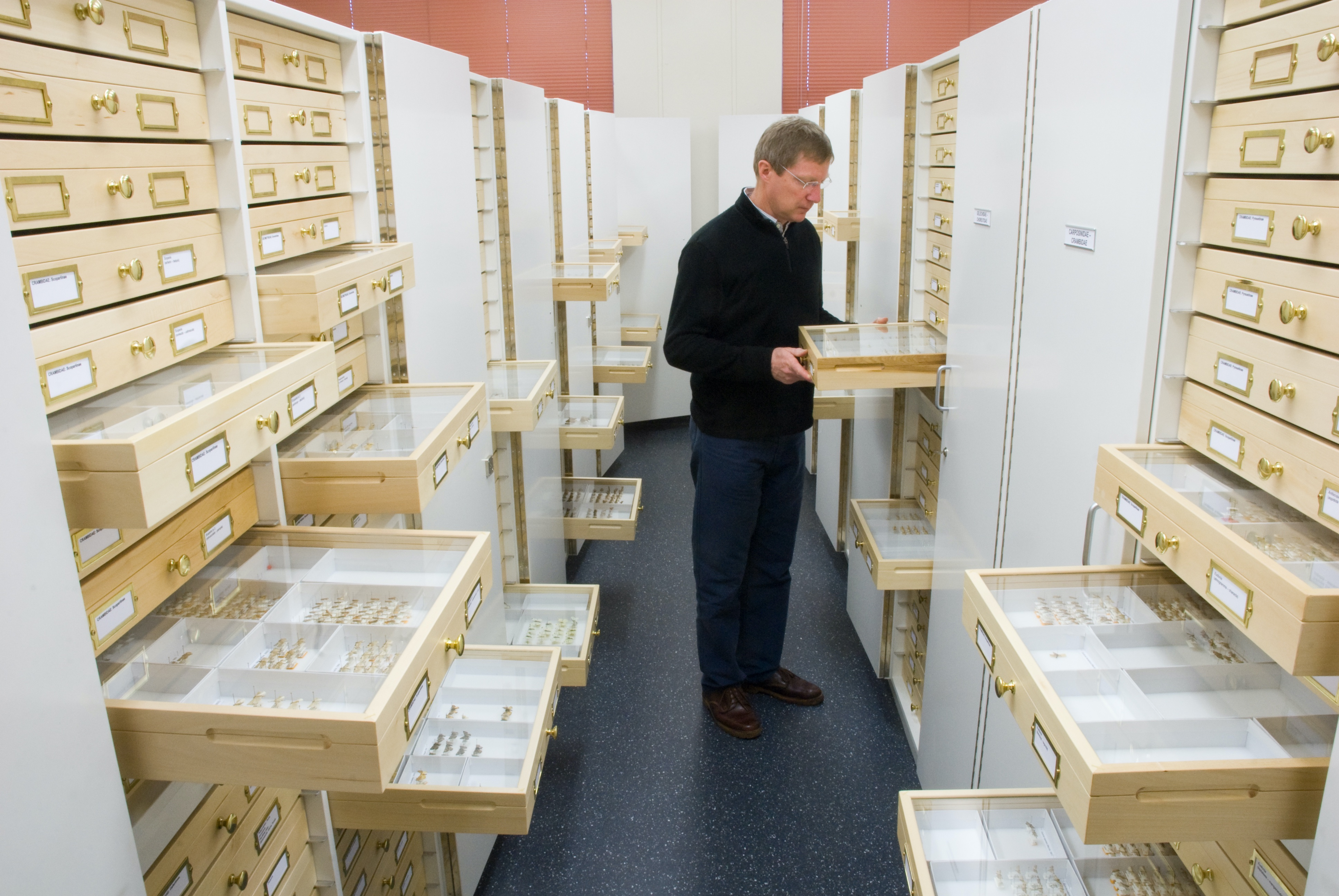
John Marris in the collection
