= C. foliata =

C. foliata may refer to:

- Cambridgea foliata (L. Koch, 1872), a spider species in the genus Cambridgea in the family Desidae found in New Zealand
- Chrysso foliata (L. Koch, 1878), a spider species in the genus Chrysso found in Russia, China, Korea and Japan

== See also ==
- Foliata (disambiguation)
