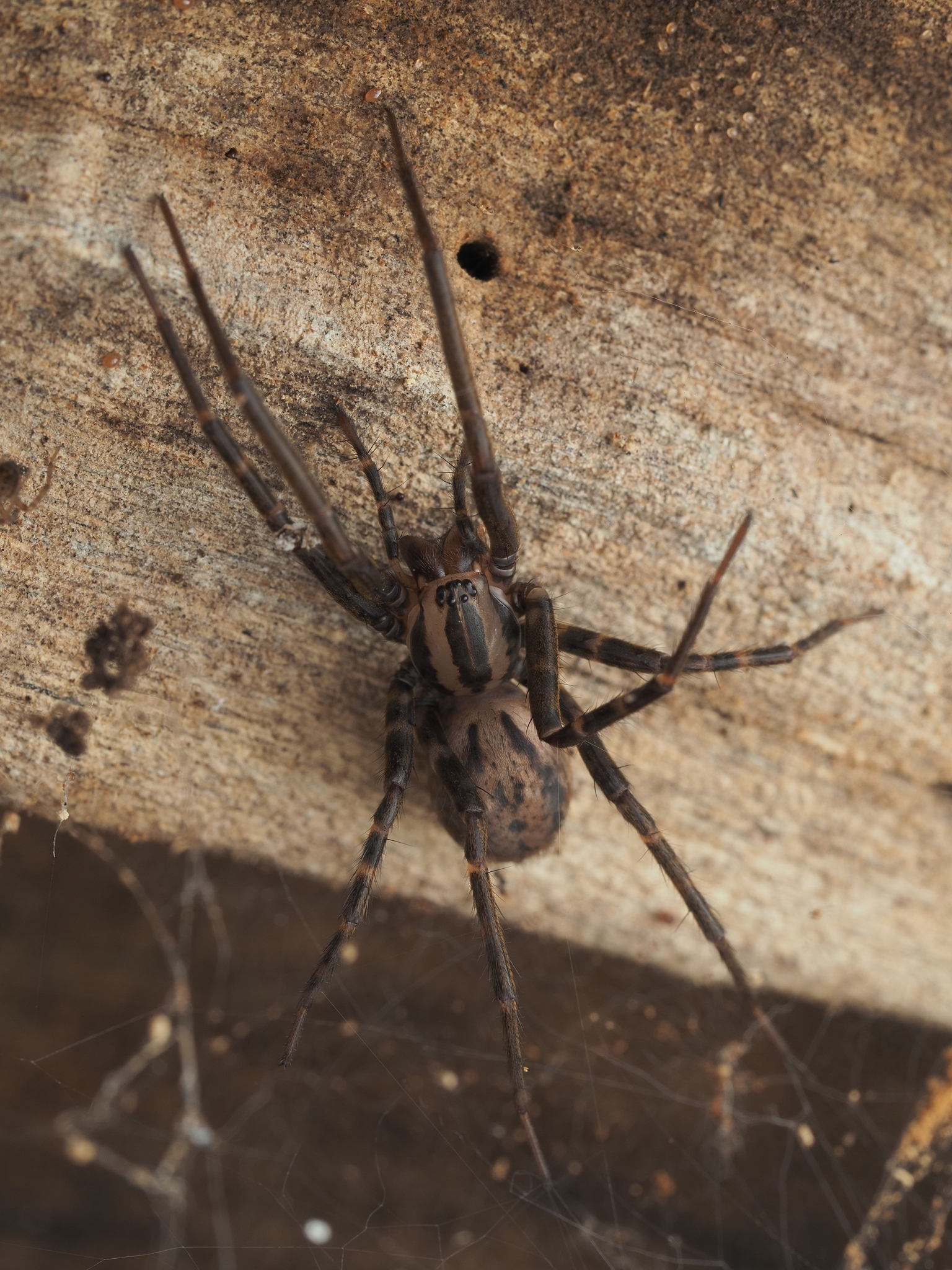

Conservation status
- Not Threatened (NZ TCS)

Scientific classification
- Domain: Eukaryota
- Kingdom: Animalia
- Phylum: Arthropoda
- Subphylum: Chelicerata
- Class: Arachnida
- Order: Araneae
- Infraorder: Araneomorphae
- Family: Desidae
- Genus: Cambridgea
- Species: C. annulata

Binomial name
- Cambridgea annulata Dalmas, 1917

Synonyms
- Cambridgea antipodiana annulata

= Cambridgea annulata =

Species of spider

Cambridgea annulata is a species of Desidae that is endemic to New Zealand.

== Taxonomy ==
This species was originally described as a subspecies by Raymond Comte de Dalmas in 1917. It was elevated to species level in 1973.

== Description ==
The female is recorded at 12.9mm in length whereas the male is 12.5mm. The species closely resembles Cambridgea antipodiana.

== Distribution ==
This species is only known from the Chatham Islands, New Zealand.

== Conservation status ==
Under the New Zealand Threat Classification System, this species is listed as "Not Threatened" with the qualifier of "Island Endemic".
