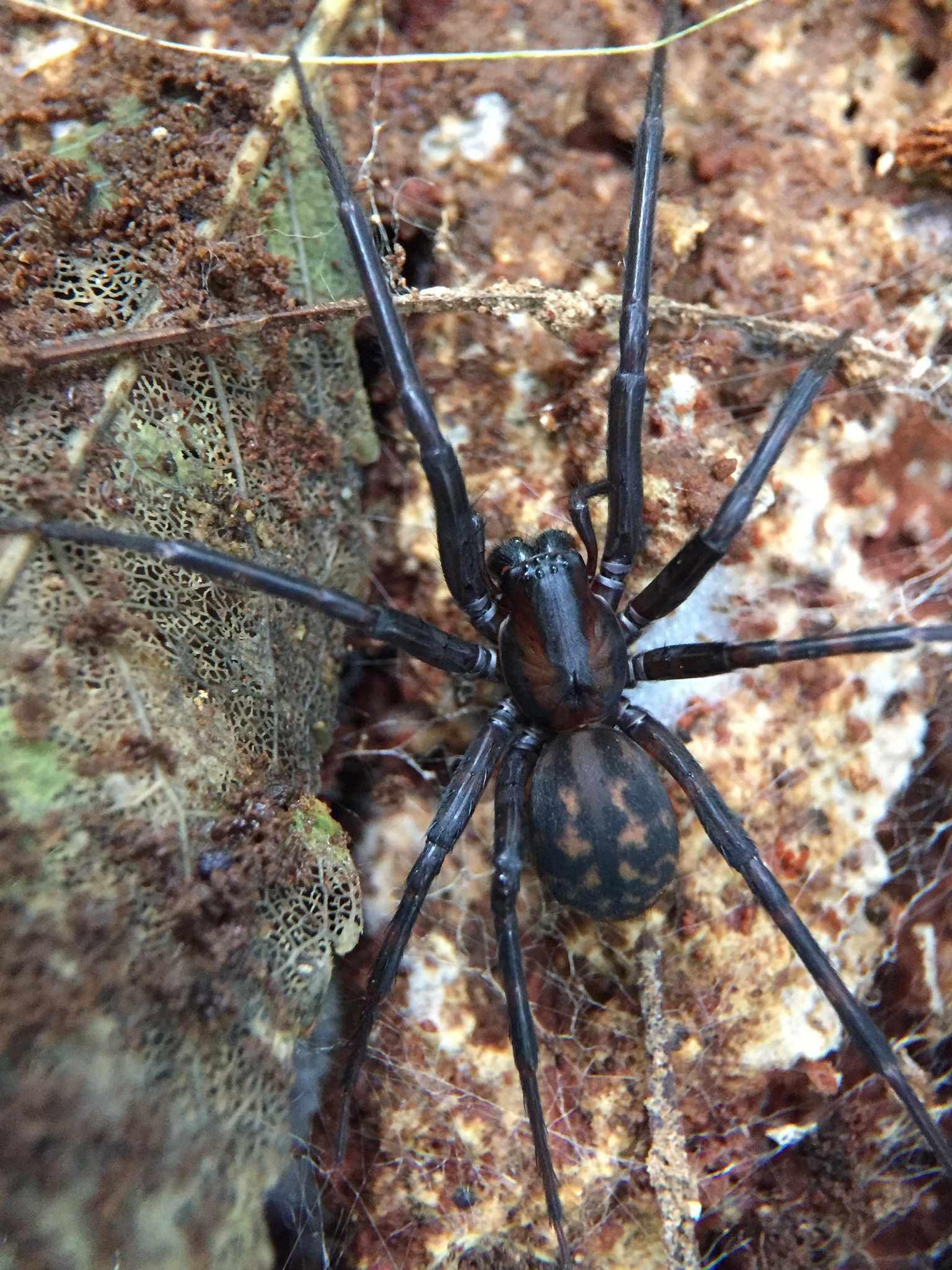

Conservation status
- Not Threatened (NZ TCS)

Scientific classification
- Kingdom: Animalia
- Phylum: Arthropoda
- Subphylum: Chelicerata
- Class: Arachnida
- Order: Araneae
- Infraorder: Araneomorphae
- Family: Desidae
- Genus: Cambridgea
- Species: C. plagiata

Binomial name
- Cambridgea plagiata Forster & Wilton, 1973

= Cambridgea plagiata =

Species of spider

Cambridgea plagiata is a species of Desidae that is endemic to New Zealand.

== Taxonomy ==
This species was described in 1973 by Ray Forster and Cecil Wilton from female and male specimens. The holotype is stored in Otago Museum.

== Description ==
The female is recorded at 12mm in length whereas the male is 14.2mm. The abdomen is shaded grey with a pale area dorsally.

== Distribution ==
This species is only known from the North Island of New Zealand.

== Conservation status ==
Under the New Zealand Threat Classification System, this species is listed as "Not Threatened".
