= Cambridgea arboricola =

Conservation status
- Not Threatened (NZ TCS)

Scientific classification
- Domain: Eukaryota
- Kingdom: Animalia
- Phylum: Arthropoda
- Subphylum: Chelicerata
- Class: Arachnida
- Order: Araneae
- Infraorder: Araneomorphae
- Family: Desidae
- Genus: Cambridgea
- Species: C. arboricola

Binomial name
- Cambridgea arboricola (Urquhart, 1891)

Synonyms
- Tegenaria arbicola

Species of spider

Cambridgea arboricola is a species of Desidae that is endemic to New Zealand.

== Taxonomy ==
This species was described as Tegenaria arbicola by Arthur Urquhart from male and female specimens. It was most recently revised in 1973. The holotype is stored in Canterbury Museum.

== Description ==
The male is recorded at 13.2mm in length whereas the female is 14.8mm. It is similar in appearance to Cambridgea antipodiana.

== Distribution ==
This species occurs throughout the South Island and southern half of the North Island of New Zealand.

== Conservation status ==
Under the New Zealand Threat Classification System, this species is listed as "Not Threatened".
