= Cambridgea australis =

Conservation status
- Naturally Uncommon (NZ TCS)

Scientific classification
- Domain: Eukaryota
- Kingdom: Animalia
- Phylum: Arthropoda
- Subphylum: Chelicerata
- Class: Arachnida
- Order: Araneae
- Infraorder: Araneomorphae
- Family: Desidae
- Genus: Cambridgea
- Species: C. australis

Binomial name
- Cambridgea australis Blest & Vink, 2000

Species of spider

Cambridgea australis is a species of Desidae that is endemic to New Zealand.

== Taxonomy ==
This species was described in 2000 by David Blest and Cor Vink from a male specimen. The holotype is stored in Te Papa Museum under registration number AS.006100.

== Description ==
The male is recorded at 12.75mm in length. The only known specimen is faded in colour.

== Distribution ==
This species is only known from Stewart Island, New Zealand.

== Conservation status ==
Under the New Zealand Threat Classification System, this species is listed as "Naturally Uncommon" with the qualifier of "One Location".
