= Cambridgea solanderensis =

Conservation status
- Data Deficient (NZ TCS)

Scientific classification
- Domain: Eukaryota
- Kingdom: Animalia
- Phylum: Arthropoda
- Subphylum: Chelicerata
- Class: Arachnida
- Order: Araneae
- Infraorder: Araneomorphae
- Family: Desidae
- Genus: Cambridgea
- Species: C. solanderensis

Binomial name
- Cambridgea solanderensis Blest & Vink, 2000

Species of spider

Cambridgea solanderensis is a species of Desidae that is endemic to New Zealand.

== Taxonomy ==
This species was described in 2000 by David Blest and Cor Vink from male and female specimens. The holotype is stored in Te Papa Museum under registration number AS.006102.

== Description ==
The male is recorded at 17.26mm in length whereas the female is 17mm.

== Distribution ==
This species is only known from Solander Island, New Zealand.

== Conservation status ==
Under the New Zealand Threat Classification System, this species is listed as "Data Deficient" with the qualifiers of "Data Poor: Size", "Data Poor: Trend", "Island Endemic" and "One Location".
