= Cambridgea elegans =

Conservation status
- Data Deficient (NZ TCS)

Scientific classification
- Kingdom: Animalia
- Phylum: Arthropoda
- Subphylum: Chelicerata
- Class: Arachnida
- Order: Araneae
- Infraorder: Araneomorphae
- Family: Desidae
- Genus: Cambridgea
- Species: C. elegans

Binomial name
- Cambridgea elegans Blest & Vink, 2000

Species of spider

Cambridgea elegans is a species of spiders in the genus Cambridgea found in New Zealand.

== Taxonomy ==
This species was described in 2000 by David Blest and Cor Vink from male and female specimens. The holotype is stored in Otago Museum.

== Description ==
The male is recorded at 9.01mm in length whereas the female is 12.75mm. The carapace is coloured pale yellow with black stripes. The abdomen is grey with a medial dark stripe.

== Distribution ==
This species is only known from Arthurs Pass, New Zealand.

== Conservation status ==
Under the New Zealand Threat Classification System, this species is listed as "Data Deficient" with the qualifiers of "Data Poor: Size", "Data Poor: Trend" and "One Location".
