= Cambridgea sylvatica =

Conservation status
- Data Deficit (NZ TCS)

Scientific classification
- Kingdom: Animalia
- Phylum: Arthropoda
- Subphylum: Chelicerata
- Class: Arachnida
- Order: Araneae
- Infraorder: Araneomorphae
- Family: Desidae
- Genus: Cambridgea
- Species: C. sylvatica

Binomial name
- Cambridgea sylvatica Forster & Wilton, 1973

Species of spider

Cambridgea sylvatica is a species of Desidae that is endemic to New Zealand.

== Taxonomy ==
This species was described in 1973 by Ray Forster and Cecil Wilton from a male specimen. The holotype is stored in Otago Museum.

== Description ==
The male is recorded at 8.4mm in length. The carapace is coloured pale yellowish brown with a brown band dorsally. The abdomen is pale and darkens laterally and posteriorly.

== Distribution ==
This species is only known from Northland, New Zealand.

== Conservation status ==
Under the New Zealand Threat Classification System, this species is listed as "Data Deficient" with the qualifiers of "Data Poor: Size", "Data Poor: Trend" and "One Location".
