= Cambridgea mercurialis =

Conservation status
- Not Threatened (NZ TCS)

Scientific classification
- Domain: Eukaryota
- Kingdom: Animalia
- Phylum: Arthropoda
- Subphylum: Chelicerata
- Class: Arachnida
- Order: Araneae
- Infraorder: Araneomorphae
- Family: Desidae
- Genus: Cambridgea
- Species: C. mercurialis

Binomial name
- Cambridgea mercurialis Blest & Vink, 2000

Species of spider

Cambridgea mercurialis is a species of Desidae that is endemic to New Zealand.

== Taxonomy ==
This species was described in 2000 by David Blest and Cor Vink from male and female specimens. The holotype is stored in Te Papa Museum.

== Description ==
The male is recorded at 9.5mm in length whereas the female is 15mm.

== Distribution ==
This species is only known from the Mercury Islands, New Zealand.

== Conservation status ==
Under the New Zealand Threat Classification System, this species is listed as "Not Threatened".
