= Cambridgea ordishi =

Conservation status
- Data Deficient (NZ TCS)

Scientific classification
- Domain: Eukaryota
- Kingdom: Animalia
- Phylum: Arthropoda
- Subphylum: Chelicerata
- Class: Arachnida
- Order: Araneae
- Infraorder: Araneomorphae
- Family: Desidae
- Genus: Cambridgea
- Species: C. ordishi

Binomial name
- Cambridgea ordishi Blest & Vink, 2000

Species of spider

Cambridgea ordishi is a species of Desidae that is endemic to New Zealand.

== Taxonomy ==
This species was described in 2000 by David Blest and Cor Vink from male specimens. The holotype is stored in Te Papa Museum under registration number AS.006104.

== Description ==
The male is recorded at 11.25mm in length.

== Distribution ==
This species is only known from Whanganui, New Zealand.

== Conservation status ==
Under the New Zealand Threat Classification System, this species is listed as "Data Deficient" with the qualifiers of "Data Poor: Size", "Data Poor: Trend" and "One Location".
