= Cambridgea fasciata =

Conservation status
- Not Threatened (NZ TCS)

Scientific classification
- Domain: Eukaryota
- Kingdom: Animalia
- Phylum: Arthropoda
- Subphylum: Chelicerata
- Class: Arachnida
- Order: Araneae
- Infraorder: Araneomorphae
- Family: Desidae
- Genus: Cambridgea
- Species: C. fasciata

Binomial name
- Cambridgea fasciata Koch, 1872

Species of spider

Cambridgea fasciata is a species of Desidae that is endemic to New Zealand.

== Taxonomy ==
This species was described by Ludwig Carl Christian Koch. It was most recently revised in 1973.

== Description ==
The female is recorded at 9.2mm in length whereas the male is 6.7mm.

== Distribution ==
This species is only known from the North Island of New Zealand.

== Conservation status ==
Under the New Zealand Threat Classification System, this species is listed as "Not Threatened".
