= Cambridgea pallidula =

Conservation status
- Not Threatened (NZ TCS)

Scientific classification
- Domain: Eukaryota
- Kingdom: Animalia
- Phylum: Arthropoda
- Subphylum: Chelicerata
- Class: Arachnida
- Order: Araneae
- Infraorder: Araneomorphae
- Family: Desidae
- Genus: Cambridgea
- Species: C. pallidula

Binomial name
- Cambridgea pallidula Blest & Vink, 2000

Species of spider

Cambridgea pallidula is a species of Desidae that is endemic to New Zealand.

== Taxonomy ==
This species was described in 2000 by David Blest and Cor Vink from male and female specimens. The holotype is stored in Te Papa Museum under registration number AS.006099.

== Description ==
The male is recorded at 7.2mm in length whereas the female is 10.5mm. The carapace is coloured light yellow with grey stripes laterally and dorsally. The abdomen is pale dorsally and is shaded laterally and posteriorly.

== Distribution ==
This species is only known from scattered localities in the North Island and South Island of New Zealand.

== Conservation status ==
Under the New Zealand Threat Classification System, this species is listed as "Not Threatened".
