= Cambridgea elongata =

Conservation status
- Not Threatened (NZ TCS)

Scientific classification
- Domain: Eukaryota
- Kingdom: Animalia
- Phylum: Arthropoda
- Subphylum: Chelicerata
- Class: Arachnida
- Order: Araneae
- Infraorder: Araneomorphae
- Family: Desidae
- Genus: Cambridgea
- Species: C. elongata

Binomial name
- Cambridgea elongata Blest & Vink, 2000

Species of spider

Cambridgea elongata is a species of Desidae that is endemic to New Zealand.

== Taxonomy ==
This species was described in 2000 by David Blest and Cor Vink from male and female specimens. The holotype is stored in Te Papa Museum under registration number AS.006101.

== Description ==
The male is recorded at 13.5mm in length whereas the female is 11.55mm. The carapace is coloured light brown and has a median stripe. The legs are weakly banded. The abdomen is pale dorsally and has dark shading laterally and posteriorly.

== Distribution ==
This species is only known from Wellington, New Zealand.

== Conservation status ==
Under the New Zealand Threat Classification System, this species is listed as "Not Threatened".
