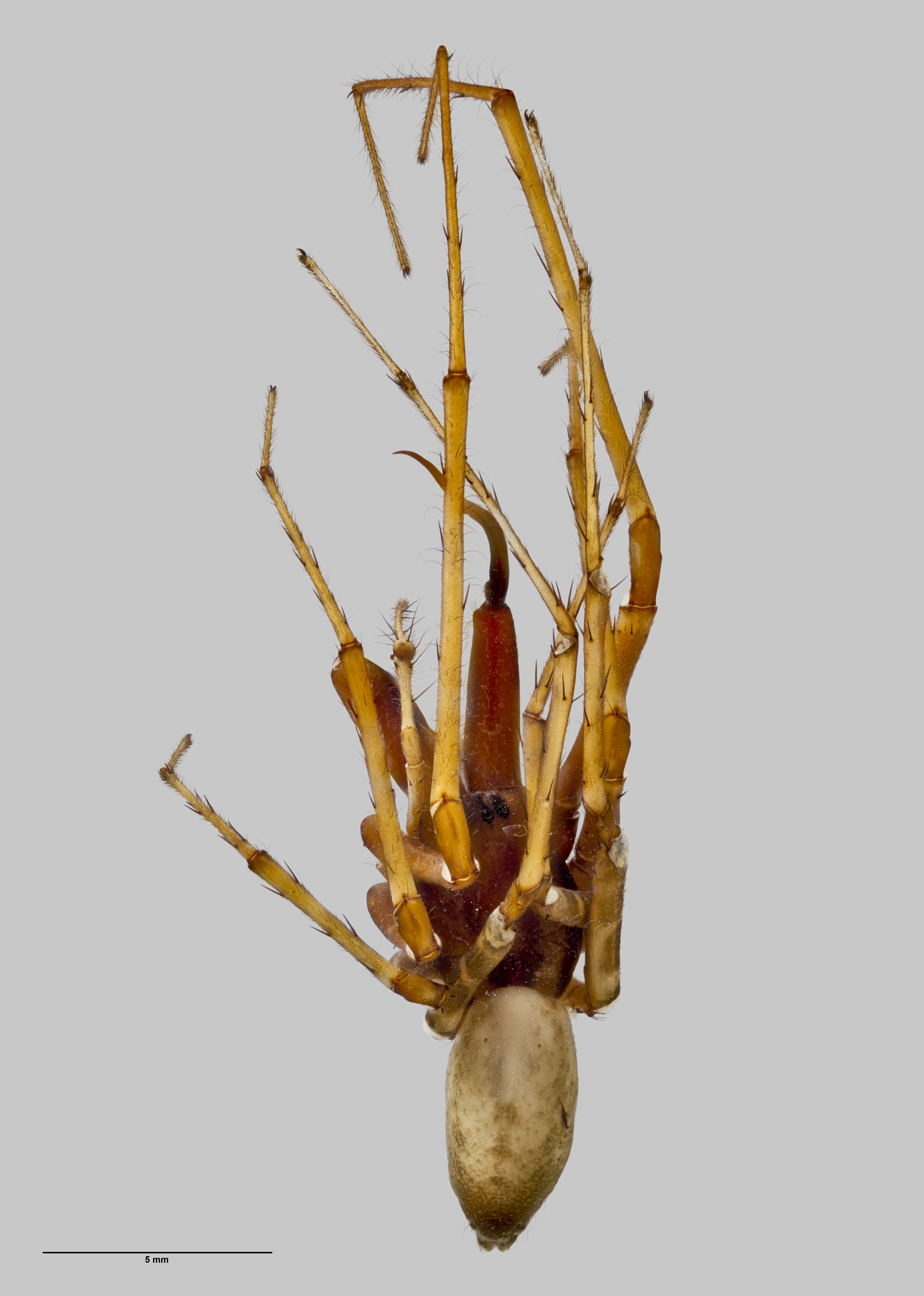

Conservation status
- Naturally Uncommon (NZ TCS)

Scientific classification
- Kingdom: Animalia
- Phylum: Arthropoda
- Subphylum: Chelicerata
- Class: Arachnida
- Order: Araneae
- Infraorder: Araneomorphae
- Family: Desidae
- Genus: Cambridgea
- Species: C. reinga

Binomial name
- Cambridgea reinga Forster & Wilton, 1973

Synonyms
- Nanocambridgea grandis Blest & Vink, 2000

= Cambridgea reinga =

Species of spider

Cambridgea reinga is a species of Desidae that is endemic to New Zealand. It is known to have two forms of male, with the larger form having porrect chelicerae and the smaller form having non-porrect chelicerae.

== Taxonomy ==
This species was described in 1973 by Ray Forster and Cecil Wilton from a female specimen. It was most recently revised in 2011, in which the male was described. The holotype is stored in Auckland War Memorial Museum under registration number AMNZ5031.

Nanocambridgea grandis is considered to be a synonym of C. reinga.

== Description ==
The female is recorded at 9.13mm in length whereas the male is 8.8mm on average. The carapace is coloured orange brown with blackish bands laterally and a median pale stripe. The legs are yellow brown with faint bands. The abdomen is pale yellow brown. It is best distinguished from other Cambridgea species by the structure of the male and female genitalia.

Two forms of male are known for this species. One is larger and has porrect chelicerae typical of male Cambridgea, while the other is smaller (6.0-6.8mm) and has non-porrect chelicerae. Genetic data and the form of the male palp show these two morphs are conspecific.

== Distribution ==
This species is only known from Cape Reinga, New Zealand.

== Conservation status ==
Under the New Zealand Threat Classification System, this species is listed as "Naturally Uncommon".
