= Cambridgea inaequalis =

Conservation status
- Not Threatened (NZ TCS)

Scientific classification
- Domain: Eukaryota
- Kingdom: Animalia
- Phylum: Arthropoda
- Subphylum: Chelicerata
- Class: Arachnida
- Order: Araneae
- Infraorder: Araneomorphae
- Family: Desidae
- Genus: Cambridgea
- Species: C. inaequalis

Binomial name
- Cambridgea inaequalis Blest & Vink, 2000

Species of spider

Cambridgea inaequalis is a species of Desidae that is endemic to New Zealand.

== Taxonomy ==
This species was described in 2000 by David Blest and Cor Vink from male and female specimens. The holotype is stored in Otago Museum.

== Description ==
The male is recorded at 8.70mm in length whereas the female is 13.2mm. The carapace is coloured pale yellow and has a median stripe. The abdomen is pale yellow with a dark pattern dorsally.

== Distribution ==
This species is only known from Banks Peninsula, New Zealand.

== Conservation status ==
Under the New Zealand Threat Classification System, this species is listed as "Not Threatened".
