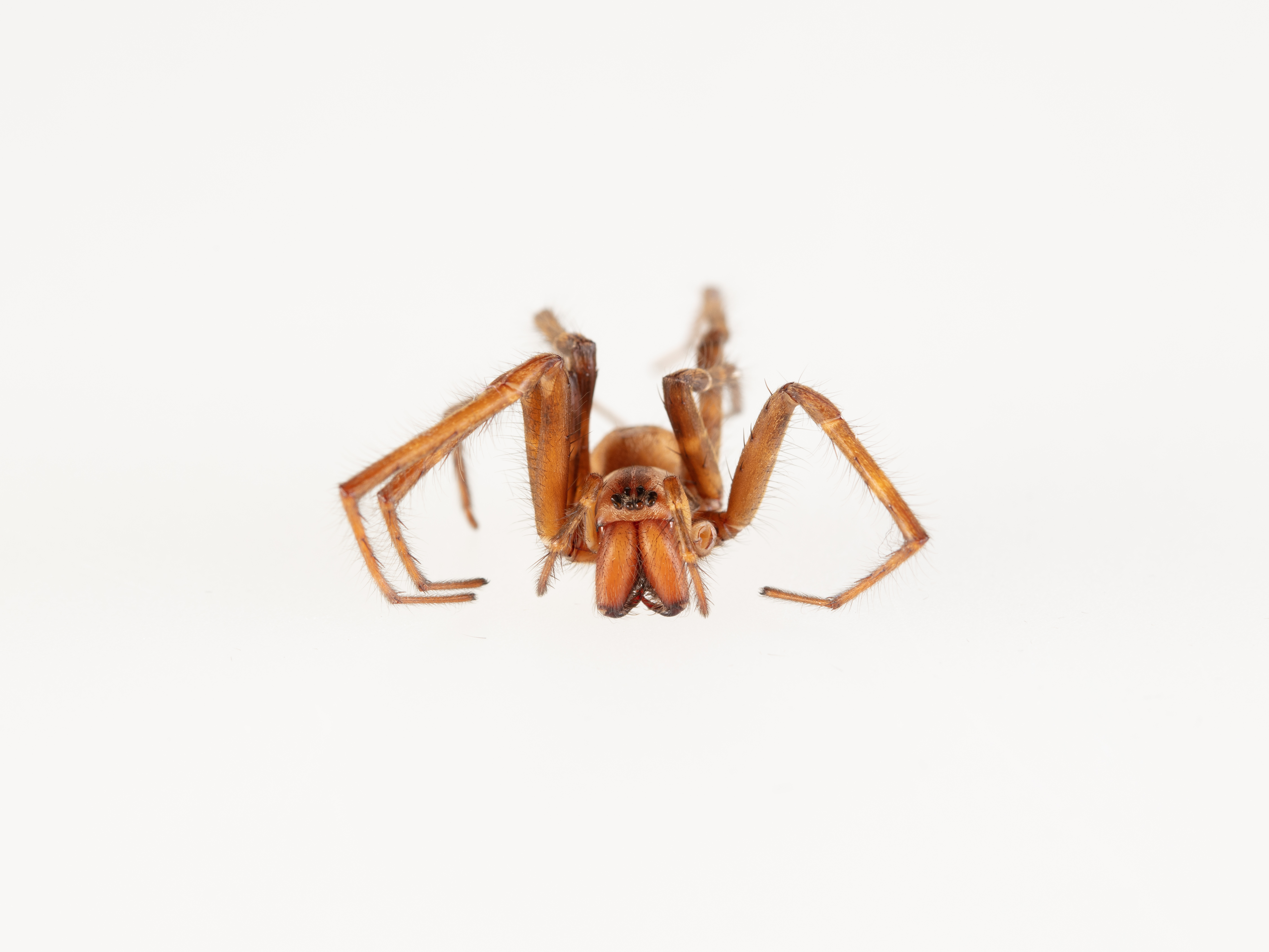

Conservation status
- Not Threatened (NZ TCS)

Scientific classification
- Domain: Eukaryota
- Kingdom: Animalia
- Phylum: Arthropoda
- Subphylum: Chelicerata
- Class: Arachnida
- Order: Araneae
- Infraorder: Araneomorphae
- Family: Desidae
- Genus: Cambridgea
- Species: C. peelensis

Binomial name
- Cambridgea peelensis Blest & Vink, 2000

= Cambridgea peelensis =

Species of spider

Cambridgea peelensis is a species of Desidae that is endemic to New Zealand.

== Taxonomy ==
This species was described in 2000 by David Blest and Cor Vink from male and female specimens. The holotype is stored in Otago Museum.

== Description ==
The male is recorded at 12.25mm in length whereas the female is 11.63mm. The carapace is coloured light yellow with lateral and medial bands. The abdomen is orange brown with grey blotches.

== Distribution ==
This species is only known from Peel Forest, New Zealand.

== Conservation status ==
Under the New Zealand Threat Classification System, this species is listed as "Not Threatened".
