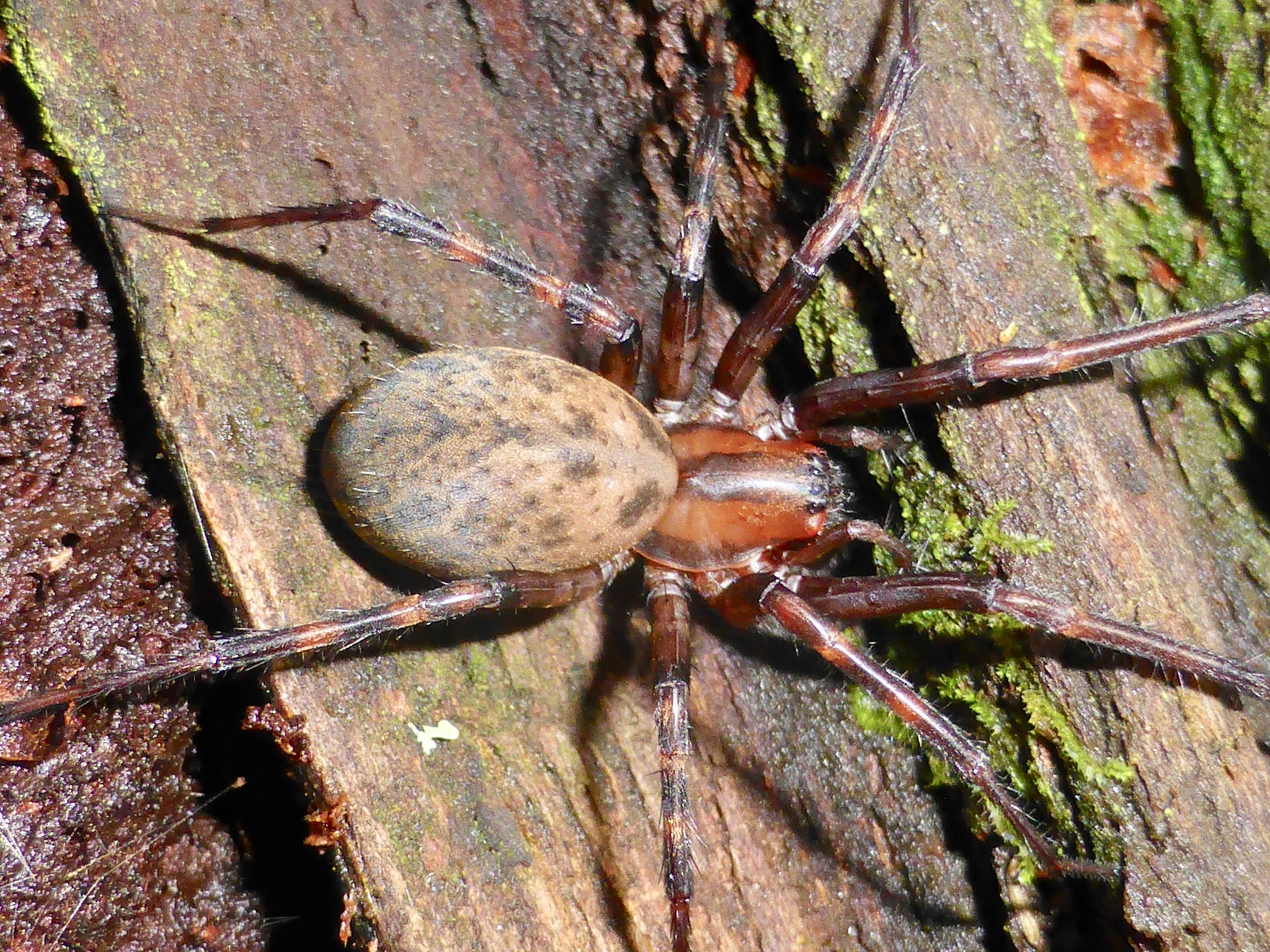

Conservation status
- Not Threatened (NZ TCS)

Scientific classification
- Domain: Eukaryota
- Kingdom: Animalia
- Phylum: Arthropoda
- Subphylum: Chelicerata
- Class: Arachnida
- Order: Araneae
- Infraorder: Araneomorphae
- Family: Desidae
- Genus: Cambridgea
- Species: C. quadromaculata

Binomial name
- Cambridgea quadromaculata Blest & Taylor, 1995

= Cambridgea quadromaculata =

Species of spider

Cambridgea quadromaculata is a species of Desidae that is endemic to New Zealand.

== Taxonomy ==
This species was described in 1995 by David Blest and Christopher Kenneth Taylor from male and female specimens. It was most recently revised in 2000. The holotype is stored in Otago Museum.

== Description ==
The male is recorded at 13.8mm in length whereas the female is 17.55mm. The carapace is coloured yellow brown with a median dark band and lateral dark bands. The legs are banded. The abdomen is pale brown with dark blotches dorsally and lateral blotching.

== Distribution ==
This species is only known from Christchurch, New Zealand.

== Conservation status ==
Under the New Zealand Threat Classification System, this species is listed as "Not Threatened".
