= Cambridgea tuiae =

Conservation status
- Data Deficient (NZ TCS)

Scientific classification
- Domain: Eukaryota
- Kingdom: Animalia
- Phylum: Arthropoda
- Subphylum: Chelicerata
- Class: Arachnida
- Order: Araneae
- Infraorder: Araneomorphae
- Family: Desidae
- Genus: Cambridgea
- Species: C. tuiae

Binomial name
- Cambridgea tuiae Blest & Vink, 2000

Species of spider

Cambridgea tuiae is a species of Desidae that is endemic to New Zealand.

== Taxonomy ==
This species was described in 2000 by David Blest and Cor Vink from a female specimen. The holotype is stored in Otago Museum.

== Description ==
The female is recorded at 10.1mm in length. The carapace is pale in colour and has median and lateral bands. The abdomen is pale ground and has a chevron pattern dorsally.

== Distribution ==
This species is only known from Te Aroha, New Zealand.

== Conservation status ==
Under the New Zealand Threat Classification System, this species is listed as "Data Deficient" with the qualifiers of "Data Poor: Size", "Data Poor: Trend" and "One Location".
