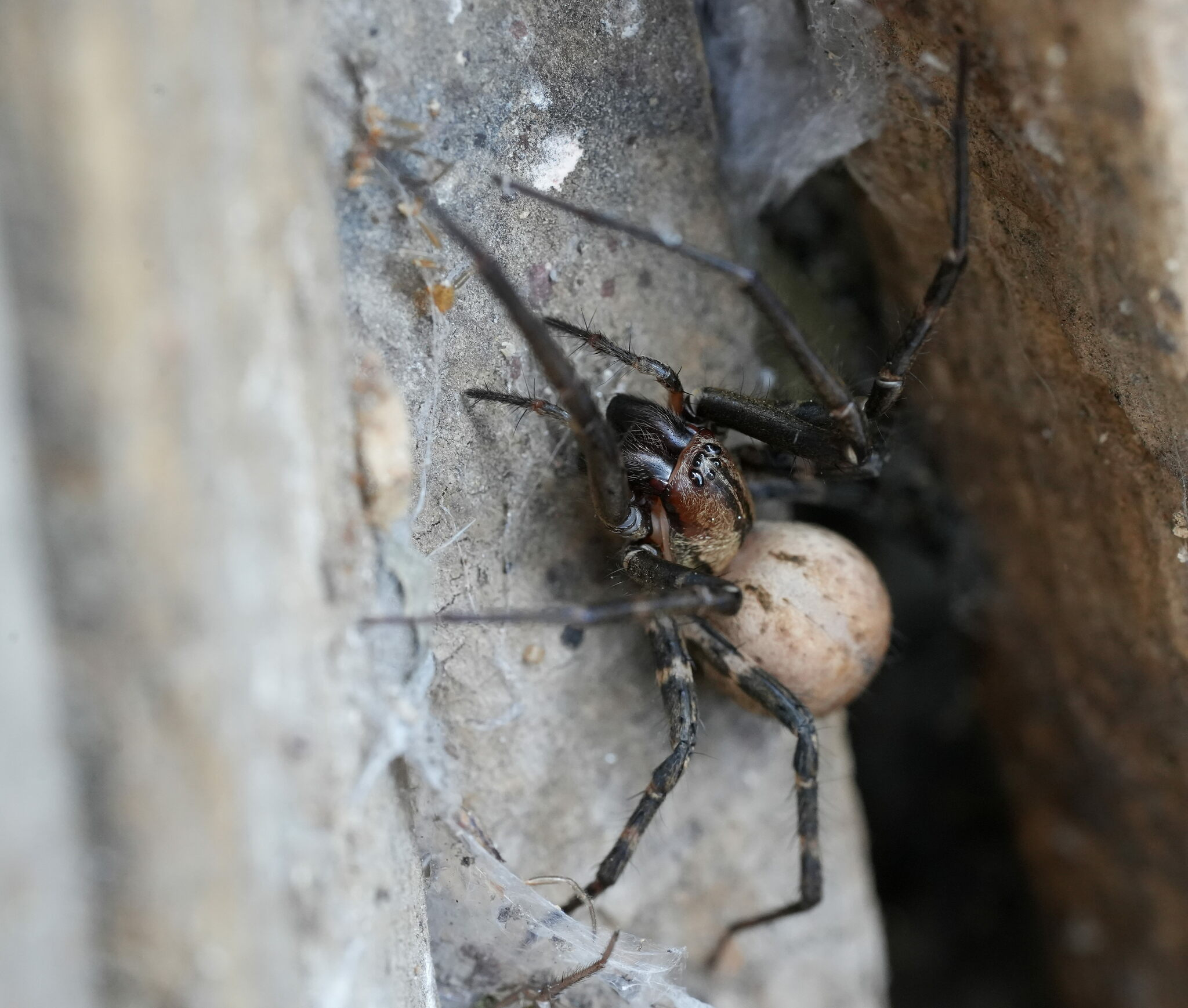

Conservation status
- Not Threatened (NZ TCS)

Scientific classification
- Domain: Eukaryota
- Kingdom: Animalia
- Phylum: Arthropoda
- Subphylum: Chelicerata
- Class: Arachnida
- Order: Araneae
- Infraorder: Araneomorphae
- Family: Desidae
- Genus: Cambridgea
- Species: C. ambigua

Binomial name
- Cambridgea ambigua Blest & Vink, 2000

= Cambridgea ambigua =

Species of spider

Cambridgea ambigua is a species of Desidae that is endemic to New Zealand.

== Taxonomy ==
This species was described in 2000 by David Blest and Cor Vink from male and female specimens. The holotype is stored in Otago Museum.

== Description ==
The male is recorded at 12.15mm in length whereas the female is 12mm. The carapace is coloured pale straw. The legs are dark with bands. The abdomen is pale straw.

== Distribution ==
This species is only known from Christchurch, New Zealand.

== Conservation status ==
Under the New Zealand Threat Classification System, this species is listed as "Not Threatened".
