= Cambridgea occidentalis =

Conservation status
- Data Deficit (NZ TCS)

Scientific classification
- Kingdom: Animalia
- Phylum: Arthropoda
- Subphylum: Chelicerata
- Class: Arachnida
- Order: Araneae
- Infraorder: Araneomorphae
- Family: Desidae
- Genus: Cambridgea
- Species: C. occidentalis

Binomial name
- Cambridgea occidentalis Forster & Wilton, 1973

Species of spider

Cambridgea occidentalis is a species of Desidae that is endemic to New Zealand.

== Taxonomy ==
This species was described in 1973 by Ray Forster and Cecil Wilton from female specimens. The holotype is stored in Otago Museum.

== Description ==
The female is recorded at 13.7mm in length. The carapace is coloured orange brown and darkens anteriorly. The legs are yellow brown. The abdomen is darkly coloured with dark patches dorsally.

== Distribution ==
This species is only known from Whero Island, New Zealand.

== Conservation status ==
Under the New Zealand Threat Classification System, this species is listed as "Data Deficient" with the qualifiers of "Data Poor: Size" and "Data Poor: Trend".
