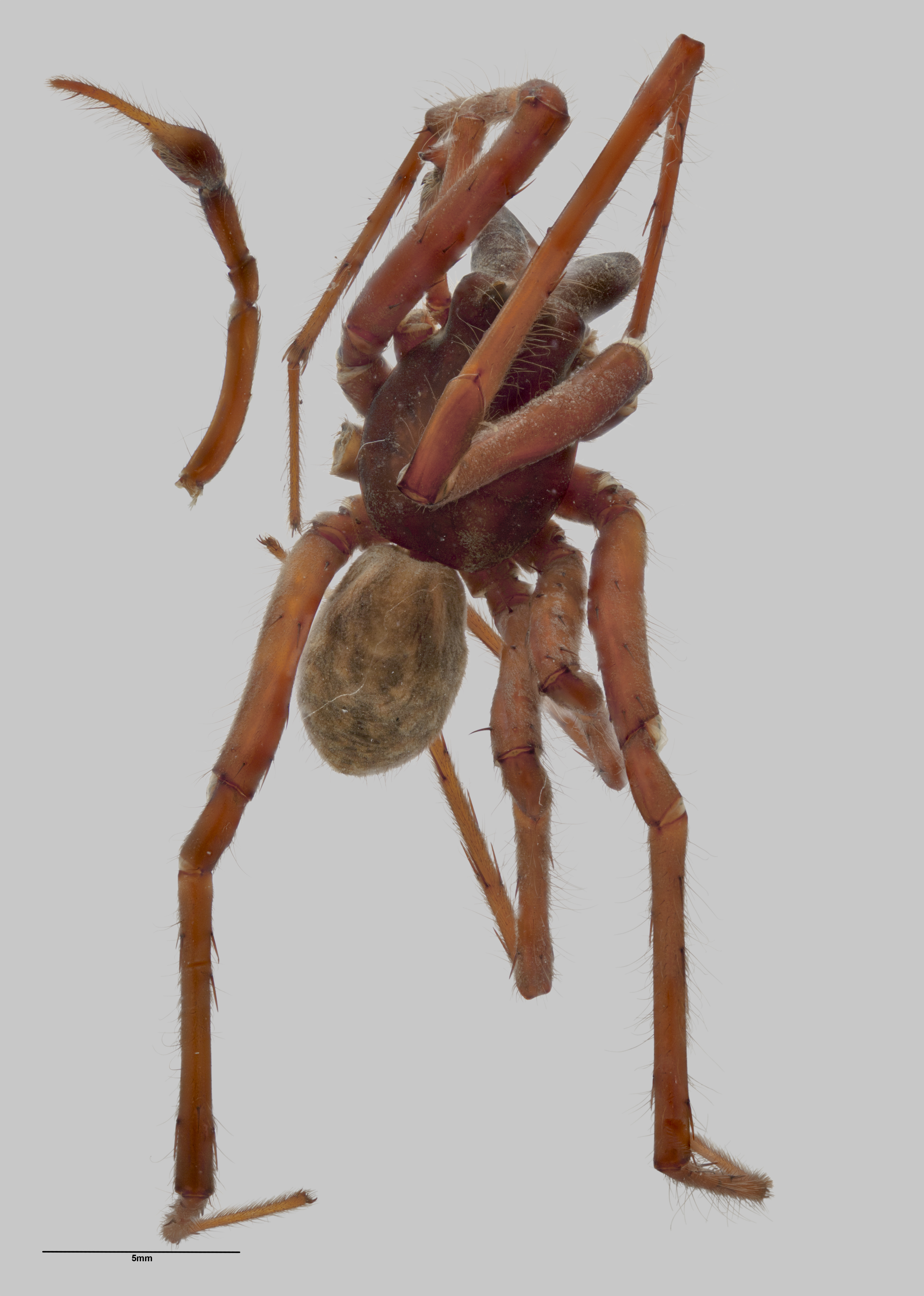

Scientific classification
- Kingdom: Animalia
- Phylum: Arthropoda
- Subphylum: Chelicerata
- Class: Arachnida
- Order: Araneae
- Infraorder: Araneomorphae
- Family: Desidae
- Genus: Cambridgea
- Species: C. elegans

Binomial name
- Cambridgea elegans Blest & Vink, 2000

= Cambridgea decorata =

Species of spider

Cambridgea decorata is a species of spiders in the genus Cambridgea found only in New Zealand. It is classified as "data deficient" under the New Zealand Threat Classification System. The only published records are of specimens collected in the 1940s from Parnell (male holotype), and Waiheke Island (females). Both localities are in Auckland.
