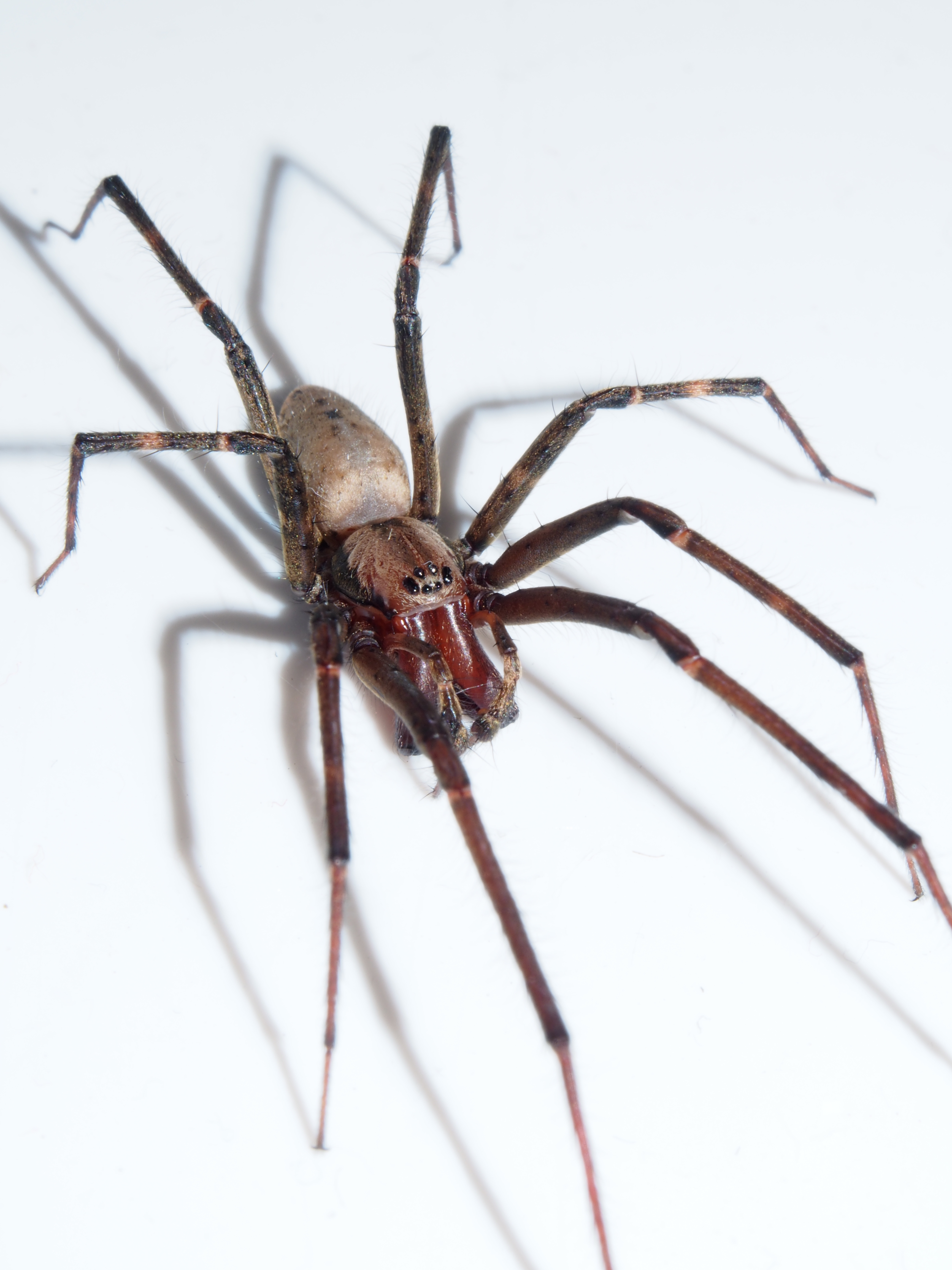

Conservation status
- Not Threatened (NZ TCS)

Scientific classification
- Kingdom: Animalia
- Phylum: Arthropoda
- Subphylum: Chelicerata
- Class: Arachnida
- Order: Araneae
- Infraorder: Araneomorphae
- Family: Desidae
- Genus: Cambridgea
- Species: C. foliata

Binomial name
- Cambridgea foliata (Koch, 1872)

Synonyms
- Tegenaria foliata

= Cambridgea foliata =

Species of spider

Cambridgea foliata, commonly known as the New Zealand sheet-web spider, is a species of spider in the family Desidae. These nocturnal, arboreal spiders are endemic to the North Island of New Zealand and build large horizontal sheet-webs with a large number of knock-down threads.

== Taxonomy ==
This species was described as Tengeria foliata by Ludwig Carl Christian Koch. It was moved to the Cambridgea genus in 1898. It was most recently revised in 1973. The holotype location is considered unknown.

== Description ==
C. foliata have a reddish-brown cephalothorax and greyish yellow abdomen. While males and females of this species are of a similar size with a cephalothorax width of approximately 5.8mm, males have significantly longer chelicerae compared to females. While males of other Cambridgea species possess a stridulatory organ on the dorsal surface of the pedicel and abdomen, it is absent in male C. foliata.

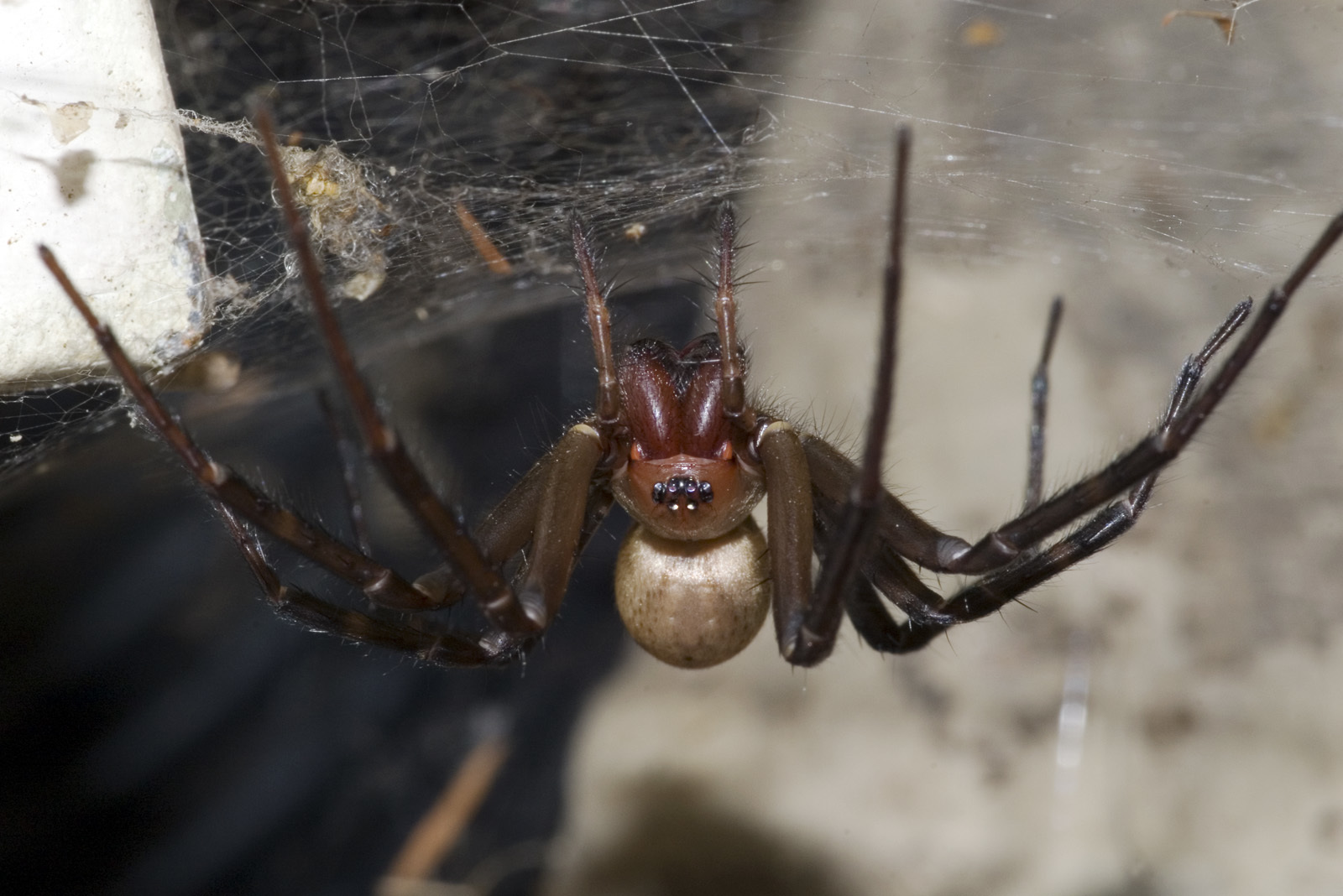

== Distribution ==
This species is only known from the North Island and the north end of the South Island of New Zealand.

== Contest behaviour ==
In the summer season, mature males depart their natal webs in search of females, sometimes wandering into people's houses'. When they find a female's web, they will use their first pair of legs and chelicerae to defend the web and female from any other males which may intrude, with the largest males tending to be most successful at defending webs.

== Conservation status ==
Under the New Zealand Threat Classification System, this species is listed as "Not Threatened".
