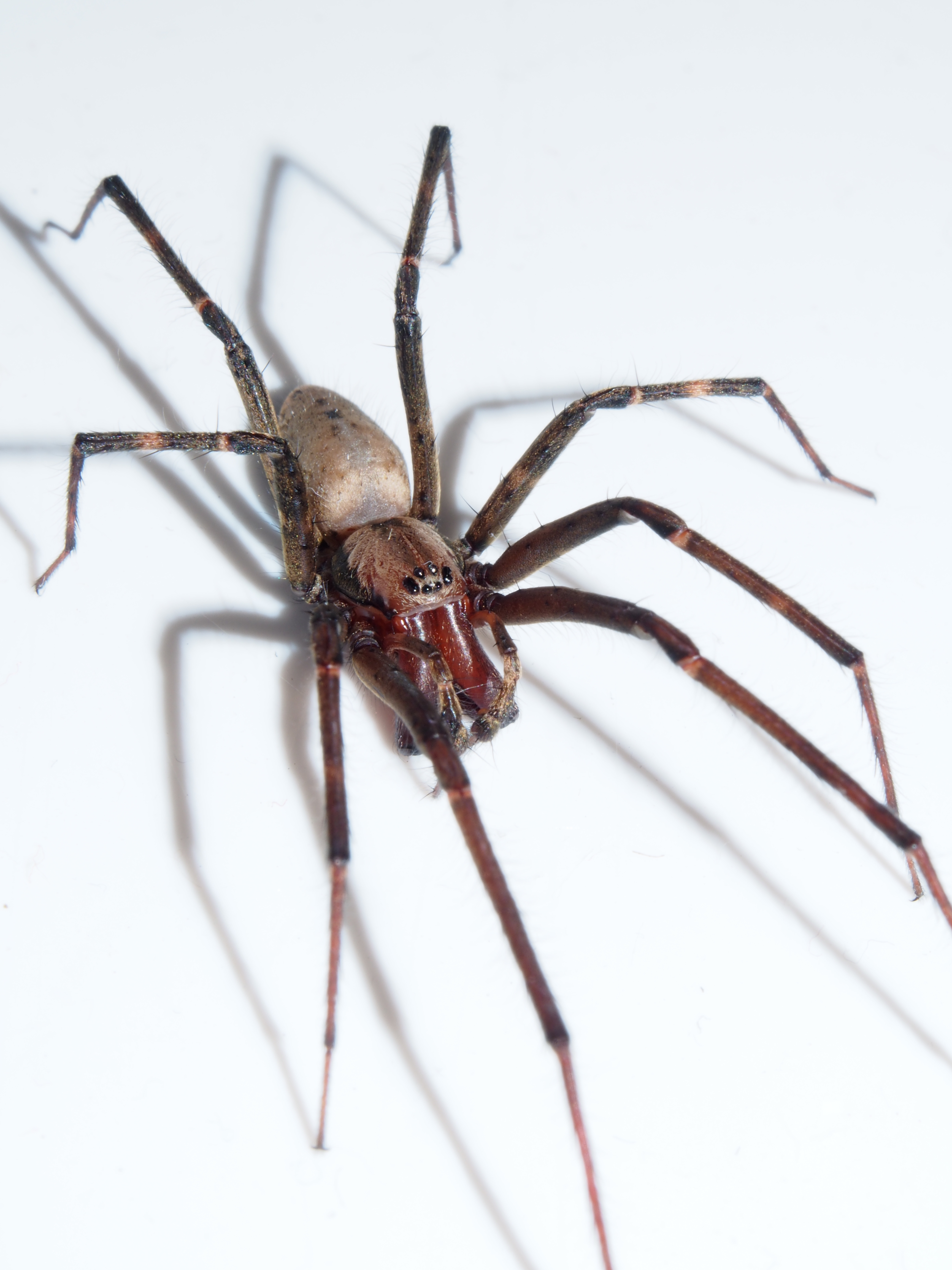
- Cambridgea foliata

Scientific classification
- Kingdom: Animalia
- Phylum: Arthropoda
- Subphylum: Chelicerata
- Class: Arachnida
- Order: Araneae
- Infraorder: Araneomorphae
- Family: Desidae
- Genus: Cambridgea; L. Koch, 1872

Species
- See text.

= Cambridgea =

Genus of spiders

Cambridgea (common name New Zealand sheetweb spider, bush spider) is a spider genus in the family Desidae and some of the first endemic spiders described from New Zealand. They are known for constructing large horizontal sheet webs measuring up to a square metre in larger species. Cambridgea were originally assigned to the Agelenidae by Dalmas in 1917 but were reassigned to the Stiphidiidae in 1973. Most recently, both Cambridgea and sister genus Nanocambridgea were reassigned to the Desidae, subfamily Porteriinae on the basis of molecular evidence.

== Description ==
Cambridgea are medium to large arboreal spiders, with body lengths ranging from approximately 6-10mm in the case of Cambridgea reinga to about 20mm in the case of Cambridgea foliata. They have long legs and porrect chelicerae which are significantly longer in adult males compared to adult females. Male pedipalps are characterised by a cymbium that extends well beyond the bulb and species can be differentiated by the morphology of the male tibial apophyses and female epigyne.

== Behaviour ==
=== Male-male competition ===
In the summer, following maturation, adult males depart their natal webs at night and wander in search of receptive females. During this time males will frequently wander into homes, sometimes getting stuck in bathtubs. Having found a female's web, males will defend the web and fight any rival males that subsequently arrive in her web. Fights proceed through clear stages of escalation. In some species males will first signal to each other by creating distortions in the mainsheet by shaking their bodies or by drumming their first pairs of legs and pedipalps on the web. Unless one male withdraws from the web, these contests will escalate to sparring, in which males push at each other with their first two pairs of legs. Some fights will escalate further into grappling in which males lock their chelicerae together and push against one another. Fights rarely result in injury.

=== Web building ===
Cambridgea are known for building characteristic, three-dimensional sheet webs consisting of a thick, horizontal mainsheet guyed from below with anchoring threads and with a large number of knock-down threads above the mainsheet to intercept flying insects. The "rear" of the web attaches to a silken retreat which extends a short distance into crevices. The size of webs can vary significantly. Some species build sheet webs with mainsheets of up to one square metre, while some species (e.g. Cambridgea quadromaculata) do not build webs at all. Those Cambridgea that do build webs run along the underside of the mainsheet rather than along the top as some sheet-web spiders do (e.g. Corasoides).

== Species ==
As of May 2018, the World Spider Catalog accepted the following species.

- Cambridgea agrestis Forster & Wilton, 1973 — New Zealand
- Cambridgea ambigua Blest & Vink, 2000 — New Zealand
- Cambridgea annulata Dalmas, 1917 — Chatham Islands
- Cambridgea antipodiana (White, 1849) — New Zealand
- Cambridgea arboricola (Urquhart, 1891) — New Zealand
- Cambridgea australis Blest & Vink, 2000 — New Zealand
- Cambridgea decorata Blest & Vink, 2000 — New Zealand
- Cambridgea elegans Blest & Vink, 2000 — New Zealand
- Cambridgea elongata Blest & Vink, 2000 — New Zealand
- Cambridgea fasciata L. Koch, 1872 — New Zealand
- Cambridgea foliata (L. Koch, 1872) — New Zealand
- Cambridgea inaequalis Blest & Vink, 2000 — New Zealand
- Cambridgea insulana Blest & Vink, 2000 — New Zealand
- Cambridgea longipes Blest & Vink, 2000 — New Zealand
- Cambridgea mercurialis Blest & Vink, 2000 — New Zealand
- Cambridgea obscura Blest & Vink, 2000 — New Zealand
- Cambridgea occidentalis Forster & Wilton, 1973 — New Zealand
- Cambridgea ordishi Blest & Vink, 2000 — New Zealand
- Cambridgea pallidula Blest & Vink, 2000 — New Zealand
- Cambridgea peculiaris Forster & Wilton, 1973 — New Zealand
- Cambridgea peelensis Blest & Vink, 2000 — New Zealand
- Cambridgea plagiata Forster & Wilton, 1973 — New Zealand
- Cambridgea quadromaculata Blest & Taylor, 1995 — New Zealand
- Cambridgea ramsayi Forster & Wilton, 1973 — New Zealand
- Cambridgea reinga Forster & Wilton, 1973 — New Zealand
- Cambridgea secunda Forster & Wilton, 1973 — New Zealand
- Cambridgea simoni Berland, 1924 — New Caledonia
- Cambridgea solanderensis Blest & Vink, 2000 — New Zealand
- Cambridgea sylvatica Forster & Wilton, 1973 — New Zealand
- Cambridgea tuiae Blest & Vink, 2000 — New Zealand
- Cambridgea turbotti Forster & Wilton, 1973 — New Zealand
