= Cambridgea antipodiana =

Conservation status
- Not Threatened (NZ TCS)

Scientific classification
- Domain: Eukaryota
- Kingdom: Animalia
- Phylum: Arthropoda
- Subphylum: Chelicerata
- Class: Arachnida
- Order: Araneae
- Infraorder: Araneomorphae
- Family: Desidae
- Genus: Cambridgea
- Species: C. antipodiana

Binomial name
- Cambridgea antipodiana (White, 1849)

Synonyms
- Tegenaria antipodiana

Species of spider

Cambridgea antipodiana is a species of Desidae that is endemic to New Zealand.

== Taxonomy ==
This species was described as Tegenaria antipodiana by Adam White. It was transferred to the Cambridgea genus in 1898. The most recent revision was in 1973, although details about its taxonomy have been discussed in additional papers. The holotype is stored in the Natural History Museum of London.

== Description ==
The female is recorded at 17.3mm in length whereas the male is 13.1mm.

== Distribution ==
This species is widespread throughout New Zealand in Stewart Island and the South Island. It is also present in Wellington.

== Conservation status ==
Under the New Zealand Threat Classification System, this species is listed as "Not Threatened".
