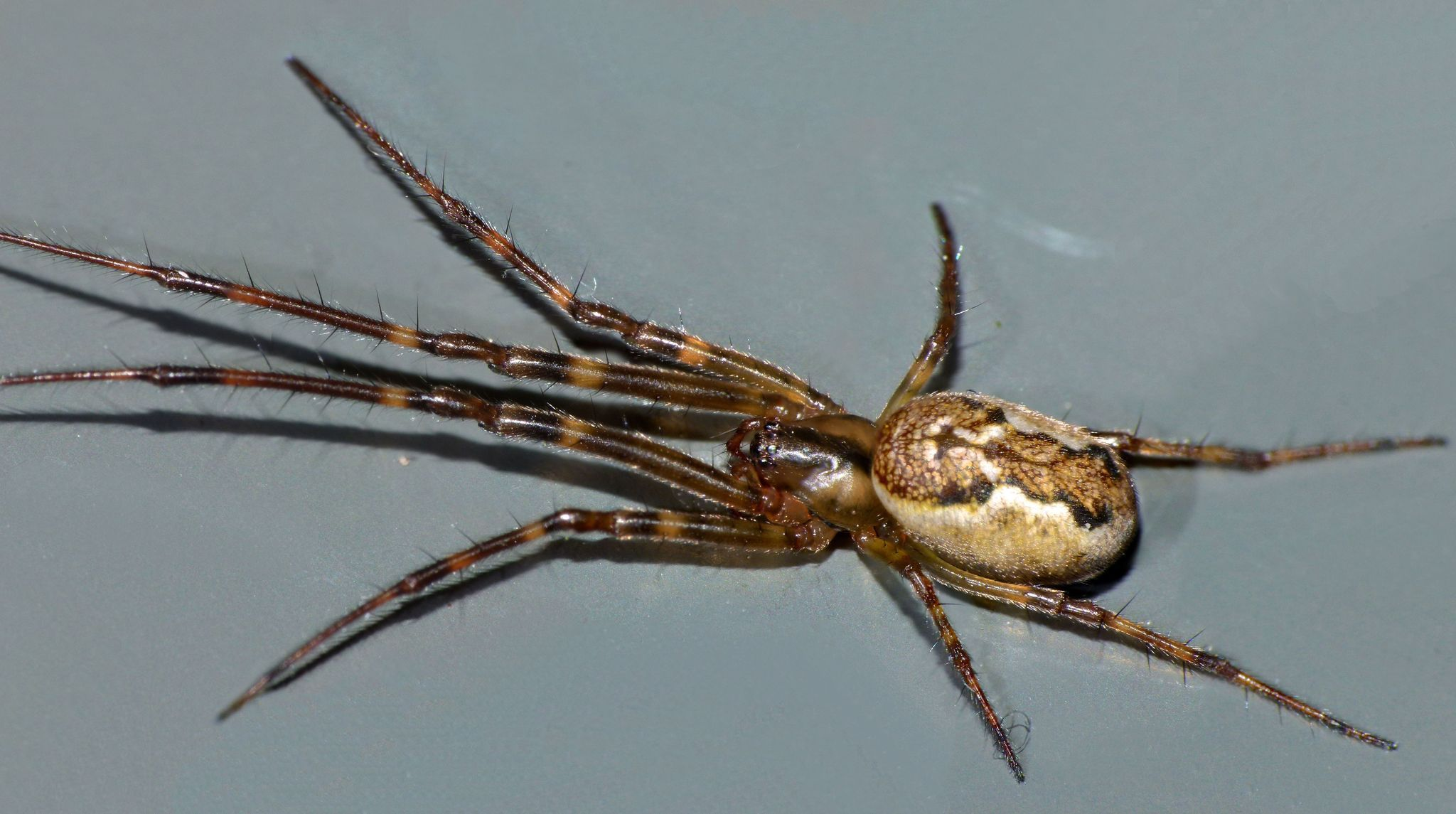

Conservation status
- Not Threatened (NZ TCS)

Scientific classification
- Domain: Eukaryota
- Kingdom: Animalia
- Phylum: Arthropoda
- Subphylum: Chelicerata
- Class: Arachnida
- Order: Araneae
- Infraorder: Araneomorphae
- Family: Tetragnathidae
- Genus: Nanometa
- Species: N. lagenifera

Binomial name
- Nanometa lagenifera (Urquhart, 1888)

Synonyms
- Linyphia lagenifera; Tetragnatha herbigrada; Orsinome australis; Orsinome herbigrada; Orsinome lagenifera

= Nanometa lagenifera =

Species of Arachnida

Nanometa lagenifera is a species of Tetragnathidae spider that is endemic to New Zealand.

== Taxonomy ==
This species was described as Linyphia lagenifera in 1888 by Arthur Urquhart from a female specimen collected in Otago. It was most recently revised in 2020, in which it was moved to the Nanometa genus. The holotype is stored in Senckenberg Museum.

== Description ==
The female is recorded at 8mm in length, whereas the male is recorded at 7.5mm. This species has a yellow cephalothorax with a dark brown pattern. The abdomen is grey with markings dorsally.

== Distribution ==
This species is widespread throughout New Zealand.

== Conservation status ==
Under the New Zealand Threat Classification System, this species is listed as "Not Threatened".
