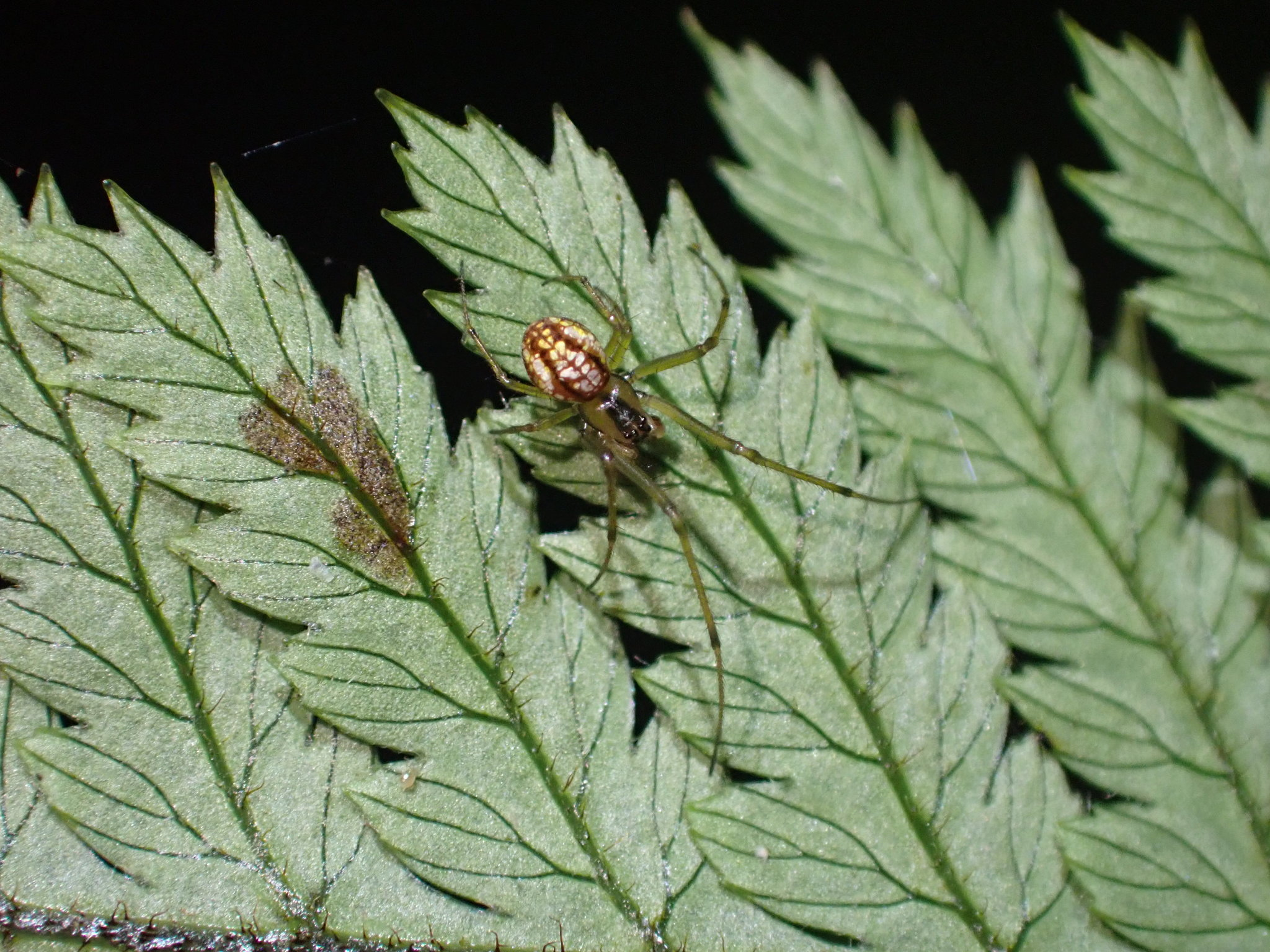
- Nanometa purpurapunctata found south of Palmerston North in the central North Island, New Zealand

Conservation status
- Not Threatened (NZ TCS)

Scientific classification
- Domain: Eukaryota
- Kingdom: Animalia
- Phylum: Arthropoda
- Subphylum: Chelicerata
- Class: Arachnida
- Order: Araneae
- Infraorder: Araneomorphae
- Family: Tetragnathidae
- Genus: Nanometa
- Species: N. purpurapunctata

Binomial name
- Nanometa purpurapunctata (Urquhart, 1889)

Synonyms
- Linyphia purpura-puncatata Urquhart, 1889; Linyphia nitidulum Urquhart, 1889; Erycina violacea Urquhart, 1891; Eryciniola purpura-punctata Bryant, 1933; Eryciniolia purpurapunctata Forster, 1980

= Nanometa purpurapunctata =

Species of spiders

Nanometa purpurapunctata is a species of spider in the family Tetragnathidae. It is found in New Zealand.

== Taxonomy ==
This species was described as Linyphia purpura-puncatata in 1889 by Arthur Urquhart from male and female specimens collected in Waiorongomai Valley, Te Aroha. It was most recently revised in 2020, in which it was moved to the Nanometa genus. The syntype is stored in Canterbury Museum.

== Description ==
The female is recorded at 3.7mm in length whereas the male is 2.7mm.

== Distribution ==
This species is only known from the North Island of New Zealand.

== Conservation status ==
Under the New Zealand Threat Classification System, this species is listed as "Not Threatened".
