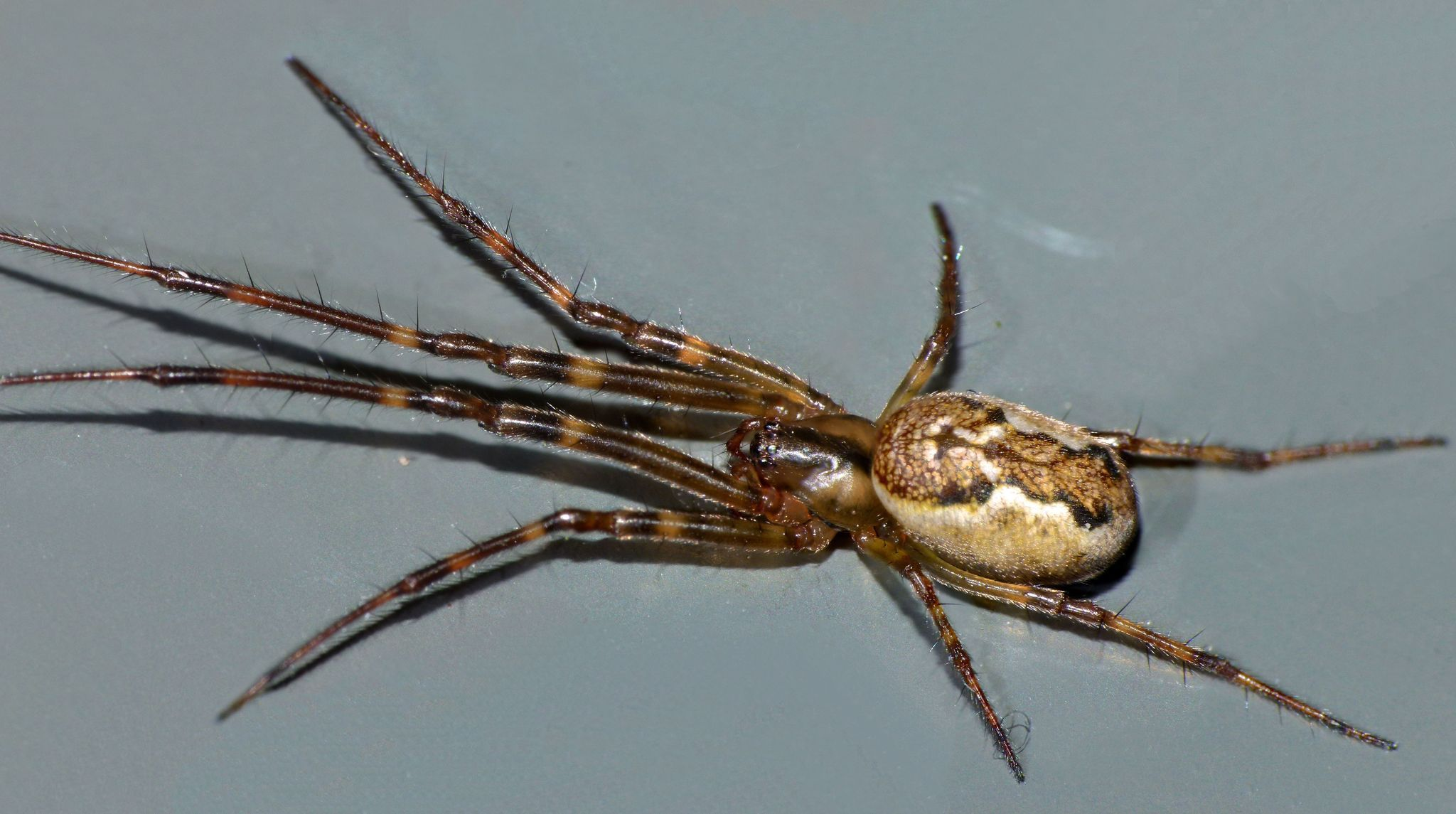
- Nanometa lagenifera

Scientific classification
- Kingdom: Animalia
- Phylum: Arthropoda
- Subphylum: Chelicerata
- Class: Arachnida
- Order: Araneae
- Infraorder: Araneomorphae
- Family: Tetragnathidae
- Genus: Nanometa; Simon, 1908

Synonyms
- Eryciniolia Strand, 1912; Nediphya Marusik & Omelko, 2017

= Nanometa =

Genus of spiders

Nanometa is a genus of long-jawed orb-weavers containing the fifteen species. It was erected by Eugène Louis Simon based on the type specimen of Nanometa gentilis found in 1908. It is included in a clade of its own defined by nine morphological synapomorphies, along with the genus Orsinome.

== Species ==
The following species are recognised in the genus :

- Nanometa dimitrovi Álvarez-Padilla, Kallal & Hormiga, 2020 — Australia (Queensland)
- Nanometa dutrorum Álvarez-Padilla, Kallal & Hormiga, 2020 — Australia (Tasmania)
- Nanometa fea Álvarez-Padilla, Kallal & Hormiga, 2020 — Papua New Guinea
- Nanometa forsteri Álvarez-Padilla, Kallal & Hormiga, 2020 — New Zealand
- Nanometa gentilis Simon, 1908 (type) — Australia (Western Australia)
- Nanometa hippai (Marusik & Omelko, 2017) — Papua New Guinea
- Nanometa lagenifera (Urquhart, 1888) — New Zealand
- Nanometa lehtineni (Marusik & Omelko, 2017) — Papua New Guinea
- Nanometa lyleae (Marusik & Omelko, 2017) — Papua New Guinea
- Nanometa padillai (Marusik & Omelko, 2017) — Papua New Guinea
- Nanometa purpurapunctata (Urquhart, 1889) — New Zealand
- Nanometa sarasini (Berland, 1924) — New Caledonia
- Nanometa tasmaniensis Álvarez-Padilla, Kallal & Hormiga, 2020 — Australia (Tasmania)
- Nanometa tetracaena Álvarez-Padilla, Kallal & Hormiga, 2020 — Australia (Victoria, New South Wales, Tasmania)
- Nanometa trivittata (Keyserling, 1887) — Australia (Queensland, New South Wales, Victoria)

== See also ==
- Orsinome
