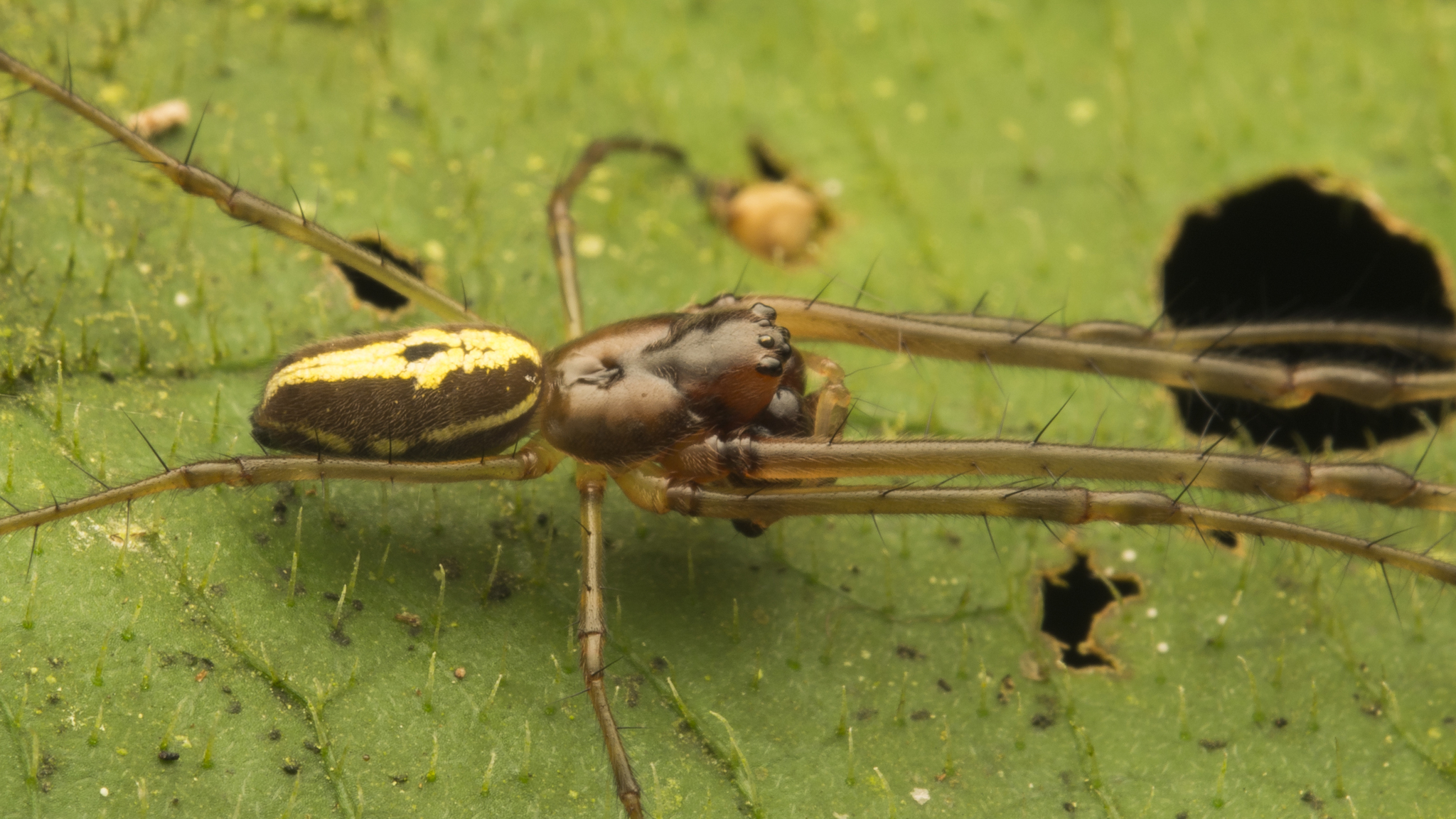
- Orsinome vethi

Scientific classification
- Kingdom: Animalia
- Phylum: Arthropoda
- Subphylum: Chelicerata
- Class: Arachnida
- Order: Araneae
- Infraorder: Araneomorphae
- Family: Tetragnathidae
- Genus: Orsinome; Thorell, 1890

Type species
- O. vethi (Hasselt, 1882)

Species
- 13, see text

= Orsinome =

Genus of spiders

Orsinome is a genus of long-jawed orb-weavers that was first described by Tamerlan Thorell in 1890. It is included in the Nanometa clade, defined by nine morphological synapomorphies, along with Eryciniolia and Nanometa.

== Species ==
As of March 2021 it contains thirteen species, found in Oceania, Asia, and on Madagascar:

- Orsinome armata Pocock, 1901 – India
- Orsinome cavernicola (Thorell, 1878) – Indonesia (Ambon)
- Orsinome daiqin Zhu, Song & Zhang, 2003 – China
- Orsinome diporusa Zhu, Song & Zhang, 2003 – China
- Orsinome elberti Strand, 1911 – Timor
- Orsinome jiarui Zhu, Song & Zhang, 2003 – China
- Orsinome lorentzi Kulczyński, 1911 – New Guinea
- Orsinome megaloverpa Hormiga & Kallal, 2018 – Philippines
- Orsinome monulfi Chrysanthus, 1971 – New Guinea
- Orsinome phrygiana Simon, 1901 – Malaysia
- Orsinome pilatrix (Thorell, 1878) – Indonesia (Ambon)
- Orsinome trappensis Schenkel, 1953 – China
- Orsinome vethi (Hasselt, 1882) (type) – India, China, Vietnam, Laos, Malaysia, Indonesia (Sumatra, Java, Flores)

In synonymy:

- O. listeri Gravely, 1921 = Orsinome vethi (Hasselt, 1882)
- O. nepula (Tikader, 1970) = Orsinome vethi (Hasselt, 1882)

== See also ==
- Eryciniolia
- Nanometa
