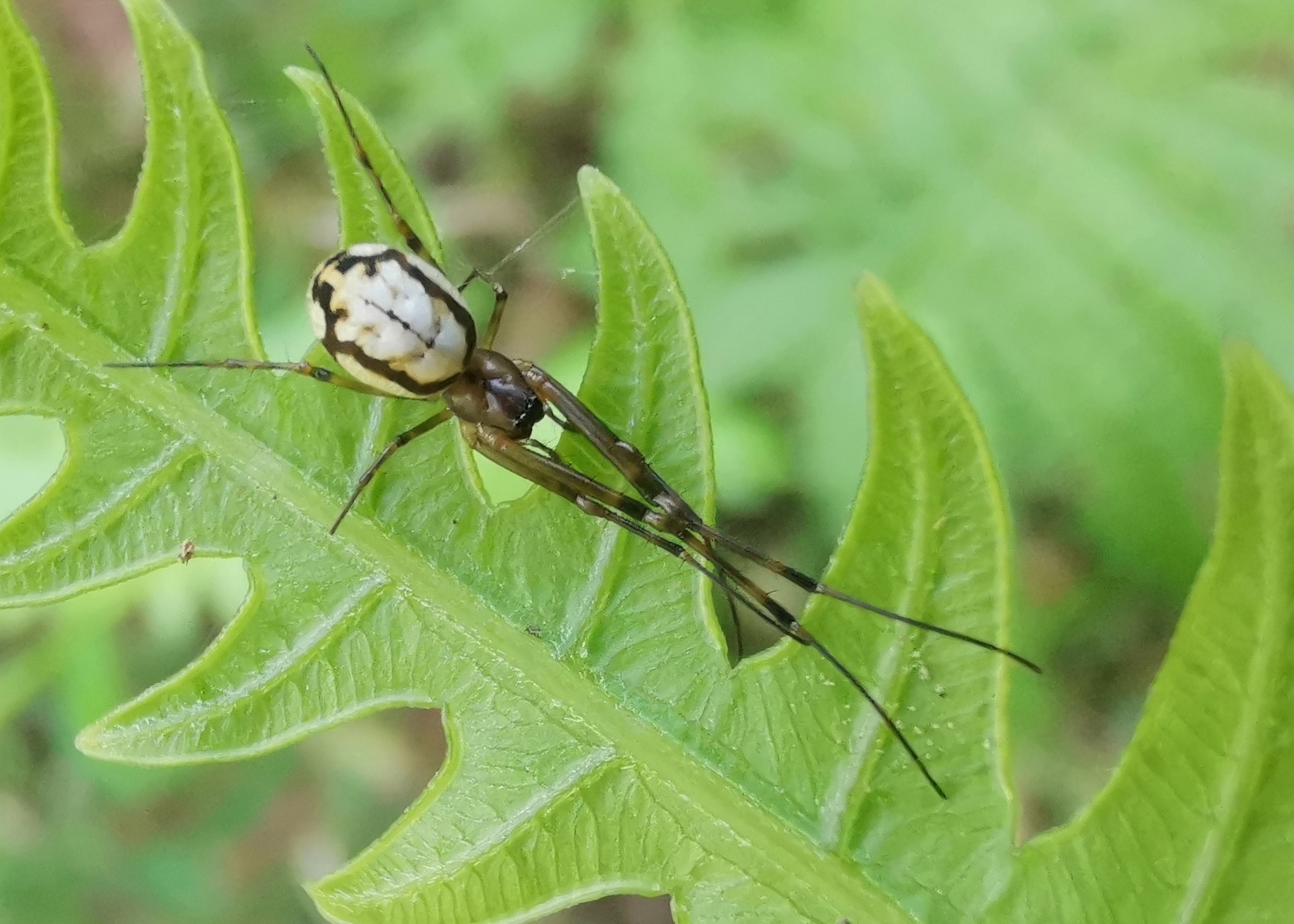
- Female from Thailand
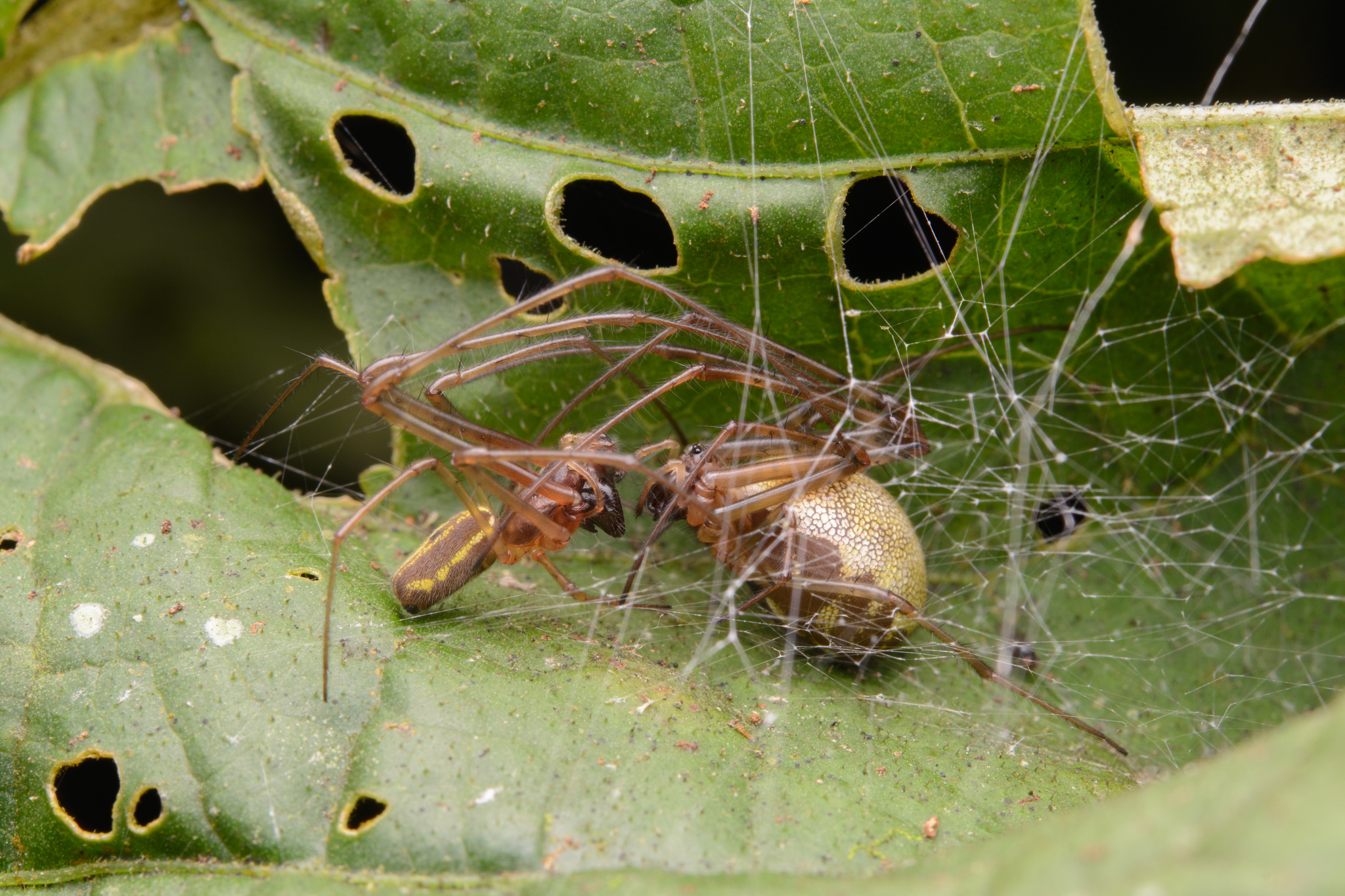
- Male and female from Indonesia

Scientific classification
- Kingdom: Animalia
- Phylum: Arthropoda
- Subphylum: Chelicerata
- Class: Arachnida
- Order: Araneae
- Infraorder: Araneomorphae
- Family: Tetragnathidae
- Genus: Orsinome
- Species: O. vethi

Binomial name
- Orsinome vethi (van Hasselt, 1882)

Synonyms
- Pachygnatha vethii van Hasselt, 1882; Orsinome listeri Gravely, 1921; Labulla nepula Tikader, 1970

= Orsinome vethi =

Species of spider

Orsinome vethi is a species of orb-weaver spider in the family Tetragnathidae. It has a wide distribution across Asia, being found in India, China, Vietnam, Laos, Malaysia, and Indonesia (including Sumatra, Java, and Flores).

== Taxonomy ==
The species was originally described as Pachygnatha vethii by van Hasselt in 1882 based on a male specimen from Sumatra. The female was later described by Thorell in 1890.

Two species were later synonymized with O. vethi: Orsinome listeri Gravely, 1921 and Labulla nepula Tikader, 1970, both based on morphological and phylogenetic studies.

== Etymology ==
The species is named in honor of P. J. Veth, who led the Dutch Sumatra expedition during which the type specimen was collected.

== Distribution ==
O. vethi has been recorded from a broad range across tropical and subtropical Asia. Records include locations in India, southern China, Vietnam, Laos, Malaysia, and several Indonesian islands including Sumatra, Java, and Flores.

== Description ==
O. vethi is a medium-sized orb-weaver with a body length of approximately 7-10 mm. The cephalothorax is testaceous (brownish-yellow) with three longitudinal black bands, with the central band being broader in the head region and narrower in the thoracic region.

The abdomen shows sexual dimorphism in coloration and pattern. In females, the abdomen is grayish with a distinctive black dorsal pattern that may be broken into spots or bands. The ventral surface typically shows two longitudinal yellow lines extending from the genital area to near the spinnerets.

Males are generally smaller and show different abdominal patterning, with the dorsal surface often appearing more uniformly colored. The male pedipalps are diagnostic for the species, with specific structural features of the cymbium and conductor that distinguish it from related species.
