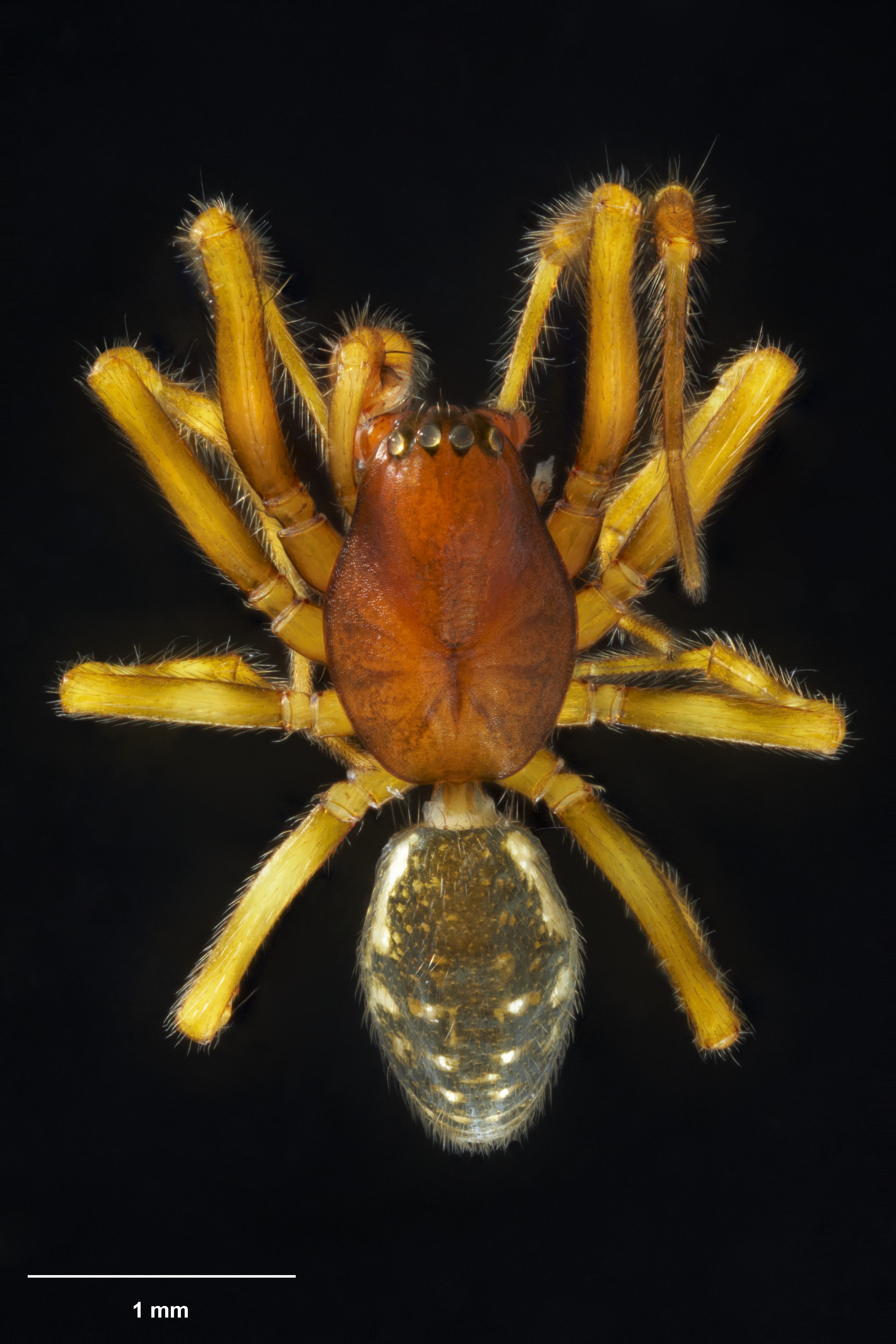

Conservation status
- Data Deficient (NZ TCS)

Scientific classification
- Domain: Eukaryota
- Kingdom: Animalia
- Phylum: Arthropoda
- Subphylum: Chelicerata
- Class: Arachnida
- Order: Araneae
- Infraorder: Araneomorphae
- Family: Linyphiidae
- Genus: Metamynoglenes
- Species: M. absurda

Binomial name
- Metamynoglenes absurda Blest & Vink, 2002

= Metamynoglenes absurda =

Species of spider

Metamynoglenes absurda is a species of sheet weaver spider endemic to New Zealand.

== Taxonomy ==
This species was described in 2002 by A.D Blest and Cor Vink from male and female specimens. This species is stored in Te Papa Museum under registration number AS.000235.

== Description ==
The male is recorded at 2.38mm in length whereas the female is 3.63mm. The male has a dark brown prosoma and brown legs. The abdomen is black with white spots dorsally.

== Distribution ==
This species is only known from Auckland, New Zealand.

== Conservation status ==
Under the New Zealand Threat Classification System, this species is listed as "Data Deficient" with the qualifiers of "Data Poor: Size" and "Data Poor: Trend".
