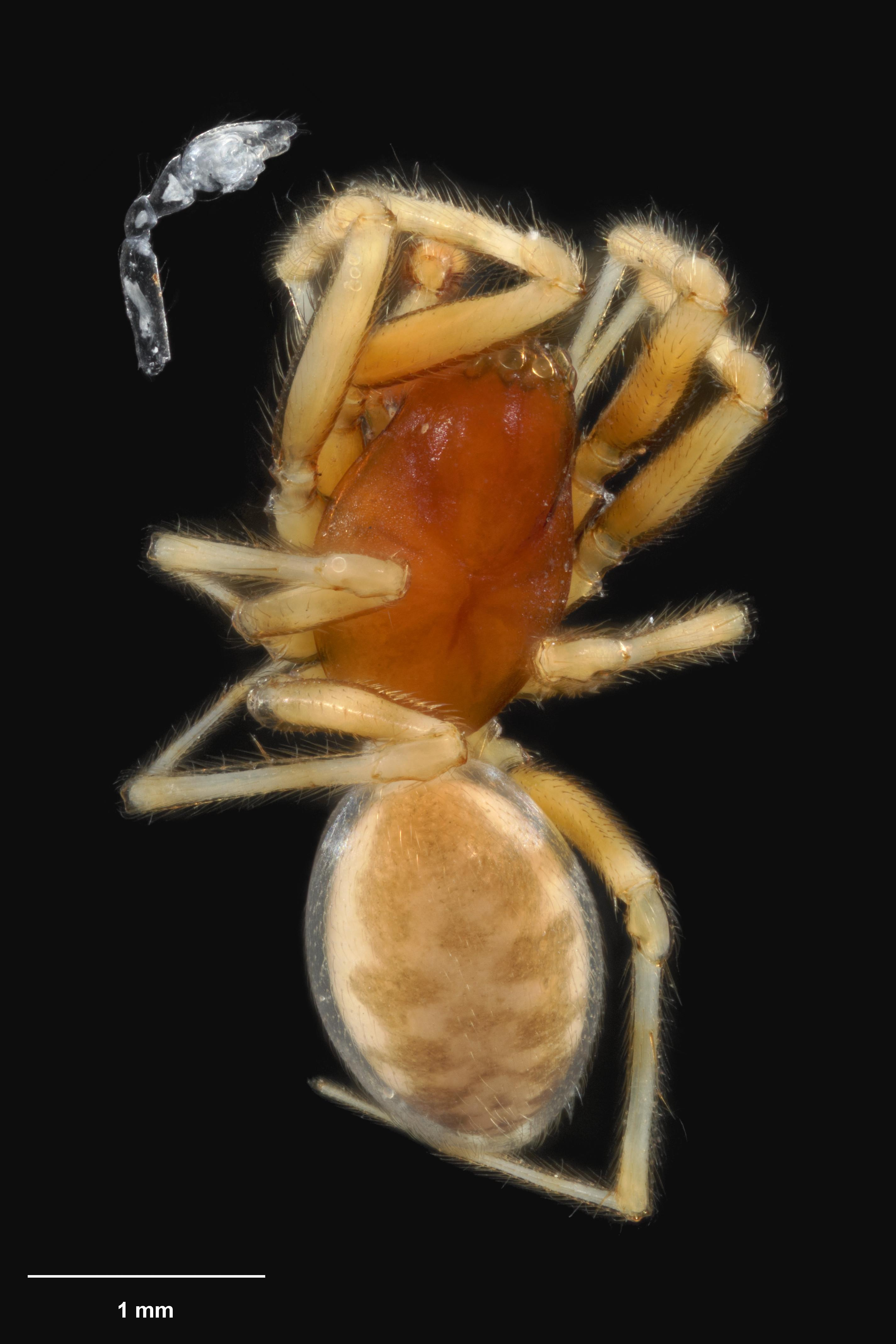

Conservation status
- Data Deficient (NZ TCS)

Scientific classification
- Domain: Eukaryota
- Kingdom: Animalia
- Phylum: Arthropoda
- Subphylum: Chelicerata
- Class: Arachnida
- Order: Araneae
- Infraorder: Araneomorphae
- Family: Linyphiidae
- Genus: Metamynoglenes
- Species: M. incurvata

Binomial name
- Metamynoglenes incurvata Blest, 1979

= Metamynoglenes incurvata =

Species of spider

Metamynoglenes incurvata is a species of sheet weaver spider endemic to New Zealand.

== Taxonomy ==
This species was described in 1979 by A.D Blest from male and female specimens. It is the type specimen of the Metamynoglenes genus. The holotype is stored in Te Papa Museum under registration number AS.000050.

== Description ==
The male is recorded at 4.16mm in length whereas the female is 4.08mm. This species has a dark brown cephalothorax, dark brown legs and a grey abdomen that has pale blotches dorsally.

== Distribution ==
This species is only known from Nelson, New Zealand.

== Conservation status ==
Under the New Zealand Threat Classification System, this species is listed as "Data Deficient" with the qualifiers of "Data Poor: Size" and "Data Poor: Trend".
