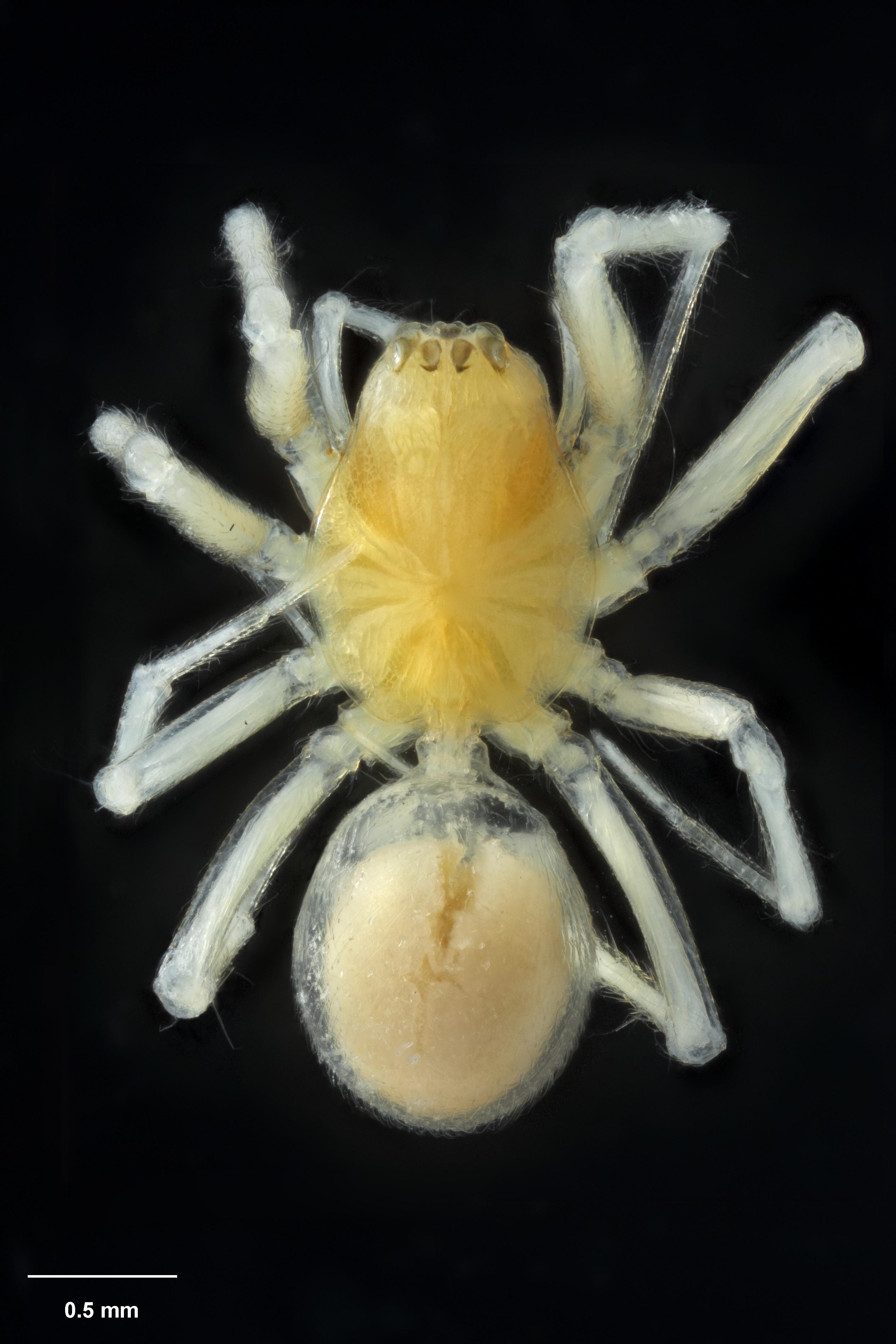

Conservation status
- Not Threatened (NZ TCS)

Scientific classification
- Domain: Eukaryota
- Kingdom: Animalia
- Phylum: Arthropoda
- Subphylum: Chelicerata
- Class: Arachnida
- Order: Araneae
- Infraorder: Araneomorphae
- Family: Linyphiidae
- Genus: Metamynoglenes
- Species: M. helicoides

Binomial name
- Metamynoglenes helicoides Blest, 1979

= Metamynoglenes helicoides =

Species of spider

Metamynoglenes helicoides is a species of sheet weaver spider endemic to New Zealand.

== Taxonomy ==
This species was described in 1979 by A.D Blest from a female specimen. In 2002, the male was described. The holotype is stored in Te Papa Museum under registration number AS.000037.

== Description ==
The female is recorded at 2.8mm in length whereas the male is 2.63mm. The female has a pale yellow cephalothorax and legs. The abdomen is pale grey. The male has a light brown prosoma, pale brown legs and a dark grey abdomen.

== Distribution ==
This species is only known from the North Island of New Zealand.

== Conservation status ==
Under the New Zealand Threat Classification System, this species is listed as "Not Threatened".
