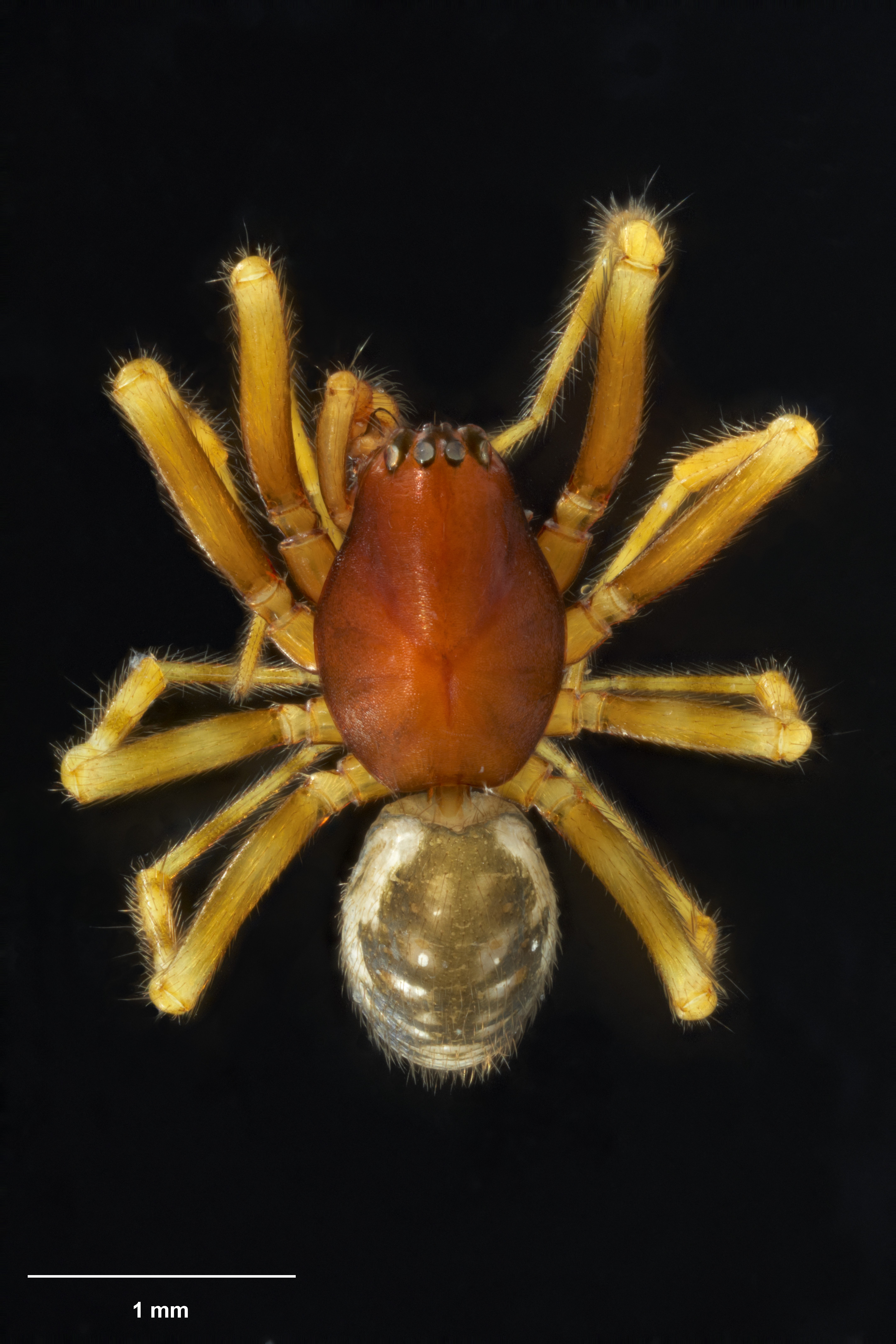
- Metamynoglenes ngongotaha

Scientific classification
- Kingdom: Animalia
- Phylum: Arthropoda
- Subphylum: Chelicerata
- Class: Arachnida
- Order: Araneae
- Infraorder: Araneomorphae
- Family: Linyphiidae
- Genus: Metamynoglenes; Blest, 1979

Type species
- M. incurvata Blest, 1979

Species
- 8, see text

= Metamynoglenes =

Genus of spiders

Metamynoglenes is a genus of South Pacific dwarf spiders that was first described by A. D. Blest in 1979.

== Species ==
As of May 2019 it contains eight species:

- Metamynoglenes absurda Blest & Vink, 2002 – New Zealand
- Metamynoglenes attenuata Blest, 1979 – New Zealand
- Metamynoglenes flagellata Blest, 1979 – New Zealand
- Metamynoglenes gracilis Blest, 1979 – New Zealand
- Metamynoglenes helicoides Blest, 1979 – New Zealand
- Metamynoglenes incurvata Blest, 1979 (type) – New Zealand
- Metamynoglenes magna Blest, 1979 – New Zealand
- Metamynoglenes ngongotaha Blest & Vink, 2002 – New Zealand
