= Metamynoglenes gracilis =

Conservation status
- Naturally Uncommon (NZ TCS)

Scientific classification
- Domain: Eukaryota
- Kingdom: Animalia
- Phylum: Arthropoda
- Subphylum: Chelicerata
- Class: Arachnida
- Order: Araneae
- Infraorder: Araneomorphae
- Family: Linyphiidae
- Genus: Metamynoglenes
- Species: M. gracilis

Binomial name
- Metamynoglenes gracilis Blest, 1979

Species of spider

Metamynoglenes gracilis is a species of sheet weaver spider endemic to New Zealand.

== Taxonomy ==
This species was described in 1979 by A.D Blest from a female specimen. In 2002, the male was described. The holotype is stored in Otago Museum.

== Description ==
The female is recorded at 2.72mm in length whereas the male is 2.5mm. The female has a dusky brown cephalothorax and legs. The abdomen has pale markings dorsally. In contrast, the male has a dark brown cephalothorax and brown legs.

== Distribution ==
This species is only known from Nelson, New Zealand.

== Conservation status ==
Under the New Zealand Threat Classification System, this species is listed as "Naturally Uncommon" with the qualifier of "Range Restricted".
