= Metamynoglenes attenuata =

Conservation status
- Not Threatened (NZ TCS)

Scientific classification
- Domain: Eukaryota
- Kingdom: Animalia
- Phylum: Arthropoda
- Subphylum: Chelicerata
- Class: Arachnida
- Order: Araneae
- Infraorder: Araneomorphae
- Family: Linyphiidae
- Genus: Metamynoglenes
- Species: M. attenuata

Binomial name
- Metamynoglenes attenuata Blest, 1979

Species of spider

Metamynoglenes attenuata is a species of sheet weaver spider endemic to New Zealand.

== Taxonomy ==
This species was described in 1979 by A.D Blest from male and female specimens. The holotype is stored in Otago Museum.

== Description ==
The male is recorded at 2.76mm in length whereas the female is 3.84mm. This species has a yellow brown cephalothorax and legs. The abdomen is grey with white markings dorsally.

== Distribution ==
This species is only known from Wellington and Nelson in New Zealand.

== Conservation status ==
Under the New Zealand Threat Classification System, this species is listed as "Not Threatened".
