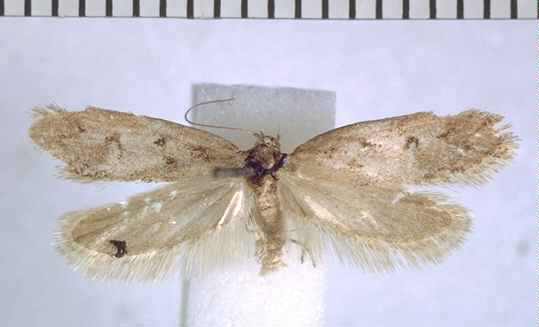
- Male holotype

Scientific classification
- Kingdom: Animalia
- Phylum: Arthropoda
- Class: Insecta
- Order: Lepidoptera
- Family: Oecophoridae
- Genus: Tingena
- Species: T. honesta

Binomial name
- Tingena honesta (Philpott, 1929)

Synonyms
- Borkhausenia honesta Philpott, 1929

= Tingena honesta =

Species of moth, endemic to New Zealand

Tingena honesta is a species of moth in the family Oecophoridae. It is endemic to New Zealand and can be found in the South Island.

== Taxonomy ==
This species was first described by Alfred Philpott using specimens collected at Lake Tekapo and Lake Pukaki in December and named Borkhausenia honesta. In 1939 George Hudson discussed and illustrated this species in his book A supplement to the butterflies and moths of New Zealand using the same name. In 1988 J. S. Dugdale placed this species in the genus Tingena. The male holotype specimen is held at the New Zealand Arthropod Collection.

== Description ==
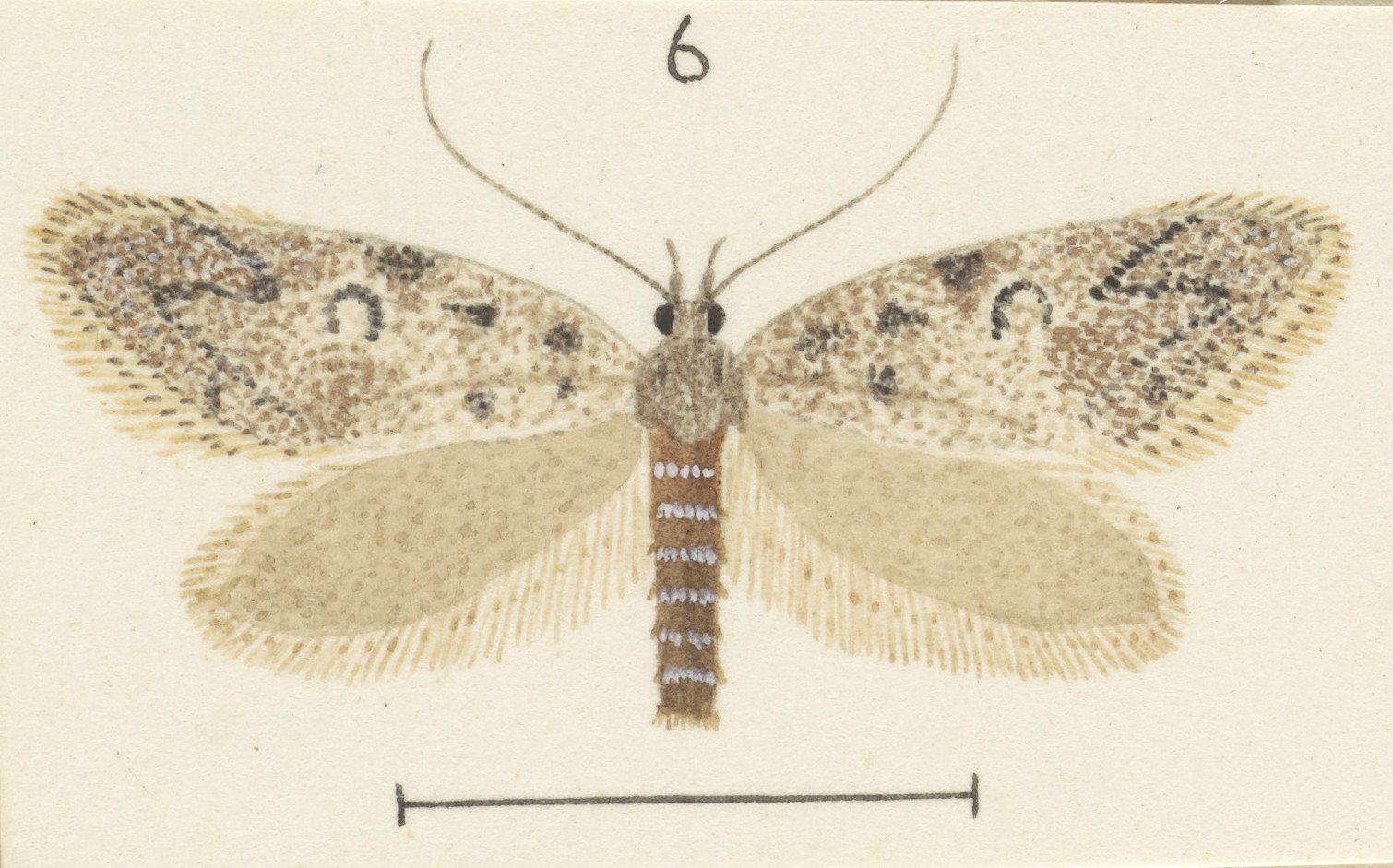
Illustration of T. honesta by George Hudson.

Philpott described this species as follows:

♂. 16–19 mm. Head and thorax grey. Palpi fuscous; terminal segment mixed with ochreous. Antennae fuscous, ciliations in ♂ 1¼. Abdomen grey. Legs ochreous, anterior pair fuscous with tarsi obscurely annulated with ochreous. Forewings moderate, costa moderately arched, apex round-pointed, termen very oblique; grey, strongly suffused with white in disc; markings blackish-fuscous; an obscure median blotch near base; 1st discal and plical round, plical obliquely before 1st discal; 2nd discal white-centred, open beneath; a thin subterminal line, deeply indented beneath costa; some blackish scales above tornus and round termen; fringes grey with some blackish scales. Hindwings fuscous-grey; fringes grey with two obscure darker lines.

This species is similar in appearance to T. ancogramma but is paler.

== Distribution ==
This species is endemic to New Zealand and has been observed in the South Island.

== Behaviour ==
The adult moths are on the wing in December.
