= Paranapis isolata =

Conservation status
- Naturally Uncommon (NZ TCS)

Scientific classification
- Kingdom: Animalia
- Phylum: Arthropoda
- Subphylum: Chelicerata
- Class: Arachnida
- Order: Araneae
- Infraorder: Araneomorphae
- Family: Anapidae
- Genus: Paranapis
- Species: P. isolata

Binomial name
- Paranapis isolata Platnick & Forster, 1989

Species of spider

Paranapis isolata is a species of Anapidae that is endemic to New Zealand.

== Taxonomy ==
This species was described in 1989 by Norman Platnick and Ray Forster from male and female specimens. The holotype is stored in the New Zealand Arthropod Collection under registration number NZAC03014953.

== Description ==
The male is recorded at 1.10mm in length whereas the female is 1.35mm.

== Distribution ==
This species is only known from Three King Islands, New Zealand.

== Conservation status ==
Under the New Zealand Threat Classification System, this species is listed as "Naturally Uncommon" with the qualifiers of "Island Endemic" and "Range Restricted".
