= Maorineta mollis =

Conservation status
- Not Threatened (NZ TCS)

Scientific classification
- Domain: Eukaryota
- Kingdom: Animalia
- Phylum: Arthropoda
- Subphylum: Chelicerata
- Class: Arachnida
- Order: Araneae
- Infraorder: Araneomorphae
- Family: Linyphiidae
- Genus: Maorineta
- Species: M. mollis

Binomial name
- Maorineta mollis Millidge, 1988

Species of spider

Maorineta mollis is a species of sheet weaver spider endemic to New Zealand.

== Taxonomy ==
This species was described in 1988 by Alfred Frank Millidge from female and male specimens. The holotype is stored in the New Zealand Arthropod Collection under registration number NZAC03014981.

== Description ==
The female is recorded at 1.55-1.80mm in length whereas the male is 1.35-1.80mm. This species has a yellow brown to orange carapace with blackish markings. The legs are yellow to orange brown. The abdomen is grey to black with a white patch dorsally.

== Distribution ==
This species is widespread in New Zealand.

== Conservation status ==
Under the New Zealand Threat Classification System, this species is listed as "Not Threatened".
