= Maorineta minor =

Conservation status
- Not Threatened (NZ TCS)

Scientific classification
- Kingdom: Animalia
- Phylum: Arthropoda
- Subphylum: Chelicerata
- Class: Arachnida
- Order: Araneae
- Infraorder: Araneomorphae
- Family: Linyphiidae
- Genus: Maorineta
- Species: M. minor

Binomial name
- Maorineta minor Millidge, 1988

Species of spider

Maorineta minor is a species of sheet weaver spider endemic to New Zealand.

== Taxonomy ==
This species was described in 1988 by Alfred Frank Millidge from female and male specimens. The holotype is stored in the New Zealand Arthropod Collection under registration number NZAC03014980.

== Description ==
The female is recorded at 1.25-1.55mm in length whereas the male is 1.20-1.55mm. This species has a yellow to pale brown carapace, pale yellow to orange legs and a pale grey to grey abdomen.

== Distribution ==
This species is only known from the North Island of New Zealand.

== Conservation status ==
Under the New Zealand Threat Classification System, this species is listed as "Not Threatened".
