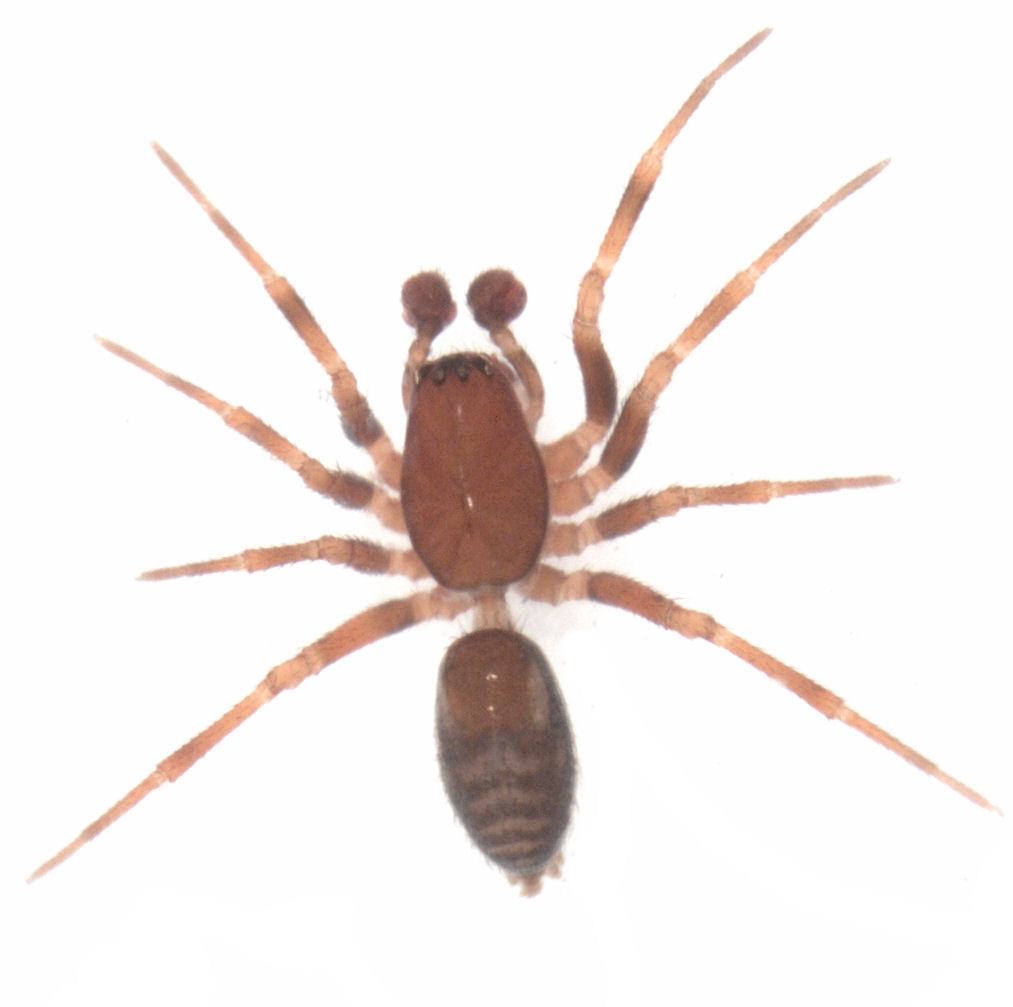

Conservation status
- Not Threatened (NZ TCS)

Scientific classification
- Domain: Eukaryota
- Kingdom: Animalia
- Phylum: Arthropoda
- Subphylum: Chelicerata
- Class: Arachnida
- Order: Araneae
- Infraorder: Araneomorphae
- Family: Linyphiidae
- Genus: Dunedinia
- Species: D. denticulata

Binomial name
- Dunedinia denticulata Millidge, 1988

= Dunedinia denticulata =

Species of Arachnida

Dunedinia denticulata is a species of Linyphiidae spider that is endemic to New Zealand.

== Taxonomy ==
This species was described in 1988 by Alfred Frank Millidge from female and male specimens. The holotype is stored in the New Zealand Arthropod Collection under registration number NZAC03014970.

== Description ==
The female is recorded at 1.75-1.90mm in length whereas the male is 1.6-2.0mm. This species has a pale brown to brown carapace, brown legs with dark bands. The abdomen is grey to black with a chevron pattern dorsally.

== Distribution ==
This species is known from throughout New Zealand, including Three Kings Islands.

== Conservation status ==
Under the New Zealand Threat Classification System, this species is listed as "Not Threatened".
