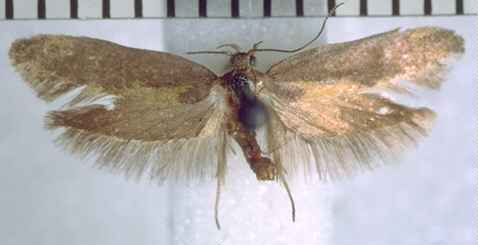
- Male holotype

Scientific classification
- Kingdom: Animalia
- Phylum: Arthropoda
- Class: Insecta
- Order: Lepidoptera
- Family: Oecophoridae
- Genus: Tingena
- Species: T. affinis

Binomial name
- Tingena affinis (Philpott, 1926)

Synonyms
- Borkhausenia affinis Philpott, 1926

= Tingena affinis =

Species of moth, endemic to New Zealand

Tingena affinis is a species of moth in the family Oecophoridae. It is endemic to New Zealand and has been found in the Nelson region. Adults are on the wing in December and January.

== Taxonomy ==
This species was described by Alfred Philpott in 1926 using specimens collected in Nelson in December and at Dun Mountain in January. Philpott originally named the species Borkhausenia affinis. Philpott illustrated the male genitalia of this species but this illustration is virtually identical to his illustration of the male genitalia of the species now known as Tingena xanthomicta. George Hudson discussed and illustrated this species under the name B. affinis in his 1928 publication The butterflies and moths of New Zealand. In 1988 J. S. Dugdale placed this species within the genus Tingena. The male holotype specimen, collected in Nelson, is held at the New Zealand Arthropod Collection.

== Description ==
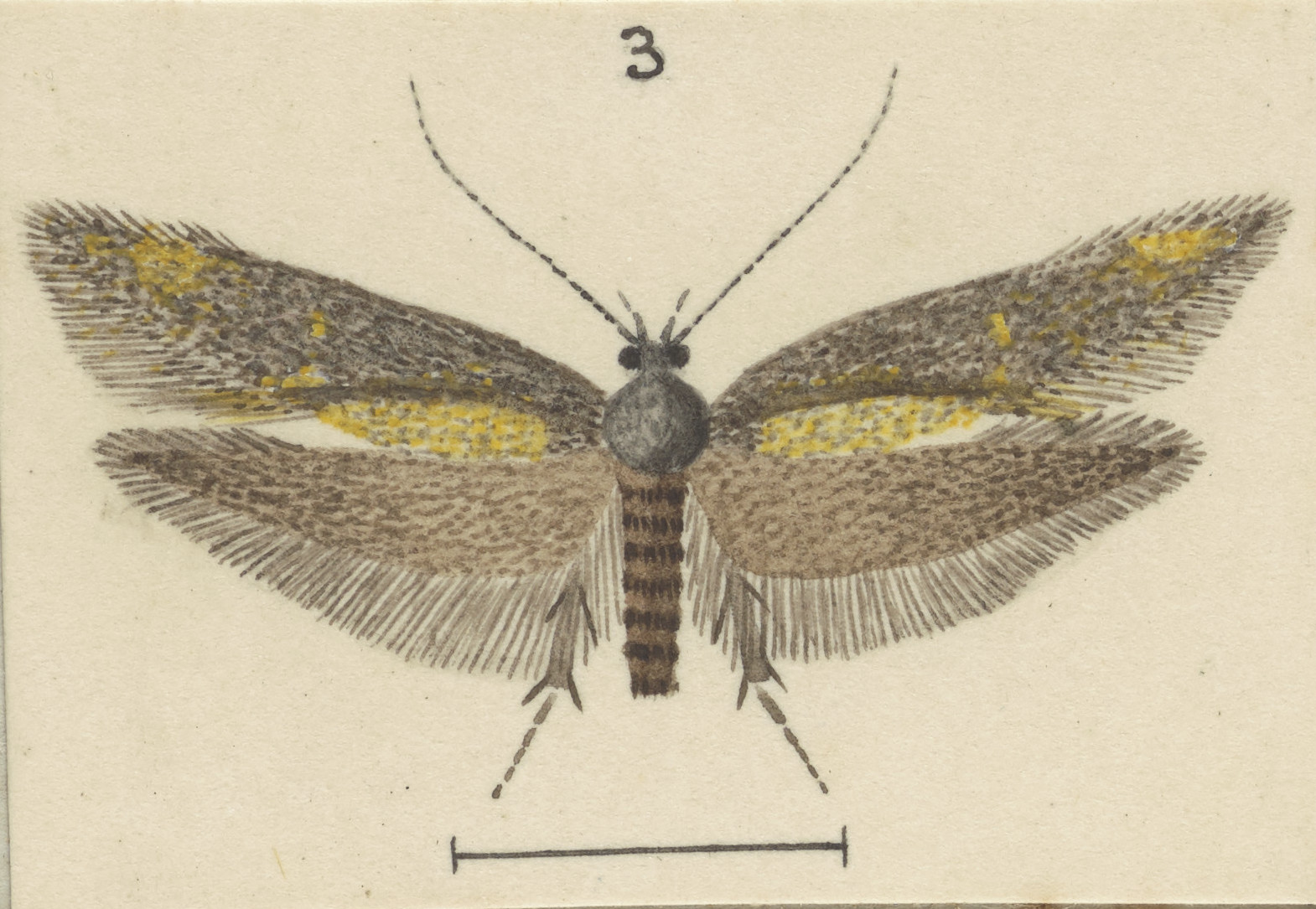
Illustration ofT. affinis by George Hudson.

Philpott described the species as follows:

♂. 13–14 mm. Head, palpi, and thorax bronzy-brown mixed with grey. Antennae brown, narrowly annulated with ochreous, ciliations in male ¾. Abdomen bronzy-brown. Legs brown mixed with grey. Forewings elongate, narrow, not posteriorly dilated, costa slightly arched, sinuate at middle, apex pointed, termen extremely oblique; bronzy-brown; space below fold from near base almost to tornus occupied by a clear yellow stripe; a few yellow scales indicating post-median and pre-apical fasciae: fringes grey with scattered fuscous and yellow points. Hindwings broadly lanceolate; bronzy-fuscous: fringes fuscous with darker basal shade. Belongs to the siderodeta group; the practical absence of fasciae and the dorsal yellow stripe are good distinguishing characters. Nelson in December, and Dun Mountain in January. A single male from each locality.

== Distribution ==
This species is endemic to New Zealand. It has been found in the Nelson region.

== Behaviour ==
Adults of this species are on the wing in December and January.
