= Reinga grossa =

Conservation status
- Naturally Uncommon (NZ TCS)

Scientific classification
- Kingdom: Animalia
- Phylum: Arthropoda
- Subphylum: Chelicerata
- Class: Arachnida
- Order: Araneae
- Infraorder: Araneomorphae
- Family: Desidae
- Genus: Reinga
- Species: R. grossa

Binomial name
- Reinga grossa Forster & Wilton, 1973

Species of spider

Reinga grossa is a species of spider in the family Desidae that is endemic to New Zealand.

== Taxonomy ==
This species was described by Ray Forster and Cecil Wilton in 1973 from female specimens. The holotype is stored in the New Zealand Arthropod Collection under registration number NZAC03014951.

== Description ==
The female is recorded at 12.4mm in length. The carapace is coloured yellowish brown and has dark shading. The legs have dark bands. The abdomen is patterned dorsally.

== Distribution ==
This species is only known from Three Kings Islands, New Zealand.

== Conservation status ==
Under the New Zealand Threat Classification System, this species is listed as "Naturally Uncommon" with the qualifiers of "Island Endemic" and "Range Restricted".
