= Parafroneta subantarctica =

Conservation status
- Naturally Uncommon (NZ TCS)

Scientific classification
- Domain: Eukaryota
- Kingdom: Animalia
- Phylum: Arthropoda
- Subphylum: Chelicerata
- Class: Arachnida
- Order: Araneae
- Infraorder: Araneomorphae
- Family: Linyphiidae
- Genus: Parafroneta
- Species: P. subantarctica

Binomial name
- Parafroneta subantarctica Blest, 1979

Species of spider

Parafroneta subantarctica is a species of sheet weaver spider endemic to New Zealand.

== Taxonomy ==
This species was described in 1979 by A.D Blest from male and female specimens. The holotype is stored in the New Zealand Arthropod Collection under registration number NZAC03014982.

== Description ==
The male is recorded at 2.2mm in length whereas the female is 2.08mm. This species has an orange brown cephalothorax, yellow brown legs and a grey abdomen that has white markings.

== Distribution ==
This species is only known from Antipodes Island in New Zealand.

== Conservation status ==
Under the New Zealand Threat Classification System, this species is listed as "Naturally Uncommon" with the qualifiers of "Island Endemic" and " One Location".
