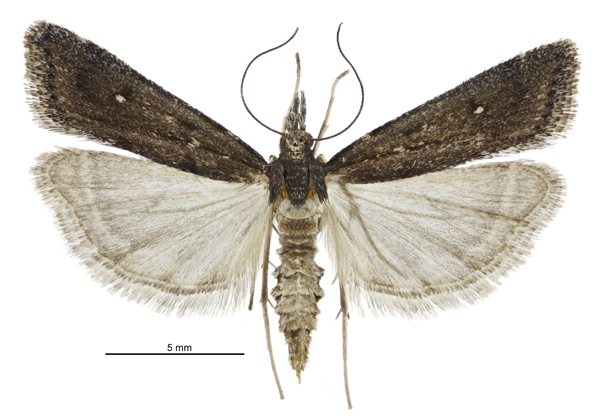
- Female
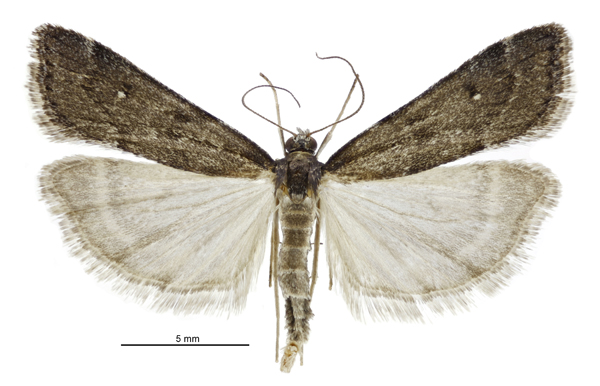
- Male

Scientific classification
- Kingdom: Animalia
- Phylum: Arthropoda
- Class: Insecta
- Order: Lepidoptera
- Family: Crambidae
- Genus: Eudonia
- Species: E. oculata

Binomial name
- Eudonia oculata (Philpott, 1927)

Synonyms
- Scoparia oculata Philpott, 1927

= Eudonia oculata =

Species of moth endemic to New Zealand

Eudonia oculata is a moth in the family Crambidae. It was described by Alfred Philpott in 1927. This species is endemic to New Zealand and is said to be found only in the South Island, however specimens have also been observed in the lower parts of the North Island and at Chatham Island. This species inhabits grass or shrub land as well as lowland to alpine tussock habitat. Adults are commonly on the wing from November until April and are attracted to light.

== Taxonomy ==
This species was first described by Alfred Philpott in 1927 and originally named Scoparia oculata. George Hudson discussed and illustrated this species in 1939 in his book A supplement to the butterflies and moths of New Zealand under this name. In 1988 John S. Dugdale placed this species in the genus Eudonia. The female holotype specimen, collected in Nelson, is held at the New Zealand Arthropod Collection.

== Description ==
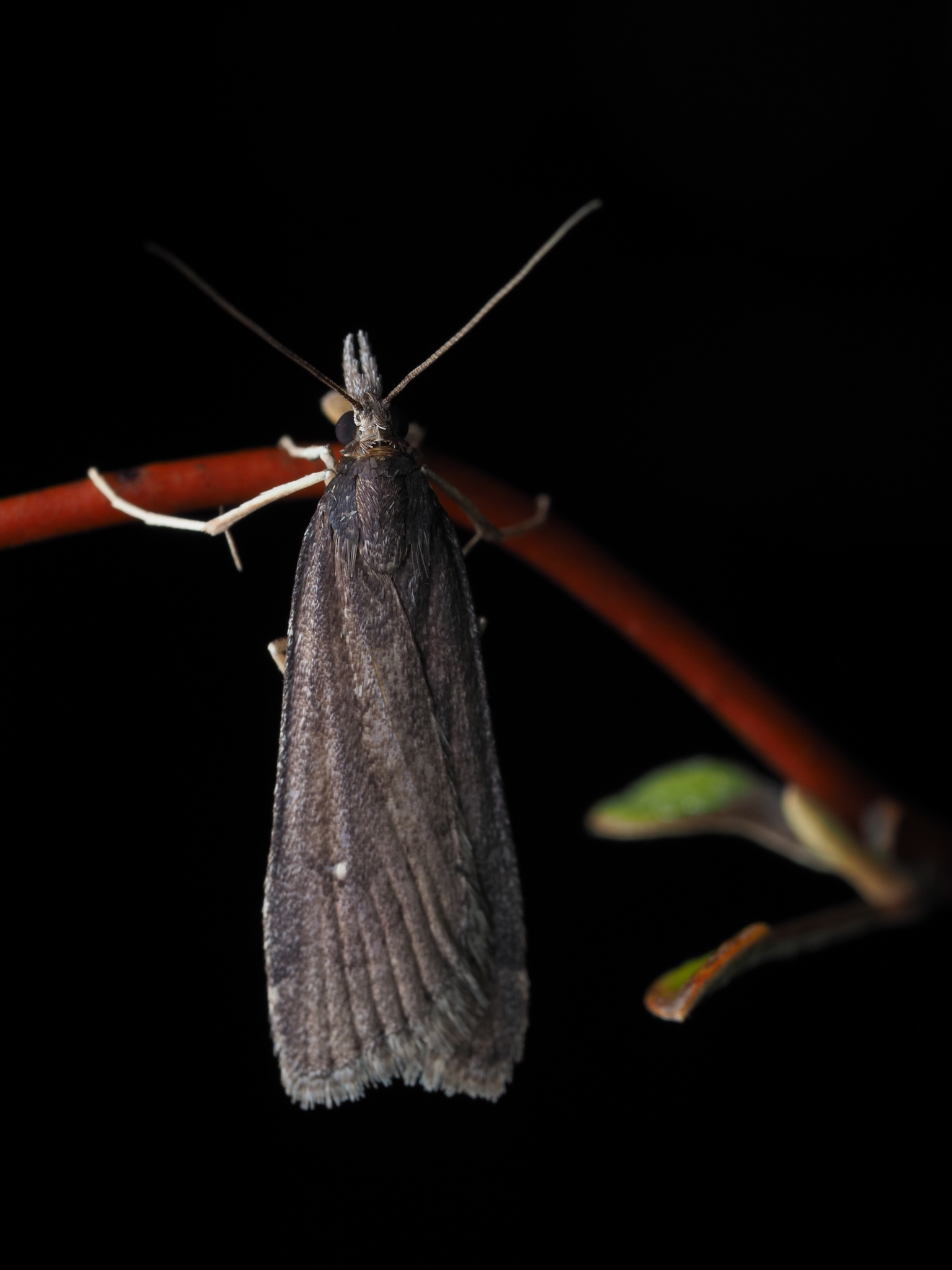
Living specimen of E. oculata.

Philpott described this species as follows:

♂ ♀. 19–22 mm.. Head and palpi brown mixed with white. Antennae brown, in male minutely ciliated. Thorax purplish-brown. Abdomen ochreous-grey. Legs ochreous-white, spurs brown. Forewings moderate, costa almost straight, apex rectangular, termen hardly rounded, oblique; dull purplish-brown; markings usually absent, except reniform which is blackish, and obscurely X-shaped, the lower half being filled with white; in some specimens the veins are faintly outlined in black and there is an obscure subterminal line; fringes greyish-brown with a darker basal line. Hindwings fuscous-grey; fringes greyish-white with brownish basal line.

This species is similar in appearance to Scoparia parca but can be distinguished as "the fore-wings are slightly narrower without sinuation in termen, slatey-grey strongly tinged with purple; all the markings are usually absent, except the reniform which is blackish, with the lower half white centred; there is no paler terminal area."

== Distribution ==
This species is endemic to New Zealand. This species is said to be only found in the South Island although specimens have been observed in the lower half of the North Island and the Chatham Island.

== Habitat and hosts ==
This species inhabits lowland to alpine tussock grassland or native grass or shrubland. The larval host plants of this species are likely moss or herbaceous swards. A report in 2021 indicated that the larval host of this species is moss.

== Behaviour ==
Adults are commonly on the wing from November to April. They are attracted to light.
