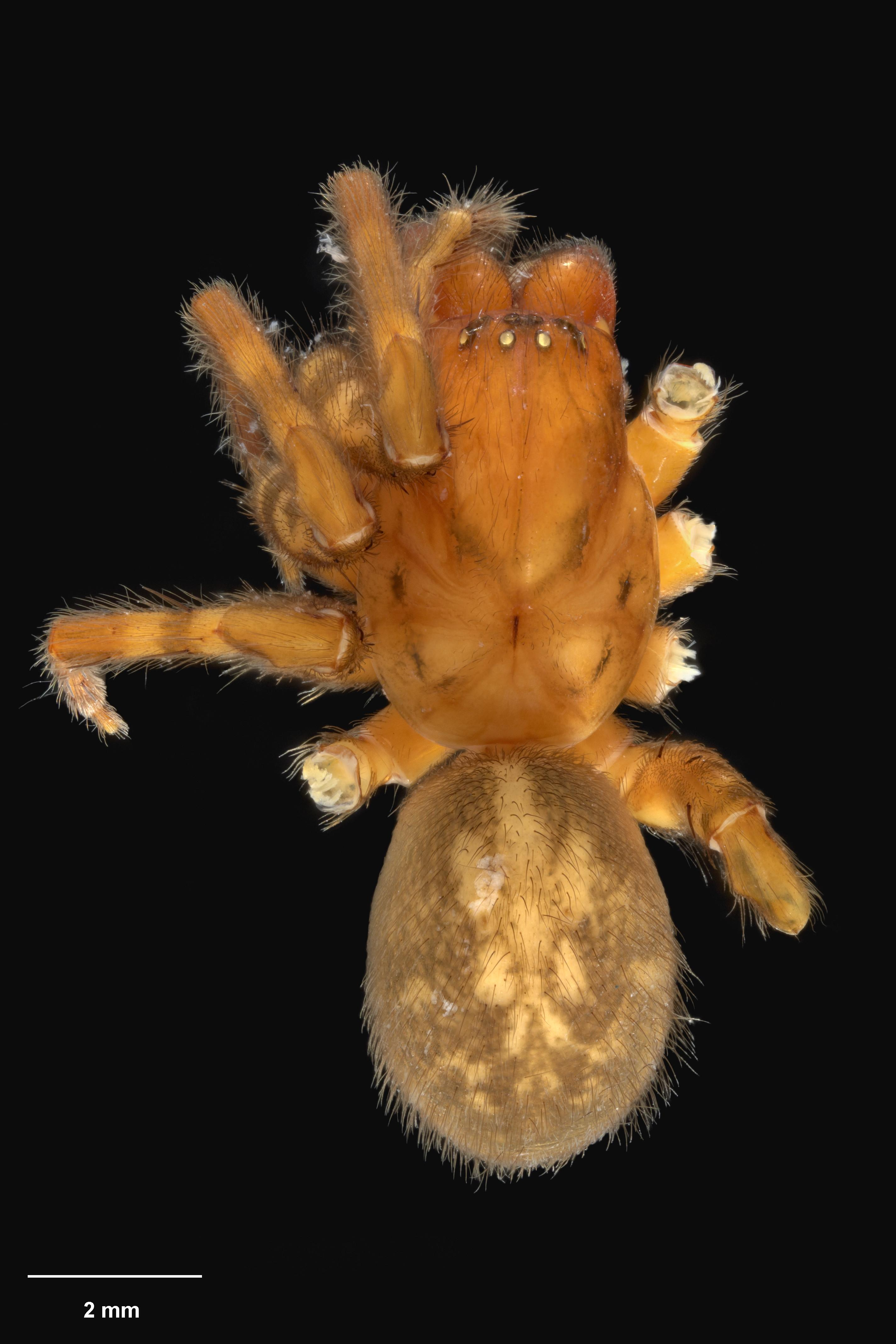

Conservation status
- Not Threatened (NZ TCS)

Scientific classification
- Kingdom: Animalia
- Phylum: Arthropoda
- Subphylum: Chelicerata
- Class: Arachnida
- Order: Araneae
- Infraorder: Araneomorphae
- Family: Desidae
- Genus: Reinga
- Species: R. media

Binomial name
- Reinga media Forster & Wilton, 1973

= Reinga media =

Species of spider

Reinga media is a species of spider in the family Desidae that is endemic to New Zealand.

== Taxonomy ==
This species was described by Ray Forster and Cecil Wilton in 1973 from female specimens. The holotype is stored in Te Papa Museum under registration number AS.000066.

== Description ==
The female is recorded at 10.3mm in length. The carapace is coloured pale orange brown. The legs are yellowish brown with dark bands. The abdomen is dark brown with pale markings dorsally.

== Distribution ==
This species is only known from Great Barrier Island and Cuvier Island in New Zealand.

== Conservation status ==
Under the New Zealand Threat Classification System, this species is listed as "Not Threatened".
