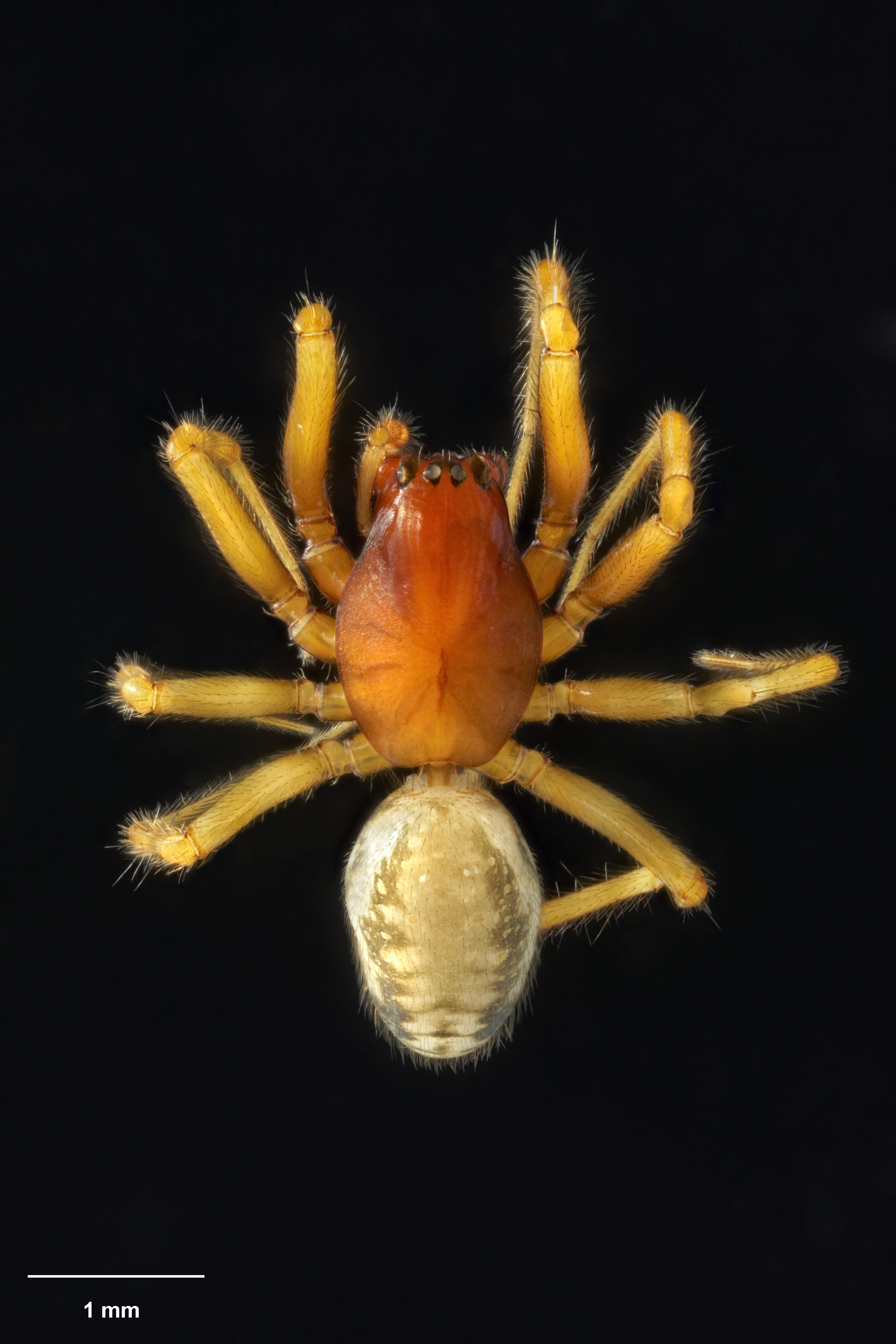

Conservation status
- Not Threatened (NZ TCS)

Scientific classification
- Domain: Eukaryota
- Kingdom: Animalia
- Phylum: Arthropoda
- Subphylum: Chelicerata
- Class: Arachnida
- Order: Araneae
- Infraorder: Araneomorphae
- Family: Linyphiidae
- Genus: Parafroneta
- Species: P. demota

Binomial name
- Parafroneta demota Blest & Vink, 2002

= Parafroneta demota =

Species of spider

Parafroneta demota is a species of sheet weaver spider endemic to New Zealand.

== Taxonomy ==
This species was described in 2002 by A.D Blest and Cor Vink from male and female specimens. The holotype is stored in Te Papa Museum under registration number AS.000507.

== Description ==
The male is recorded at 3.63mm in length whereas the female is 3.38mm. The male has a dark brown prosoma and pale brown legs. The abdomen has grey and pale markings. The female is similar, but the abdomen markings differ.

== Distribution ==
This species is only known from the North Island of New Zealand.

== Conservation status ==
Under the New Zealand Threat Classification System, this species is listed as "Not Threatened".
