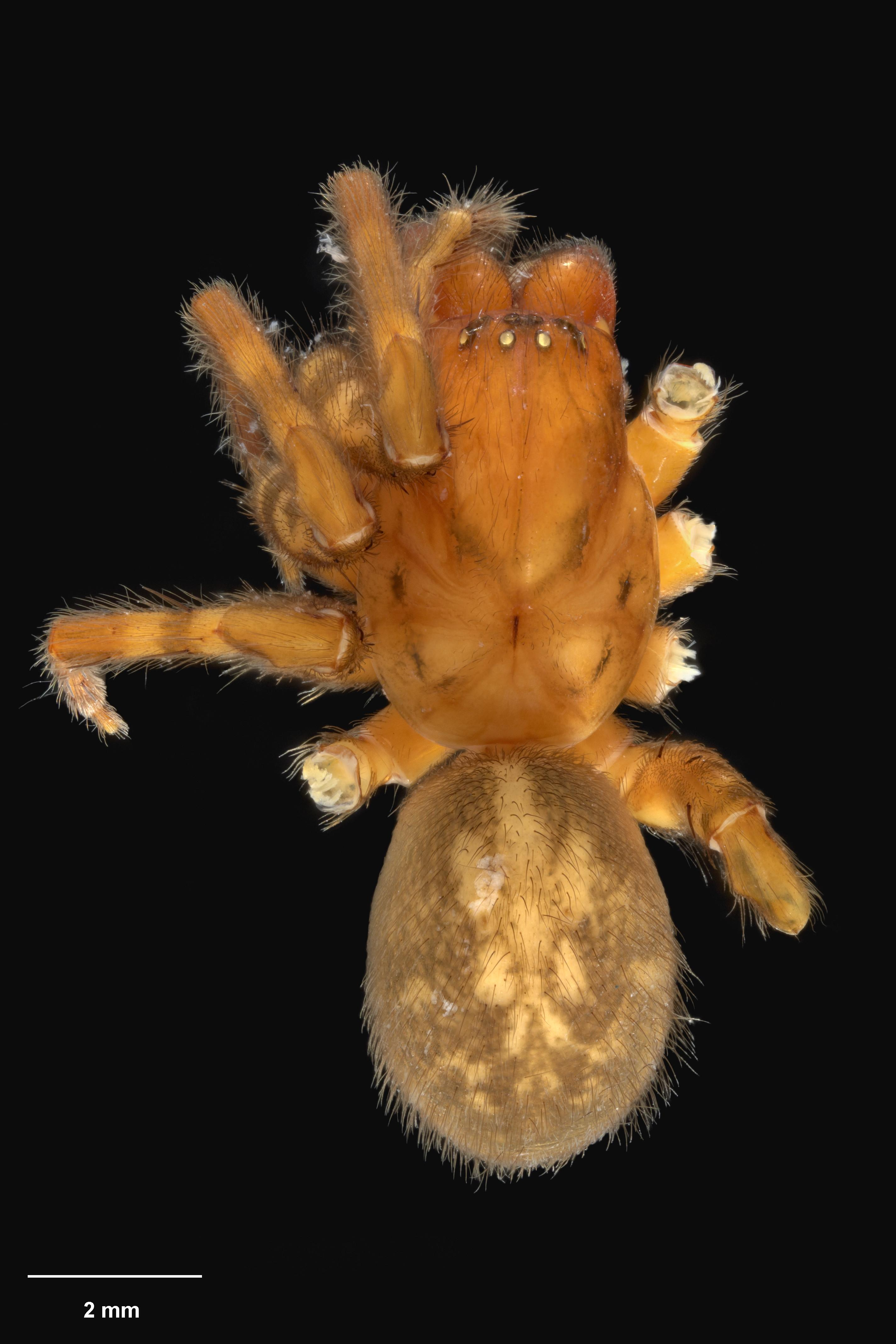

Scientific classification
- Kingdom: Animalia
- Phylum: Arthropoda
- Subphylum: Chelicerata
- Class: Arachnida
- Order: Araneae
- Infraorder: Araneomorphae
- Family: Desidae
- Genus: Reinga; Forster & Wilton, 1973

Type species
- R. media Forster & Wilton, 1973

Species
- 5, see text

= Reinga =

Genus of spiders

Reinga is a genus of intertidal spiders endemic to New Zealand first described by Raymond Robert Forster & C. L. Wilton in 1973.

== Species ==
As of April 2019 it contains five species, all found in New Zealand:

- Reinga apica Forster & Wilton, 1973 – New Zealand
- Reinga aucklandensis (Marples, 1959) – New Zealand
- Reinga grossa Forster & Wilton, 1973 – New Zealand
- Reinga media Forster & Wilton, 1973 – New Zealand
- Reinga waipoua Forster & Wilton, 1973 – New Zealand
