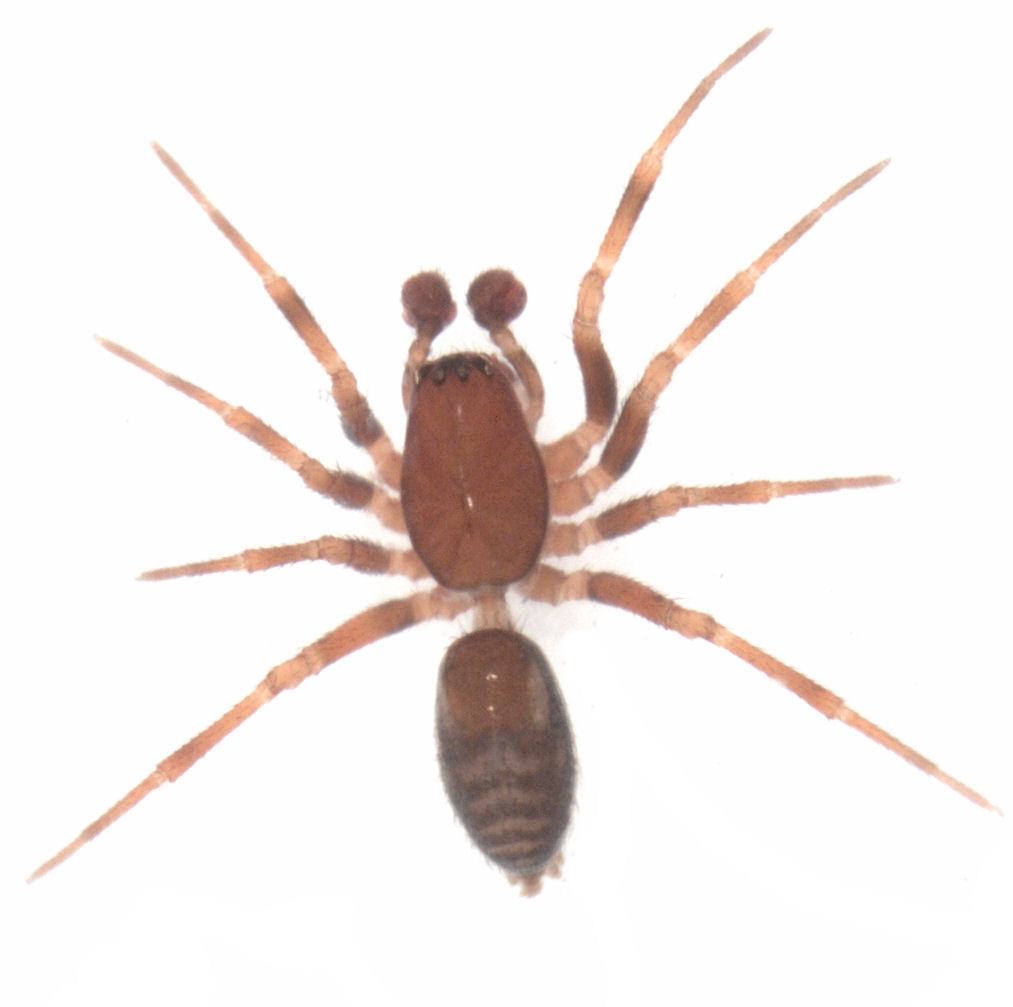

Scientific classification
- Kingdom: Animalia
- Phylum: Arthropoda
- Subphylum: Chelicerata
- Class: Arachnida
- Order: Araneae
- Infraorder: Araneomorphae
- Family: Linyphiidae
- Genus: Dunedinia; Millidge, 1988

Type species
- D. denticulata Millidge, 1988

Species
- 5, see text

= Dunedinia =

Genus of spiders

Dunedinia is a genus of South Pacific dwarf spiders that was first described by Alfred Frank Millidge in 1988.

== Species ==
As of May 2019 it contains five species:

- Dunedinia decolor Millidge, 1988 – New Zealand
- Dunedinia denticulata Millidge, 1988 (type) – New Zealand
- Dunedinia occidentalis Millidge, 1993 – Australia (Western Australia)
- Dunedinia opaca Millidge, 1993 – Australia (South Australia)
- Dunedinia pullata Millidge, 1988 – New Zealand
