= Maorineta tibialis =

Conservation status
- Not Threatened (NZ TCS)

Scientific classification
- Domain: Eukaryota
- Kingdom: Animalia
- Phylum: Arthropoda
- Subphylum: Chelicerata
- Class: Arachnida
- Order: Araneae
- Infraorder: Araneomorphae
- Family: Linyphiidae
- Genus: Maorineta
- Species: M. tibialis

Binomial name
- Maorineta tibialis Millidge, 1988

Species of spider

Maorineta tibialis is a species of sheet weaver spider endemic to New Zealand.

== Taxonomy ==
This species was described in 1988 by Alfred Frank Millidge from female and male specimens. It is the type specimen of the Maorineta genus. The holotype is stored in Otago Museum.

== Description ==
The female is recorded at 1.8-2.1mm in length whereas the male is 1.65-1.70mm. This species has a brown carapace that is blackish around the fovea. The legs are yellow brown to orange. The abdomen is grey to black and has a white patch dorsally.

== Distribution ==
This species is only known from the South Island of New Zealand.

== Conservation status ==
Under the New Zealand Threat Classification System, this species is listed as "Not Threatened".
