= Maorineta =

Scientific classification
- Kingdom: Animalia
- Phylum: Arthropoda
- Subphylum: Chelicerata
- Class: Arachnida
- Order: Araneae
- Infraorder: Araneomorphae
- Family: Linyphiidae
- Genus: Maorineta; Millidge, 1988

Type species
- M. tibialis Millidge, 1988

Species
- 8, see text

Genus of spiders

Maorineta is a genus of dwarf spiders that was first described by Alfred Frank Millidge in 1988.

== Species ==
As of May 2021 it contains nine species, found in Indonesia, Kiribati, Marshall Islands, and New Zealand:

- Maorineta acerba Millidge, 1988 – New Zealand
- Maorineta ambigua Millidge, 1991 – Marshall Is., Caroline Is., Cook Is.
- Maorineta gentilis Millidge, 1988 – New Zealand
- Maorineta minor Millidge, 1988 – New Zealand
- Maorineta mollis Millidge, 1988 – New Zealand
- Maorineta sulcata Millidge, 1988 – New Zealand
- Maorineta tibialis Millidge, 1988 (type) – New Zealand
- Maorineta tumida Millidge, 1988 – New Zealand
