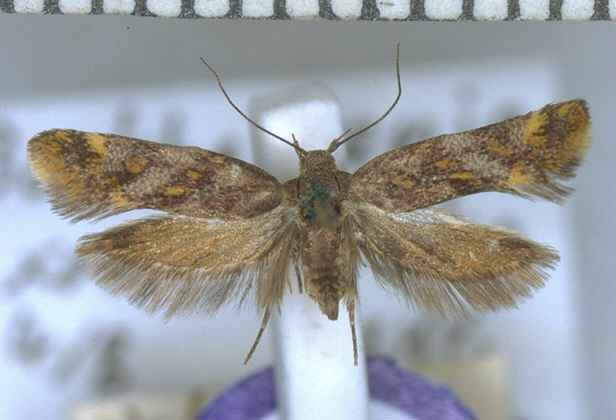
- Female lectotype

Scientific classification
- Kingdom: Animalia
- Phylum: Arthropoda
- Class: Insecta
- Order: Lepidoptera
- Family: Oecophoridae
- Genus: Tingena
- Species: T. xanthomicta

Binomial name
- Tingena xanthomicta (Meyrick, 1916)

Synonyms
- Borkhausenia xanthomicta Meyrick, 1916

= Tingena xanthomicta =

Species of moth, endemic to New Zealand

Tingena xanthomicta is a species of moth in the family Oecophoridae. It is endemic to New Zealand and has been found in both the North and South Islands. This species inhabits native scrub on hillsides and appears to be attracted to Coprosma areolata. Adults are on the wing from November until February.

== Taxonomy ==
This species was first described by Edward Meyrick in 1916 using a specimen collected in Wellington in November by George Hudson and named Borkhausenia xanthomicta. George Hudson discussed and illustrated this species under the name B. xanthomicta in his 1928 publication The butterflies and moths of New Zealand. Philpott discussed this species under the name B. xanthomicta and studied the male genitalia of this species. In 1988 J. S. Dugdale placed this species within the genus Tingena. Dugdale noted that the male paralectotype from Wellington has genitalia very similar to that of the male T. affinis as illustrated by Philpott in 1926. Dugdale goes on to state that the male paralectotype genitalia agrees with the illustrations of that species figured by Philpott in 1926. The female lectotype, collected in Wellington, is held in at the Natural History Museum, London.

== Description ==
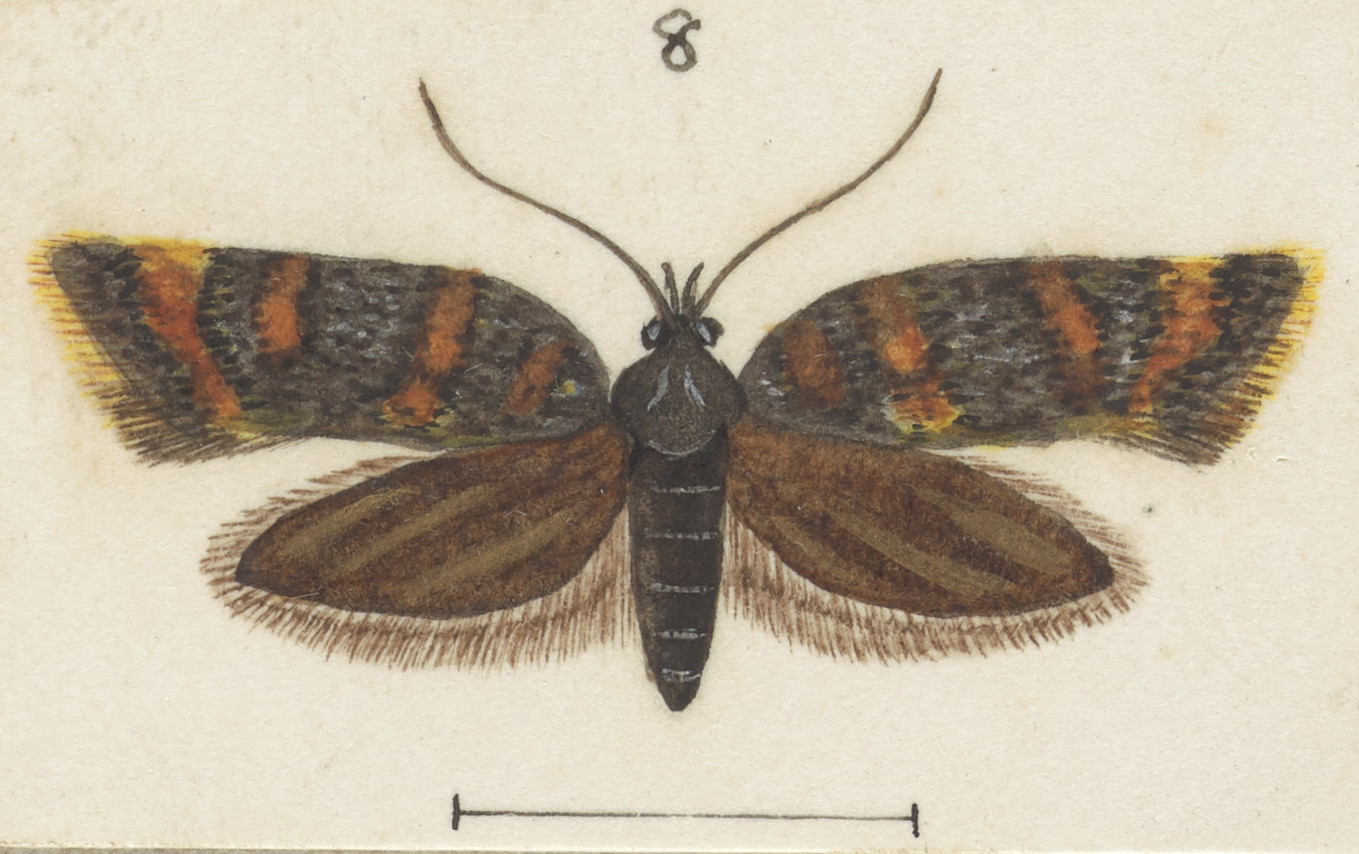
T. xanthomicta as illustrated by George Hudson.

Meyrick described this species as follows:

♂♀ 13–16 mm. Head, palpi, thorax, and abdomen dark fuscous. Antennal ciliations of ♂ 1. Forewings elongate, widest before middle, costa gently arched, apex pointed, termen extremely obliquely rounded; dark fuscous, sometimes obscurely whitish-sprinkled; markings light yellow-ochreous, more or less tinged with ferruginous in disc; a thick oblique streak from near base m middle to above dorsum at 2/5; oblique narrow more or less incomplete fasciae before and beyond middle, usually not reaching costa; an inwardly oblique transverse spot from costa at 4/5: cilia yellowish, becoming ferruginous-yellow towards base, on costa, and tornus fuscous mixed with ferruginous-yellow towards base. Hindwings dark grev: cilia grey, basal third darker.

== Distribution ==
This species is endemic to New Zealand. It has been observed in the Wellington region, at Queenstown, at Lake Wakatipu and in Invercargill.

== Behaviour ==
Adults of this species are on the wing in November to February.

== Habitat ==
This species inhabits native scrub on hillsides and appears to be attracted to Coprosma areolata.
