= Paranapis insula =

Conservation status
- Not Threatened (NZ TCS)

Scientific classification
- Kingdom: Animalia
- Phylum: Arthropoda
- Subphylum: Chelicerata
- Class: Arachnida
- Order: Araneae
- Infraorder: Araneomorphae
- Family: Anapidae
- Genus: Paranapis
- Species: P. insula

Binomial name
- Paranapis insula (Forster, 1951)

Synonyms
- Chasmocephalon insulum Pseudanapis insula

Species of spider

Paranapis insula is a species of Anapidae that is endemic to New Zealand.

== Taxonomy ==
This species was described as Chasmocephalon insulum in 1951 by Ray Forster from a single male specimen. In 1959 it was transferred to Pseudanapis. It was most recently transferred to Paranapis in 1989 where the female was also described. The holotype is stored in Canterbury Museum.

== Description ==
The male is recorded at 1.41mm in length whereas the female is 1.37mm. This species has a dark reddish brown carapace and legs. The abdomen is a mix of pale brown and white colours.

== Distribution ==
This species is only known from the North Island of New Zealand.

== Conservation status ==
Under the New Zealand Threat Classification System, this species is listed as "Not Threatened".
