= Paranapis =

Scientific classification
- Kingdom: Animalia
- Phylum: Arthropoda
- Subphylum: Chelicerata
- Class: Arachnida
- Order: Araneae
- Infraorder: Araneomorphae
- Family: Anapidae
- Genus: Paranapis; Platnick & Forster, 1989

Type species
- P. insula (Forster, 1951)

Species
- P. insula (Forster, 1951) – New Zealand; P. isolata Platnick & Forster, 1989 – New Zealand

Genus of spiders

Paranapis is a genus of South Pacific araneomorph spiders in the family Anapidae, first described by Norman I. Platnick & Raymond Robert Forster in 1989. As of October 2026 it contains only two species, both found in New Zealand.
