= Reinga apica =

Conservation status
- Not Threatened (NZ TCS)

Scientific classification
- Kingdom: Animalia
- Phylum: Arthropoda
- Subphylum: Chelicerata
- Class: Arachnida
- Order: Araneae
- Infraorder: Araneomorphae
- Family: Desidae
- Genus: Reinga
- Species: R. apica

Binomial name
- Reinga apica Forster & Wilton, 1973

Species of spider

Reinga apica is a species of spider in the family Desidae that is endemic to New Zealand.

== Taxonomy ==
This species was described by Ray Forster and Cecil Wilton in 1973 from female specimens. The holotype is stored in Otago Museum.

== Description ==
The female is recorded at 8.9mm in length. The carapace is coloured pale orange brown and darkens anteriorly. The legs are yellowish brown with dark bands. The abdomen is dark brown with pale markings dorsally.

== Distribution ==
This species is only known from Northland, New Zealand.

== Conservation status ==
Under the New Zealand Threat Classification System, this species is listed as "Not Threatened".
