= Maorineta tumida =

Conservation status
- Not Threatened (NZ TCS)

Scientific classification
- Domain: Eukaryota
- Kingdom: Animalia
- Phylum: Arthropoda
- Subphylum: Chelicerata
- Class: Arachnida
- Order: Araneae
- Infraorder: Araneomorphae
- Family: Linyphiidae
- Genus: Maorineta
- Species: M. tumida

Binomial name
- Maorineta tumida Millidge, 1988

Species of spider

Maorineta tumida is a species of sheet weaver spider endemic to New Zealand.

== Taxonomy ==
This species was described in 1988 by Alfred Frank Millidge from female and male specimens. The holotype is stored in Otago Museum.

== Description ==
The female is recorded at 1.50-1.65mm in length whereas the male is 1.50-1.55mm. This species has a yellow brown to brown carapace with blackish markings. The legs are yellow brown. The abdomen is black, sometimes having a white patch dorsally.

== Distribution ==
This species is only known from the South Island of New Zealand.

== Conservation status ==
Under the New Zealand Threat Classification System, this species is listed as "Not Threatened".
