= Reinga aucklandensis =

Conservation status
- Data Deficient (NZ TCS)

Scientific classification
- Domain: Eukaryota
- Kingdom: Animalia
- Phylum: Arthropoda
- Subphylum: Chelicerata
- Class: Arachnida
- Order: Araneae
- Infraorder: Araneomorphae
- Family: Desidae
- Genus: Reinga
- Species: R. aucklandensis

Binomial name
- Reinga aucklandensis (Marples, 1959)

Synonyms
- Syrorisa aucklandensis; Epimecinus aucklandensis

Species of spider

Reinga aucklandensis is a species of spider in the family Desidae that is endemic to New Zealand.

== Taxonomy ==
This species was described as Syrorisa aucklandensis by Brian John Marples in 1959 from a female specimen. It was most recently revised in 1973. The holotype is stored in Otago Museum.

== Description ==
The female is recorded at 6.62mm in length. The carapace is coloured yellow with a grey marking dorsally. The legs are yellow and with grey bands. The abdomen is grey with white markings dorsally.

== Distribution ==
This species is only known from Auckland, New Zealand.

== Conservation status ==
Under the New Zealand Threat Classification System, this species is listed as "Data Deficient" with the qualifiers of "Data Poor: Size", "Data Poor: Trend" and "One Location".
