= New Zealand Nationally Significant Collections and Databases =

The New Zealand Nationally Significant Collections and Databases (NSCDs) are government-funded biological and physical collections or databases that are considered important and significant to New Zealand.

They consist of living organisms (ICMP culture collection), preserved samples (Marine Benthic Biology Collection), or data (New Zealand Geomagnetic Database). Many of the physical collections also have associated databases.

The NSCDs were established in 1992 during the breakup of the DSIR and establishment of the Crown Research Institutes. They are currently funded at NZ$19 million per annum though the Strategic Science Investment Fund of MBIE.

List of Nationally Significant Collections and Databases
Collection/Database	Custodian
Margot Forde Germplasm Centre	AgResearch
Cawthron Institute Micro-algae Collection	Cawthron Institute
National Earthquake Information Database National Groundwater Monitoring Programme National Petrology Reference Collection and PET Database New Zealand Fossil Record File New Zealand Geomagnetic Database New Zealand National Paleontological Collection and Database New Zealand Volcano Database Regional Geological Map Archive and Database	Institute of Geological and Nuclear Sciences Limited (GNS)
Allan Herbarium (CHR) International Collection of Microorganisms from Plants (ICMP) Land Resource Information System (LRIS) National Vegetation Survey Databank (NVS) New Zealand Arthropod Collection (NZAC) New Zealand Fungarium (PDD) Nga Tipu Whakaoranga Ethnobotany Database Te Kohinga Harakaka o Aotearoa – New Zealand Flax Collection	Landcare Research New Zealand Limited
National Climate Database New Zealand Freshwater Fish Database NIWA Marine Invertebrate Collection Water Resources Archive	National Institute of Water and Atmospheric Research Limited (NIWA)
Arable and Vegetable Crop Germplasm Fruit Crop Germplasm	The New Zealand Institute of Plant and Food Research Limited
National Forestry Herbarium (NZFRI)	Scion
