= Parafroneta monticola =

Conservation status
- Data Deficient (NZ TCS)

Scientific classification
- Domain: Eukaryota
- Kingdom: Animalia
- Phylum: Arthropoda
- Subphylum: Chelicerata
- Class: Arachnida
- Order: Araneae
- Infraorder: Araneomorphae
- Family: Linyphiidae
- Genus: Parafroneta
- Species: P. monticola

Binomial name
- Parafroneta monticola Blest, 1979

Species of spider

Parafroneta monticola is a species of sheet weaver spider endemic to New Zealand.

== Taxonomy ==
This species was described in 1979 by A.D Blest from a female specimen. The holotype is stored in Otago Museum.

== Description ==
The female is recorded at 2.92mm in length. This species has a dusky brown cephalothorax, dusky brown legs and uniform dark grey abdomen.

== Distribution ==
This species is only known from Otago, New Zealand.

== Conservation status ==
Under the New Zealand Threat Classification System, this species is listed as "Data Deficient" with the qualifiers of "Data Poor: Size", "Data Poor: Trend" and "One Location".
