= Marie Taylor (mycologist) =

New Zealand botanist, mycologist and scientific illustrator (1930–1999)

- Born: Grace Marie Bulmer; 28 April 1930; New Zealand
- Died: 24 April 1999 (aged 68)
- Known for: Contributions to mycology
- Scientific career
- Fields: Mycology
- Author abbrev. (botany): G.M.Taylor

Grace Marie Taylor née Bulmer (28 April 1930 – 24 April 1999) was a New Zealand mycologist and botanist as well as a scientific illustrator. She described several new species of fungi and published and illustrated books on New Zealand fungi and plants.

== Background and education ==
Taylor was born Grace Marie Bulmer in 1930. She attended New Plymouth Girls' High before going on to study at Victoria University of Wellington. Taylor gained a Bachelor of Science and a Master of Science with honours studying botany. Her master's thesis was entitled, A Study of the Life-History of Ourisia macrophylla (Hook.). She then went on to attend the Auckland Teachers Training College before beginning work as a teacher at Wellington Girls' College.

== Researches in mycology ==
Taylor began undertaking lab demonstration work at Victoria University of Wellington which in turn led to her becoming a lecturer in botany at that University. Her professional botany career was then interrupted with her marriage and the subsequent birth of her children. She lived with her family in Oamaru and undertook numerous field trips from and around that location. During this time she authored a key to the genus Cosprosma. In 1971 Taylor moved to Auckland and was employed by the University of Auckland as a senior tutor teaching botany. She became a member of the Auckland Botanical Society. She continued to undertake research and to draw the species she was studying. It was around this time that Taylor published the first of her books on New Zealand fungi which she herself illustrated, Mushrooms and Toadstools in New Zealand. She would go on to publish another book that she also illustrated Mushrooms and Toadstools in 1981. During her career Taylor would describe at least 21 species that were new to science. Her final work Meanings and Origins of Botanical Names of New Zealand Plants was published in 2002 after her death. Taylor died on 24 April 1999.

Taylor created an historically important private collection of New Zealand fungi. This was incorporated with the collections of Greta Stevenson and Barbara Segedin to form the basis of the New Zealand Fungarium.

In 2017, Taylor was selected as one of the Royal Society Te Apārangi's "150 women in 150 words", celebrating women's contribution to knowledge in New Zealand.

== Eponymous taxa ==
- Entoloma mariae G. Stev. (1962)
- Cortinarius taylorianus E. Horak (1990)
- Cortinarius mariae (E. Horak) E. Horak, Peintner, M.M. Moser & Vilgalys (2002)

== Selected works ==
- Bulmer, G Marie (1951). A Study of the Life-History of Ourisia macrophylla (Hook.) (Thesis). Victoria University of Wellington. hdl:ir.wgtn.ac.nz/handle/123456789/22482. Wikidata Q126934603.
- Taylor, M. (1970) Mushrooms and Toadstools in New Zealand. A. H. & A. W. Reid, Wellington 32 pp.
- ___________. (1981) Mushrooms and Toadstools. Mobil New Zealand Nature Series. A. H. & A. W. Reed, Wellington. 79 pp.
- ___________. (1983) Some Common Fungi of Auckland City. Tane 29 133–142.
- ___________. and Watling, Roy. (1987) Observations on the Bolbitiaceae, 27 : preliminary account of the Bolbitiaceae of New Zealand. J. Cramer, Berlin. 61 pp.
- ___________. (2002) Meanings and Origins of Botanical Names of New Zealand Plants. Auckland: Auckland Botanical Society. 201 pp.

== See also ==
- List of mycologists
