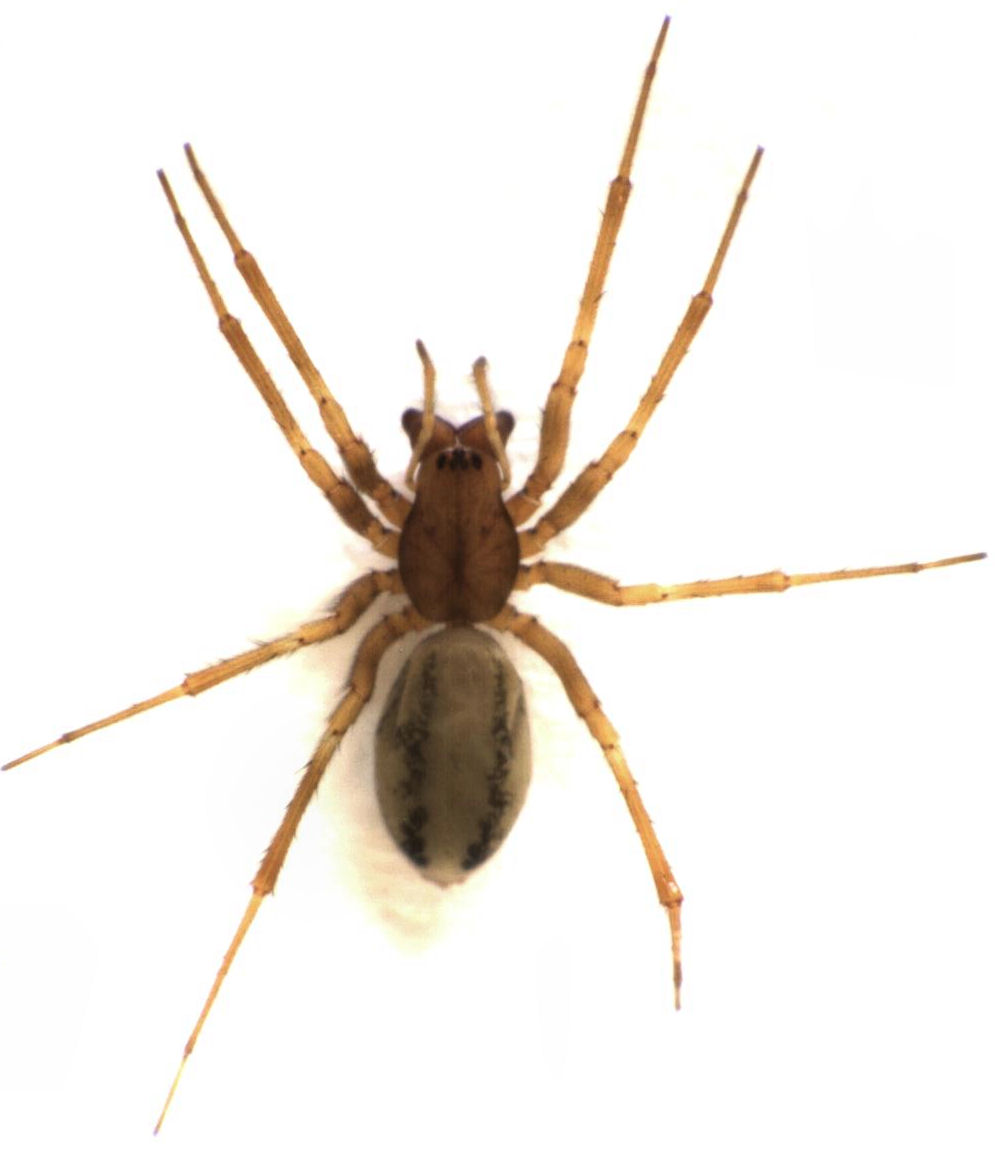
- P. marrineri, female

Scientific classification
- Kingdom: Animalia
- Phylum: Arthropoda
- Subphylum: Chelicerata
- Class: Arachnida
- Order: Araneae
- Infraorder: Araneomorphae
- Family: Linyphiidae
- Genus: Parafroneta; Blest, 1979

Type species
- P. marrineri (Hogg, 1909)

Species
- 14, see text

= Parafroneta =

Genus of spiders

Parafroneta is a genus of South Pacific dwarf spiders that was first described by A. D. Blest in 1979.

== Species ==
As of May 2019 it contains fourteen species:

- Parafroneta ambigua Blest, 1979 – New Zealand
- Parafroneta confusa Blest, 1979 – New Zealand
- Parafroneta demota Blest & Vink, 2002 – New Zealand
- Parafroneta haurokoae Blest & Vink, 2002 – New Zealand
- Parafroneta hirsuta Blest & Vink, 2003 – New Zealand
- Parafroneta insula Blest, 1979 – New Zealand
- Parafroneta marrineri (Hogg, 1909) (type) – New Zealand (Campbell Is.)
- Parafroneta minuta Blest, 1979 – New Zealand
- Parafroneta monticola Blest, 1979 – New Zealand
- Parafroneta persimilis Blest, 1979 – New Zealand
- Parafroneta pilosa Blest & Vink, 2003 – New Zealand
- Parafroneta subalpina Blest & Vink, 2002 – New Zealand
- Parafroneta subantarctica Blest, 1979 – New Zealand
- Parafroneta westlandica Blest & Vink, 2002 – New Zealand
