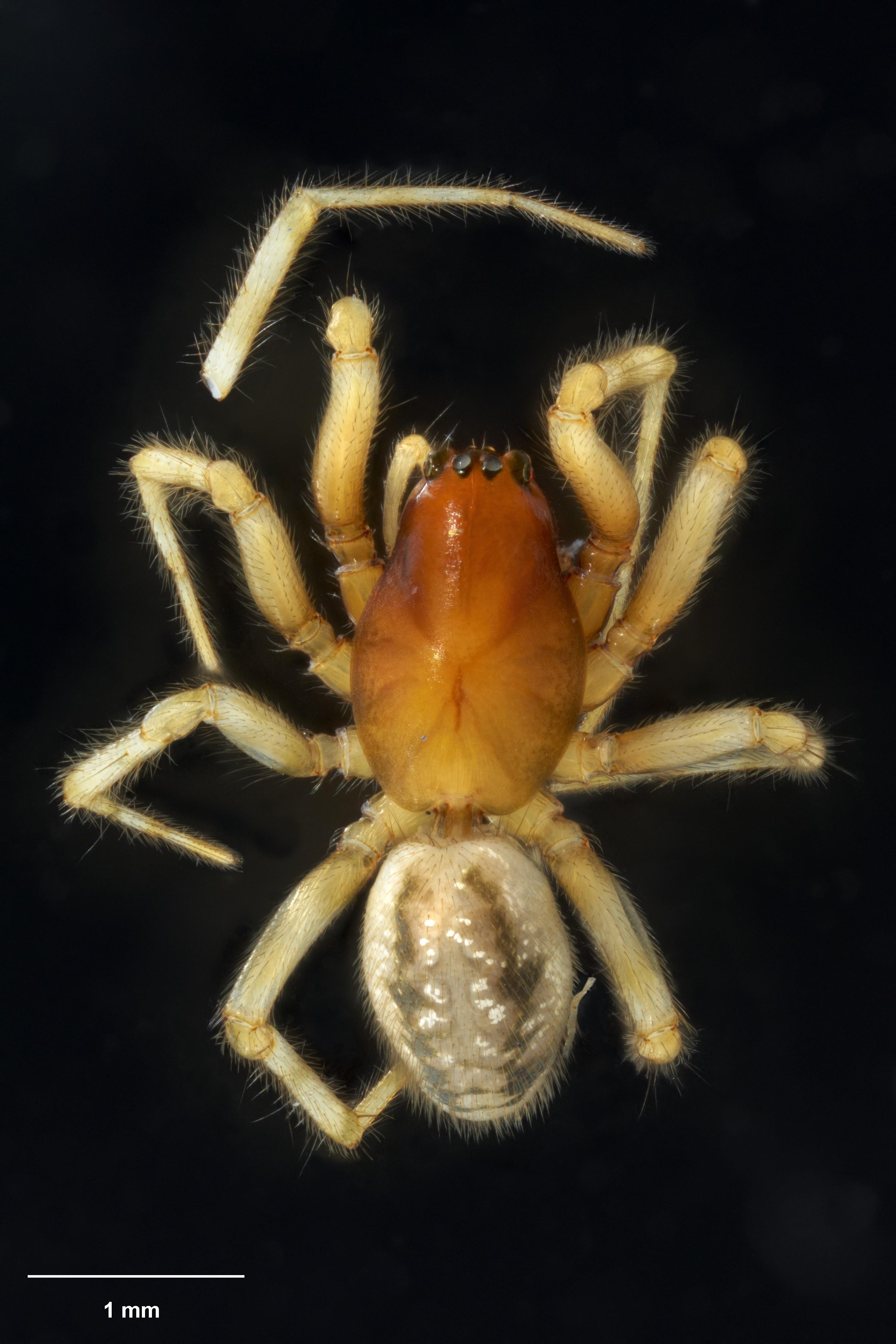

Conservation status
- Not Threatened (NZ TCS)

Scientific classification
- Domain: Eukaryota
- Kingdom: Animalia
- Phylum: Arthropoda
- Subphylum: Chelicerata
- Class: Arachnida
- Order: Araneae
- Infraorder: Araneomorphae
- Family: Linyphiidae
- Genus: Parafroneta
- Species: P. westlandica

Binomial name
- Parafroneta westlandica Blest & Vink, 2002

= Parafroneta westlandica =

Species of spider

Parafroneta westlandica is a species of sheet weaver spider endemic to New Zealand.

== Taxonomy ==
This species was described in 2002 by A.D Blest and Cor Vink from male and female specimens. The holotype is stored in Te Papa Museum under registration number AS.000584.

== Description ==
Males are recorded to be 3.26 mm in length, while females measure 3.63 mm. This species features a dark brown prosoma and pale brown legs, with a dark grey abdomen adorned with pale markings.

== Distribution ==
This species is only known from Westland and Canterbury in New Zealand.

== Conservation status ==
Under the New Zealand Threat Classification System, this species is listed as "Not Threatened".
