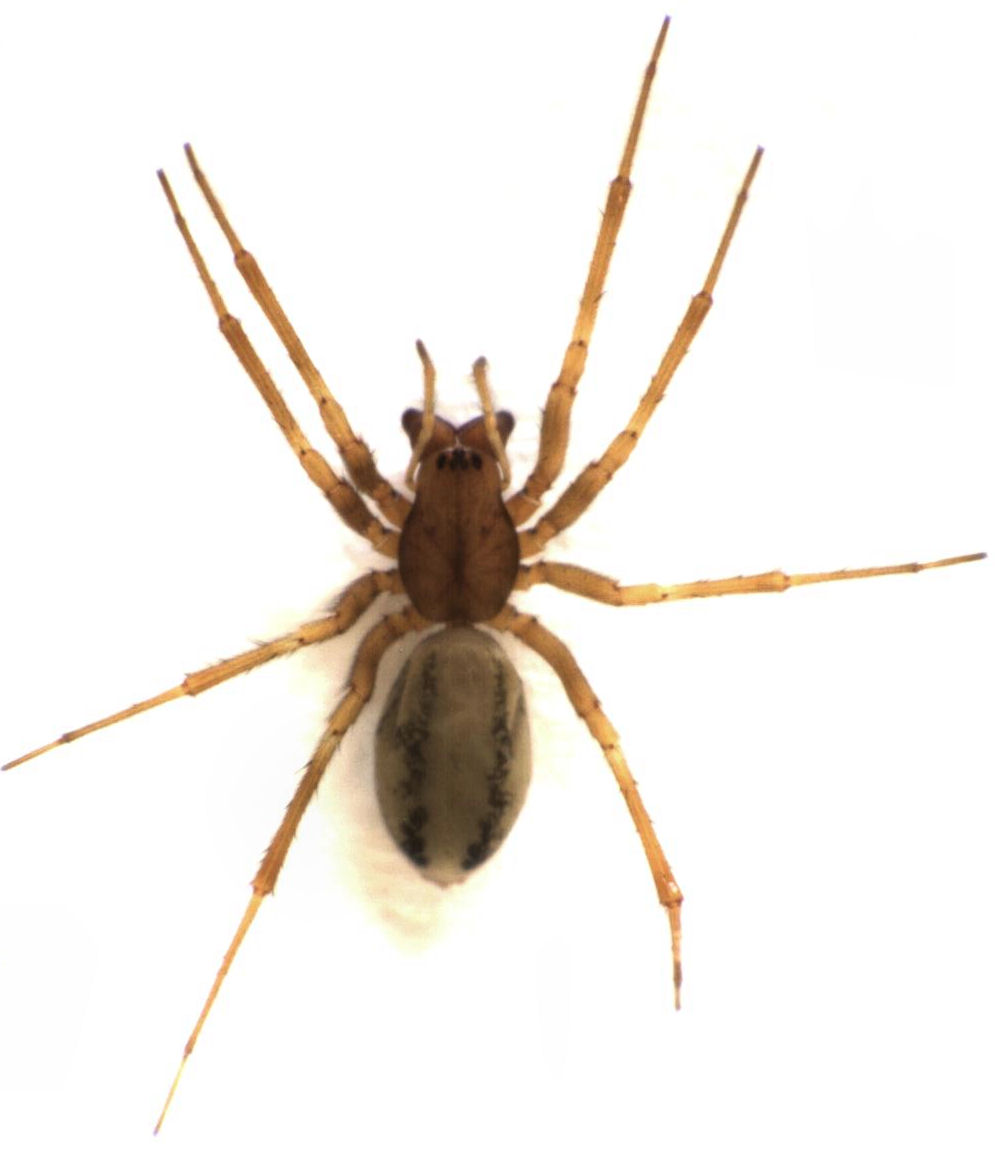

Conservation status
- Naturally Uncommon (NZ TCS)

Scientific classification
- Kingdom: Animalia
- Phylum: Arthropoda
- Subphylum: Chelicerata
- Class: Arachnida
- Order: Araneae
- Infraorder: Araneomorphae
- Family: Linyphiidae
- Genus: Parafroneta
- Species: P. marrineri

Binomial name
- Parafroneta marrineri (Hogg, 1909)

Synonyms
- Mynoglenes marrineri

= Parafroneta marrineri =

Species of spider

Parafroneta marrineri is a species of sheet weaver spider endemic to New Zealand.

== Taxonomy ==
This species was described as Mynoglenes marrineri in 1909 by Henry Roughton Hogg from female specimens. It was most recently revised in 1979, in which it was moved to the Parafroneta genus. It is the type specimen of Parafroneta.

== Description ==
The male is recorded at 5.34mm in length whereas the female is 6.5mm. This species has an orange cephalothorax, orange legs and a grey abdomen that has grey markings dorsally.

== Distribution ==
This species is only known from New Zealand's subantarctic islands.

== Conservation status ==
Under the New Zealand Threat Classification System, this species is listed as "Naturally Uncommon" with the qualifier of "Range Restricted".
