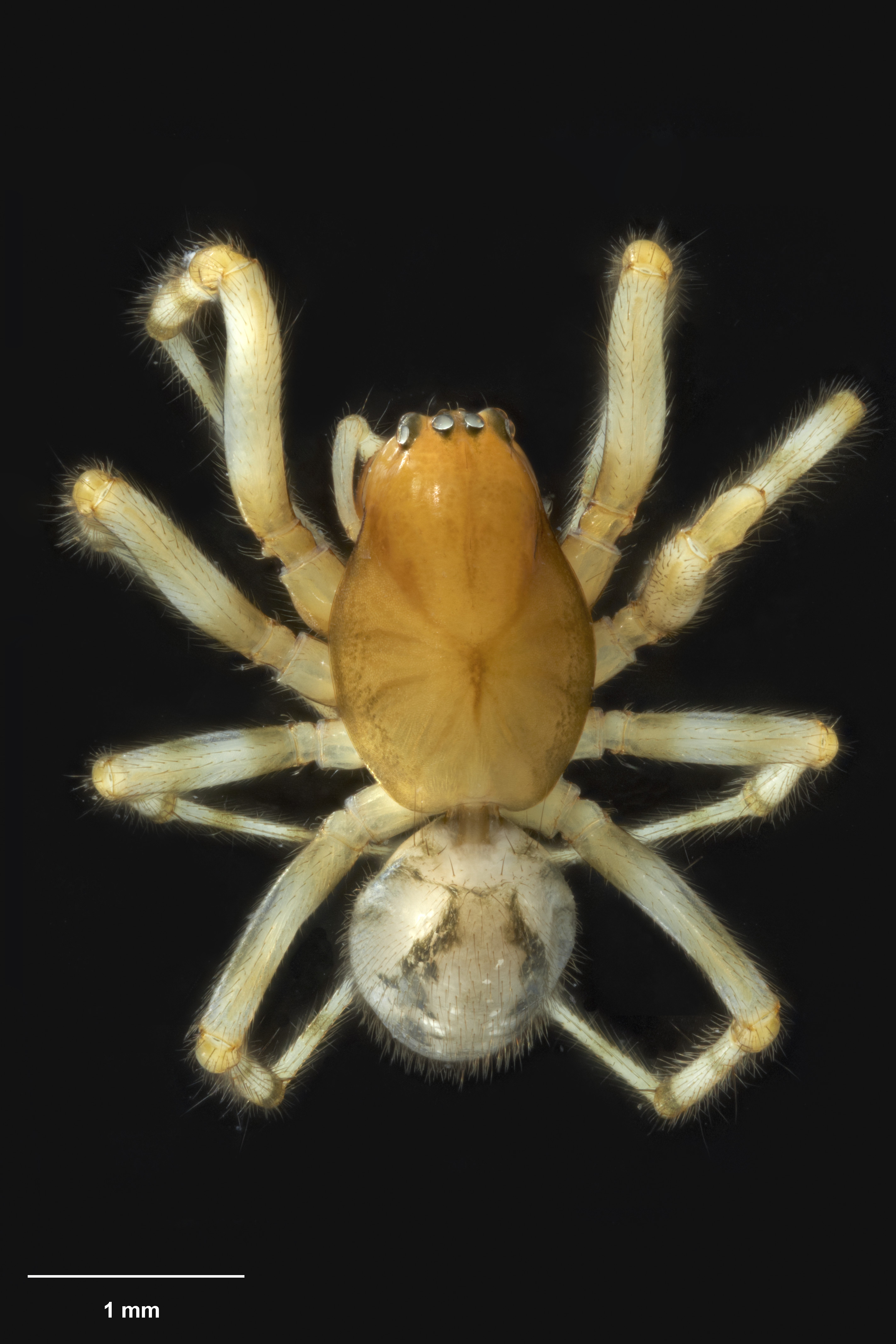

Conservation status
- Data Deficient (NZ TCS)

Scientific classification
- Domain: Eukaryota
- Kingdom: Animalia
- Phylum: Arthropoda
- Subphylum: Chelicerata
- Class: Arachnida
- Order: Araneae
- Infraorder: Araneomorphae
- Family: Linyphiidae
- Genus: Parafroneta
- Species: P. hirsuta

Binomial name
- Parafroneta hirsuta Blest & Vink, 2003

= Parafroneta hirsuta =

Species of spider

Parafroneta hirsuta is a species of sheet weaver spider endemic to New Zealand.

== Taxonomy ==
This species was described in 2003 by A.D Blest and Cor Vink from male and female specimens. The holotype is stored in Te Papa Museum under registration number AS.000500.

== Description ==
The male is recorded at 3.7mm in length whereas the female is 5.1mm. The male has a brown prosoma, brown legs and a black abdomen that has pale markings. The female is similar, the prosoma is dark brown.

== Distribution ==
This species is only known from Nelson, New Zealand.

== Conservation status ==
Under the New Zealand Threat Classification System, this species is listed as "Data Deficient" with the qualifiers of "Data Poor: Size" and "Data Poor: Trend".
