= New Zealand Fungarium =

Fungi collection in Auckland, New Zealand

Coordinates: 36.88350909°S 174.84913089°E

New Zealand Fungarium (PDD)
- Te Kohinga Hekaheka o Aotearoa
- Established: 1919
- Location: Auckland
- Type: Collection of dried fungi
- Key holdings: Fungi from New Zealand and the South Pacific
- Collection size: 109,584 objects
- Founder: G.H. Cunningham
- Curator: Mahajabeen Padamsee
- Owner: Landcare Research
- Website: www.landcareresearch.co.nz/pdd

The New Zealand Fungarium (PDD; Māori: Te Kohinga Hekaheka o Aotearoa) is a fungarium and the major collection of New Zealand fungi. It is one of the largest collections in the Southern Hemisphere. The Fungarium is designated a Nationally Significant Collection by the Ministry of Business, Innovation and Employment.

== History ==
The accessioning of collections that led to the establishment of the New Zealand Fungarium (PDD): Te Kohinga Hekaheka o Aotearoa began with the appointment of G.H. Cunningham in 1919 by the Department of Agriculture. Cunningham and the collection were transferred to the Department of Science and Industrial Research's Plant Diseases Division in 1936. This is the origin of the PDD acronym. The DSIR was disestablished and reorganised into a number of Crown Research Institutes (CRIs) in 1992 and the Fungarium is now part of and maintained by the Manaaki Whenua Landcare Research CRI.

== Collections ==
The Fungarium houses the collections of R.E. Beever (Agaricales, Boletales), G.H. Cunningham (Aphyllophorales, Gasteromycetes, Uredinales), J.M. Dingley (Ascomycetes), E. Horak (Agaricales), S.J. Hughes (Hyphomycetes, sooty moulds), R.F.R. McNabb (Agaricales, Boletaceae, Dacrymycetaceae, Tremellaceae), R.H. Petersen (Clavariaceae), G.J. Samuels (Ascomycetes), and K. Curtis. Fungal specimens from the herbarium of the Plant Health and Diagnostic Station, Levin (LEV) have been incorporated into PDD.

The study of the New Zealand native mushrooms and other larger fungi was pioneered by Greta Stevenson, Marie Taylor, and Barbara Segedin from the late 1940s until the 1990s. Collectively they described over 250 new species of New Zealand fungi. All these are available through the Biota of New Zealand or Systematics Collections Data internet portals.

The Fungarium has over 2,900 Type specimens – these are the specimens on which the species descriptions are based. These include over 17,000 New Zealand primary Types.

Fungarium staff undertook an assessment in 2019 to identify native fungi that are endangered. As a result, 30 species were added to the International Union for Conservation of Nature's Red List.
