= Parafroneta confusa =

Conservation status
- Not Threatened (NZ TCS)

Scientific classification
- Domain: Eukaryota
- Kingdom: Animalia
- Phylum: Arthropoda
- Subphylum: Chelicerata
- Class: Arachnida
- Order: Araneae
- Infraorder: Araneomorphae
- Family: Linyphiidae
- Genus: Parafroneta
- Species: P. confusa

Binomial name
- Parafroneta confusa Blest, 1979

Species of spider

Parafroneta confusa is a species of sheet weaver spider endemic to New Zealand.

== Taxonomy ==
This species was described in 1979 by A.D Blest from male and female specimens. The holotype is stored in Otago Museum.

== Description ==
The male is recorded at 6mm in length whereas the female is 6.58mm. The male has a dark brown cephalothorax, brown legs and a grey abdomen with pale markings. The female is similar, but paler.

== Distribution ==
This species is known from throughout New Zealand.

== Conservation status ==
Under the New Zealand Threat Classification System, this species is listed as "Not Threatened".
