= Doug Dye =

New Zealand microbiologist (1921–2005)

Dr Doug Dye
- Born: Douglas Winton Dye; 12 July 1921
- Died: 18 December 2005 (aged 84)
- Education: PhD (Edinburgh) 1958
- Employer: New Zealand Department of Scientific and Industrial Research
- Known for: Microbiologist

Douglas Winton Dye (12 July 1921 – 18 December 2005) was a New Zealand microbiologist.

== Biography ==
Dye graduated with a Bachelor of Agricultural Science from Massey Agricultural College in 1944. He began work with the DSIR in 1946 and for the first 10 years of his career, worked as a pathologist on the pathogenic bacteria of crops in New Zealand. From 1956 until 1958, he studied in Edinburgh for his PhD, the subject of which was the taxonomy of Xanthomonas. It was this meticulous work, showing the absence of phenotypic diversity between specific pathogens in this genus, that led to the development of pathovar nomenclature, applied internationally to plant pathogenic bacteria today.

Subsequently, he clarified the relationships within the major bacterial groups represented by Erwinia and Corynebacterium. Dye worked on several committees connected with bacterial taxonomy, most notably the International Committee on the Systematics of Bacteria, participating in the complete revision of bacterial names contained in the Approved Lists of Names of Bacteria, and the Committee on Taxonomy of Plant Pathogenic Bacteria of the International Society for Plant Pathology, which developed the International Standards for Naming Pathovars.

From the late 1960s, as head of an expanding Bacteriology Section in Plant Diseases Division of DSIR, he maintained a day-to-day interest in wide-ranging studies of his staff. Dye's personal culture collection, begun in 1951, evolved into today's ICMP culture collection held at Landcare Research, Tamaki.

He retired in December 1983, and was made an Honorary Member of the New Zealand Microbiological Society the following year. The bacterial genus Dyella was named after him. The collection and bacteriology laboratory suite at Landcare in Tamaki was named after him in 2004. He attended the naming ceremony.
