= Dunedinia decolor =

Conservation status
- Not Threatened (NZ TCS)

Scientific classification
- Domain: Eukaryota
- Kingdom: Animalia
- Phylum: Arthropoda
- Subphylum: Chelicerata
- Class: Arachnida
- Order: Araneae
- Infraorder: Araneomorphae
- Family: Linyphiidae
- Genus: Dunedinia
- Species: D. decolor

Binomial name
- Dunedinia decolor Millidge, 1988

Species of Arachnida

Dunedinia decolor is a species of Linyphiidae spider that is endemic to New Zealand.

== Taxonomy ==
This species was described in 1988 by Alfred Frank Millidge from female and male specimens. The holotype is stored in Otago Museum.

== Description ==
The female is recorded at 1.80-1.95mm in length whereas the male is 1.75-1.95mm. This species has a brown carapace that is darkened along the margins and fovea. The legs are yellow to brown. The abdomen is white on the dorsal surface with a black chevron pattern.

== Distribution ==
This species is only known from the South Island of New Zealand.

== Conservation status ==
Under the New Zealand Threat Classification System, this species is listed as "Not Threatened".
