= Maorineta acerba =

Conservation status
- Data Deficient (NZ TCS)

Scientific classification
- Domain: Eukaryota
- Kingdom: Animalia
- Phylum: Arthropoda
- Subphylum: Chelicerata
- Class: Arachnida
- Order: Araneae
- Infraorder: Araneomorphae
- Family: Linyphiidae
- Genus: Maorineta
- Species: M. acerba

Binomial name
- Maorineta acerba Millidge, 1988

Species of spider

Maorineta acerba is a species of sheet weaver spider endemic to New Zealand.

== Taxonomy ==
This species was described in 1988 by Alfred Frank Millidge from male specimens. The holotype is stored in Otago Museum.

== Description ==
The male is recorded at 1.50-1.65mm in length. This species has a brown carapace, orange legs and black abdomen with a white patch dorsally.

== Distribution ==
This species is only known from the lower half of the South Island in New Zealand.

== Conservation status ==
Under the New Zealand Threat Classification System, this species is listed as "Data Deficient" with the qualifiers of "Data Poor: Size" and "Data Poor: Trend".
