= International Collection of Microorganisms from Plants =

International Collection of Microorganisms from Plants (ICMP)
- Te Kohinga Moroiti o Aotearoa
- Former name: PDDCC
- Established: 1952
- Location: Auckland
- Type: Culture Collection
- Accreditation: World Federation for Culture Collections: WDCM 589
- Key holdings: environmental and plant associated bacteria, fungi, chromista
- Collection size: 24,000 cultures
- Founder: Doug Dye
- Director: Dr Bevan Weir
- Curator: Dr Bevan Weir
- Owner: Landcare Research
- Website: www.landcareresearch.co.nz/icmp

The International Collection of Microorganisms from Plants (ICMP) is a major international culture collection of live bacteria, fungi, and chromists based in Auckland, New Zealand.

The ICMP had its origin in 1952 as the personal collection of plant pathogenic bacteria and rhizobia of Dr Douglas W. Dye. It expanded as the culture collection (PDDCC) of Plant Diseases Division, and later Plant Protection Division, of the New Zealand Department of Scientific and Industrial Research (DSIR). Following the reorganization of science in New Zealand in 1992, the collection was transferred to Landcare Research, one of eight New Zealand Government-owned "Crown Research Institutes", as a Nationally Significant Collection and Database.

The collection has a strong focus on globally sourced plant pathogens, and fungi of New Zealand and the South Pacific, voucher cultures validate the presence of many plant diseases recorded in New Zealand. The over 22,000 strains are roughly evenly split between bacteria and fungi/yeasts, including 900 type and pathotype cultures. In 1993, preservation using liquid nitrogen was introduced for fungal and bacterial strains which had been difficult to maintain by vacuum drying; this has since been used for all new accessions.

Printed catalogues of strains were published between 1978 and 1999, but have been replaced by an online database updated daily.
