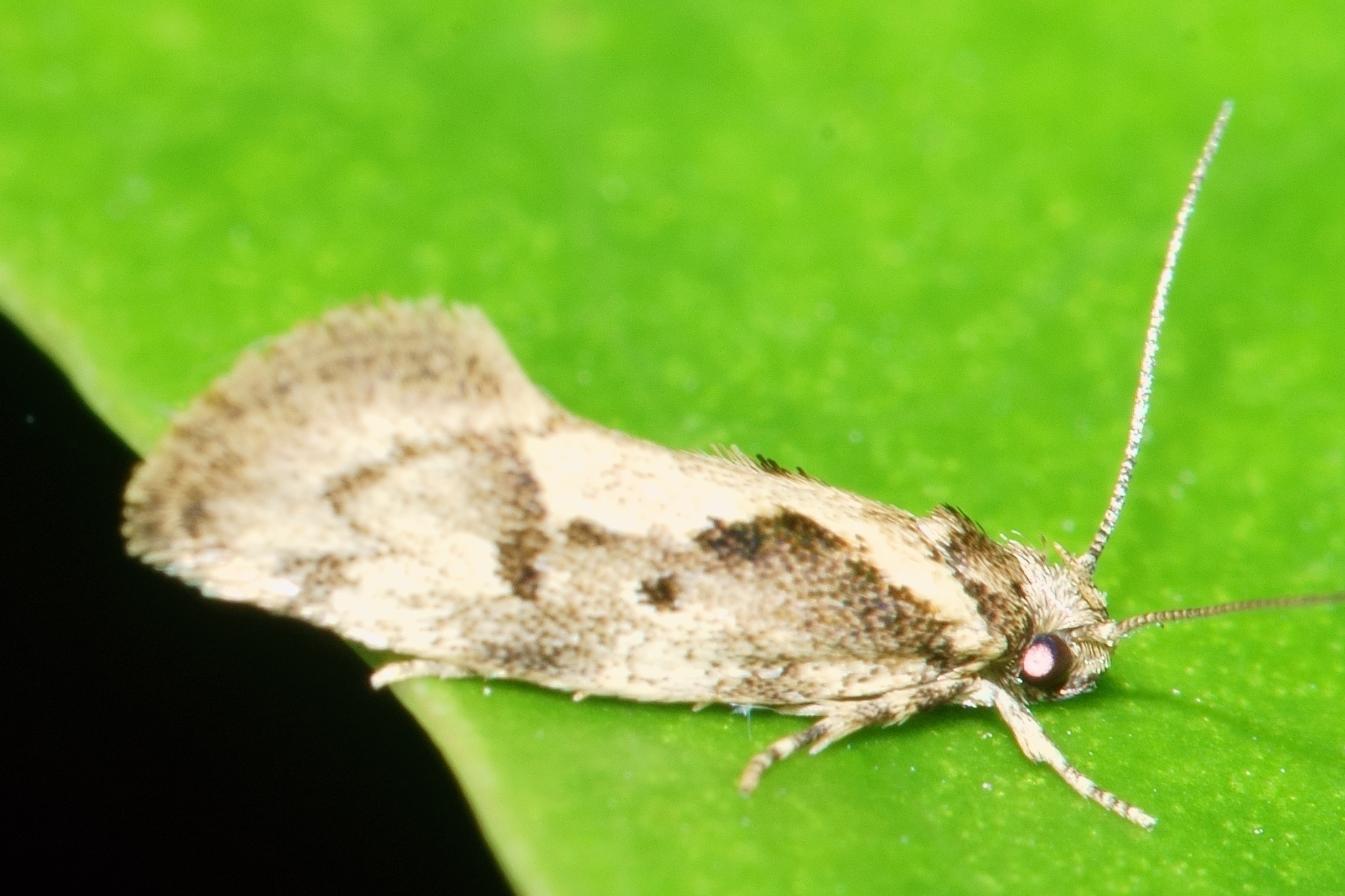

Scientific classification
- Kingdom: Animalia
- Phylum: Arthropoda
- Class: Insecta
- Order: Lepidoptera
- Family: Oecophoridae
- Genus: Tingena
- Species: T. ancogramma

Binomial name
- Tingena ancogramma (Meyrick, 1919)

Synonyms
- Borkhausenia ancogramma Meyrick, 1919; Borkhausenia latens Philpott, 1930; Borkhausenia bellatula Philpott, 1929

= Tingena ancogramma =

Species of moth, endemic to New Zealand

Tingena ancogramma is a species of moth in the family Oecophoridae. It is endemic to New Zealand and has been found in the Hen and Chicken Islands, the North Island and the South Island. Adults are on the wing in summer and autumn and inhabit open areas of forest scrubland.

== Taxonomy ==
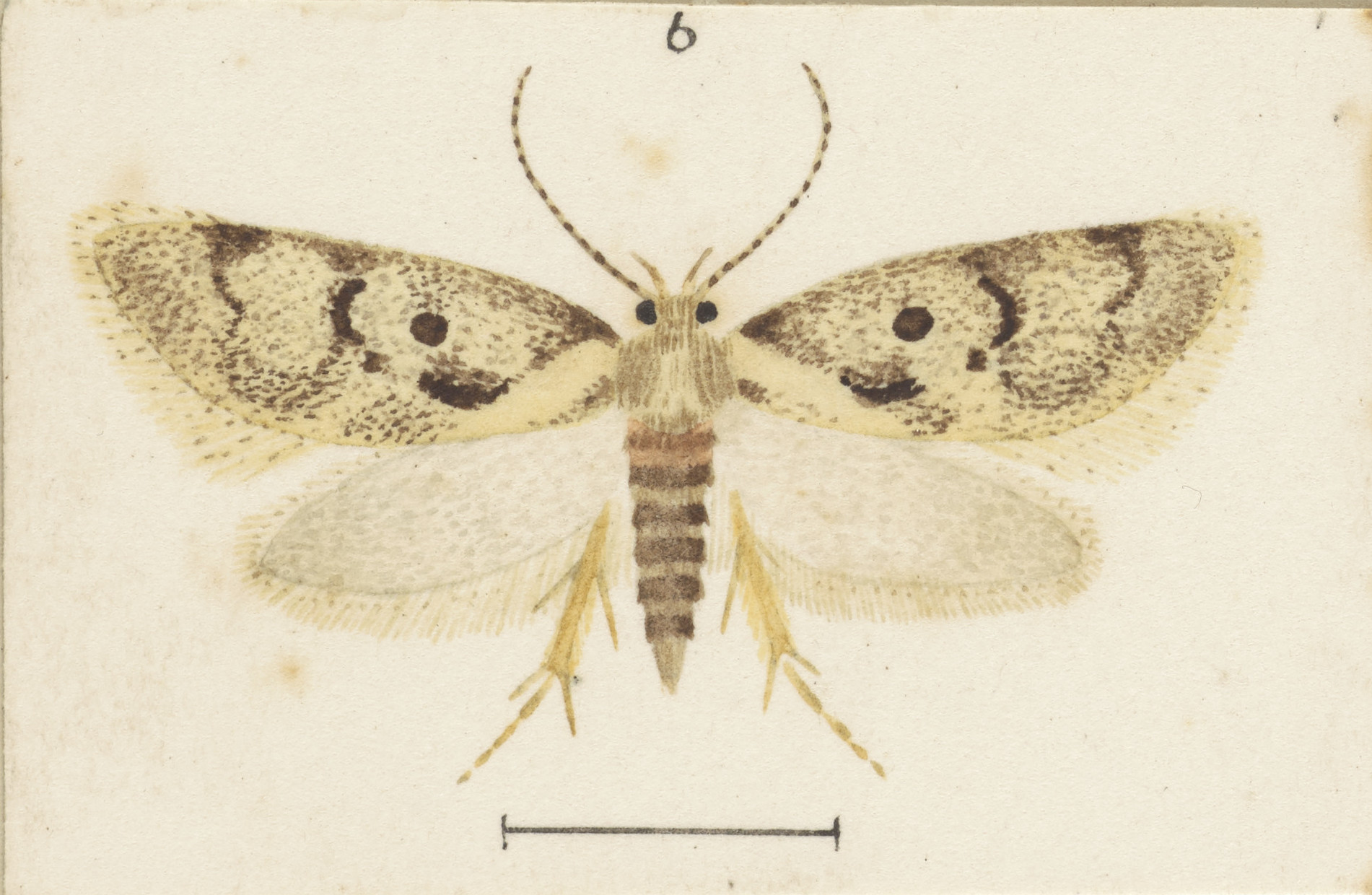
Dubious illustration by George Hudson.

This species was first described by Edward Meyrick in 1919 using a specimen collected by George Hudson at Wainuiomata in December and named Borkhausenia ancogramma. George Hudson discussed and illustrated this species in his 1928 book The butterflies and moths of New Zealand also under the name Borkhausenia ancogramma. In 1939 Hudson synonymised Borkhausenia latens and Borkhausenia bellatula with this species. In 1988 J. S. Dugdale placed this species in the genus Tingena and confirmed synonyms established by Hudson. When discussing Hudson's illustration of this species Dugdale argued that it should be regarded as dubious as the illustration "has a dark patch on the dorsum just before the tornus which is lacking in the holotype". The holotype specimen is held at the Natural History Museum, London.

== Description ==
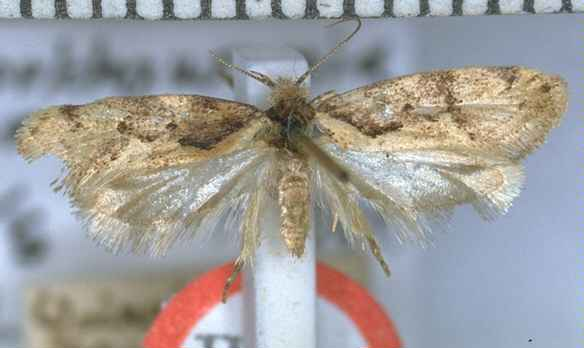
Male holotype of T. ancogramma.

Meyrick described this species as follows:

♂. 16 mm. Head ochreous-grey-whitish sprinkled with fuscous. Palpi ochreous-whitish, basal half of second joint and a subapical ring dark fuscous, terminal joint 2/3 of second, with dark-fuscous subbasal and subapical rings. Antennal ciliations under 1. Thorax fuscous somewhat mixed with ocherous-grey-whitish, suffused with dark fuscous towards margins. Abdomen whitish-ochreous mixed with light-brownish. Forewings elongate, costa gently arched, apex obtuse, termen rounded, rather strongly oblique; pale ochreous irregularlv sprinkled with light-brownish and a few dark-fuscous scales; a thick dorsal streak of pale ground-colour from base to near tornus, sprinkled with light fuscous on a patch beyond middle and with dark fuscous on dorsal edge towards base, margined above by an obtusely angulated dark- fuscous streak (suffused above with fuscous) from base of costa to plical stigma, posteriorly rather expanded and with a short prominence beneath second discal stigma, extremity obliquely truncate, surrounded posteriorly with fuscous suffusion and some dark-fuscous scales; stigmata dark fuscous, plical rather obliquely before first discal, second discal transverse, an additional cloudv dot on margin of dorsal streak between first and second discal; blotches of fuscous suffusion on costa at \ and middle, latter connected by second discal stigma with dark posterior margin of dorsal streak : a fuscous spot on costa at a, with very faint indications of subterminal line; two cloudv fuscous costal dots near apex : cilia whitish-ochreous speckled with light-brownish. Hindwings very pale greyish : cilia whitish-ochreous.

== Distribution ==
It is endemic to New Zealand and found in the Hen and Chickens Islands, the North Island and the South Island. It has been observed at its type locality of Wainuiomata as well as at Porirua in the Wellington region, at the Hen and Chickens Islands, Whangārei, Rotorua and at Lake Rotoroa in the South Island.

== Behaviour ==
This adults of this species are on the wing from late summer to autumn and have been collected from December to February.

== Habitat ==
This species inhabits open areas in forest scrubland.
