= New Zealand Arthropod Collection =

Invertebrate collection in New Zealand

- Ko te Aitanga Pepeke o Aotearoa
- Established: 1920s
- Location: 231 Morrin Rd, St Johns, Auckland 1072, New Zealand
- Coordinates: 36°53′00″S 174°50′56″E
- Collection size: 7 million specimens
- Website: www.landcareresearch.co.nz/resources/collections/nzac

The New Zealand Arthropod Collection is a collection of terrestrial invertebrates held by Maanaki Whenua – Landcare Research in Auckland, New Zealand. It specialises in the taxonomy and identification of indigenous and exotic invertebrate species in New Zealand, and is one of New Zealand's Nationally Significant Collections and Databases.

The NZAC provides identification guides to the public in the form of insect factsheets, the "What is this bug" website, and illustrations by Des Helmore.

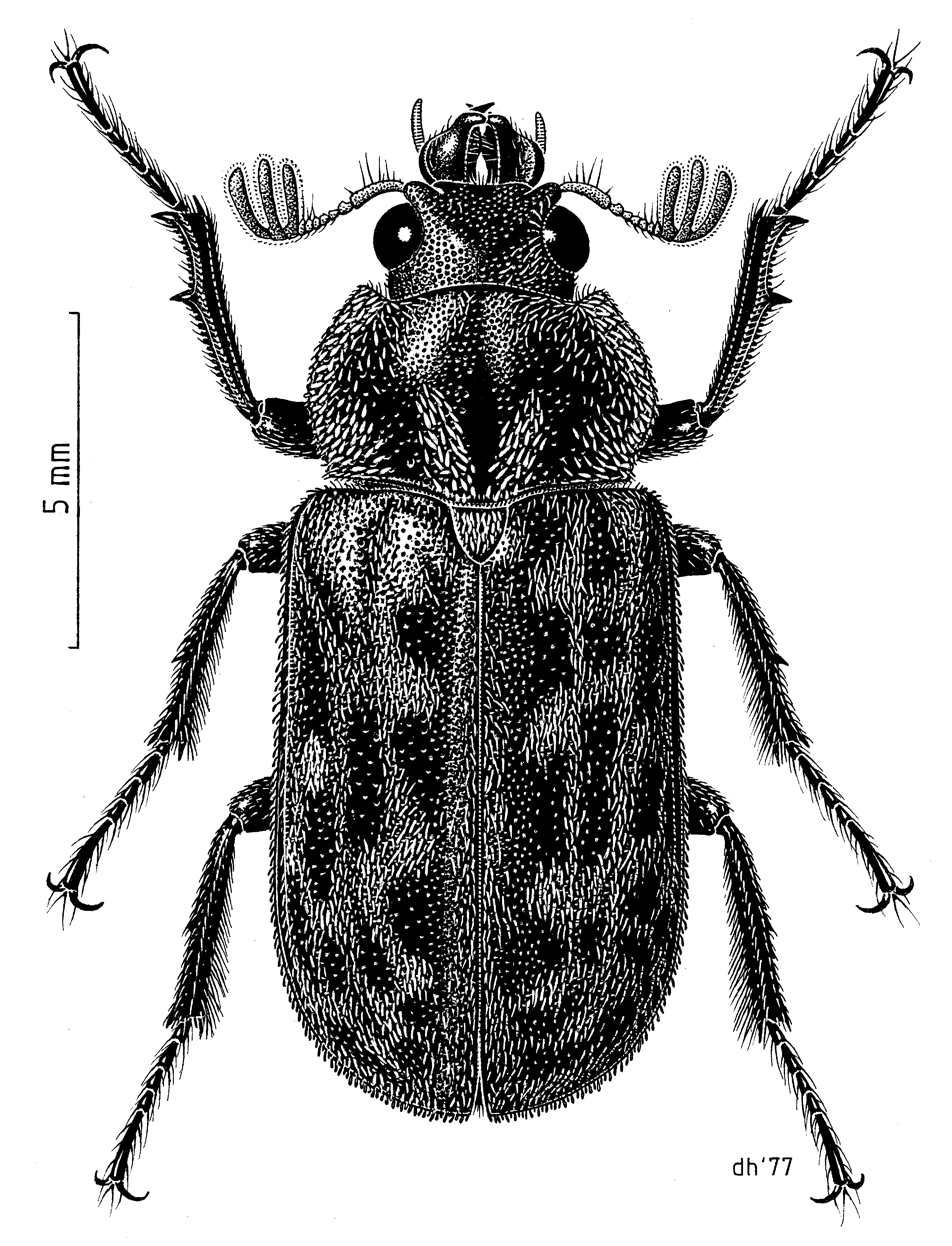
Mitophyllus parrianus

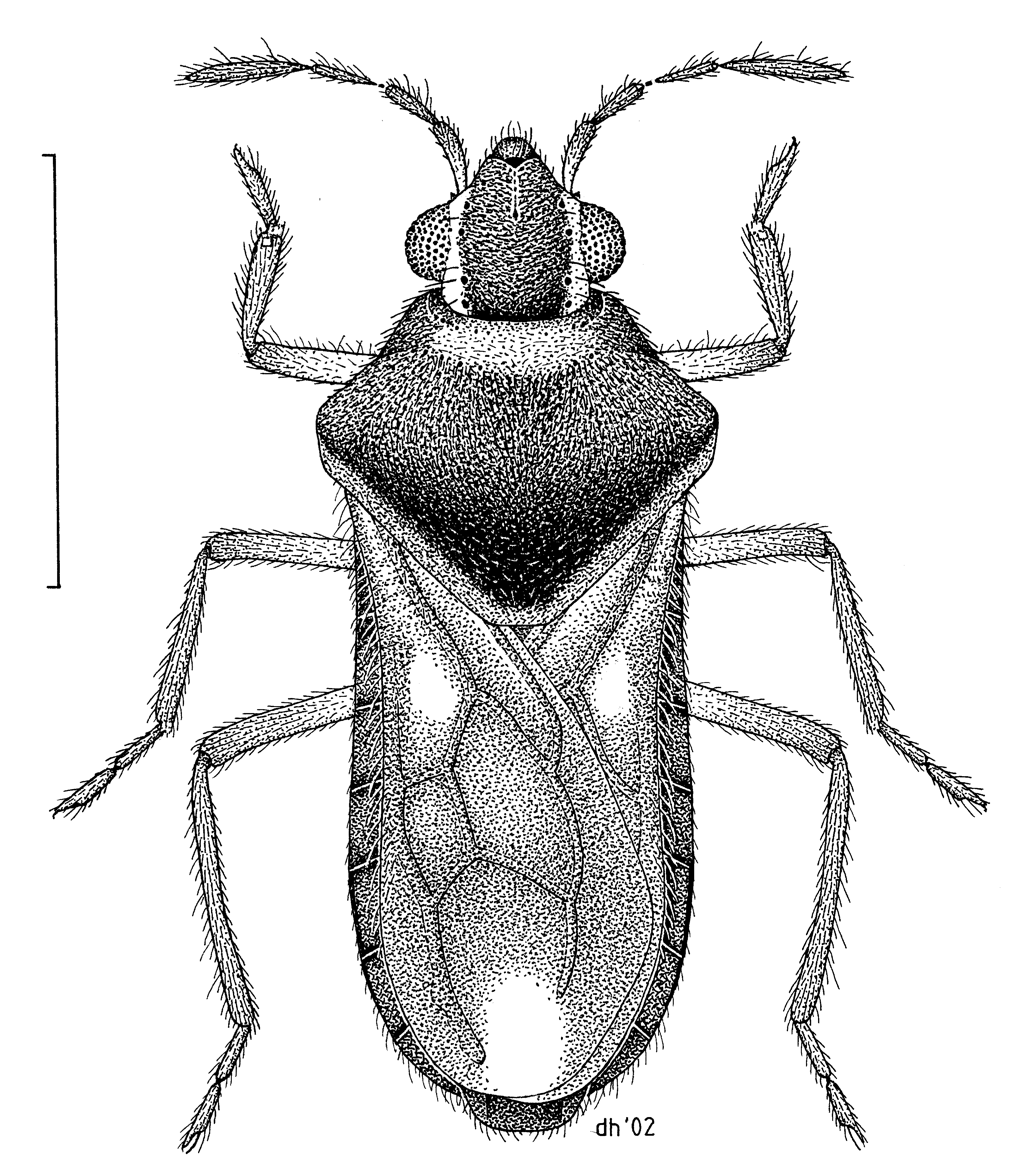
Microvelia macgregori

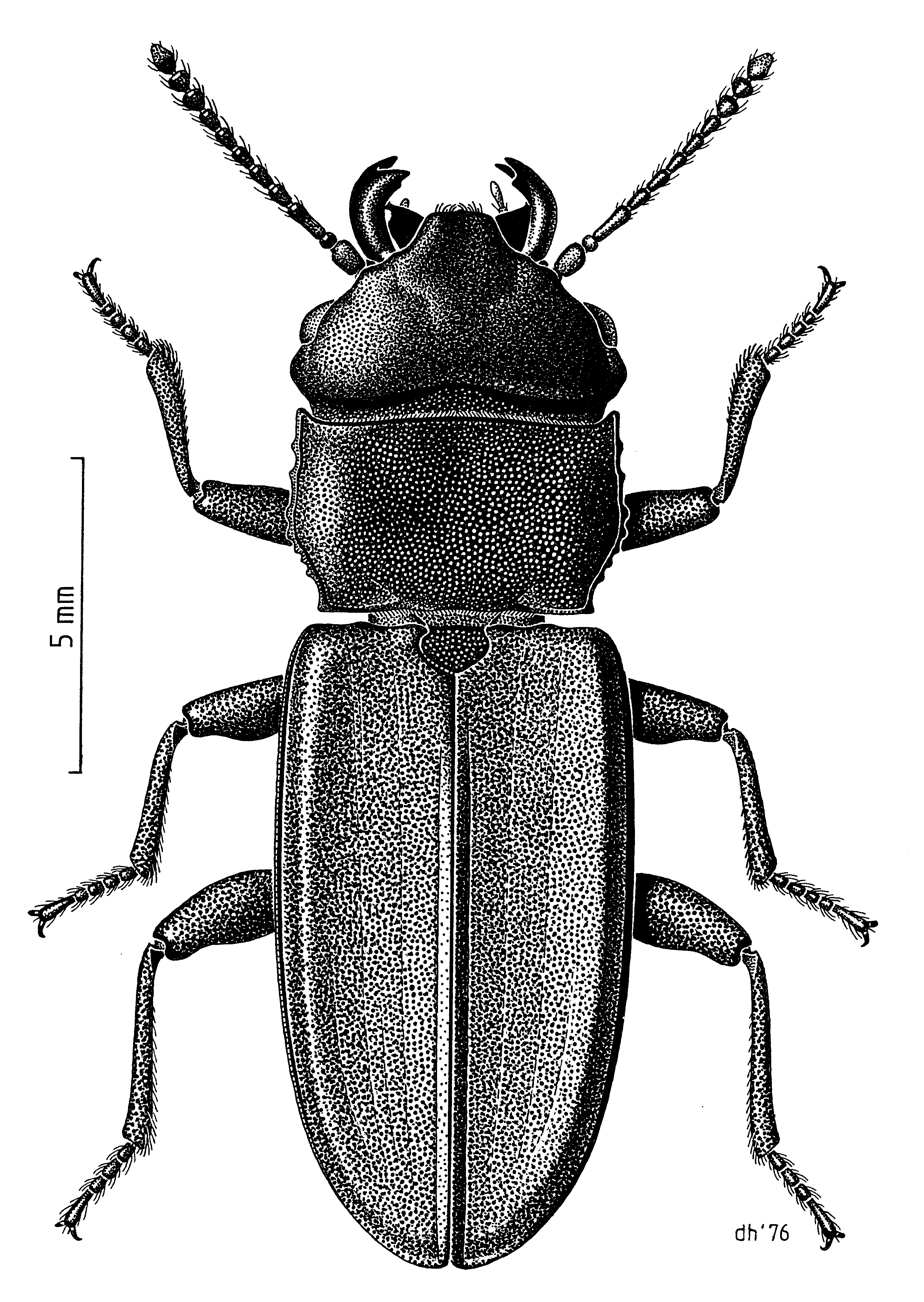
Platisus zelandicus

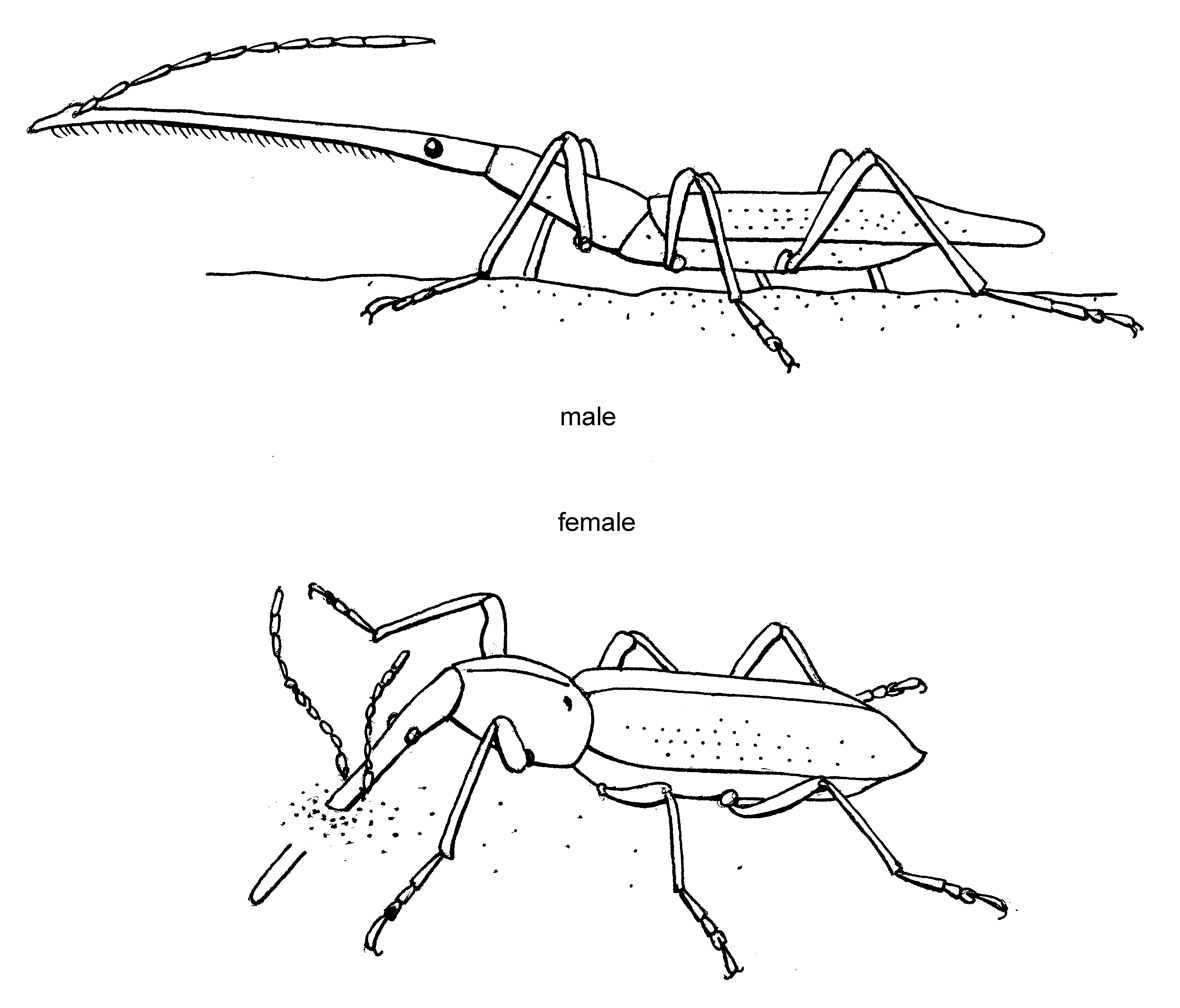
Lasiorhynchus barbicornis
