= Fungi of New Zealand =

Fungi of Aotearoa

The fungi of New Zealand consist of an estimated 20,000 to 22,000 species, of which only 34% are known. There is a high diversity of New Zealand native fungi, with about 1,100 species occurring in association with native Nothofagus or Metrosideros. About a third of the known species are exotic, having been introduced by humans.

Worldwide there is estimated to be over 1.5 million species according to the Hawksworth ratio of 1:6 (vascular plants to fungi). However, worldwide only 5% of these taxa have been classified and extreme environments remain understudied. Of these known species there are 3,000 edible mushrooms, of which 200 are eaten by humans.

All around the world mushrooms are prized as nutritious, tasty, and bioactive. New Zealand is no different. Humans settled in New Zealand after fungi had already established and began their settlement in conjunction with these organisms, first used by indigenous Māori. This has resulted in rich and persistent cultural use with an understanding of both endemic and introduced fungi. Māori use of fungi as both food and medicine is under-researched but can be found in the folklore and names that accompany native mushrooms. Their medicinal value in society has persisted, with compounds found in mushrooms making up 25% of molecules used by pharmaceutical companies.

As more people have made their way to New Zealand, so have many introduced species, some which have adapted well and became foraging favourites, while others, like black truffles (Tuber melanosporum), have struggled to form associations with native plants, but could have high economic value.

Manaaki Whenua – Landcare Research holds the New Zealand Fungarium, one of the largest public collections in the southern hemisphere. Manaaki Whenua has over 100,000 fungal specimens (109,584 listed in 2023), including all type specimens in New Zealand, and some specimens from the wider Pacific.

== Edible fungi ==
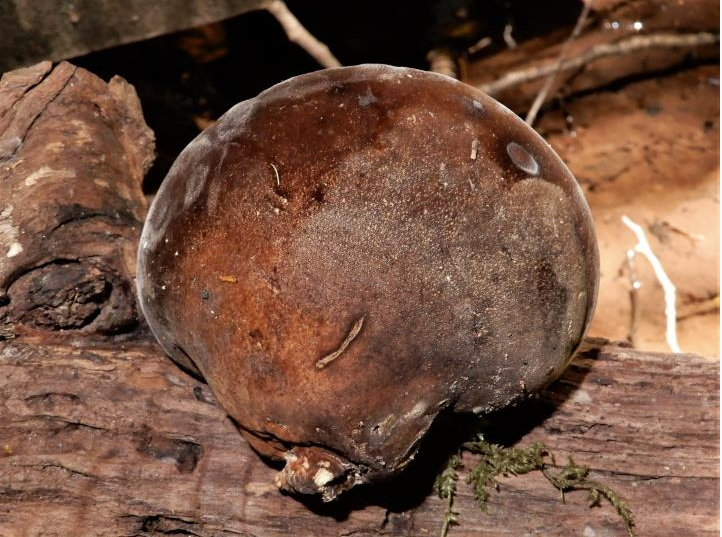
Laetiporus portentosus (pūtawa): Order / Polyporales; Family / Laetiporaceae

=== Te pūtawa, Laetiporus portentosus ===
One of the many species that grow on native beech (Nothofagus) trees, pūtawa grows on dead logs for weeks until it reaches its maximum size. Found in the North Island and locally just north of Christchurch in the South Island, this bracket fungi can grow up to 30 cm across and 6 cm thick. Māori used these fungi as a fire starter when moving around, as the fungus burns very slowly and is hard to put out, requiring complete smothering. Similar species found elsewhere in the world have been known to have this same purpose – including lighting cigarette papers. There are records of this fungus being used for medicinal purposes, specifically to maintain pressure on bleeding wounds with strips of pūtawa acting as a naturally absorbent and elastic bandage. Because this species falls from their host when mature, this has made getting a reliable sequence in the New Zealand Fungarium collections difficult.

=== Fungus icicles: Hericium novae-zealandiae, pekepeke-kiore ===
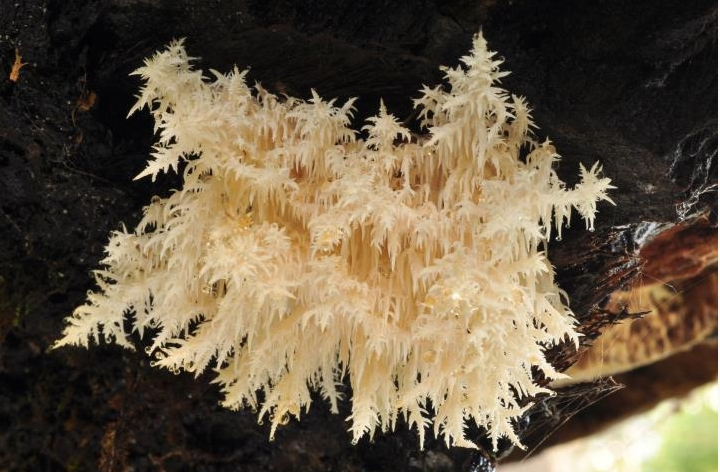
Hericium novae-zealandiae, pekepeke-kiore: Order / Russulales; Family / Hericiaceae

Hericium novae-zealandiae, Pekepeke-kiore in Māori, or fungus icicles more commonly, can grow between 5–25 cm in diameter. They are found in the autumn months of the Southern Hemisphere (March–July) and were harvested by Indigenous Māori as a food source. This fungus is a decomposer, breaking own dead wood to provide energy to create its unique fruiting bodies on rotting trees. This mushroom has been experimented on both in cuisine and medicine with potential antibacterial properties.

The closely related Herecium erinaceus (Lion's Mane) is a popular mushroom found on sawdust in Asia, suggesting that Pekepeke-kiore may have been eaten in New Zealand prior to colonial settlement, but there are few accounts to back this up. This Hericium species has been named by both Pakeha and Māori for its distinctive fruiting bodies which appear like white icicles climbing along the forest floor and rotting logs. Its Māori name comes from the verb 'pekepeke' meaning to jump and the noun 'kiore' which is a native rat in New Zealand – describing its furry texture and sporadic network.

Related to Lion's mane, there is support that this fungus improves cognitive functioning and nerve regeneration.

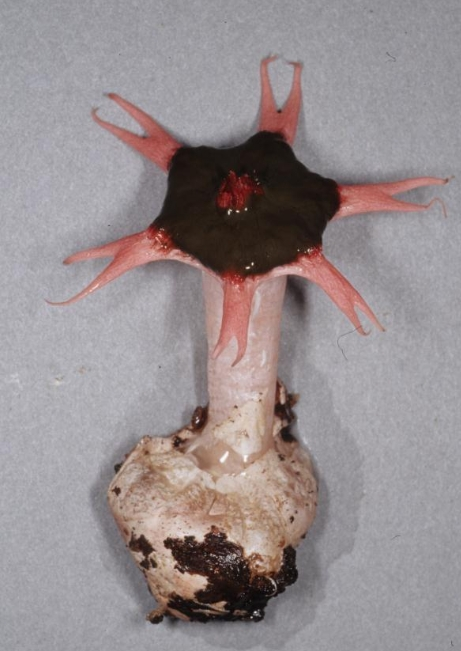
Aseroe Rubra, Flower Fungus: Order / Phallales; Family / Clathraceae

=== Flower fungus: Aseroë rubra, puapu-a-autahi ===
Looking like starfish, these fungi are bright red and stink and were unlikely to have been eaten often due to their strong smell. When mature these fungi have a slime on their base, called 'gleba' that smells like rotten meat and attracts flies which helps them spread spores. The smell of gleba can last hours when transferred onto other organisms and materials.

They are known commonly as the 'Flower fungus' as it has 5–9 red petal-like arms on its fruiting body which can be seen above its soil substrate. The fruiting body can grow to 80mm long, with a 35mm diameter disc.

This species is no longer common in Aotearoa, but it can be found around the world, common in Australia and South Africa. Aseroë rubra is famous for being the first fungal specimen recorded in Australia on 1 May 1972.

=== Wood ear: Auricularia cornea, hakeke ===
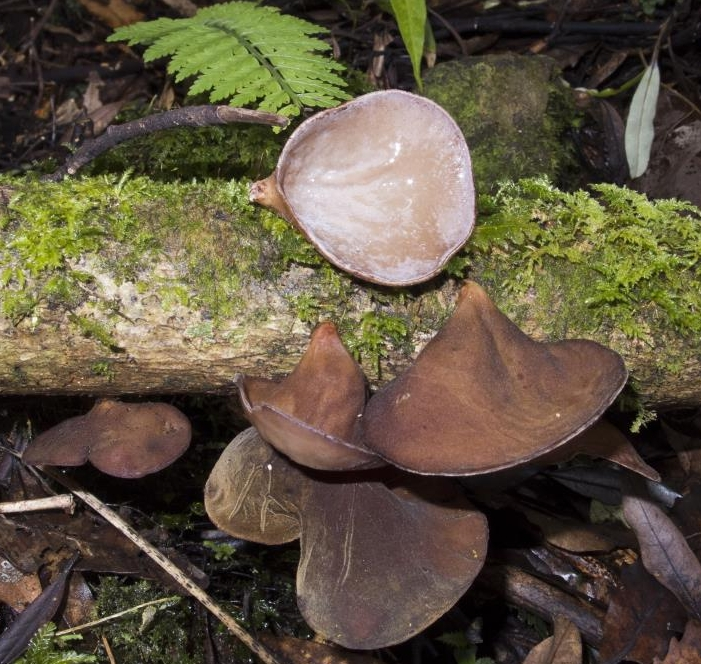
Auricularia Cornea, Wood ear: Order / Auriculariales; Family / Auriculariaceae

Named 'wood ear' because they grow on wood like a rubber ear, lacking both a stipe and gills. This species is common on dead wood and is found in spring, summer, and autumn and can grow from 15 to 20 cm in diameter. Records of moteatea (Māori chants) suggest this food was only eaten in times of famine, as it doesn't have much flavour. Today they are cooked with other food that will give it flavour.

Wood ear also has anecdotal medicinal purposes; in Chinese medicine it is used to lower body heat and strengthen blood vessels and the cardiovascular system when treating colds and fevers. Māori use Hakeke as a treatment when recovering from karaka (Corynocarpus laevigatus) or tutu (Coriaria arborea) poisoning as it grows on these trees.

Hakeke was a prized export trade in New Zealand from 1870 to 1900 with China, creating a source of income in New Zealand. So lucrative as an export trade it was dubbed 'Taranaki wool' as it was just as profitable as the New Zealand wool trade overseas. This trade is no longer present, instead hakeke from Chinese commercial farms is often imported into New Zealand.

=== Poplar mushroom: Cyclocybe parasitica, tawaka ===
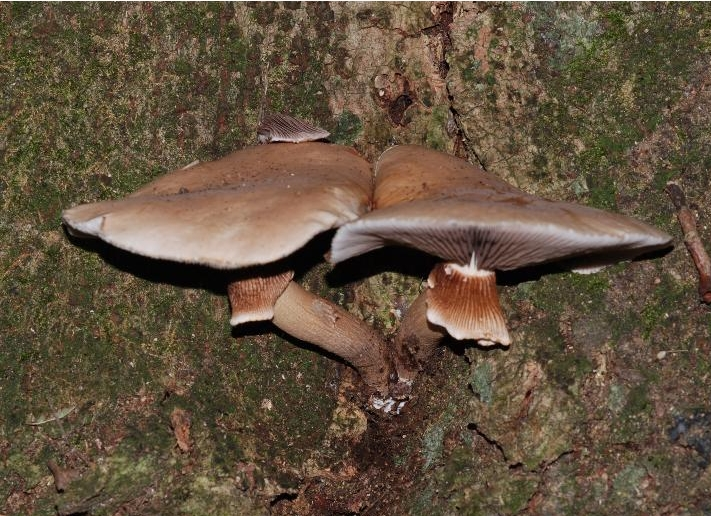
Cyclocybe parasitica, Tawaka: Order / Agaricales; Family / Tubariaceae

Known as Tawaka in Te Reo Māori, this mushroom has been recorded growing on both dead and living trees from late summer to autumn, predominantly in the South Island. Tawaka is parasitic to several native and introduced species and is identified by a hanging 'veil' which drops when the fruiting body matures. The fruiting body can be between 8–12 cm in diameter and has history as both food and medicine. Tawaka is eaten by steaming the fungus.

Oral history dictates that Tawaka can be given to treat fevers, pregnant women, and to treat karaka and tutu poisoning. Alongside these believed medicinal benefits, Māori believe that eating Tawaka before gardening will cause gourd crops to die – however, there is not imperial evidence to support this yet.

The first records of this fungus in New Zealand by Colenso incorrectly identified it as Agaricus pudicus. This was not re-evaluated until 1982 by Stevenson, thanks to illustrated drawings by John Buchanan which did not match the species description Tawaka had been assigned to. It was common for this to happen as botanists were from the Northern Hemisphere with extensive records, most of which are similar but not the same as the biota found in New Zealand.

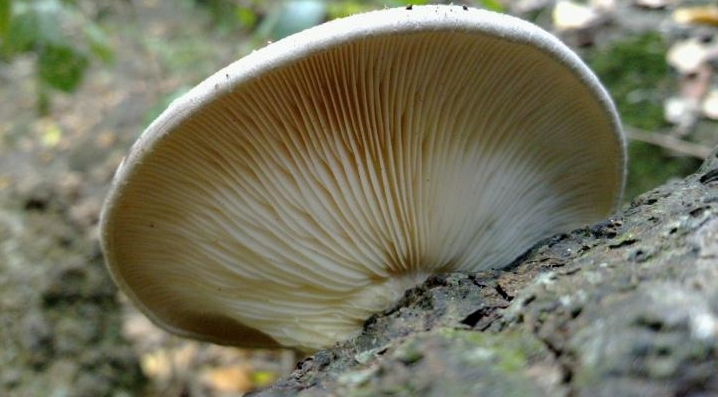
Brown Oyster Mushroom, Pleurotus australis: Order / Agaricales; Family / Pleurotaceae

=== Brown oyster: Pleurotus australis ===
Another edible native fungus is the brown oyster mushroom, part of the genus Pleurotus, which are favoured for eating as they are less slimy when cooked. This fungus grows mainly on manuka (Leptospermum scoparium) and native bush but can be found growing in the roots of trees either solitary or in clusters. These can be found in Australia, New Zealand, and Malaysia. Their general distribution is in the North Island of New Zealand, but there have been sightings of them in the upper South Island.

They are named after oysters for their slight fishy tase and shell-like appearance due to an inrolled margin when growing.

=== Velvet shank: Flammulina velutipes ===
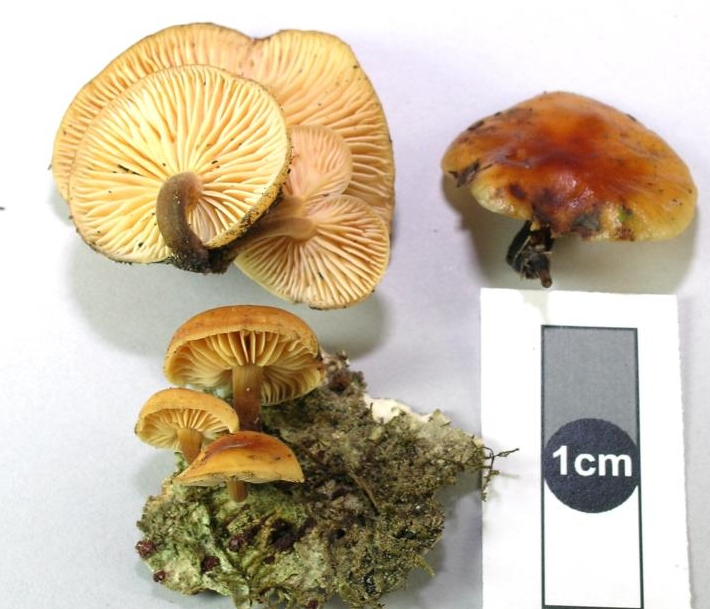
Flammulina velutipes, Velvet Shank: Order / Agaricales; Family / Physalacriaceae

The velvet shank group are winter species that can survive being frozen. This fungus can be found in the native bush of every region of New Zealand except Northland. The caps range from 3–9 cm in diameter, and form fruiting bodies from April to September.

The New Zealand variation is closely related to enoki, despite having very different phenotypes. Enoki and the velvet shank taste similar, with enoki being commercially cultivated in China for over 1000 years. Velvet shank can be mistaken for the poisonous funeral bell (Galerina marginata).

=== Giant puffballs: Calvatia gigantea, pukurau ===
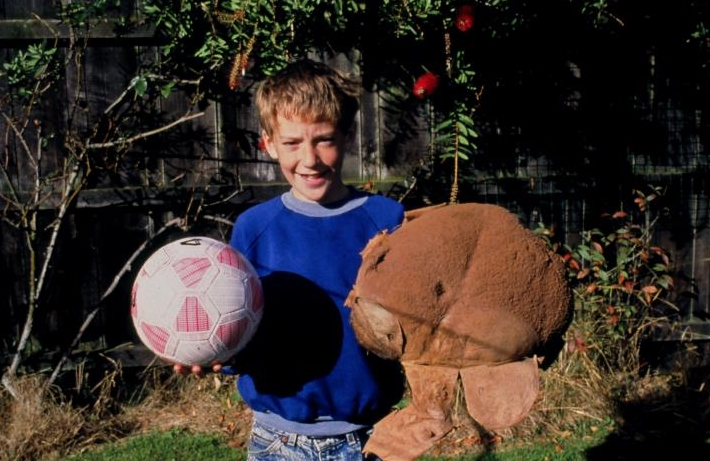
Calvatia gigantea, pukurau, next to a football: Order / Agaricales; Family / Lycoperdaceae

Giant puffballs can grow up to 50 cm. The largest recorded puffball in New Zealand weighed 7 kg. They tend to grow in open areas like fields and gardens in summer and autumn months throughout the world. While these puffballs can grow large, like other Calvatia species they should only be consumed when young before they turn brown and begin releasing spores. This species is commonly eaten and used as off-label treatment, but when consumed mature they can cause gastrointestinal infections and acute respiratory disease (when consumed in large amounts).

They have a spongy texture and a nutty flavour which meant they were both eaten by Māori and used as bandages on bleeding and burn wounds for its styptic qualities. They have an anaesthetic compound making them useful for beekeeping, as tumour suppressants, with bioactivity that acts as an anaesthetic, antioxidant, anti-cancer, and antidiabetic. Because of these qualities they are the most bioactive species in the Calvatia group, but all the species contain Calvatic acid, making this genus a common occurrence in indigenous cultures for food and medicine.

Mice studies have shown giant puffballs to be a potential tumour-suppressant but has not yet been approved as a therapeutic option outside of these mice trials. These puffballs are a common source of treatment for diabetics as they are low in sugar but can block 50% of the enzymatic activity which causes diabetes symptoms. This helps regulate blood sugar and insulin in the body.

Known as pukurau by Māori, this fungus is particularly abundant in Waipukurau, along the river for which it is named. The name translating to 'water of pukurau', the river being used to wash the puffballs before they were eaten.

There are four species of Calvatia in New Zealand, suspected to be self-introduced: Calvatia gigantea and three variations of Calvatia craniiformis.

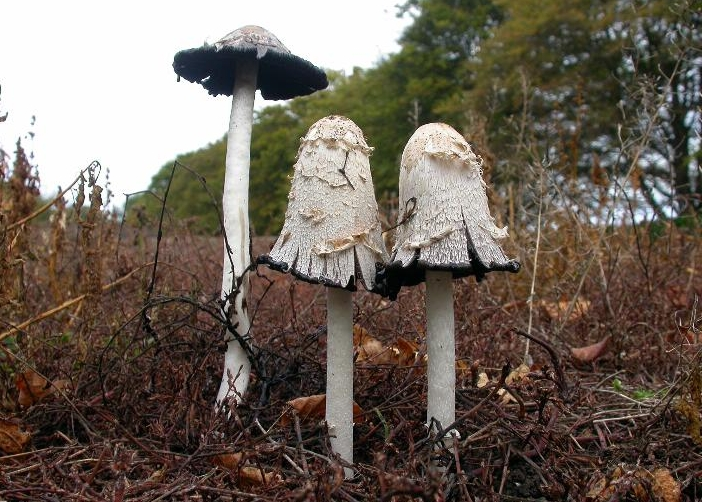
Shaggy inkcap Coprinus comatus: Order / Agaricales; Family / Coprinaceae

=== Coprinus comatus, shaggy inkcap ===
These distinctive white fungi grow in disturbed soil from February to June all across New Zealand. Their caps are longer than they are wide-ranging from 4–8 cm across and 6–20 cm tall and a stipe of 6–40 cm long. This fungus gains its name from a process called autodigestion: the cap emerges in the morning and then begins dropping spores dissolving from the bottom upwards as it does so. This is to help the spore propagate with wind before the fruiting body disintegrates.

These mushrooms are edible, but they have a very short mature phase, requiring immediate harvest as the cap opens within a few hours and starts dropping spores. This mushroom is commonly consumed in Asian countries and has been found to have medicinal benefits such as antioxidant, anti-inflammatory, antibiotic, and antibacterial qualities.

=== Fairy ring champignon: Marasmius oreades ===
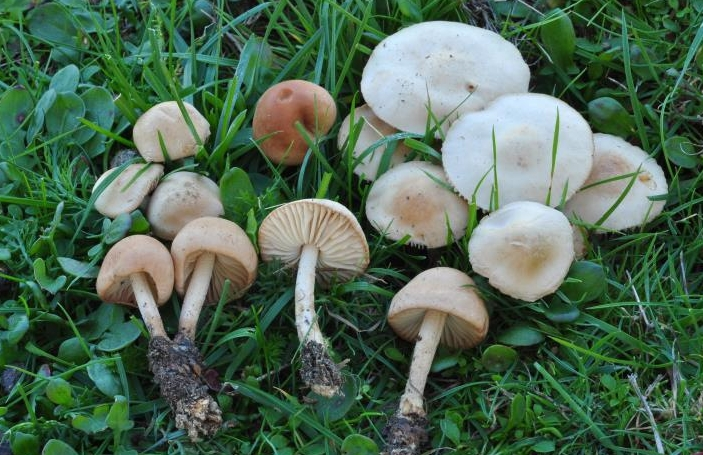
Fairy Ring Champignon, Marasmius oreades: Order / Agaricales; Family / Marasmiaceae

Also known as 'Scotch Bonnets', these are found from November through May in New Zealand. These small mushrooms average 8 cm tall and are named for their unique distribution. Fairy ring mushrooms form distinctive rings in open fields. There are many stories about this phenomenon such as a witch's dance floor, or even dragon scorch marks. These circles are formed by a single fungus with a mycelium network that radiates outward for nutrients. When this fungus dies, these mushrooms will pop up again in ring at the edge of the previous mycelium when the conditions are supportive to produce fruiting bodies. Each year the ring will get larger in diameter, sometimes as large as 600m.

A unique feature of this species is that they can dry out and rehydrate multiple times, this has been attributed to high concentrations of the sugar trehalose. There is ongoing research into how these mushrooms maintain genetic integrity as the fruiting bodies produced by the mycelia are genetically homogenous.

These are a popular mushroom in cuisine because they grow in large cohorts and only take a couple of hours to dehydrate in sunlight due to their small size. They have an almond-like flavour and are sometimes used in desserts as well as savoury dishes.

=== Field mushroom: Agaricus campestris group ===
Also known as paddock mushrooms, these 'fieldies' are found in pastures all around New Zealand. They are closely related to the commercialised white button mushroom (Agaricus bisporus). Currently there is not a definitive list of known agaric species in New Zealand, and identification of these mushrooms has to be done at the microscopic level.

New Zealanders have foraged for these mushrooms for generations. Due to misidentification of the well-known and look-a-like death cap (Amanita phalloides) as 'fieldies' the number of mushroom poisonings in adults has increased.

These mushrooms have traditionally been used to treat diabetes due to its insulin releasing properties to counter hyperglycaemia.

=== Horse mushroom: Agaricus arvensis group ===
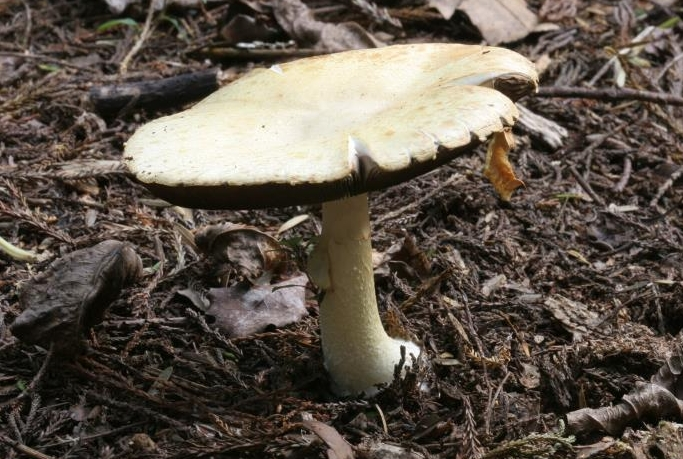
Horse mushroom, Agaricus arvensis: Order / Agaricales; Family / Agaricaceae

The horse mushroom is named so because it grows where horses graze; in paddocks and fields as these tend to be high in nitrogen. These mushrooms often grow in groups and can also form fairy rings is thought to deplete water, potassium, and respiration rates in the 'scorched' zone of fairy rings.

Horse mushrooms are large, 5–12 cm long and up to a 20 cm diameter cap. These fungi can be found from September to May and are used in savoury cuisine similar to field mushrooms.

=== Birch bolete: Leccinum scabrum ===
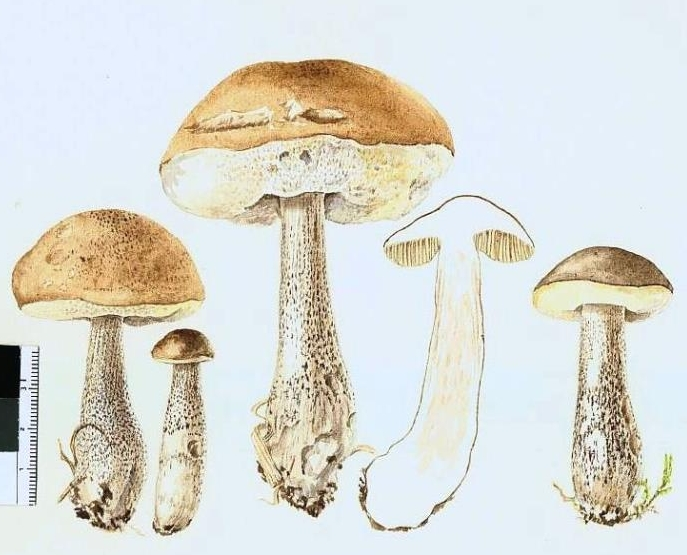
Birch Bolete, Leccinum scabrum, Watercolour by G. M. Taylor: Order / Boletales; Family / Boletaceae

The birch bolete has been named due to its host species, birch trees (Betula sp.) in New Zealand it only associates with the silver birch (Betula pendula). This fungi fruits multiple times in a season and has a cap size from 5–11 cm across. They grow in urban areas across New Zealand except Northland. This species is common in the Northern Hemisphere in Europe and Asia, and was likely introduced to both Australia and New Zealand, where they are now common.

While not popular to eat in New Zealand, birch boletes are easy to find and are commonly eaten in Finland and Russia. However, some research has flagged that these mushrooms are potentially poisonous and should be treated with caution and thoroughly cooked before consumption.

The birch bolete has shown anti-microbial activity against human pathogens when in aqueous solution and has been proposed as a potential solution to increasing antibiotic resistance in pathogens.

=== Slippery jacks: Suillus granulatus; Suillus luteus ===
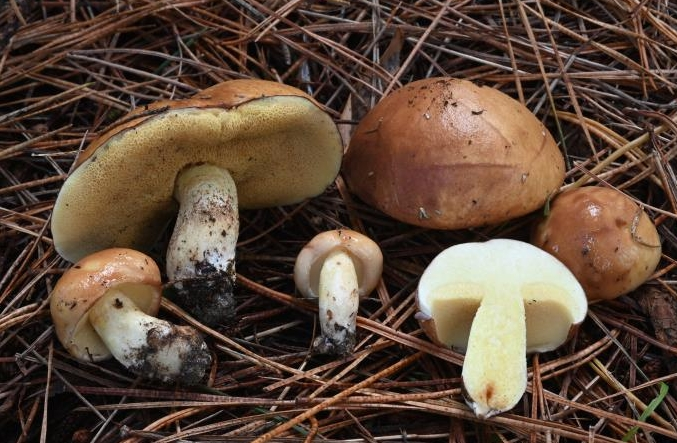
Slippery Jacks, Suillus granulatus: Order / Boletales; Family / Suillaceae

These boletes are similar to birch boletes and are not sought after for their taste, but they are edible and tend to grow in large groups. They are recognisable due to their varying shades of yellow.

There are four species in the Suillus genus that grow in association with Pinus radiata in New Zealand and are found January through July all around New Zealand.

This mushroom is common throughout the Northern Hemisphere and is under research for antioxidant potential like many other fungi.

=== Peppery bolete: Chalciporus piperatus ===
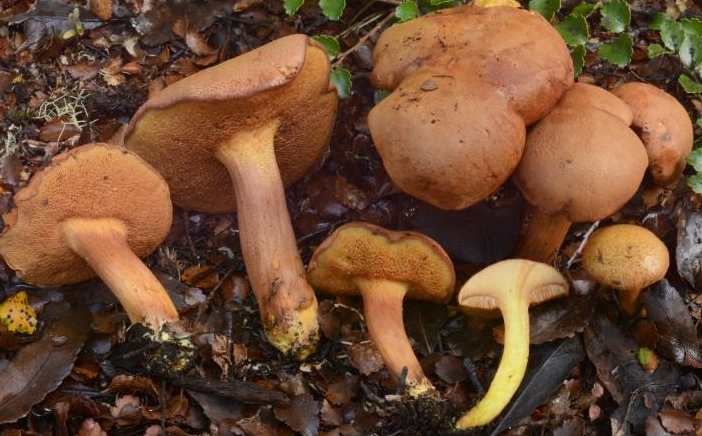
Chalciporus piperatus, Peppery bolete: Order / Boletales; Family / Boletaceae

Named for their spicy taste, Peppery boletes are found from January to June in the more temperate parts of New Zealand; excluding Northland and Gisborne. This species was accidentally introduced to Australia and subsequently New Zealand with their host species Pinus radiata.

Their peppery taste has been attributed to 2H-azepines chalciporone 66 found within the fruiting body. Pepper Boletes are thought to be parasitic, host-specific with the Fly agaric (Amanita muscaria) as they occupy the same environments. They should only be eaten in small quantities and can cause gastric issues if not cooked thoroughly.

These boletes have also been used to make yellow, orange, and green dies when combined with specific compounds.

=== Porcini: Boletus edulis ===
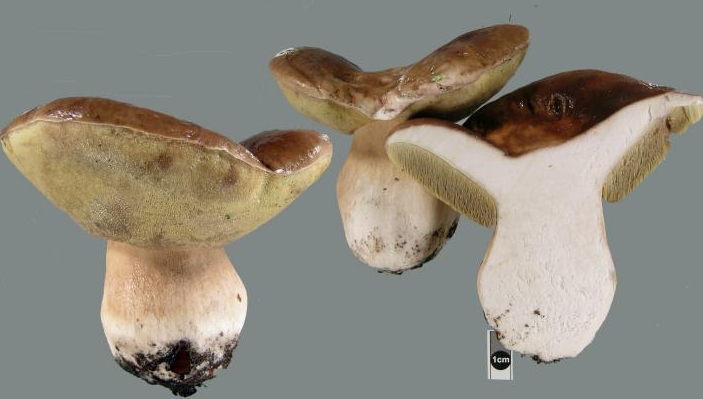
Porcini, Boletus edulis: Order / Boletales; Family / Boletaceae

Porcini are highly sought after by chefs and foragers for their unique taste. Their Italian common name means 'little pig' These mushrooms are introduced to New Zealand from England when curating Hagley Park in Christchurch where they can grow up to 30 cm tall with 25 cm caps. They are now found in urbanised areas such as Wellington, Canterbury, and Dunedin. They are often in company with the toxic fly agaric and are much duller than these cohabitants.

Alongside numerous flavour compounds, this fungus also contains several bioactive compounds. This makes the mushroom a potential for nutraceuticals with its antioxidant, anti-inflammatory, and antibacterial properties.

=== Wine cap: Stropharia rugosoannulata ===
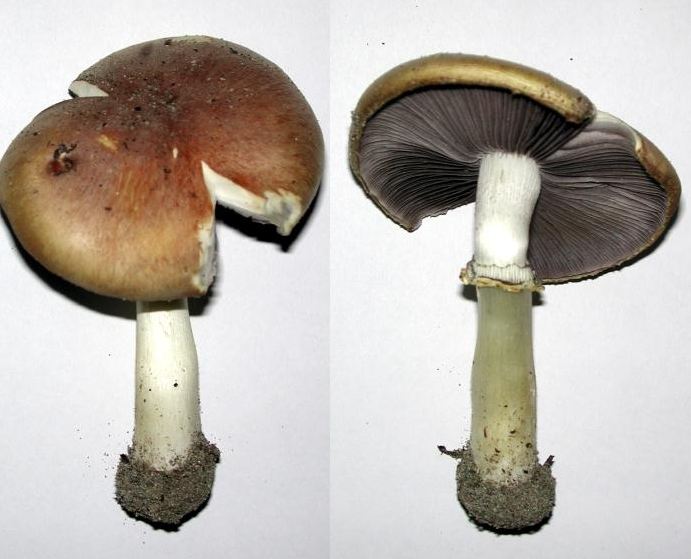
Wine cap, Stropharia rugosoannulata: Order / Agaricales; Family / Strophariaceae

Another species introduced to New Zealand, this fungus is found throughout the North Island and in urbanised parts of the South Island, often growing on mulch in warmer months of the year. These edible mushrooms are sought after for their large caps which can grow up to 30 cm in diameter.

Wine caps have been found to help alleviate cancer progression and are recommended for consumption by the United Nations Food and Agriculture Association. First domesticated in Germany, it is now sought after in China for its bioactive compounds and high yield with easy cultivation.

=== Wood blewit: Lepista nuda ===
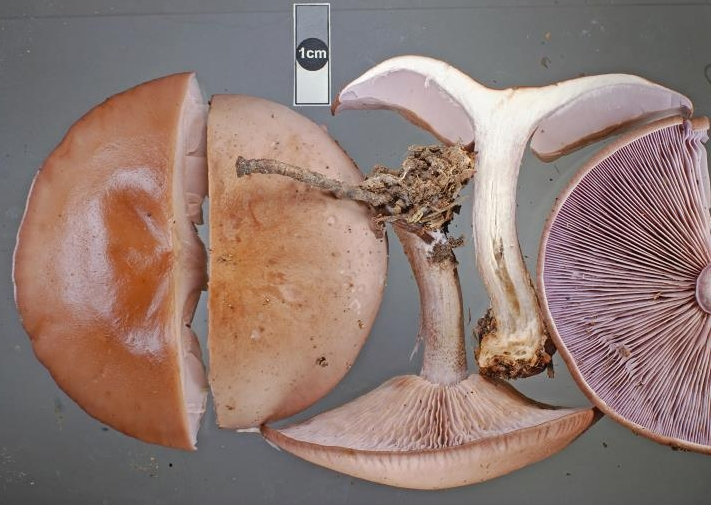
Lepista nuda, Wood Blewit: Order / Agaricales; Family / Clitocybaceae

The wood blewit can be found in dense leaf litter around urban areas, found in Auckland, Waikato, Manawatu, Wellington, Nelson, Tasman, Marlborough, Canterbury, and Otago. With a cap diameter of 4–15 cm this blewit is relatively large and is under research for antimicrobial and antioxidant compounds. Aside from these medicinal qualities, this mushroom is eaten around the world and noted for its sweet, floral flavour.

=== Shaggy parasols: Chlorophyllum brunneum/rachodes ===
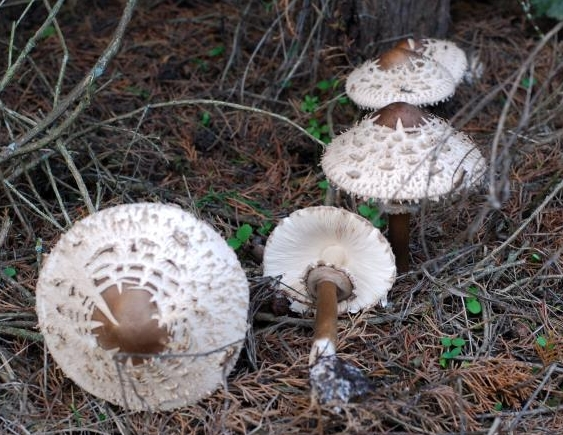
Chlorophyllum brunneum, Shaggy Parasol: Order / Agaricales; Family / Agaricaceae

There are two Chlorphyllum species in New Zealand which cannot be distinguished by eye. They are found in Northland, Waikato, Manawatu, Wellington, Nelson, Canterbury, Otago, and Southland. These species are edible, but they look similar to many poisonous mushrooms which are also found in New Zealand in similar habitats such as Amanita, Macrolepiota cleandii, Chlorophyllum molybdites. The edible parasols are not to be eaten without caution though, as gastric upset is a side effect from this mushroom in about 4% and they need to be cooked well before eaten. There have been no unique health benefits associated with this species.

=== Black landscaping morel: Morchella importuna ===
The black landscaping morel is under-researched in New Zealand, but it does hold the position as the most expensive mushroom in the world and is considered high in bioactive properties. It has yet to be cultivated with commercial stability as its ideal growing conditions are unknown.

This morel has been found in Europe, Asia, America and Australasia. They grow in September through to December with a cap that can be 3–15 cm high and 2–9 cm wide. In New Zealand they have been seen in urbanised areas.

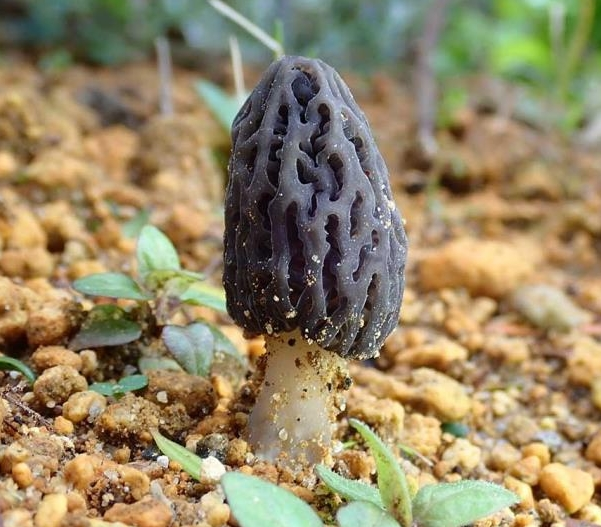
Morchella importuna, Black Landscaping Morel: Order / Pezizales; Family / Morchellaceae

=== Black truffle: Tuber melanosporum ===
There are multiple truffle species found in New Zealand, but the Black truffle is the most frequent and alters the root environment it inhabits. Black truffles have been cultivated commercially in New Zealand since 1993, but only 15% of truffières have been viable resulting in low commercial yield. This is thought to be due to the difference in climatic conditions in New Zealand in comparison to Northern Europe where these truffles are native. There are only three native New Zealand tree species which form ectomycorrhizal associations and with biosecurity limitations, the introduction of new ectomycorrhizal fungi is unlikely and detrimental for truffle growing.

Black truffles are considered a delicacy and have been nicknamed 'Black diamonds' due to their high demand and fickle cultivation nature. There are hopes to increase the truffle trade in New Zealand to export, with 1 kg selling from $2500 to $3500 NZD. Black truffles have not been found associating with native trees in New Zealand, but the tree roots they do associate with can produce 200g to 1 kg when managed appropriately.

There is research underway to help lower the price of truffles by making cultivation more consistent. This research also aims to harness the truffles' antioxidant, antimicrobial, and anticarcinogenic compounds. This is due to the presence of specific bioactive compounds such as ascorbic acid, ergosterol, phenolics, flavonoids, terpenoids, phytosterols, and polysaccharides.

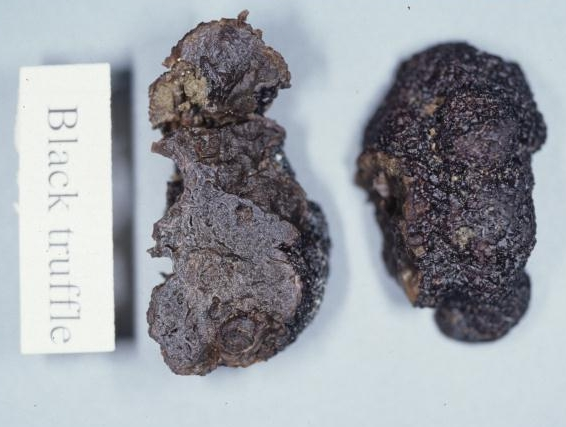
Black truffle, Tuber melanosporum: Order / Pezizales; Family / Tuberaceae

== Fungi biocontrol ==
Biosecurity in New Zealand is strict due to the unique flora, fauna, and fungi found on its isolated shores. However, many introduced species have established both naturally and with anthropogenic aid. For this reason, tightly associated and often host-specific species are reviewed for potential introduction as biocontrol agents. This goes for plants, animals, and even fungi. For biocontrol the species must be deemed to keep the target species abated while also having minimal risk to other cohabitating species which are desirable in comparison to the target. They are not meant to extinguish the weed but reduce its competitive chances against native species. When done with rigorous vetting, biocontrol is a cost-effective method as the species becoming self-maintaining in a much smaller equilibrium than when they are first introduced.

Fungi used as microherbicides in New Zealand are generally native to avoid biosecurity problems from importing exotic species of fungi. These species are often ineffective without management on the weed species due to a limiting factor which impedes their ability to keep the introduced species in check. For this method of biocontrol to be effective the limiting factor of the species needs to be identified and remediated to create a local disease epidemic on the target species. Microherbicides are effective biocontrol fungi as they are ephemeral and localised to where they are introduced, requiring physical contact with the weed to be effective, with an inability to cover long distances unaided. These are preferential to a chemical herbicide when a species-specific approach is needed, often when taxonomically similar crops are in the same area and a chemical herbicide would decimate all related species.

== Therapeutic fungi ==
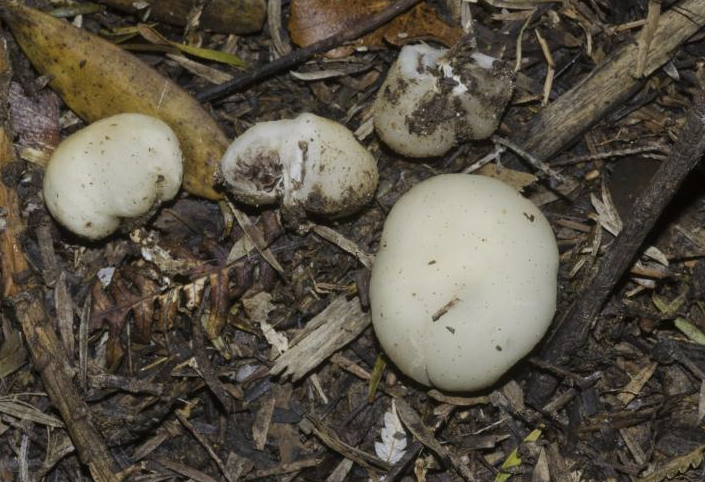
Psilocybe weraroa: Order / Agaricales; Family / Hymenogastraceae

=== Magic mushrooms, Pscilocybe ===
The turn of the 21st century has seen an influx in biomedical research involving psychedelic compounds as psychiatry therapeutic tools. Currently countries such as Brazil, Israel, Canada, Spain, Switzerland, the United Kingdom, and the United States are at the forefront of this research with over 50 clinical trials over three years. Despite these numbers, New Zealand has very little research to add to this total, while the research that has been carried out has shown supportive results for its therapeutic value. Currently the government legislation has proven the main block on this research, with an extensive ban placed on psychedelic compound research in the 1960s.

Magic mushrooms have been found as most beneficial as a mental illness treatment when the setting is strictly controlled and led by a clinical therapist. This has been the foundation of New Zealand's only current psychedelic biomedical research, the Tū Wairua project. Tū Wairua is the first research proposal that has been granted a medicinal license for indigenous magic mushrooms with consent from both the New Zealand Ministry of Health and participating iwi and hapu. Utilising the psilocybin compound found in Psilocybe weraroa, this project is creating a homogeny between current biomedical practises and long standing indigenous traditions found both in New Zealand and around the world. Based in Gisborne, New Zealand, this initiative aims to use psilocybin as a therapeutic tool targeting methamphetamine addiction in Māori communities.

However, not all of the research on this native psychedelic mushroom is positive; as psychedelic medicinal therapy research increases, so do the critiques that this research will also increase the risk of potentially harmful self-medication as individuals forage the mushroom for medicinal intent but outside of researched controls. This also poses an added threat as growing and foraging magic mushrooms (Pscilocybe) is illegal in New Zealand and considered a class A drug, carrying a maximum penalty of 6 months for possession or life in prison for distribution.

== Culturally significant fungi ==
=== Vegetable caterpillar – Ophiocordyceps roberstii ===
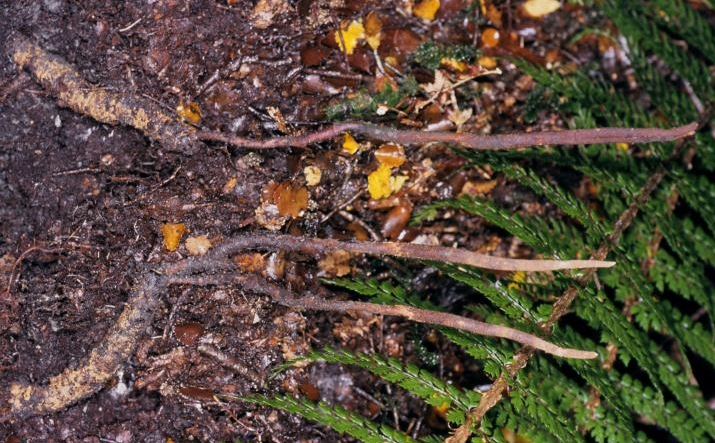
Vegetable caterpillar, Ophiocordyceps roberstii: Order / Hypocreales; Family / Cordycipitaceae

Known as āwheto, the vegetable caterpillar was named so because early ecologists believed that the caterpillar infected was capable of turning into a tree. In reality, this is simply a fungus that infects the caterpillar as a host and uses its body as a source of nutrients to form its fruiting body. The spores sit on leaf litter and wait to be consumed by moth larvae. Then it will parasitise the caterpillars and take over their nervous system causing them to burrow into the ground. Finally, sending out a fruiting body from the ground and releasing its spores to repeat the cycle.

Cordyceps fungi have been used in Chinese medicine to aid lung, bone, and kidney health and to this day naturopaths use it as a tranquiliser and tonic for anaemia and tumours.

Traditionally Māori have used āwheto as a tattoo pigment in their tā moko practice. This ink is made by burning the infected caterpillars and grinding them into a powder with bird fat to form a paste. Awheto was preferable to normal tree ash as it stains a lot darker, however some iwi prefer to use kauri gum tree ash instead of the fungus.

Awheto was the first fungus documented in New Zealand by European settlers, recorded by Sir William Hooker in 1836. The specimen was given to Hooker by local Māori, with many settlers not believing the fungus was real as they could not find it themselves. This fungus is found in Rotorua, Haast, Southland, Waipu, Waikaremoana, and Taranaki, but has becoming increasingly rare and is now mostly found in untouched native bush.

As part of the Cordyceps genus. these fungi are always host-specific with an insect species. Cordyceps roberstii is the most well-known of 15 Cordyceps species in New Zealand.

=== Werewerekōkako – Entoloma hochstetteri ===
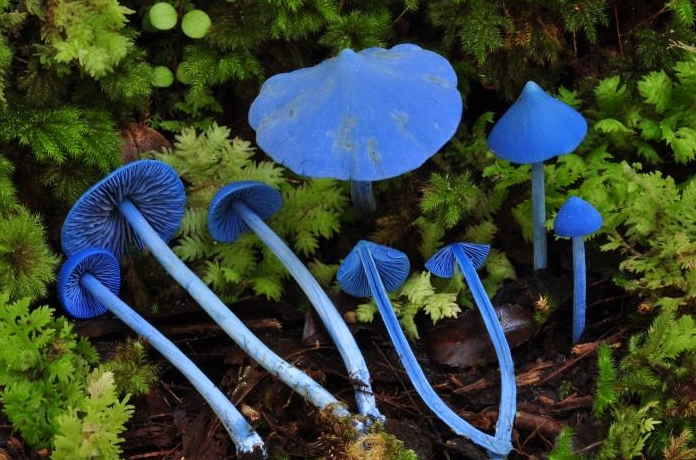
Werewerekōkako, Entoloma hochstetteri: Order / Agaricales; Family / Entolomataceae

The werewerekōkako has bright blue colouring and can be found on the NZ$50 note and in lowland broadleaf forests. This is the only mushroom in the world to be on a bank note.

This mushroom has been named the werewerekōkako from Māori folklore. Oral history states that the mushroom got its colour from the kōkako brushing up against the mushroom and that is how the bird got its blue wattles.

Despite its bright colour, this mushroom is not toxic and not psychedelic. There is research underway to isolate the fungus' blue pigment as there are no stable natural blue food dyes.

=== Inonotus illoydii - te kaikākā ===
This fungus infects the heartwood of totara (Podocarpus totara), creating a honeycomb-like structure that is valuable in Māori wood carving. This fungus rots the wood and weakens its integrity, making it non-suitable for waka or construction.

== Parasitic species ==
Many fungi are saprophytic, meaning they take their nutrients from dead and decaying wood acting as decomposers and helping recycle nutrients back into the ecosystem. However, some fungi are parasitic, taking their nutrients from living organisms. This can cause issues when these types of fungi proliferate in agricultural and horticultural settings.

=== Native parasitic fungi ===
There are native parasites in New Zealand, but these are less harmful than introduced parasitic fungi as they have evolved in tandem with native species, forming an equilibrium. Some of these species are the bootlace mushroom (Armillaria novaezelandiae), Beech Strawberry (Cyttaria sp.), and the aforementioned Putawa and Vegetable Caterpillar fungi.

Harore is one of the few native parasitic fungi that can damage horticultural crops when present in the soil that Pinus radiata and kiwifruit (Actinidia sp.) are planted. Once the soil has contaminated the roots it will spread to adjacent crops.

=== Introduced parasitic fungi ===
Introduced parasitic fungi are often the cause of disease in crops as native species are naive to their mechanism of action. Notable introduced parasitic fungi in New Zealand include Facial eczema (Pithomyces chartarum) in cattle and sheep. As well as Batrachochytrium dendrobatidis which has attributed to decreasing frog populations.

== Pathogenic fungi ==
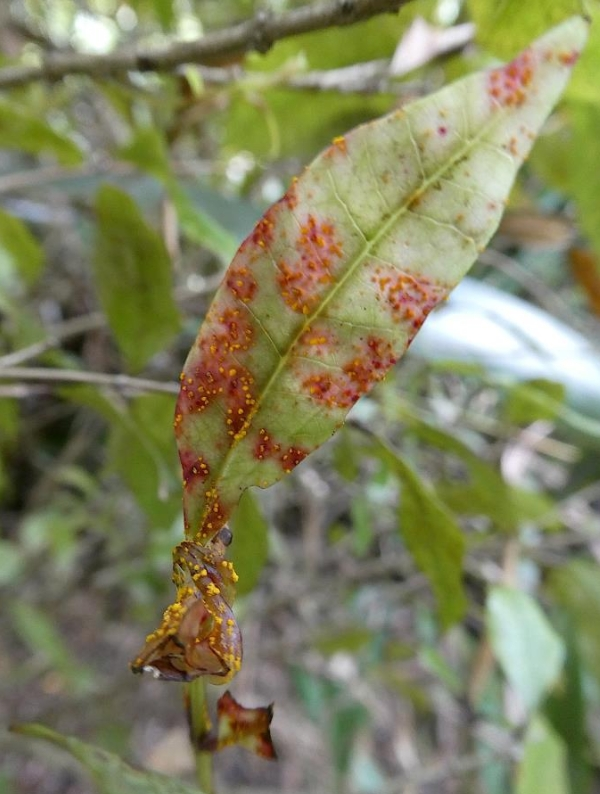
Myrtle rust on pōhutukawa

=== Myrtle rust ===
Myrtle rust (Austropuccinia psidii) is a plant pathogen that threatens New Zealand's ecosystems since its arrival from Australia in 2017. Named after its host specificity to Myrtaceae, Australian populations of Myrtaceae have been heavily infected and lost to myrtle rust. Myrtle rust is known to infect 12 of the 15 Myrtaceae species present in New Zealand.

Its introduction into New Zealand carries a similar threat for taonga and economically significant species such as pōhutukawa (Metrosideros excelsa) and mānuka (Leptospermum scoparium). Despite its progression across the world, relatively little is known about myrtle rust regarding host selection and infection.

=== Kauri dieback ===
Phytophthora agathidicida, known as kauri dieback, is a pathogen found in soil which inhibits the native kauri tree (Agathis australis) from up taking water and nutrients, slowly starving and killing the infected tree. So far kauri dieback has only been found infecting trees in Northland, Great Barrier Island and the Coromandel. The spread and subsequent effects of kauri dieback are being managed by the Kauri protection programme, working with New Zealand Biosecurity and the Ministry of Primary Industries (MPI).
