= New Zealand Threat Classification System =

System to assess the conservation priorities of New Zealand species

The New Zealand Threat Classification System is used by the Department of Conservation to assess conservation priorities of species in New Zealand.

The system was developed because the IUCN Red List, a similar conservation status system, had some shortcomings for the unique requirements of conservation ranking in New Zealand. As of 2011, plants, animals, and fungi are evaluated, though the lattermost has yet to be published. Algae were assessed in 2005 but not reassessed since. Other protists have not been evaluated.

== Categories ==
The structure of the New Zealand Threat Classification System (2007 revision)

Species that are ranked are assigned categories:

Threatened
This category has three major divisions:
- Nationally Critical - equivalent to the IUCN category of Critically endangered
- Nationally Endangered - equivalent to the IUCN category of Endangered
- Nationally Vulnerable - equivalent to the IUCN category of Vulnerable
At Risk
This has four categories:
- Declining
- Recovering
- Relict
- Naturally Uncommon

=== Other categories ===
Introduced and Naturalised
These are any species that are deliberately or accidentally introduced into New Zealand.
Migrant
Migrant species are those that visit New Zealand as part of their life cycle.
Vagrant
Vagrants are taxa that are rare in New Zealand that have made their own way and do not breed successfully.
Coloniser
These taxa have arrived in New Zealand without human help and reproduce successfully.
Data Deficient
This category lists taxa for which insufficient information is available to make as assessment on conservation status.
Extinct
Taxa for which there is no reasonable doubt that no individuals exist are ranked as extinct. For these lists only species that have become extinct since 1840 are listed.
Not Threatened
If taxa fit into none of the other categories they are listed in the Not Threatened category.

== Qualifiers ==
A series of qualifiers are used to give additional information on the threat classification:

Qualifier		Definition
CD	Conservation Dependent	Likely to move to a higher threat category if current management ceases
DP	Data Poor	Confidence in the listing is low due to the poor data available for assessment
De	Designated	The criteria do not completely apply to the taxa
EW	Extinct in the Wild	Exists only in cultivation or in captivity
EF	Extreme Fluctuations	Extreme unnatural population fluctuations, or natural fluctuations overlaying human-induced declines, that increase the threat of extinction
Inc	Increasing	Population thought to increase 10% over 3 generations or 10 years
IE	Island Endemic	Endemic only to a single archipelago and not the main islands
OL	One Location	Found at one location (geographically or ecologically distinct area) in which a single event (such as a predator irruption) could soon affect all individuals of the taxon
PD	Partial Decline	Taxa has one or more secure populations but otherwise is declining
RR	Range Restricted	Taxa confined to less than 1,000 km^{2} (390 sq mi)
RF	Recruitment Failure	Current population may appear stable but the age structure is such that catastrophic declines are likely in the future
SO	Secure Overseas	Secure in other parts of its natural range outside New Zealand
Sp	Sparse	Taxa in small, scattered populations
ST	Stable	Total population stable
TO	Threatened Overseas	Threatened in those parts of its natural range outside New Zealand

== New Zealand Threat Classification Series ==
New Zealand Threat Classification System
- Discipline: Nature conservation
- Language: English

Publication details
- History: 2008–present
- Publisher: New Zealand Department of Conservation
- Open access: Yes
- License: CC-BY

Standard abbreviations
- ISO 4: N. Z. Threat Classif. Syst.

Indexing
- ISSN: 2324-1713

Links
- Series homepage

New Zealand Threat Classification Series is a scientific monograph series providing the NZTCS status of members of a group of species, written by an independent panel of experts. There are currently 23 groups, each assessed once approximately every 5 years.

== See also ==
- Conservation in New Zealand
