= Facial eczema =

Mycotoxic disease of ungulates

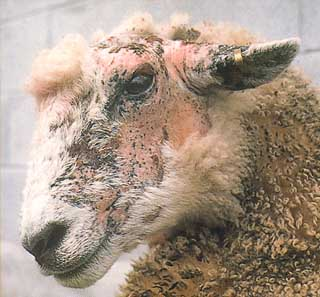
A sheep showing clinical symptoms of facial eczema

Facial eczema is a mycotoxic disease that affects the liver of several animals, mainly sheep and cattle, but can also infect other ungulates. It is caused by ingesting sporidesmins released by the fungus Pithomyces chartarum. Its visible symptoms are characterized by red skin that turns black and crusty before peeling off, as well as inflammation that can cause swelling of the udder, teats, ears and face. The disease is not always visible. Other symptoms include weight loss, weakness and death.

== P. chartarum ==
It grows mostly in New Zealand but also occurs in Australia, France, South Africa, and South America. The fungus grows on dead plants, especially on perennial ryegrass near the ground (25mm height). It most commonly grows between January and May, as it requires warm, humid conditions, as well as moisture at ground level. Areas of spore growth can include urine patches and areas sheltered by hedges. The fungus grows in clusters and is normally invisible to human eye. It produces millions of spores with the toxic substance sporidesmin. Fresh spores are particularly toxic. Contaminated pasture loses its toxicity after 2 weeks.

== Pathophysiology ==
The incubation period is 7-20 days after poison intake. Sporidesmin is hepatotoxic and leads to hepatogenous photosensitization and phylloerythrin accumulation in the bloodstream. It damages the bile ducts and then the liver. The worst case is liver necrosis. This causes – as a secondary effect – photosensitization, this means the inflammation of unpigmented areas and exposed skin (ears, teat, face) and photodynamic dermatitis. Only 5% of affected animals show the respective clinical signs.

== Symptoms ==
=== Sheep ===
Infected sheep experience sunburn at face, ears, teats and vulva. It is the primary symptom of the poisoning caused by sporidesmin. The sunburn is caused by the fact that the lower tissue is swollen. The skin gets crusty, dark and then peels,. making it susceptible to infection.

Other symptoms include dullness, weakness, inappetence, and ill-thrift. An affection of the liver results in jaundice. In a worst-case, the sheep die.

=== Cattle ===
Infected cattle suffer from sunburn. Dark pigmented skin is often affected. Cattle produce less milk. Jaundice is possible and death after some months.

== Treatment ==
Convalescence can take a long time, but some animals may not get healthy. External therapy is possible to treat the sunburn. Animals could be protected by the intake of zinc. Zinc reacts with sporidesmin to create a metallic complex, so that the poison can be eliminated from the body.

== Prevention and control ==
If animals are sunburned, they should be placed in the stable to protect them from sunlight. Infected cattle should no longer be used in milk production.

Reduce flock density (0.45 hectare/ 15 cows or 100 sheep)

GGT (enzyme) is released by the damaged liver over the course of this disease and can be tested to indicate disease severity.
