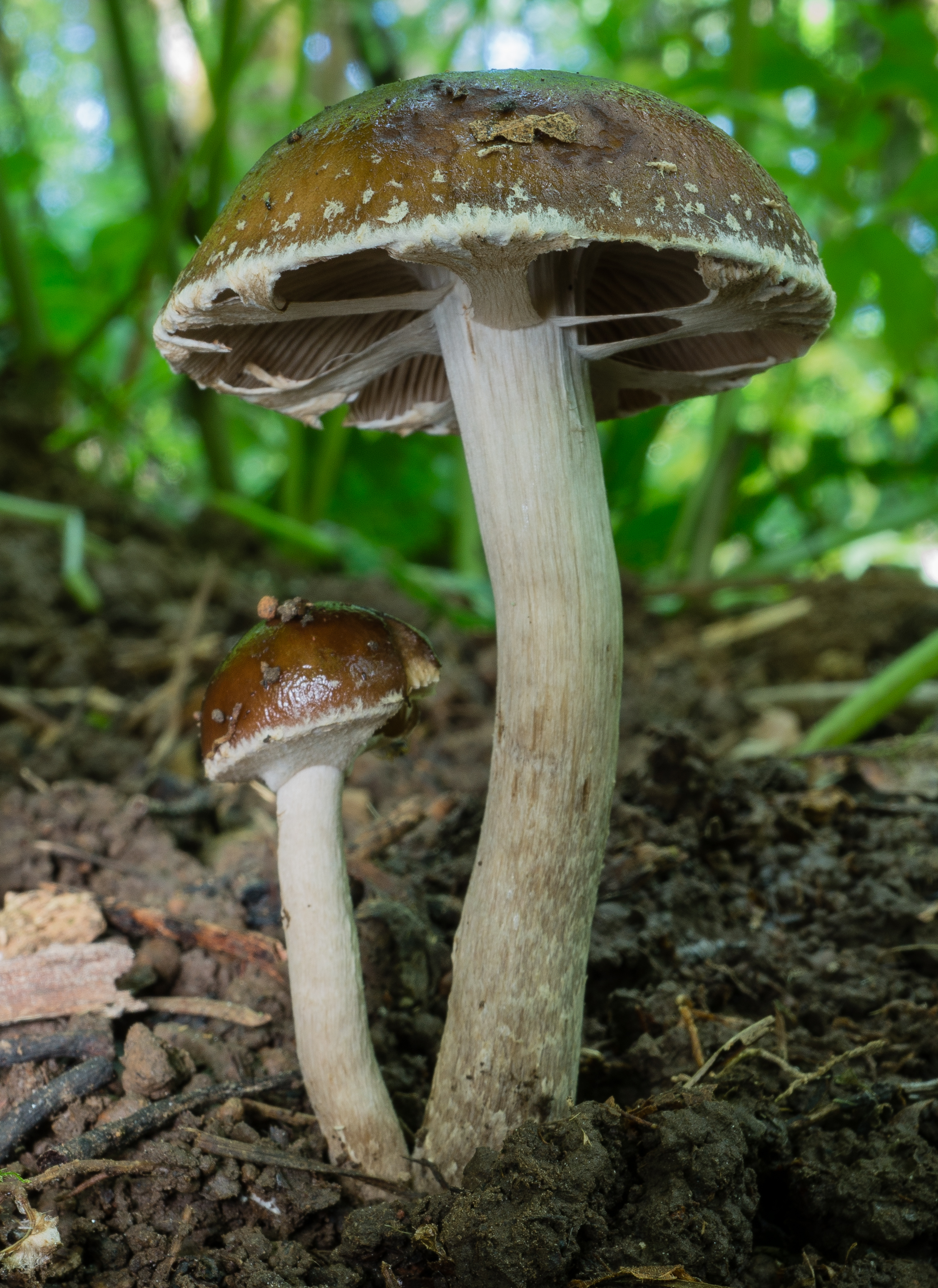
- Cyclocybe erebia

Scientific classification
- Kingdom: Fungi
- Division: Basidiomycota
- Class: Agaricomycetes
- Order: Agaricales
- Family: Tubariaceae
- Genus: Cyclocybe; Velen.

= Cyclocybe =

Genus of fungi

Cyclocybe is a genus of fungi belonging to the family Tubariaceae. The genus has a cosmopolitan distribution.

== Species ==
The following species are recognised in the genus Cyclocybe:

- Cyclocybe aegerita (V.Brig.) Vizzini
- Cyclocybe cylindracea (DC.) Vizzini & Angelini
- Cyclocybe erebia (Fr.) Vizzini & Matheny
- Cyclocybe erebioides Angelini & Vizzini
- Cyclocybe lateritia Velen.
- Cyclocybe mnichovicensis Velen.
- Cyclocybe parasitica (G.Stev.) Vizzini
- Cyclocybe pragensis Velen.
- Cyclocybe salicaceicola (Zhu L.Yang, M.Zang & X.X.Liu) Vizzini
- Cyclocybe squamulosa Velen.
