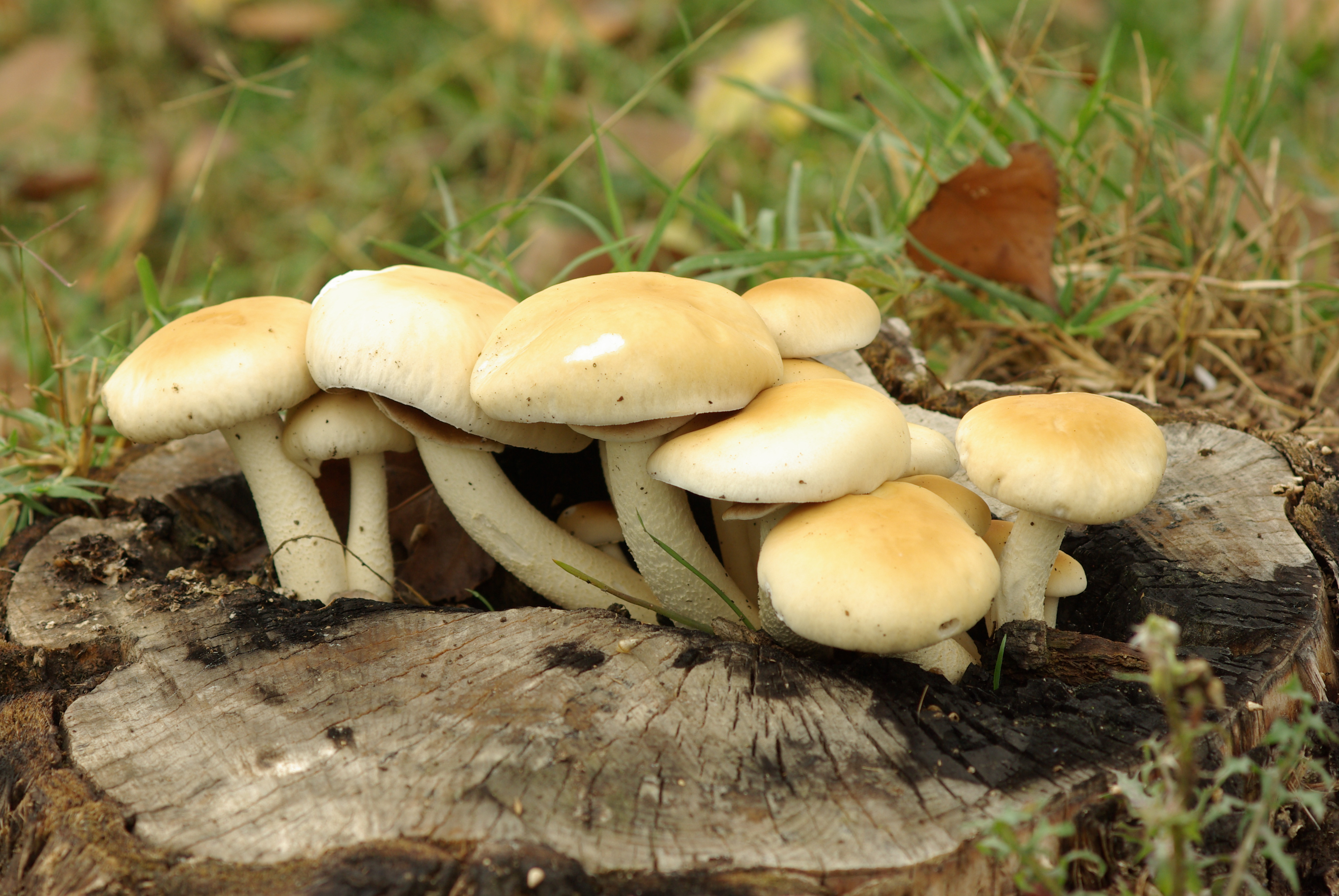
- Growing on a poplar stump in Girona, Spain

Scientific classification
- Kingdom: Fungi
- Division: Basidiomycota
- Class: Agaricomycetes
- Order: Agaricales
- Family: Tubariaceae
- Genus: Cyclocybe
- Species: C. aegerita

Binomial name
- Cyclocybe aegerita (V. Brig.) Vizzini 2014

= Cyclocybe aegerita =

Species of fungus

Cyclocybe aegerita
- Mycological characteristics
- Gills on hymenium
- Cap is convex or flat
- Hymenium is adnate
- Stipe has a ring
- Spore print is brown
- Ecology is saprotrophic
- Edibility is choice but not recommended

Cyclocybe aegerita, also called Agrocybe cylindracea, Agrocybe aegerita or Pholiota aegerita, is a species of fungus in the genus Cyclocybe. It is commonly known as the poplar fieldcap, poplar mushroom, or velvet pioppini (simplified Chinese: 茶树菇; traditional Chinese: 茶樹菇; pinyin: chá shù gū; lit. 'Tea Tree Mushroom'). In Japan, it is called Yanagi-matsutake (柳松茸).

It is a white rot fungus with a cap up to 10 centimetres (4 inches) wide. Although it resembles some poisonous species, it is edible and cultivated in some countries.

== Description ==
The mushroom is a medium-sized agaric having a very open and convex cap, almost flat, with a diameter of 3–10 centimetres (1–4 inches). Underneath, it has numerous whitish radial plates adherent to the foot, later turning to a brownish-grey colour, and light elliptic spores of 8–11 by 5–7 μm. The white fibre foot is generally curved, having a membranous ring on the top part which promptly turns to tobacco colour due to the falling spores. When very young, its colour may be reddish-brown and later turn to a light brown colour, more ochre towards the centre, whiter around its border.

It is difficult to identify and some species in the genus are poisonous.

== Habitat ==
It is a white rot fungus growing in tufts on logs and holes in poplars, as well as other large-leaved trees.

== Uses ==
The mushroom is edible but resembles some deadly species. It is a typical ingredient found in both Southern European and Chinese cuisine. In East Asia, it is used fresh and rehydrated in various dishes, including stir fry, soup, stew, and hot pot.

It is cultivated in Korea, Japan, China, and Australia. In traditional Chinese medicine, it is often used as a diuretic.

Along with Mycetinis alliaceus and Chondrostereum purpureum, it is suitable for counteracting olive-mill wastewater plant toxicity.

== Gallery ==
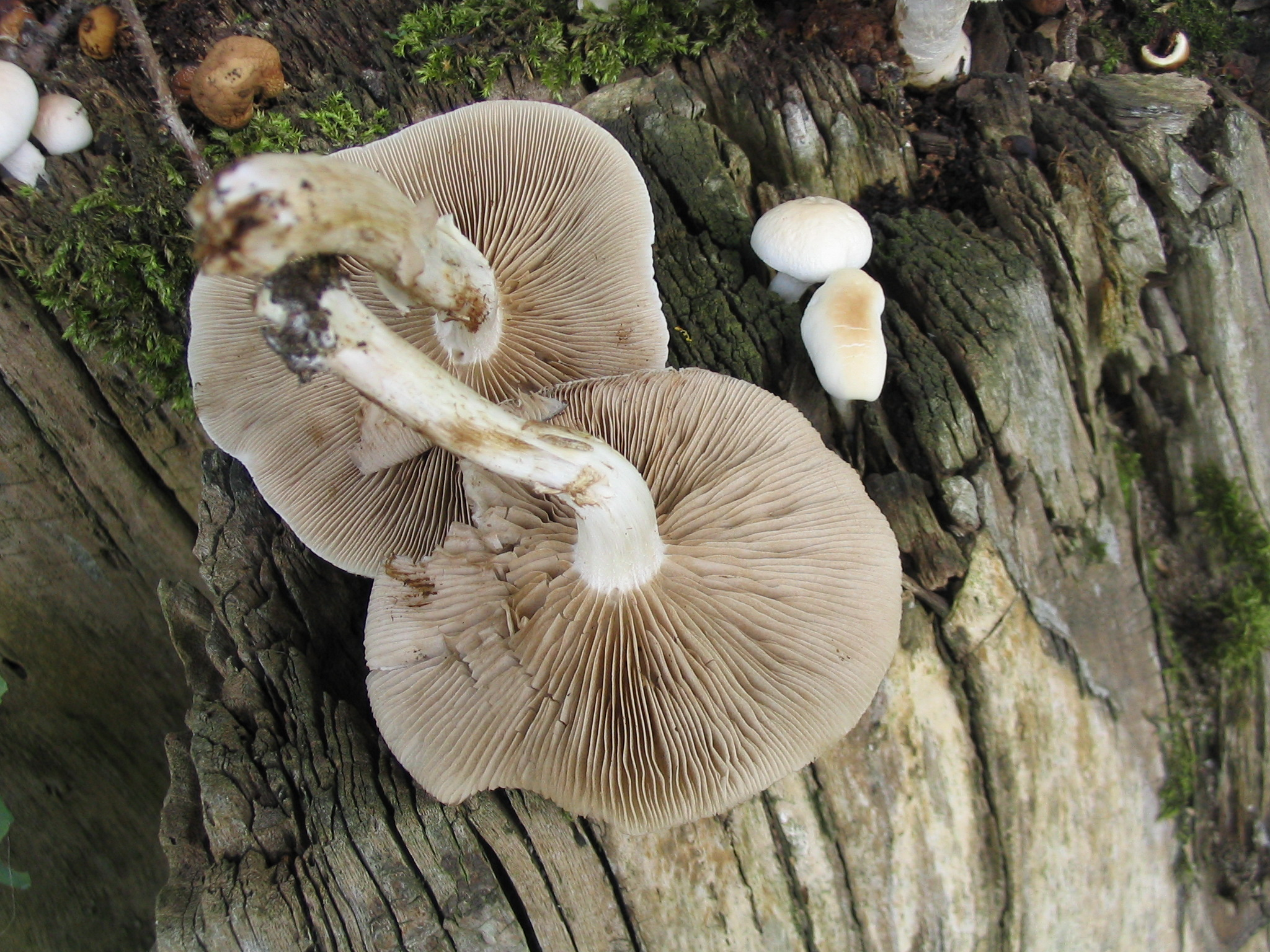

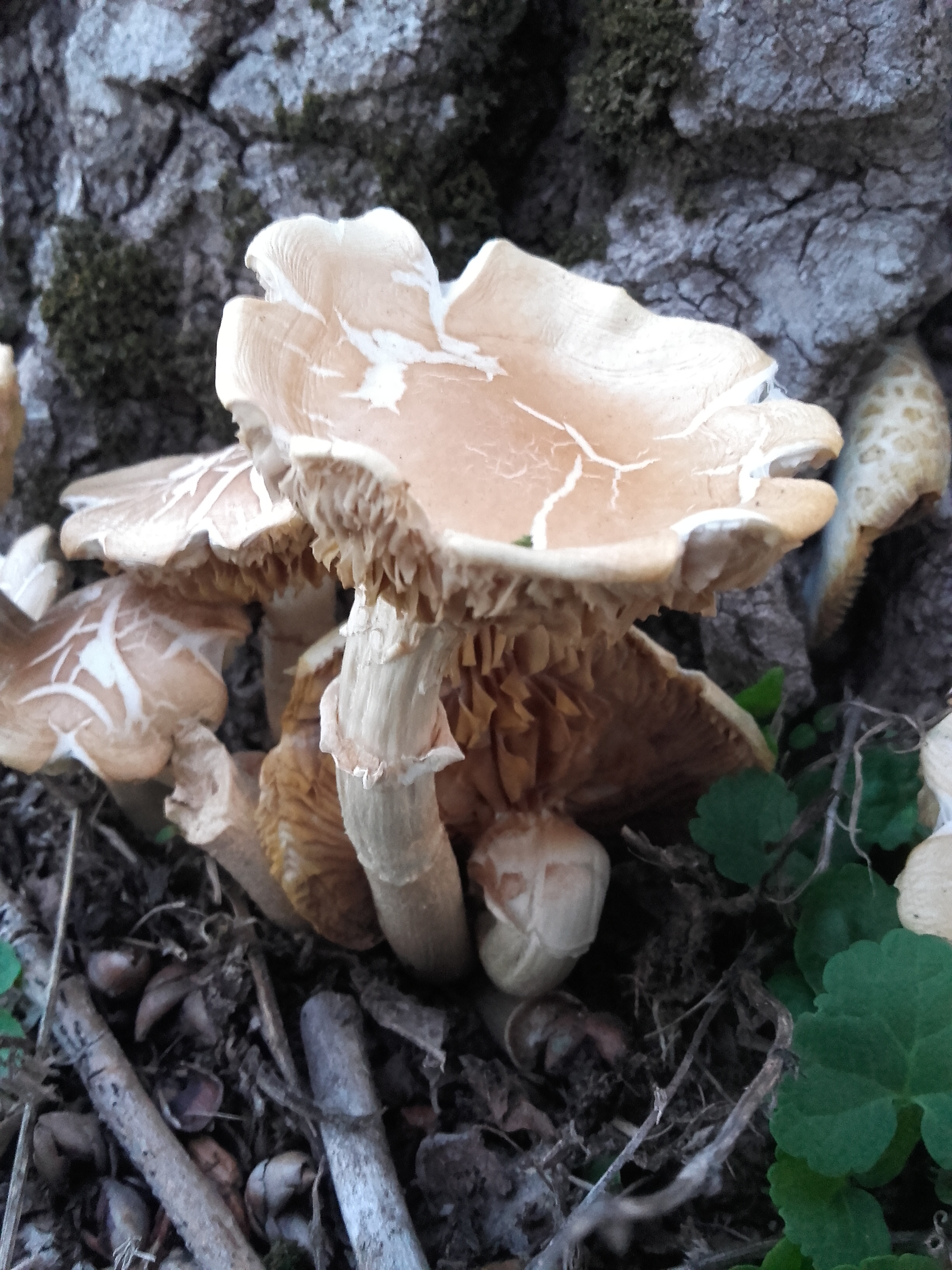

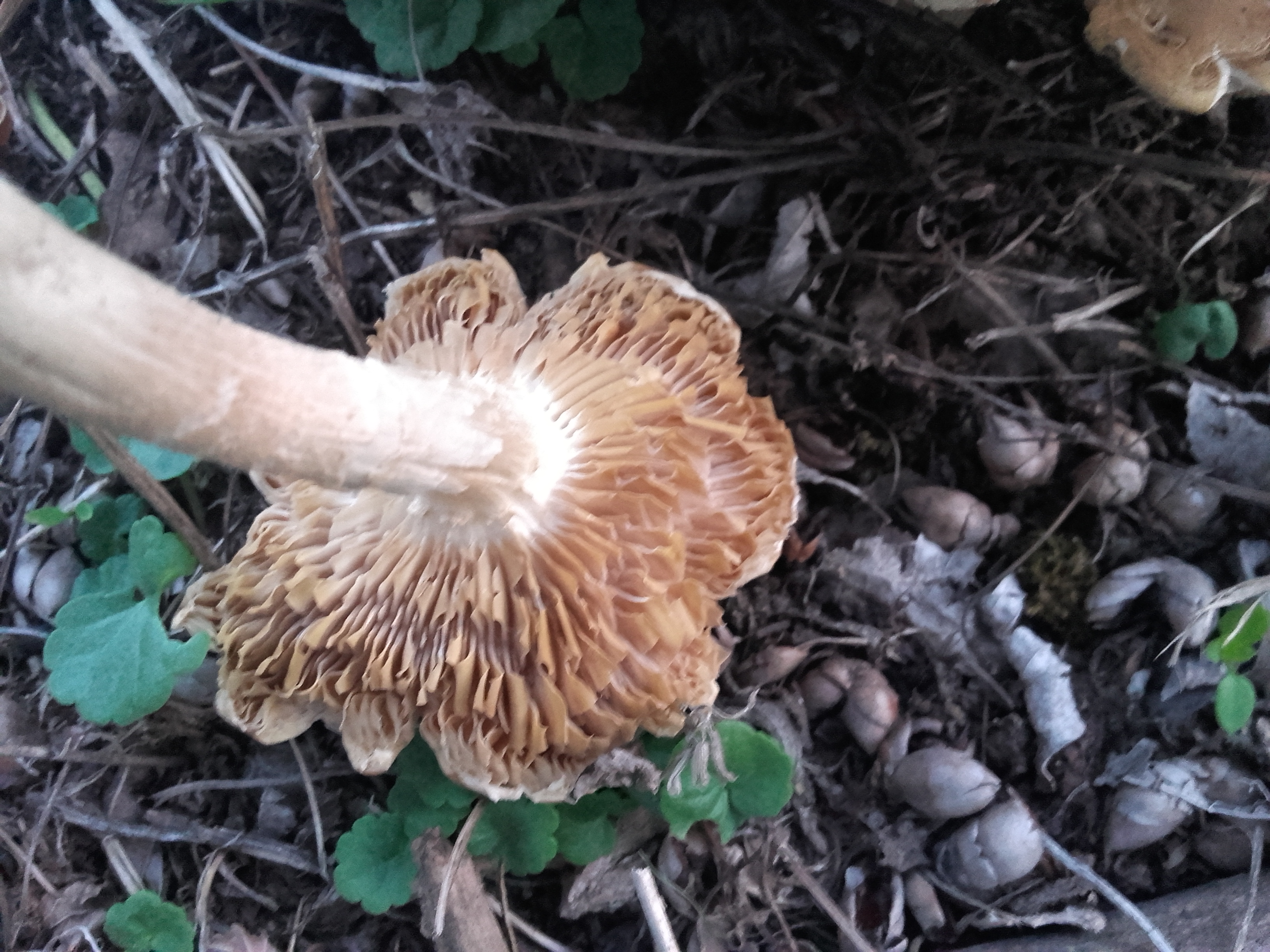

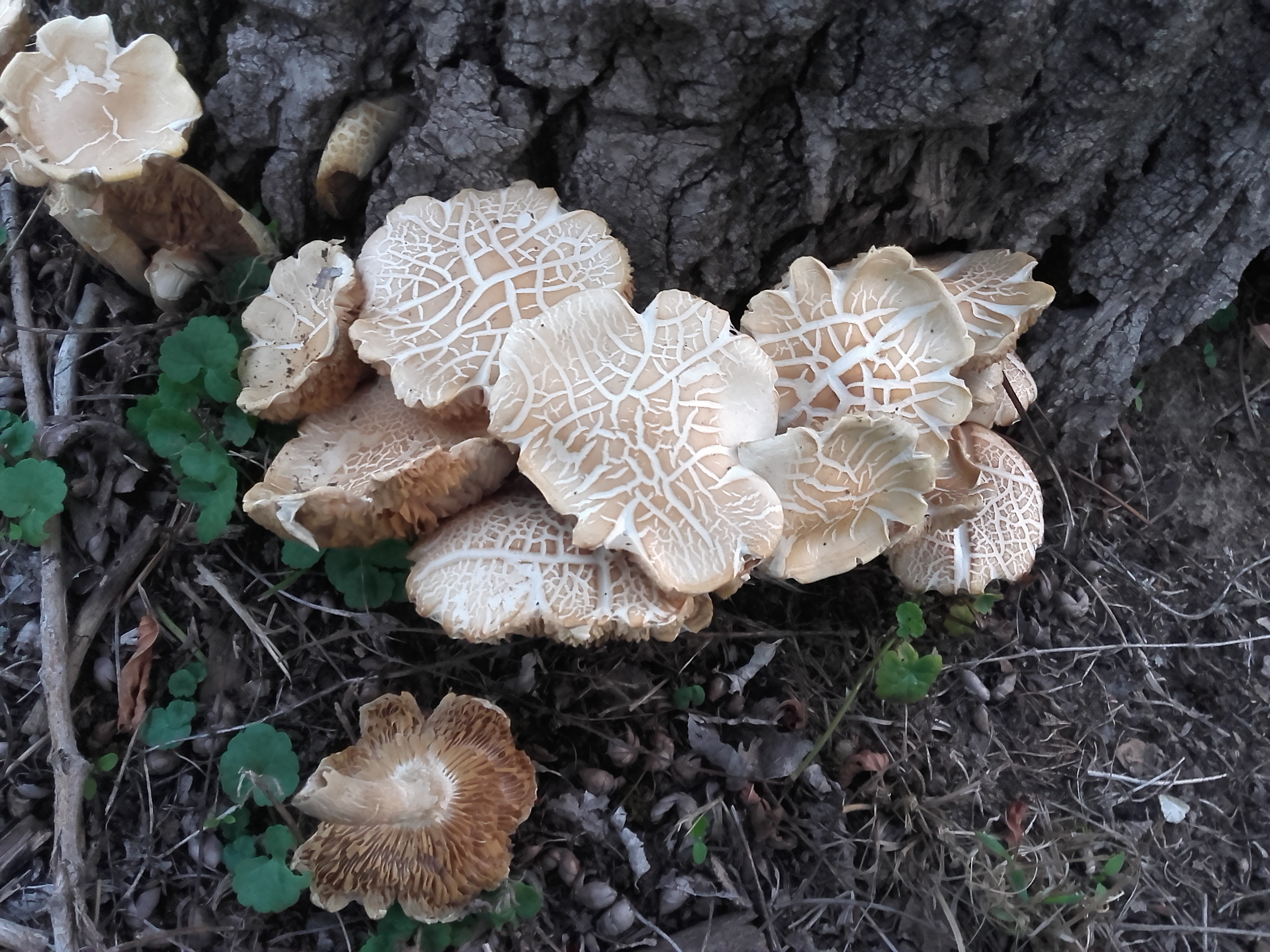

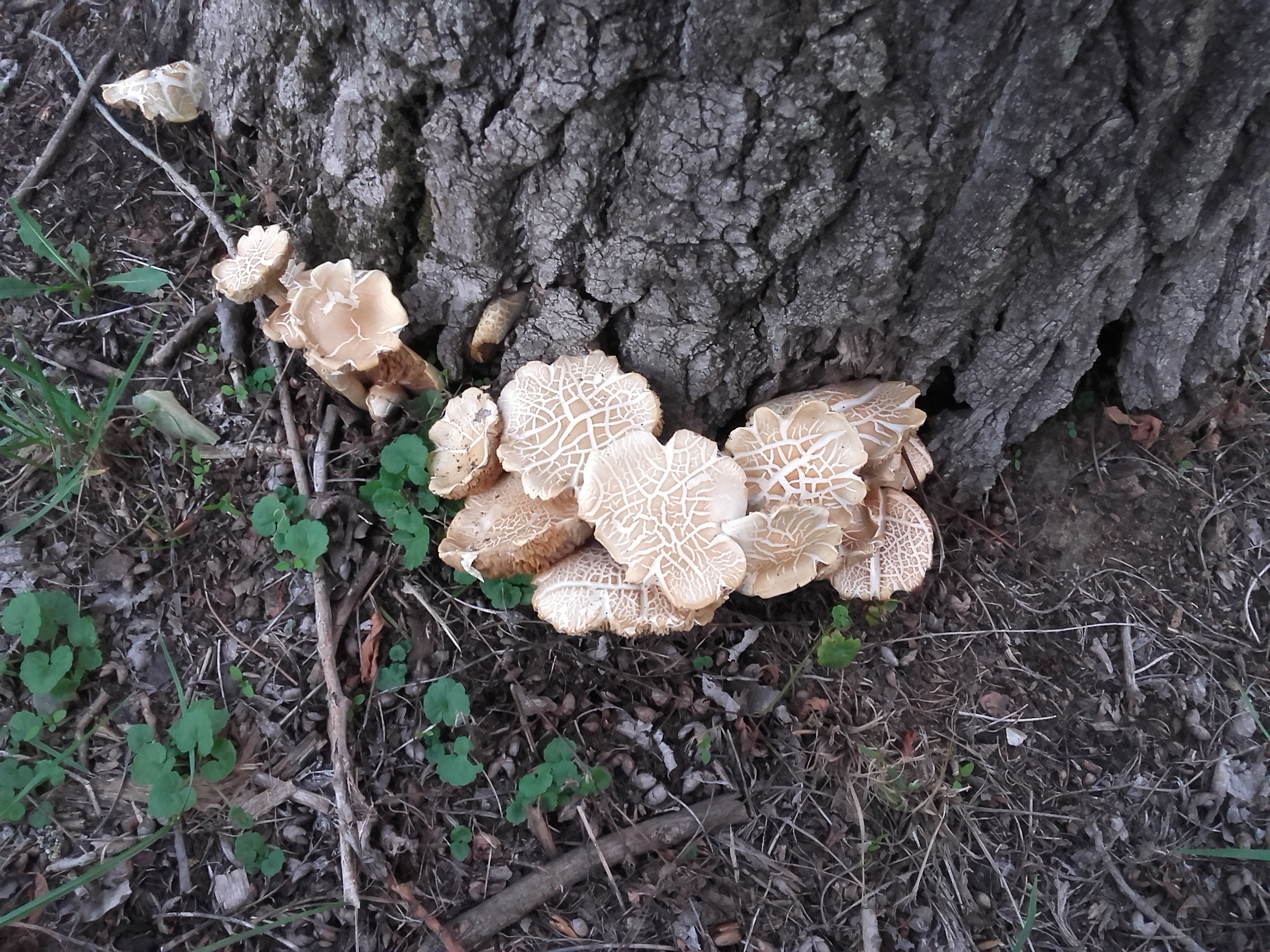
