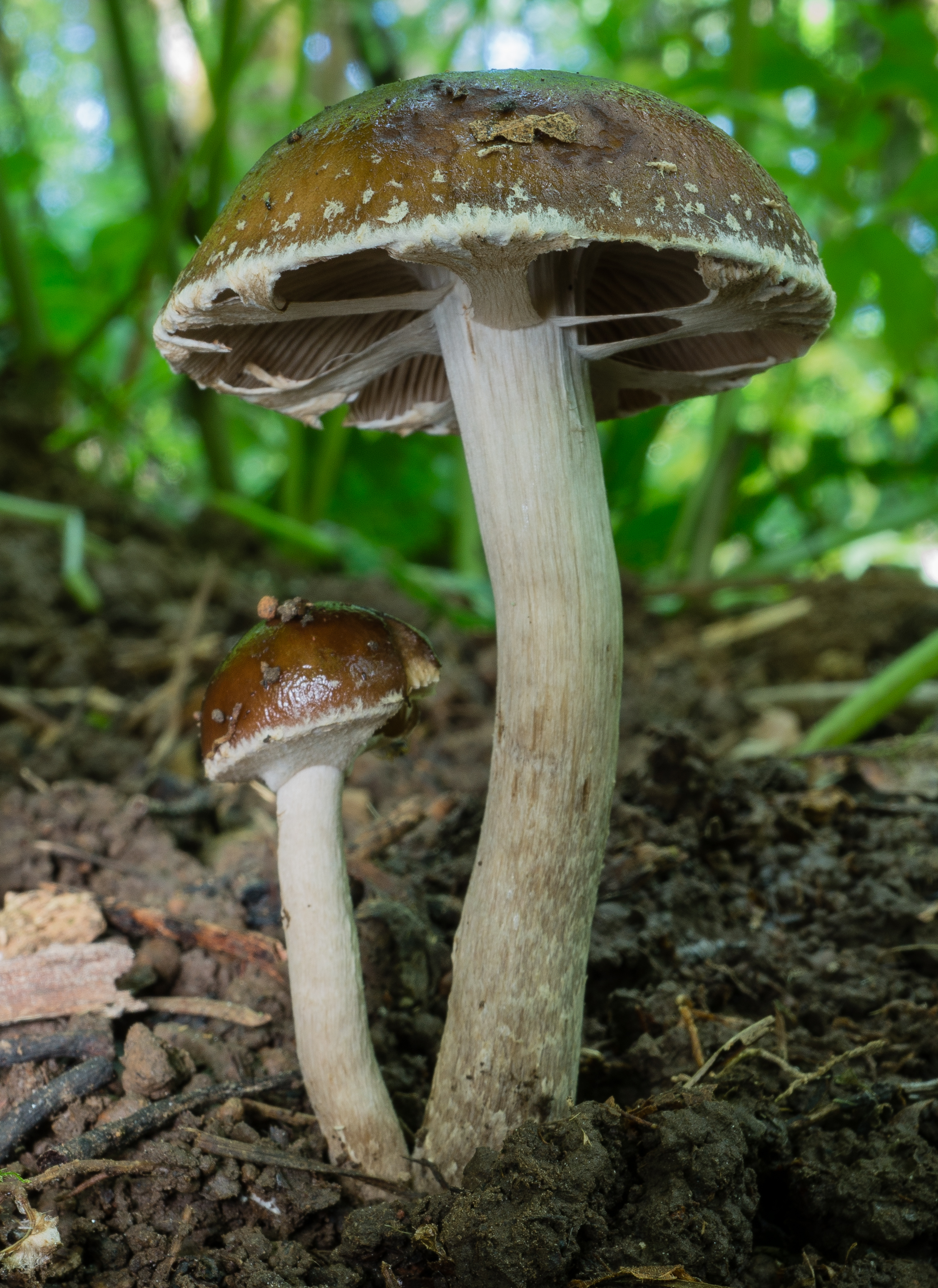

Scientific classification
- Kingdom: Fungi
- Division: Basidiomycota
- Class: Agaricomycetes
- Order: Agaricales
- Family: Tubariaceae
- Genus: Cyclocybe
- Species: C. erebia

Binomial name
- Cyclocybe erebia (Fr.) Vizzini & Matheny

Synonyms
- Agrocybe erebia (Fr.) Singer

= Cyclocybe erebia =

Species of mushroom

Cyclocybe erebia Mycological characteristics
- Gills on hymenium
- Cap is convex
- Hymenium is decurrent or subdecurrent
- Stipe has a ring
- Spore print is brown
- Ecology is saprotrophic
- Edibility is unknown

Cyclocybe erebia, also known as the dark fieldcap, or sometimes Agrocybe erebia, is a species of brown-spored agaric with a wide distribution.

== Taxonomy ==
Cyclocybe erebia was once considered to be in the genus Agrocybe, but recent DNA sequencing has shown that it is not, instead placing it in Cyclocybe.

== Description ==
The color of the cap can range from light to dark brown. When wet, it is viscid (i.e. slimy). The cap can range from 1.5 to 5 centimetres (5/8 to 2 in) in diameter; younger caps are very round. The edge of the cap is often frilled or wrinkly, and more lightly colored. Decurrent gills are present underneath the cap. They are whitish at first, but they become brown with maturity. The stipe is whitish, browning with age, 2.5–8 cm (1–3 1/8 in) long, and 3–10 millimetres (1/8–3/8 in) thick. When young, a partial veil is present, covering the hymenium. It later separates from the margin, sometimes leaving behind a white ring.

The whitish to brown flesh does not stain. The spore print is brown.

=== Microscopic features ===
The spores measure 10 μm–15 μm × 5 μm–7 μm, and are ellipsoid or subellipsoid, often with a snout-like end, and are brown or yellow-brown.

The basidia are 2-sterigmate.

=== Similar species ===
Lookalikes include Agrocybe praecox, which is usually larger.

== Habitat and distribution ==
The species occurs in the Americas, Europe, and parts of Oceania. It can be found with moisture on the ground from August to October in most of North America, and September to December on the West Coast.
