= Pseudopithomyces chartarum =

Scientific classification
- Kingdom: Fungi
- Division: Ascomycota
- Class: Dothideomycetes
- Order: Pleosporales
- Family: Didymosphaeriaceae
- Genus: Pseudopithomyces
- Species: P. chartarum

Binomial name
- Pseudopithomyces chartarum (Berk. & M.A. Curtis) Jun F. Li, Ariyaw. & K.D. Hyde (2015)

Synonyms
- Sporidesmium chartarum Berk. & M.A. Curtis (1874); Piricauda chartaram (Berk. & M.A. Curtis) R.T. Moore (1959); Pithomyces chartarum (Berk. & M.A. Curtis) M.B. Ellis (1960); Sporidesmium bakeri Syd. & P. Syd. (1914); Leptosphaerulina chartarum Cec. Roux

Species of fungus

Pseudopithomyces chartarum is a fungus predominantly found in subtropical countries and other localities with warmer climates. However, it occurs throughout the world including the United Kingdom, Europe and Netherlands. Pseudopithomyces chartarum produces a mycotoxin called sporidesmin when it grows on plants, particularly grasses. Presence of the toxin in forage grasses causes facial eczema in sheep, and is especially problematic in areas such as New Zealand where sheep are intensively raised. Other health effect of P. chartarum are not well understood.

== History and taxonomy ==
This species was first discovered by Miles Berkeley and Moses Ashley Curtis as Sporidesmium chartarum in 1874. It was independently named Sporidesmium bakeri by German mycologists Hans and Paul Sydow in 1914. Canadian mycologist Stanley Hughes examined specimens of both taxa in 1958 and concluded that they represented the same taxon which he contemplated assigning them to the genus Scheleobrachea. Several years later, the British mycologist Martin Ellis described the fungus in the genus Pithomyces as P. chartarum. It has been suggested that P. chartarum may be indigenous to New Zealand.

== Growth and morphology ==
Pseudopithomyces chartarum produces spores that are multicellular and darkly pigmented, although they are produced sparsely. The spores can be barrel-shaped, ellipsoidal or club-shaped. Pseudopithomyces chartarum has three vegetative hyphal types: sparsely septate, densely septate, and densely septate with surface spines. The colonies are fast growing and their morphology depends on temperature. When the temperature is below 20 °C (68 °F), the sparsely septate morphology predominates in contrast to the densely septate for that is stimulated by temperatures of 26 °C (79 °F). The spores that are germinating produce hyaline superficial hyphae which can easily penetrate plant cell walls. The conidiophores bear simple conidia, they are short, thin walled and usually nonseptate. The conidia are considered aleurioconidia because they arise singly at the apex of each conidiophore. Conidia may also form in clusters on a network of conidiogenous branches. Mature conidia typically have three transverse septa and up to two longitudinal septa.

== Physiology ==
The production of conidia and vegetative hyphae are good at 24 °C (75 °F). Conidia require free water to germinate and do not germinate at water potentials below −140 bars. The production of conidia is stimulated in vitro by exposure to near UV-light. Warm ground temperatures and high humidity cause rapid growth but lower temperatures result in higher sporidesmin content of conidia. Pseudopithomyces chartarum produces sporidesmin but also has been seen to produce cyclodepsipeptides and sporidemolides.

== Habitat and ecology ==
Pseudopithomyces chartarum is more likely to be found in tropical locations but its range might be expanding. It can be found in pastures growing on debris and on damaged potato leaves, on dead leaves and stem of plants and occasionally in indoor environments on paper, ceiling tiles and may be present in carpet and mattress dust. It is thought to be especially frequent on fodder grasses. Pseudopithomyces chartarum foliar infections can be clearly observed because they result in the formation of necrotic spots; however, recent studies have suggested that plant infections may be asymptomatic under certain circumstances. Growth of the fungus is inhibited in vitro by Bacillus subtilis and cochliodinol.

== Disease ==
Pseudopithomyces chartarum is known to cause facial eczema in sheep and cattle, prevalent in New Zealand and occasionally in Australia. It is more common in sheep and deer, and goats seem to be less affected. Due to the growth required for the spores, we normally see cases occur after warm rains in fall or in summer. Symptoms of animal illness are usually apparent 10–14 days after ingestion. Animal disease caused by this fungus can be controlled in farm animals by avoiding short grazing, feeding cattle zinc or by using benzimidazole fungicides on pastures. The effects on human health are not well understood but it is thought that P. chartarum could also be involved in glue blotch disease of rice.
