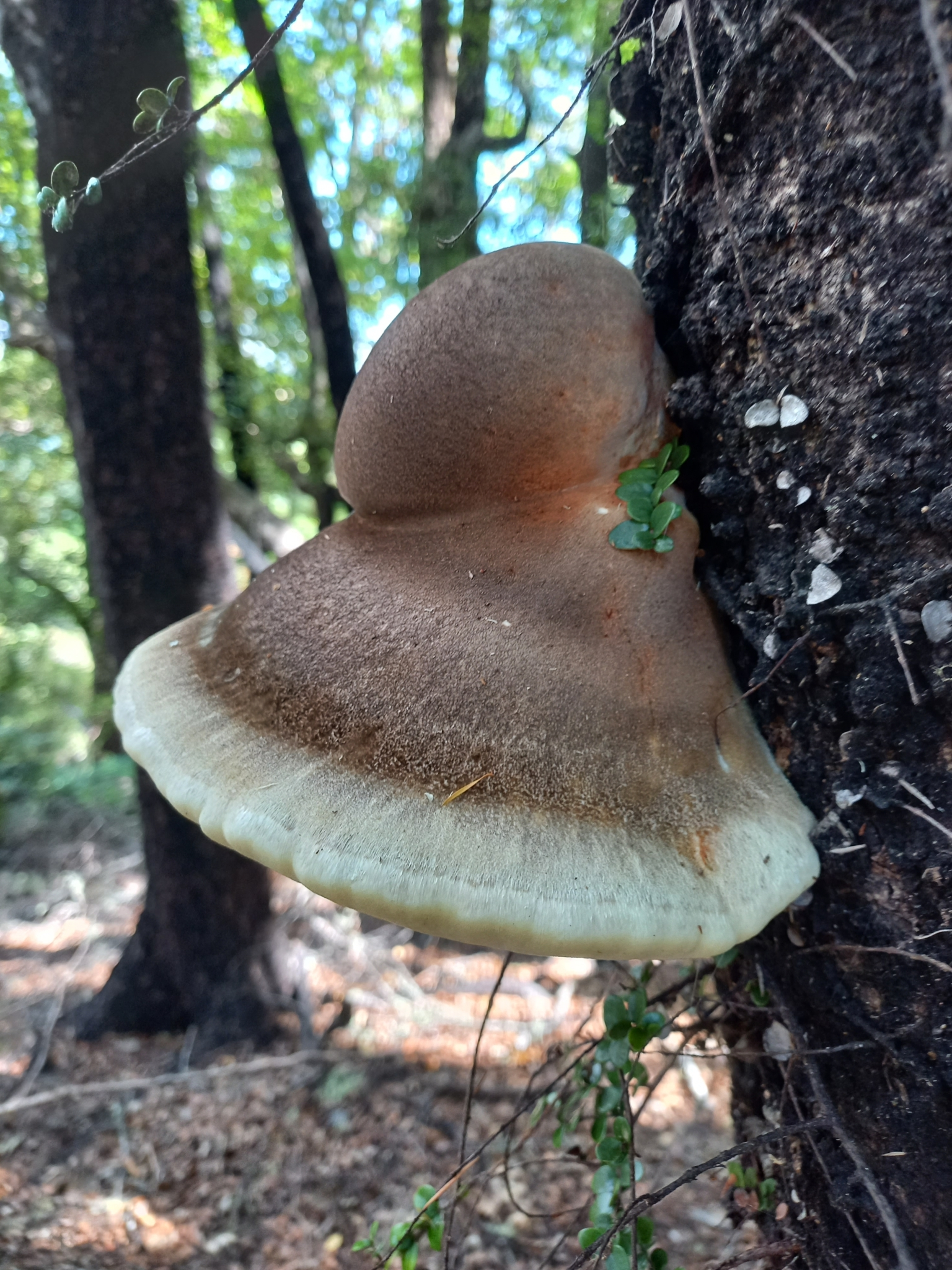
- Fruiting body of L. portentosus growing on a tree, South Island, New Zealand

Scientific classification
- Kingdom: Fungi
- Division: Basidiomycota
- Class: Agaricomycetes
- Order: Polyporales
- Family: Laetiporaceae
- Genus: Laetiporus
- Species: L. portentosus

Binomial name
- Laetiporus portentosus (Berk.) Rajchenb. (1995)

= Laetiporus portentosus =

Species of fungus

Laetiporus portentosus is a species of polypore fungus in the family Fomitopsidaceae, found in South America, Australia, and in the North Island and northern South Island of New Zealand.

== Name ==
L. portentosus is known in Māori as pūtawa or pangu, and European settlers (Pākeha) called it "beech whiskers", "beech beard", or "morepork bread". It was also referred to as "punk", a general term for any Polyporus fungus dried and used as tinder.

== Description ==
The fungus is a yellowish or white flattened bulbous mass, with a consistency like expanded polystyrene when it is dry, but soft like a sponge when it is thoroughly wet, with a light brown top and paler underside with very small but visible pores, 1–3 pores/mm. Often enough, the mass is thoroughly eaten by grubs, till it looks like a sponge. Usually found several metres above ground, it grows 10–30 cm across and up to 6 cm thick.

== Ecology ==
In New Zealand this species in Māori tradition was associated with the small tree hutu (Ascarina lucida), so much so that it was known as ngā huruhuru o hutu waewae – "the hairs on the legs of hutu". In New Zealand it is also found on southern beech (Nothofagus) trees. The white-throated treecreeper (Cormobates leucophaea) has been recorded feeding on this fungus in a heathy dry forest in Victoria.

In a study comparing different fungi that inhabit wood, it was found that L. portentosus had a high ability to decompose heartwood and a low ability to decompose sapwood of Nothofagus pumilio.

== Taxonomy ==
The fungus was first described in 1844 by English mycologist Miles Joseph Berkeley. Mario Rajchenberg transferred it to the genus Laetiporus in 1995, based on morphology, but in a 2008 molecular phylogeny L. portentosus fell well outside the core Laetiporus clade, suggesting Laetiporus is polyphyletic and more gene regions needed to be sequenced to resolve this. The fungus has acquired an extensive synonymy in the interim:

- Polyporus portentosus Berk. (1844)
- Ungulina portentosa (Berk.) Pat. (1906)
- Piptoporus portentosus (Berk.) G. Cunn. (1965)
- Polyporus eucalyptorum Fr. (1846)
- Ungulina eucalyptorum (Fr.) Pat. (1906)
- Piptoporus eucalyptorum (Fr.) Warcup (1986)
- Polyporus leucocreas Cooke (1879)
- Polyporus spermolepidis Pat. (1898)
- Ungulina spermolepidis (Pat.) Pat. (1906)
- Ungulina spermolepidis var. pandani Pat. (1906)
- Polyporus spermolepidis var. pandani (Pat.) Sacc. & Trotter (1912)
- Polyporus albofuscus Lloyd (1924)
- Durogaster albus Lloyd (1924)

== Cultural uses ==
L. portentosus has been used traditionally as tinder and for carrying fire by both Australian Aboriginals and New Zealand Māori people; when dried and set alight, the fungus will smoulder very slowly, and could be used as a reliable source of ignition. Smouldering pieces were half-buried in the ground (where they would burn for a day or two), carried from place to place in ornately carved tinderboxes, or placed atop a stick and used to light one's way when travelling at night. Pākehā also used pūtawa as a fire starter, a substitute for touchpaper, carrying it around in cigarette tins; it was even sent with flint stones to New Zealand troops in both World Wars to help light cigarettes and pipes.

Māori used pūtawa cut into absorbent strips and bandaged around wounds to protect them from pressure. It was also possibly taken internally "to soften and ease a difficult labour."

== Gallery ==
Fruiting bodies of L. portentosus in New Zealand

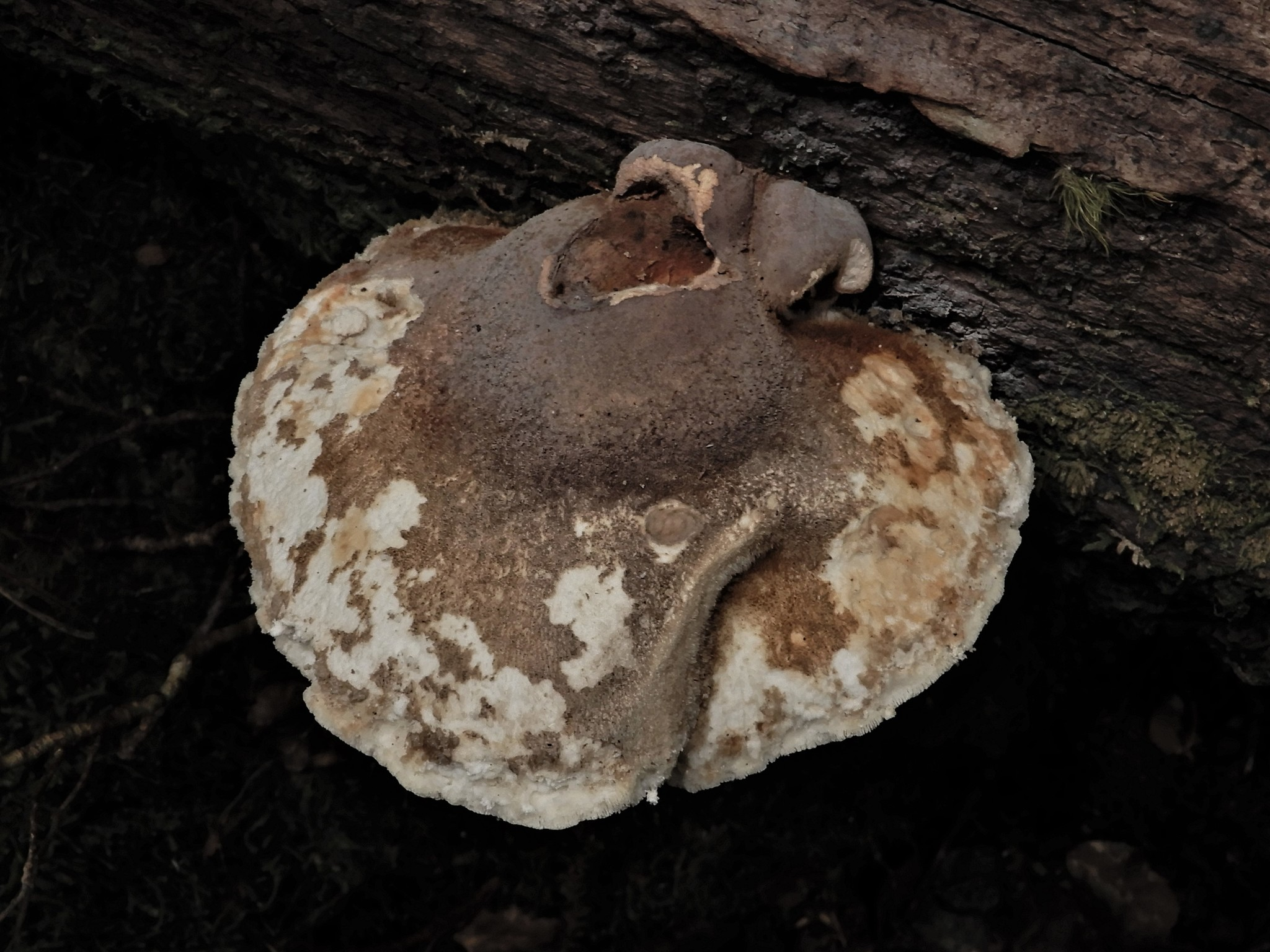
Upper surface of fruiting body

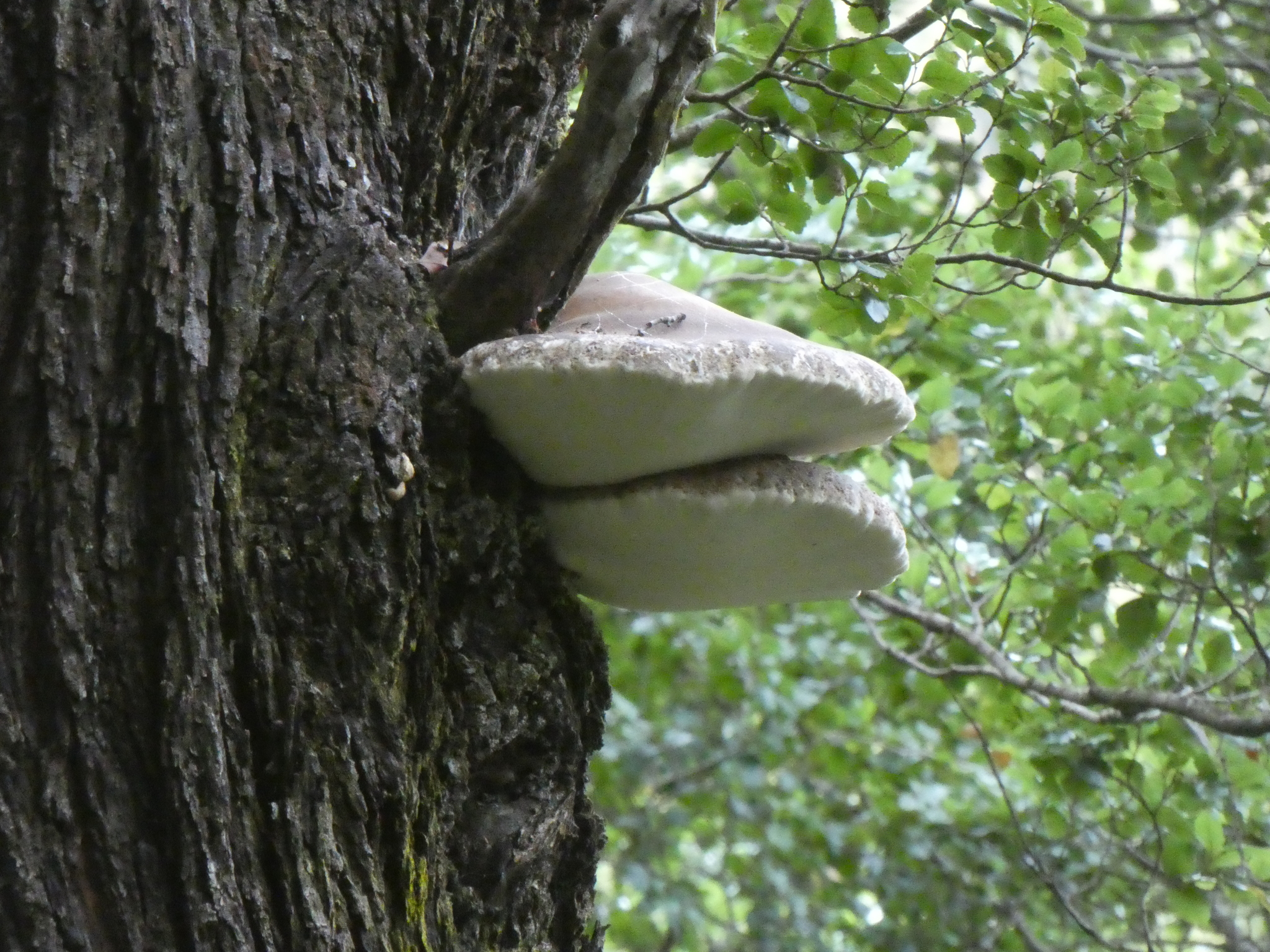
Fruiting bodies growing on a tree

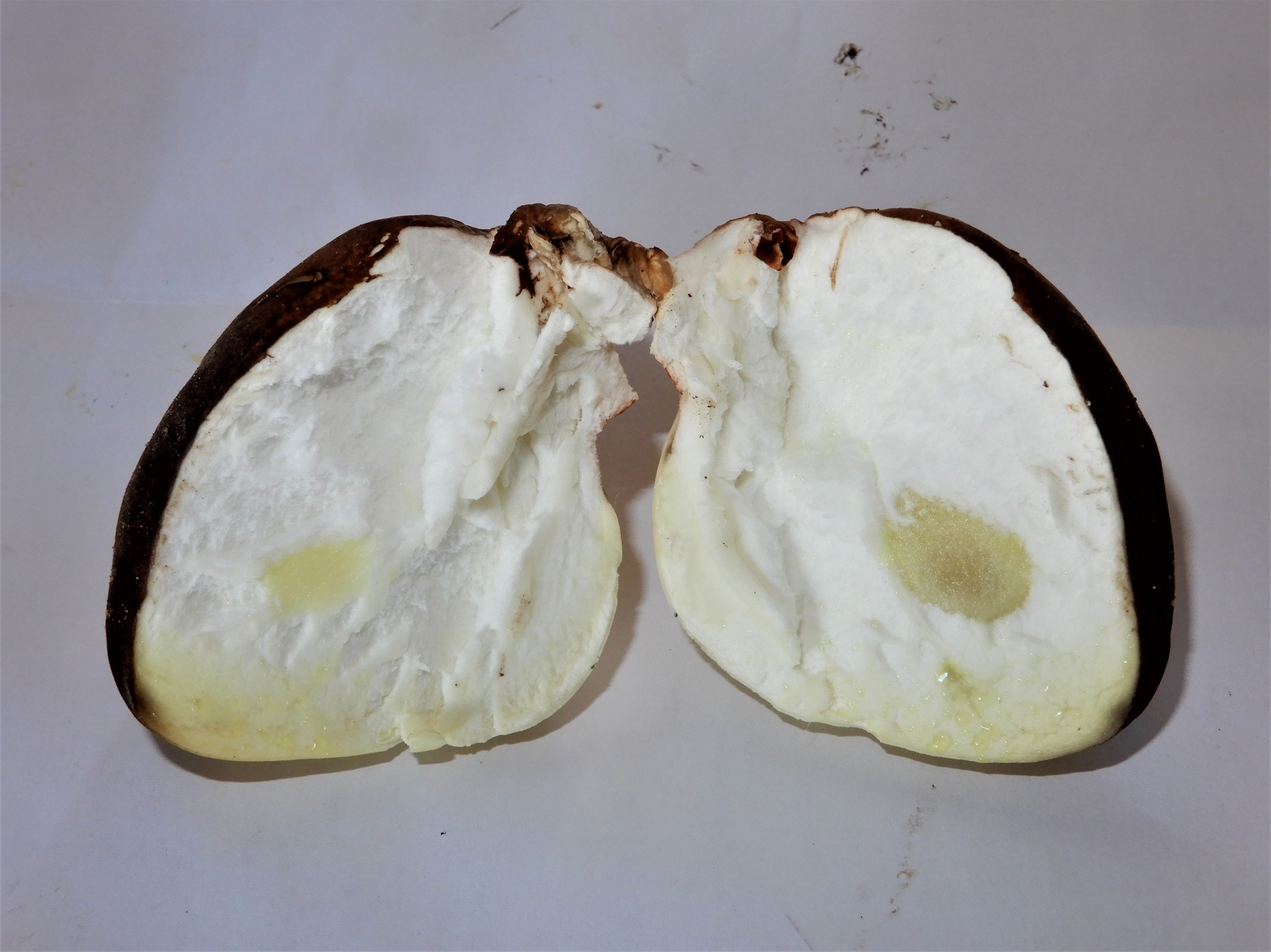
Immature fruiting body sliced open
