= Cattle urine patches =

Grass damage by cattle urine

Urine patches in cattle pastures generate large concentrations of the greenhouse gas nitrous oxide through nitrification and denitrification processes in urine-contaminated soils. Over the past few decades, the cattle population has increased more rapidly than the human population. Between the years 2000 and 2050, the cattle population is expected to increase from 1.5 billion to 2.6 billion. When large populations of cattle are packed into pastures, excessive amounts of urine soak into soils. This increases the rate at which nitrification and denitrification occur and produce nitrous oxide. Currently, nitrous oxide is one of the single most important ozone-depleting emissions and is expected to remain the largest throughout the 21st century.

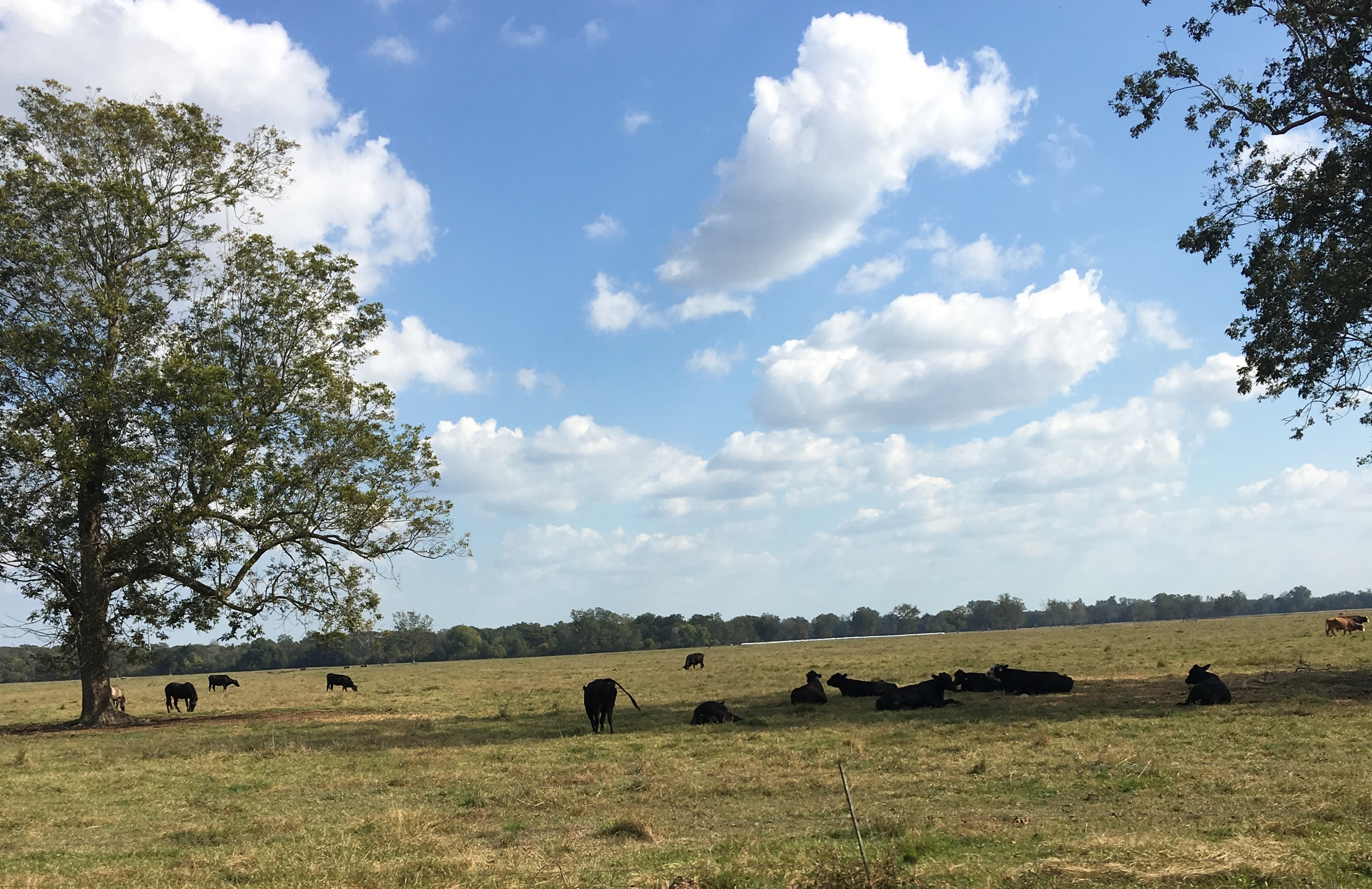
Pasture cows take a break from the hot Louisiana sun to relax in the shade.

== Nitrous oxide environmental impacts ==
Nitrous oxide is a greenhouse gas with a global warming potential 298 times that of carbon dioxide. Global warming potential is a way to compare global warming impacts of different gases relative to carbon dioxide emissions. Since nitrous oxide has such a high global warming potential, it is able to warm the earth more effectively compared to other greenhouse gases. Although generally unreactive in the troposphere, nitrous oxide is destroyed during photolysis or reactions with excited oxygen atoms and catalyzes the destruction of ozone in the stratosphere. The net loss of ozone molecules occurs in a series of photochemical reactions represented below:

$$\begin{align}
\ce{O3 + hv} &\ \ce{-> O + O2} \\
\ce{O + NO2} &\ \ce{-> NO + O2} \\
\ce{NO + O3} &\ \ce{-> NO2 + O2} \\
\hline
\text{net: } \ce{2O3} &\ \ce{-> 3O2}
\end{align}$$

Destruction of stratospheric ozone leaves the biosphere vulnerable to penetrating rays of ultraviolet radiation. Exposure to high amounts of ultraviolet radiation can affect the environment by affecting productivity of crops the human population depends on for food.

== Cattle urine composition ==
Nitrogen concentration of cattle urine varies between approximately 3.0 and 10.5 g/L. Although many nitrogenous constituents are involved in the chemical make-up of cattle urine, urea is dominant. Urea concentration represents 52.0% to 93.5% of total urinary nitrogen and is dependent upon the amount of dietary protein consumed by cattle. Through a process known as ureolysis, the enzyme urease completely hydrolyzes urea to ammonia within one to two days of being excreted and soaked into soils. This reaction is outlined below:

$$\ce{(NH2)2CO + 2H2O -> NH3 + NH4+ + HCO3-}$$

Ammonia is the key product of this reaction that goes on to fuel nitrification.

== The role of the nitrogen cycle in urine-contaminated soils ==
Nitrification and denitrification are two microbial processes that are part of the nitrogen cycle. While denitrification contributes to the bulk production of nitrous oxide, small amounts are also produced during nitrification. When specific environmental factors are met, both processes will occur more quickly and produce higher emissions of nitrous oxide. For example, soils with relatively high temperatures and water-filled pore spaces ranging from 60 to 80% are required for peak performances of both processes.

=== Nitrification ===
Nitrification will occur once ammonia becomes readily available in urine-contaminated soils. Ammonia is oxidized into nitrite and nitrate via nitrifying bacteria. Nitrification is chemically-expressed in two distinct steps as shown below:

==== Step 1 ====
Step 1 details the oxidation of ammonia into nitrite via ammonia-oxidizing bacteria. The most frequent genus of bacteria identified as being the facilitator of this step is Nitrosomonas. These bacteria will produce small quantities of nitrous oxide from produced nitrite in a side reaction. Nitrous oxide emissions increase as soil pH concentration increases or becomes more basic.

$$\ce{NH3 + O2 -> NO2- + 3H+ + 2e-}$$

==== Step 2 ====
Step 2 details the oxidation of nitrite to nitrate via nitrite-oxidizing bacteria. The most frequent genus of bacteria identified as being the facilitator of this step is Nitrobacter. While no quantities of nitrous oxide are produced in this step, the resulting nitrate is used to fuel denitrification.

$$\ce{NO2- + H2O -> NO3- + 2H+ +2e-}$$

=== Denitrification ===
Denitrification is the process that produces the most nitrous oxide. Denitrification involves the reduction of nitrites and nitrates produced during nitrification into nitrous oxide by denitrifying bacteria. Nitrous oxide is subsequently reduced to dinitrogen, the key product of the nitrogen cycle. Nitrous oxide is merely a free obligatory intermediate and is not a major product. Different strains of denitrifying bacteria utilize unique pathways in order to perform denitrification. While these pathways differ from each other, the substrates and products of this process remain the same. Below are two proposed schemes carried out by common denitrifying bacteria:

==== Scheme 1 ====
$$\ce{NO2^- -> \underset{\overset{\displaystyle \uparrow}{\displaystyle NO}}{N2O} -> N_2}$$

Scheme 1 details the denitrification process by Paracoccus denitrificans and Pseudomonas aeruginosa denitrifying bacteria.

==== Scheme 2 ====
$$\begin{align}
\ce{NO2^- -> (X) -> N2O -> N2}
\\ \ce{where \ NO <=> (X)}
\end{align}$$

Scheme 2 represents the denitrification process by Pseudomonas stutzeri. In the above formula, (X) represents a common mononitrogen intermediate such as nitrogen monoxide.

== Efforts to lessen environmental impacts ==
Research suggests lessening the concentrations of nitrous oxide entering the stratosphere will serve to enhance recovery of the damaged stratospheric ozone layer.

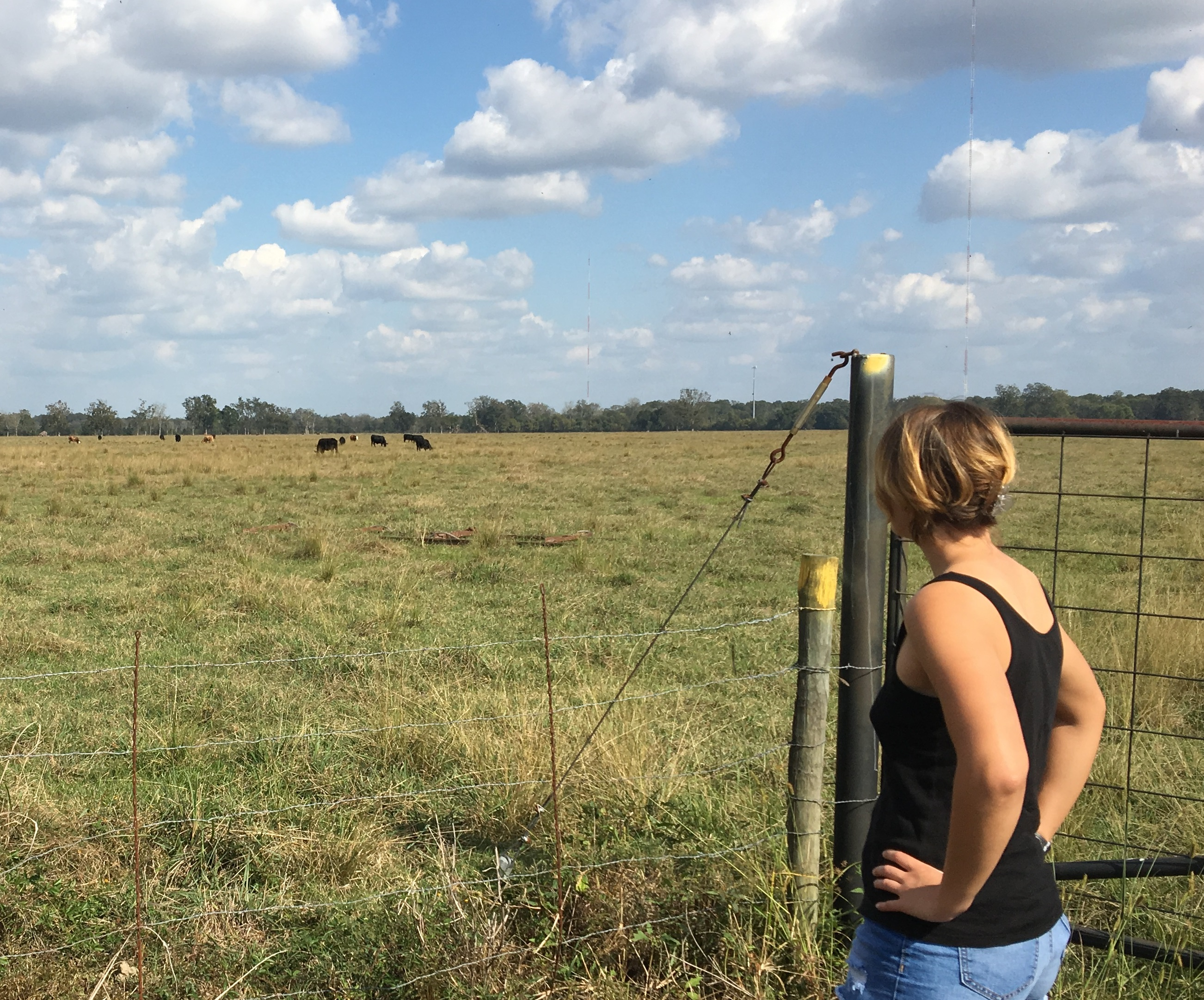
Louisiana local observes cow pasture.

=== Biochar ===
The incorporation of biochar into soil has been investigated to reduce nitrous oxide emissions from ruminant urine patches. Biochar is a carbon-rich compound manufactured from the thermal decomposition of organic matter in oxygen-deprived conditions at relatively low temperatures. Biochar serves to reduce nitrous oxide emissions by altering nitrogen transformation rates in urine-contaminated soils. Detailed field data such as seasonal effects and repeated soil exposure are still lacking and research on this subject is ongoing. However, nitrous oxide emissions have been demonstrated as being reduced by 50 and 80% following the incorporation of biochar into affected soils.

=== Organic agriculture ===
Organic agriculture has shown decreased nitrous oxide emissions through limiting the number of cattle present per hectare of pasture. A decreased number of cattle in one hectare leads to less nitrogenous constituents deposited into the soil at one time and strains the occurrence of nitrification and denitrification. This in turn limits the total amount of nitrous oxide that can be produced.
