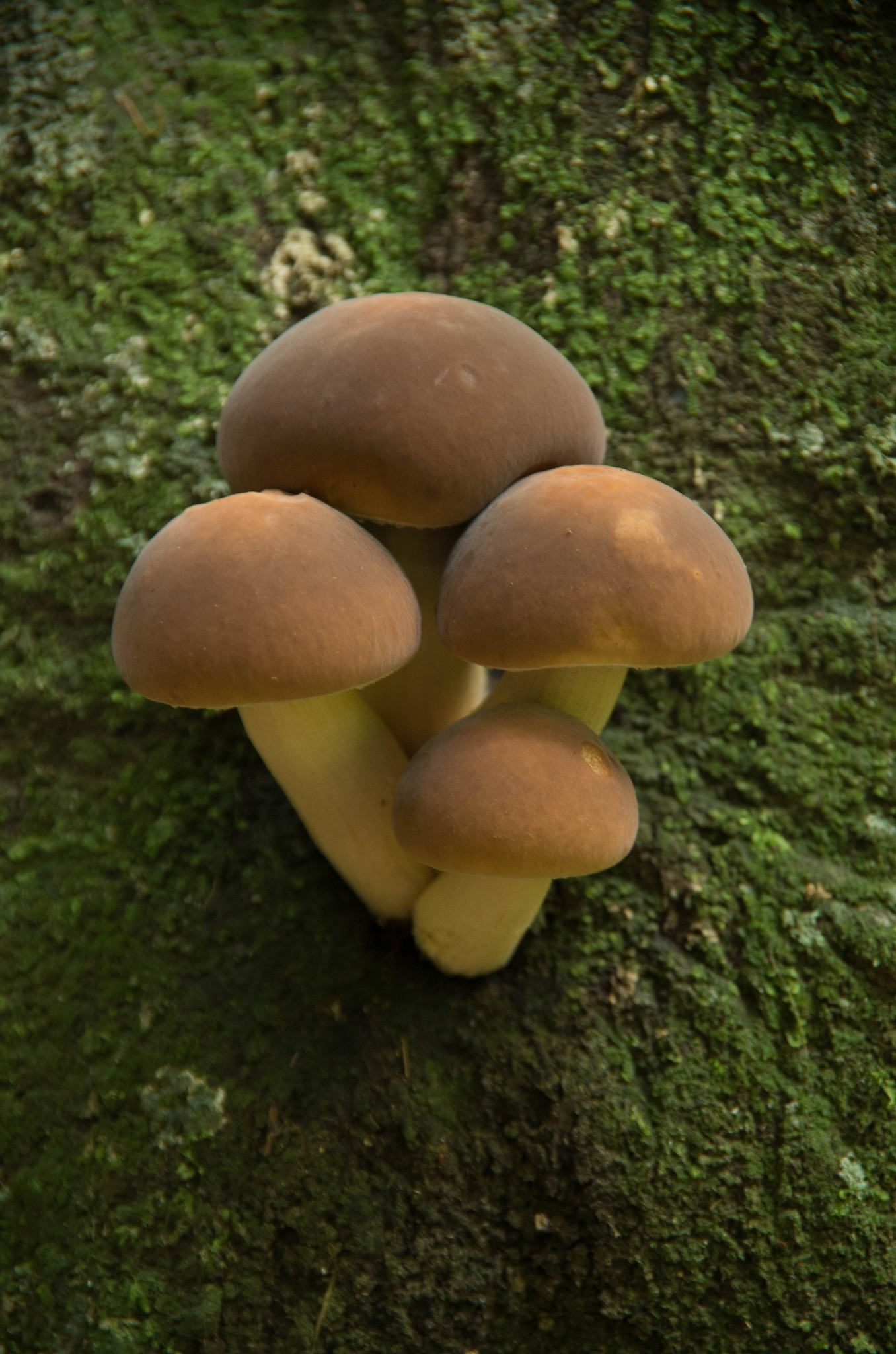

Scientific classification
- Kingdom: Fungi
- Division: Basidiomycota
- Class: Agaricomycetes
- Order: Agaricales
- Family: Tubariaceae
- Genus: Cyclocybe
- Species: C. parasitica

Binomial name
- Cyclocybe parasitica (G.Stev.) Vizzini (2014)

Synonyms
- Agrocybe parasitica G.Stev. (1982)

= Cyclocybe parasitica =

Species of gilled mushroom

Cyclocybe parasitica
- Mycological characteristics
- Gills on hymenium
- Cap is convex
- Hymenium is adnate
- Stipe has a ring
- Spore print is blackish-brown
- Ecology is parasitic
- Edibility is edible

Cyclocybe parasitica, also known as tawaka in Māori language or poplar mushroom, is a species of gilled mushroom in the genus Cyclocybe found in Australasia.

== Description ==
The cap is centrally attached, buff coloured, and darker at center. The stem is pale with white flesh. The partial veil presses against the pink-to-dark gills and turns into a prominent ring, often striated with dark brown spore deposit upon the stem expansion. The spores are cylindrical and thick walled with a prominent germ pore.

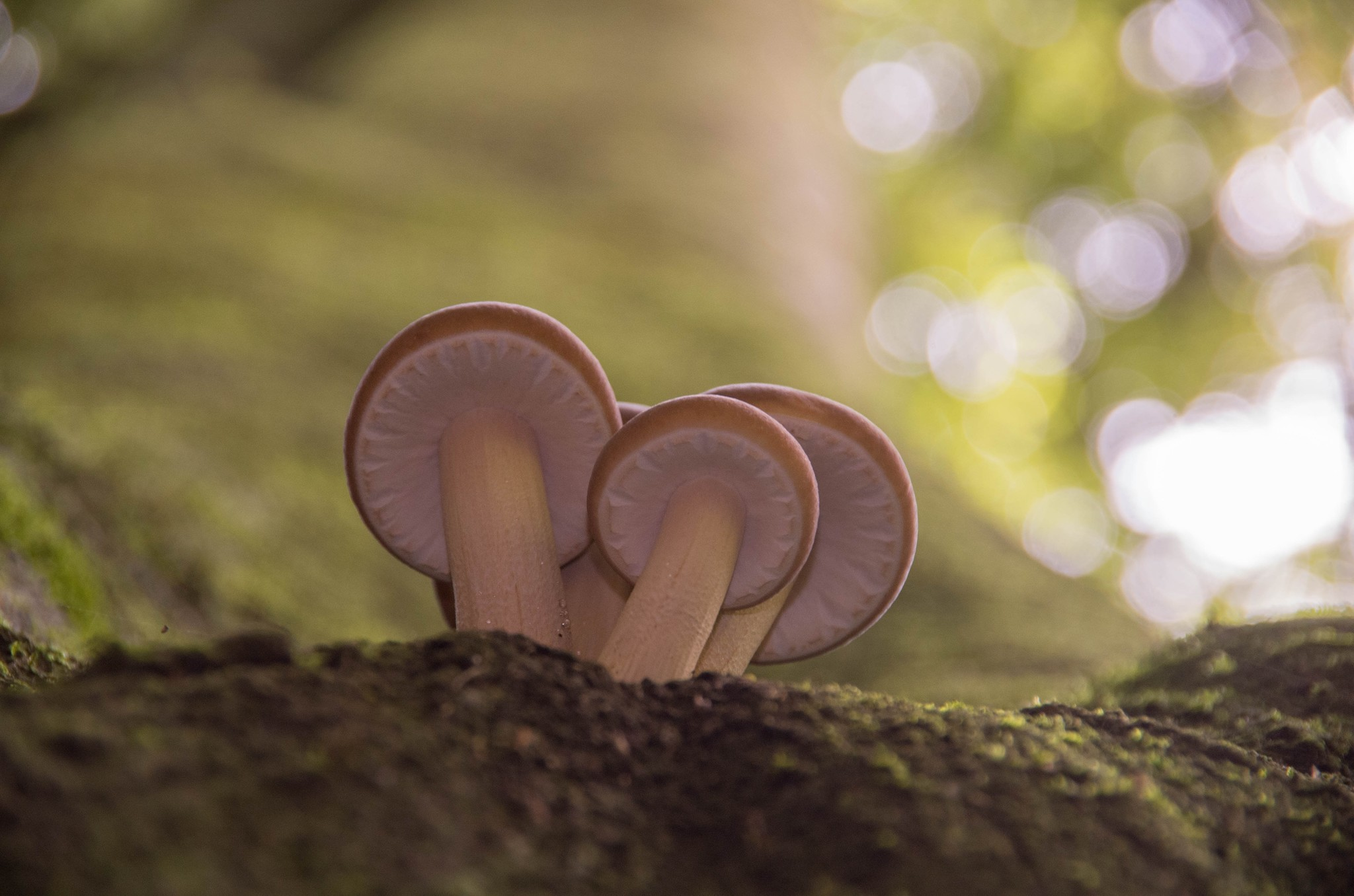
Underside of young fruiting bodies with intact partial veil

=== Similar species ===
It resembles the more orange-coloured Gymnopilus junonius.

== Distribution and habitat ==
The species is found mostly in New Zealand and Australia, from November to June. It grows on native and introduced trees where it can cause heart rot, and does not seem to be associated with conifers.

== Ecology ==
The species grows parasitically and saprotrophically in hardwood trees such as Beilschmiedia tawa, Hoheria or Plagianthus but can also be found on Nothofagus, birches or poplars. It is native and probably indigenous to New Zealand. Fruiting bodies usually occur in late summer and autumn, sometimes single but usually in clusters.

== Uses ==
Tawaka is an edible mushroom with a meaty savoury taste. It can be collected in the wild or cultivated on logs that are inoculated four to eight weeks after cutting and defoliating. According to a study from Lincoln University in 1990, tawaka contains approximately 20% protein in dry mass, which is roughly half of what can be found in the common button mushroom, while the essential amino acid composition is similar. On the other hand, available carbohydrate content is almost three times higher.

Tawaka was historically used by Māori people as a traditional medicine.
