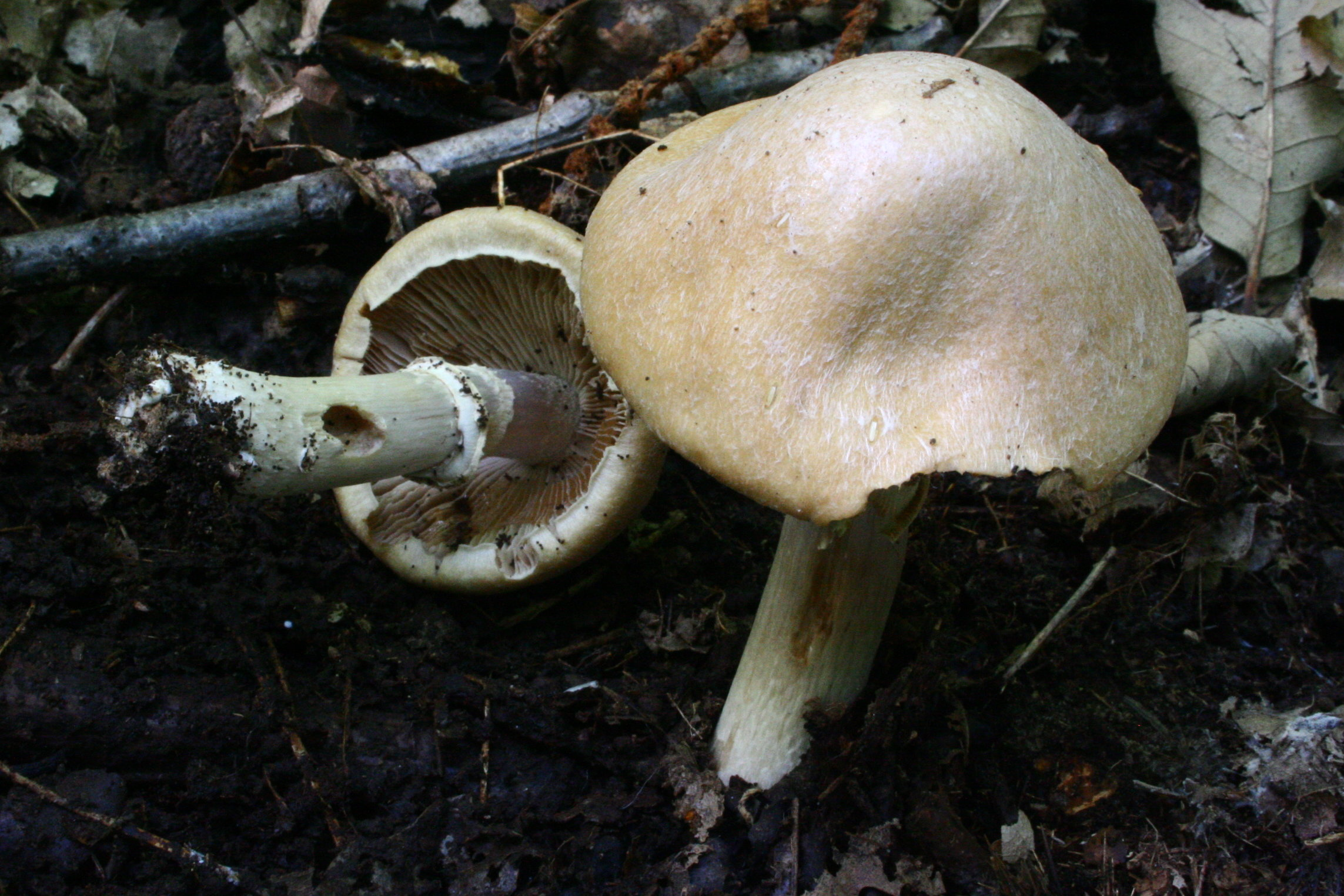
- French specimen

Scientific classification
- Kingdom: Fungi
- Division: Basidiomycota
- Class: Agaricomycetes
- Order: Agaricales
- Family: Cortinariaceae
- Genus: Cortinarius
- Species: C. caperatus

Binomial name
- Cortinarius caperatus (Pers.) Fr. (1838)

Synonyms
- Rozites caperata _{(Pers.) P. Karst.} Pholiota caperata _{(Pers.) Gillet} Dryophila caperata _{(Pers.) Quél.} Togaria caperata _{(Pers.) W.G. Sm.}

= Cortinarius caperatus =

Species of fungus

Cortinarius caperatus
- Mycological characteristics
- Gills on hymenium
- Cap is convex or umbonate
- Hymenium is adnate
- Stipe has a ring
- Spore print is ochre to brown
- Ecology is mycorrhizal
- Edibility is choice

Cortinarius caperatus, commonly known as the wrinkled cort or gypsy mushroom, is a species of fungi of the genus Cortinarius. It was known as Rozites caperata for many years before genetic studies revealed that it belonged to the genus Cortinarius. The Latin specific name, caperatus, means wrinkled and refers to the distinctive texture of the cap. The ochre-coloured cap is up to 10 cm (4 in) across and has a fibrous surface. The clay-colored gills are attached to the stipe under the cap, and the stipe is whitish with a whitish ring. The flesh has a mild smell and flavor. It can resemble a number of other species, including the poisonous Inosperma erubescens in central Europe in summer.

Fruiting bodies of C. caperatus appear in northern parts of Europe and North America in addition to temperate Asia. They can be found in coniferous and beech woods in autumn as well as heathlands in late summer and autumn. The mushrooms have been found to bioaccumulate mercury and radioactive isotopes of caesium and can also be infested by maggots. It is otherwise a highly regarded edible species amongst European mushroom foragers.

== Taxonomy ==
The mushroom was originally described as Agaricus caperatus in 1796 by South African mycologist Christiaan Hendrik Persoon, who noted it grew in beech woods. The specific epithet caperatus is Latin for "wrinkled". Bohemian naturalist Julius Vincenz von Krombholz illustrated it in his Naturgetreue Abbildungen und Beschreibungen der essbaren, schädlichen und verdächtigen Schwämme, published between 1831 and 1846. It was transferred to the genus Cortinarius by the Swedish mycologist Elias Magnus Fries in 1838. Later it was transferred to Pholiota in 1874 by French mycologist Claude Casimir Gillet, a placement followed by Italian naturalist Pier Andrea Saccardo. Finnish mycologist Petter Adolf Karsten established the genus Rozites in 1879 to accommodate the species—as Rozites caperatus—on the basis of the mushroom having a double veil; that is, a partial veil—the remnants of which become a ring on the stipe—as well as a universal veil. It was known as a Rozites species for many years. Meanwhile, French mycologist Lucien Quélet classified Pholiota as a subgenus of Dryophila in 1886, resulting in Dryophila caperata being added to the species' synonymy. Worthington George Smith placed it in his new genus Togaria (now considered a synonym of Agrocybe).

Genetic analysis in 2000 and 2002 showed that Rozites was not a discrete group and its members were nested within Cortinarius. This fungus was found to be closely related to the New Zealand species C. meleagris and C. subcastanellus, both also formerly of Rozites. Hence it has once more been placed within Cortinarius. Within the genus it is classified in the subgenus Cortinarius.

Common names include the gypsy mushroom, gypsy, and wrinkled rozites. In Finland, the common name is granny's nightcap.

== Description ==
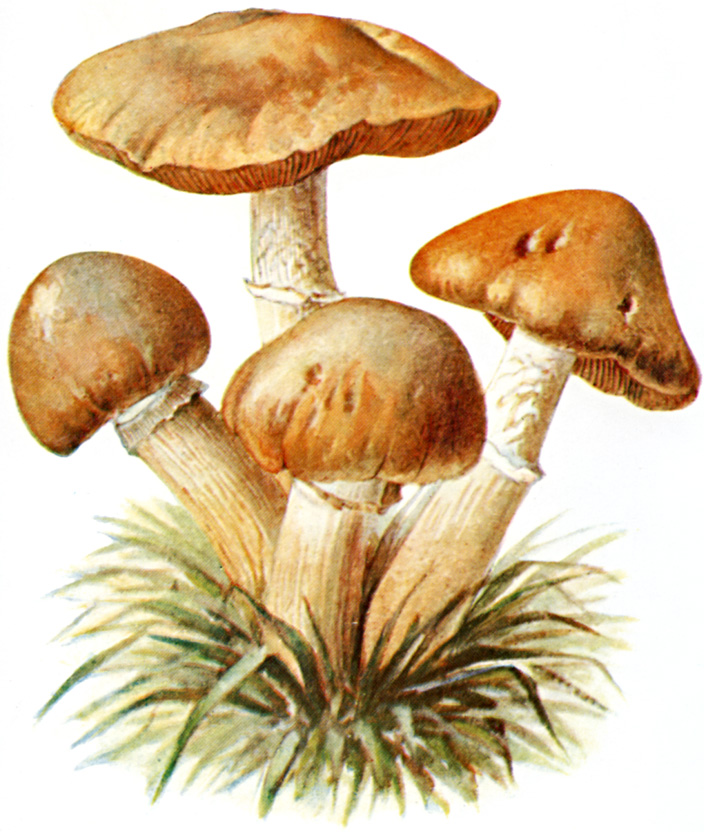
Illustration of C. caperatus by Albin Schmalfuß, 1897

C. caperatus has a buff to brownish-ochre cap 5–12 centimetres (2–4 3/4 in) diameter, which is covered with whitish fibres. The surface has a wrinkled and furrowed texture. It may have a lilac tinge when young. It is convex initially before expanding and flattening with a boss (umbo) in the centre. The stipe is 4–12 cm (1 1/2–4 3/4 in) long and 1–2.2 cm (1/2–3/4 in) thick; it is slightly swollen at the base, and whitish to beige with a noteworthy whitish ring, which is initially attached to the cap. The partial veil is a key identifying feature of the mushroom. The spores give an ochre-brown spore print. The warty almond-shaped spores measure 10–13 μm long by 8–9 μm wide. The flesh is cream-coloured and the flavor mild.

=== Similar species ===
Similar-looking North American species include Agrocybe praecox, which lacks the wrinkled cap and is found in cultivated areas, and Phaeolepiota aurea, which has a powdery-granular surface. Members of the Cortinarius subgenus Telamonia have thin rings and C. corrugatus has none, with a wrinkled cap.

In central Europe, old specimens could be mistaken for the highly poisonous Inosperma erubescens in summer, and young mushrooms for the inedible Cortinarius traganus, although the latter is readily distinguished by its unpleasant odour.

== Distribution and habitat ==
C. caperatus is found across northern Europe, mainly in Scandinavia, where it is common, although it is uncommon in Denmark and Iceland. In the British Isles it is uncommon outside the Scottish Highlands and the New Forest. It has been classified as vulnerable in Germany and Great Britain and endangered in the Netherlands. C. caperatus had become less common in the vicinity of Salzburg in Austria between 1937 and 1988, thought due to picking.

It is widely found in northern parts of North America, as far south as Mendocino County on the west coast. It is uncommon in California. C. caperatus is a rare component of subarctic areas of western Greenland. The fungus also grows in temperate Asia, having been recorded growing with bilberry near oriental beech (Fagus orientalis) and fir near Pamukova in the Marmara Region of Turkey. It is also found in boggy areas of the taiga (boreal pine forest) in western Siberia.

Fruiting bodies sprout from August to October in conifer and beech woods, as well as heather (often close by sphagnum) in Scotland. It is mycorrhizal but non-selective in its hosts. Mushrooms appear from September to November in North America, and July and August in Alaska. It prefers acidic and sandy soils and avoids chalky ones, and may be found in the same habitats as bay bolete (Imleria badia), brown roll-rim (Paxillus involutus), and chanterelles. It forms relationships with Scots pine (Pinus sylvestris). It is often found under Sitka spruce (Picea sitchensis), or near huckleberry in North America. In Alaska it grows with dwarf birch (Betula nana) and American dwarf birch (B. glandulosa). In Greenland, it grows in association with white birch (B. pubescens).

== Potential contamination ==
The popularity of C. caperatus across Europe has led to safety concerns related to its propensity to accumulate contaminants. Fungi are very efficient at absorbing radioactive isotopes of caesium from the soil and naturally have trace amounts of the element. Caesium may take the place of potassium, which exists in high concentrations in mushrooms. C. caperatus bioaccumulates radioactive caesium ^{137}Cs—a product of nuclear testing—much more than many other mushroom species. Levels dramatically rose after the 1986 Chernobyl disaster. This is a potential health issue as picking and eating wild mushrooms is a popular pastime in central and eastern Europe. Elevated ^{137}Cs levels were also found in ruminants that eat mushrooms in Scandinavia in the 1990s. Mushrooms from Reggio Emilia in Italy were found to have raised levels of ^{134}Cs. C. caperatus from various sites across Poland has also been found to contain increased levels of mercury.

Additionally, picked mushrooms are often found to be infested with maggots.

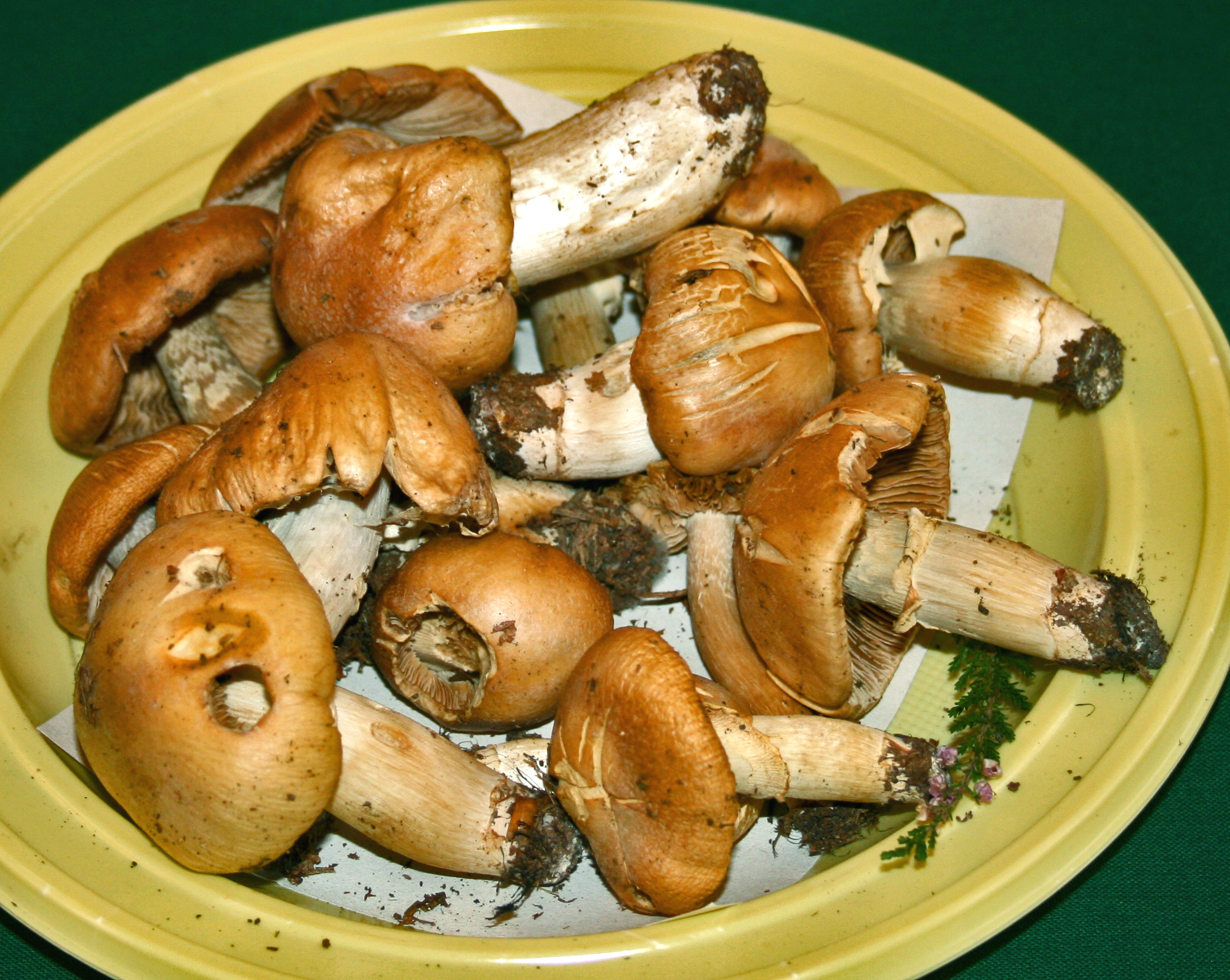
A plate of raw mushrooms on display in Prague

== Edibility ==
C. caperatus is a highly regarded edible mushroom with a mild to good flavour. It is said to mix well with stronger-flavoured fungi such as chanterelles, boletes, brittlegills or milk-caps. The mushroom can have a faintly bitter taste if eaten raw, but a pleasant nutty flavour when cooked. It can readily be dried for later use, such as adding to soups and stews. It is sold commercially in Finland, and is a popular target of foragers in many parts of Europe. Mycologist David Arora recommends discarding the tough stipes.

== See also ==
- List of Cortinarius species
