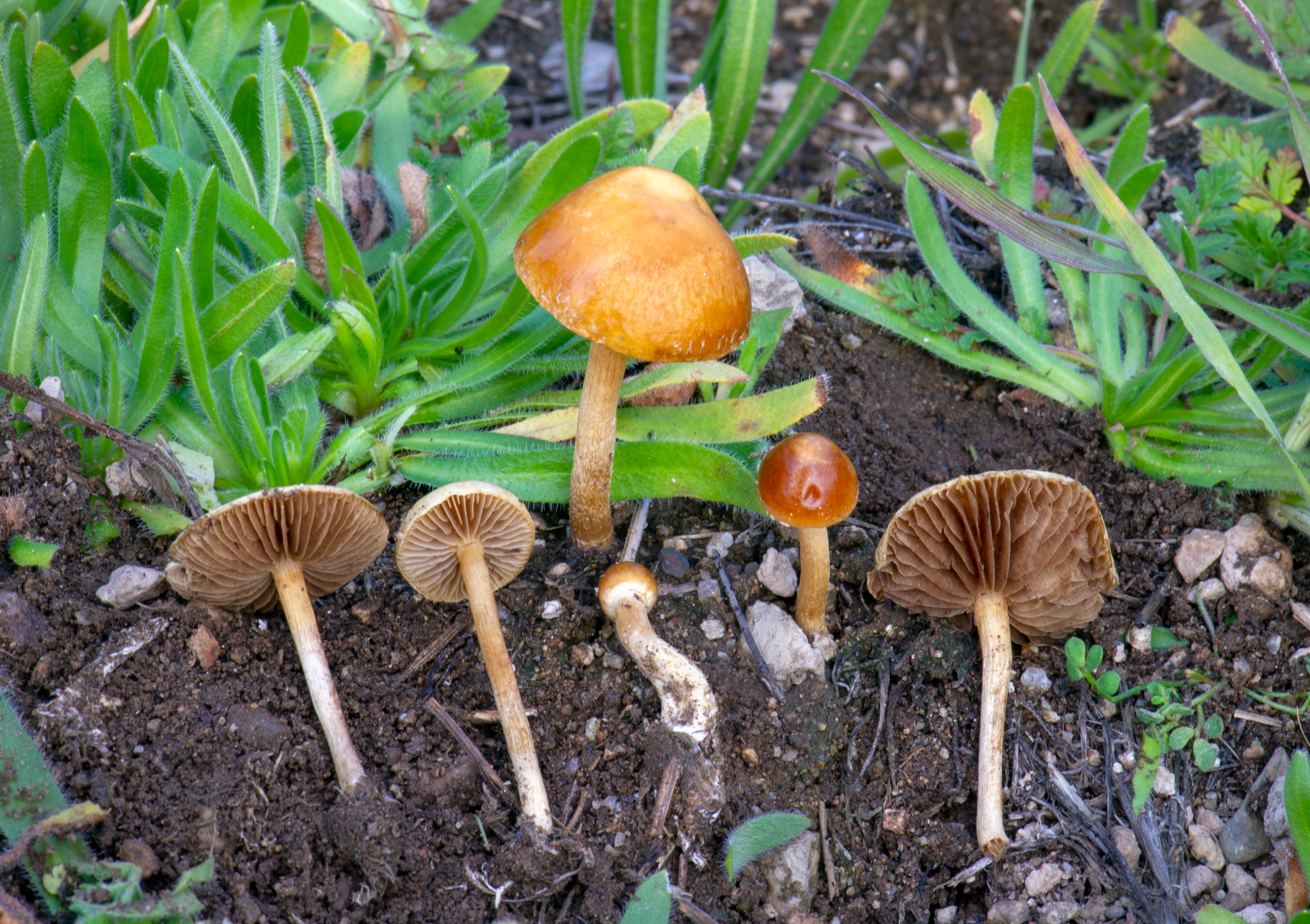

Scientific classification
- Kingdom: Fungi
- Division: Basidiomycota
- Class: Agaricomycetes
- Order: Agaricales
- Family: Strophariaceae
- Genus: Agrocybe
- Species: A. pediades

Binomial name
- Agrocybe pediades (Fr.) Fayod

Synonyms
- Agrocybe semiorbicularis (Bull.) Quél.

= Agrocybe pediades =

Species of fungus

Agrocybe pediades Mycological characteristics
- Gills on hymenium
- Cap is convex
- Hymenium attachment is not applicable
- Stipe is bare
- Spore print is brown
- Ecology is saprotrophic
- Edibility is edible but not recommended

Agrocybe pediades, commonly known as the common fieldcap, common agrocybe, or hemispheric fieldcap, is a species of fungus. It can be found on grassland. It is potentially edible, but it could be confused with poisonous species, including one of the genus Hebeloma.

== Taxonomy ==
It was first described as Agaricus pediades by Swedish mycologist Elias Magnus Fries in 1821, and moved to its current genus, Agrocybe, by Victor Fayod in 1889. A synonym for this mushroom is Agrocybe semiorbicularis, though some guides list these separately.

== Description ==
The mushroom cap is 1–3 cm wide, round to convex (flattening with age), pale yellow to orangish-brown, smooth but sometimes cracked, and tacky with moisture but otherwise dry. The stalks are 2–7 cm long and 1–4 mm wide. A partial veil quickly disappears, leaving traces on the cap's edge, but no ring on the stem. The cap's odor and taste are mild or mealy.

The spores are brown, elliptical, and smooth, producing a brown spore print. Some experts divide A. pediades into several species, mainly by habitat and microscopic features, such as spore size. It is recognized by the large, slightly compressed basidiospores which have a large central germ pore, 4-spored basidia, subcapitate cheilocystidia and, rarely, the development of pleurocystidia.

=== Similar species ===
Other similar species include Agrocybe praecox and A. putaminum. Hypholoma tuberosum is also similar.

== Habitat ==
It typically can be found on lawns and other types of grassland, but can also grow on mulch containing horse manure. It appears year-round in North America.

== Uses ==
This species is edible, but it could be confused with poisonous species, including one of the genus Hebeloma and various little brown mushrooms. Some field guides just list it as inedible or say that it is not worthwhile.
