= Agrocybe pallida =

Scientific classification
- Kingdom: Fungi
- Division: Basidiomycota
- Class: Agaricomycetes
- Order: Agaricales
- Family: Strophariaceae
- Genus: Agrocybe
- Species: A. pallida

Binomial name
- Agrocybe pallida (Murrill) Watling

Synonyms
- Collybia pallida (Murrill) Murrill; Flammula pallida (Murrill) Murrill; Gymnopilus pallidus Murrill; Psilocybe pallidispora (Murrill) A.H.Sm.

Species of fungus

Agrocybe pallida
- Mycological characteristics
- Gills on hymenium
- Cap is convex
- Hymenium is adnexed or adnate
- Ecology is saprotrophic

Agrocybe pallidus is a species of mushroom in the family Strophariaceae.

== See also ==
- List of Gymnopilus species
