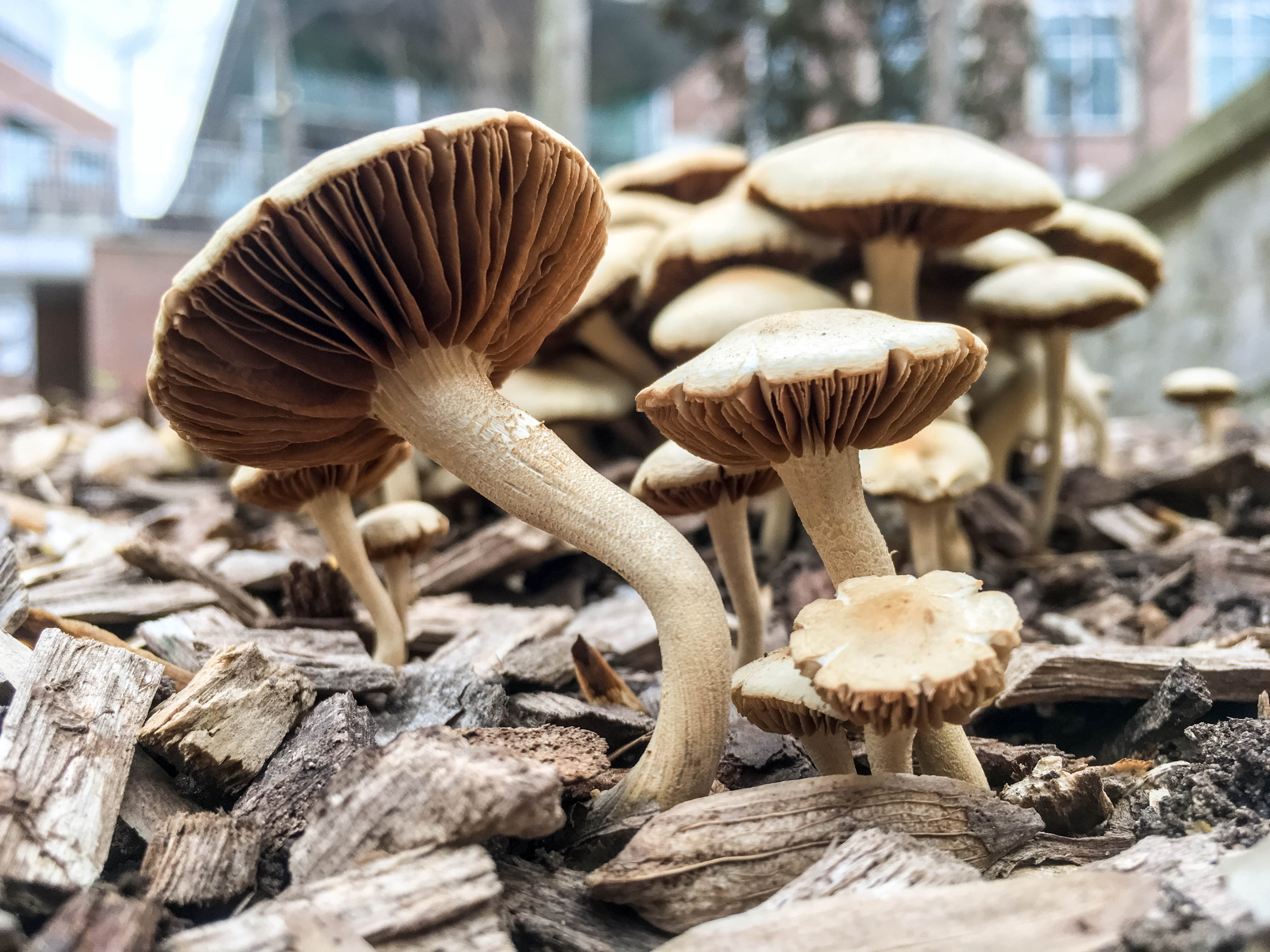

Scientific classification
- Kingdom: Fungi
- Division: Basidiomycota
- Class: Agaricomycetes
- Order: Agaricales
- Family: Strophariaceae
- Genus: Agrocybe
- Species: A. sororia

Binomial name
- Agrocybe sororia (Peck) Singer

Synonyms
- Naucoria sororia (Peck)

= Agrocybe sororia =

Species of fungus

Agrocybe sororia
- Mycological characteristics
- Gills on hymenium
- Cap is convex
- Hymenium is adnate
- Stipe is bare
- Spore print is brown
- Ecology is saprotrophic
- Edibility is edible, but unpalatable

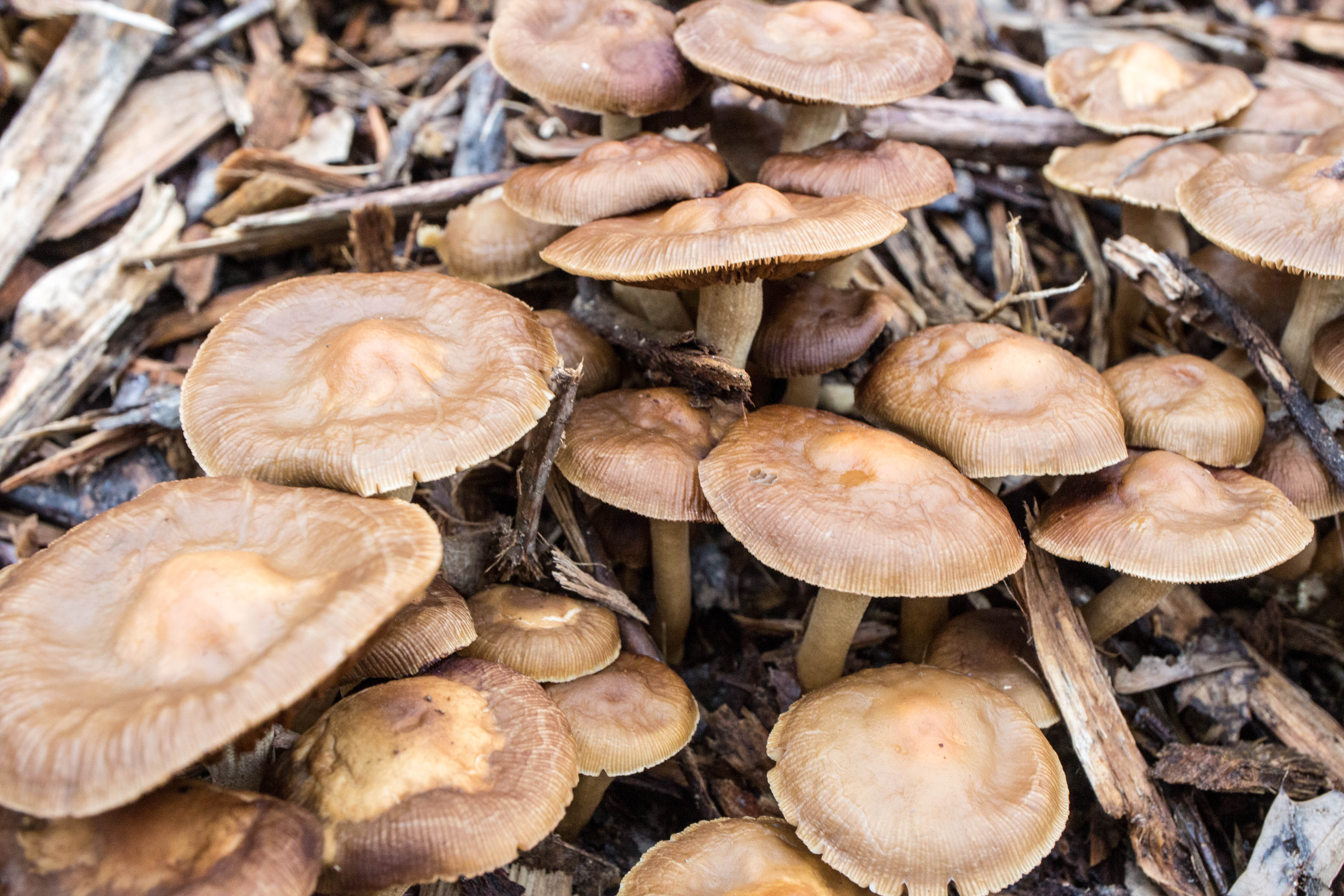
Agrocybe sororia

Agrocybe sororia is a species of Basidiomycota mushroom in the genus Agrocybe.

The cap is convex to plane, tawny fading to pale yellow-buff; and is sometimes cracked, or wrinkled. It is 5-10 cm in diameter and non-hygrophanous.

The gills have an adnate attachment to the stipe. They are 2-5 mm thick and white when young, turning yellowish brown to dull brown with age. The spores are cinnamon-brown and subovoid to ellipsoid, with 1 μm truncated germ pores. The basidia have 2-4 sterigmata and inconspicuous hilar appendages.

The stipe is cylindrical, concolor with the cap and lacks a ring or partial veil. The base of the stipe is club-shaped, fibrillose and 3.4-5(1.2) x 0.4-0.9 cm, in size. It has white mycelium and rhizomorphs.

The odour and taste is mealy (not bitter). Agrocybe sororia is distributed in eastern North America. It is found in wood mulch, composts and grassy areas and is saprotrophic.

== Similar species ==
A. firma is similar but it has dark-brown pileus and lacks of mealy odour. A. putaminum has a mealy odour, bitter taste and pileocystidia.
