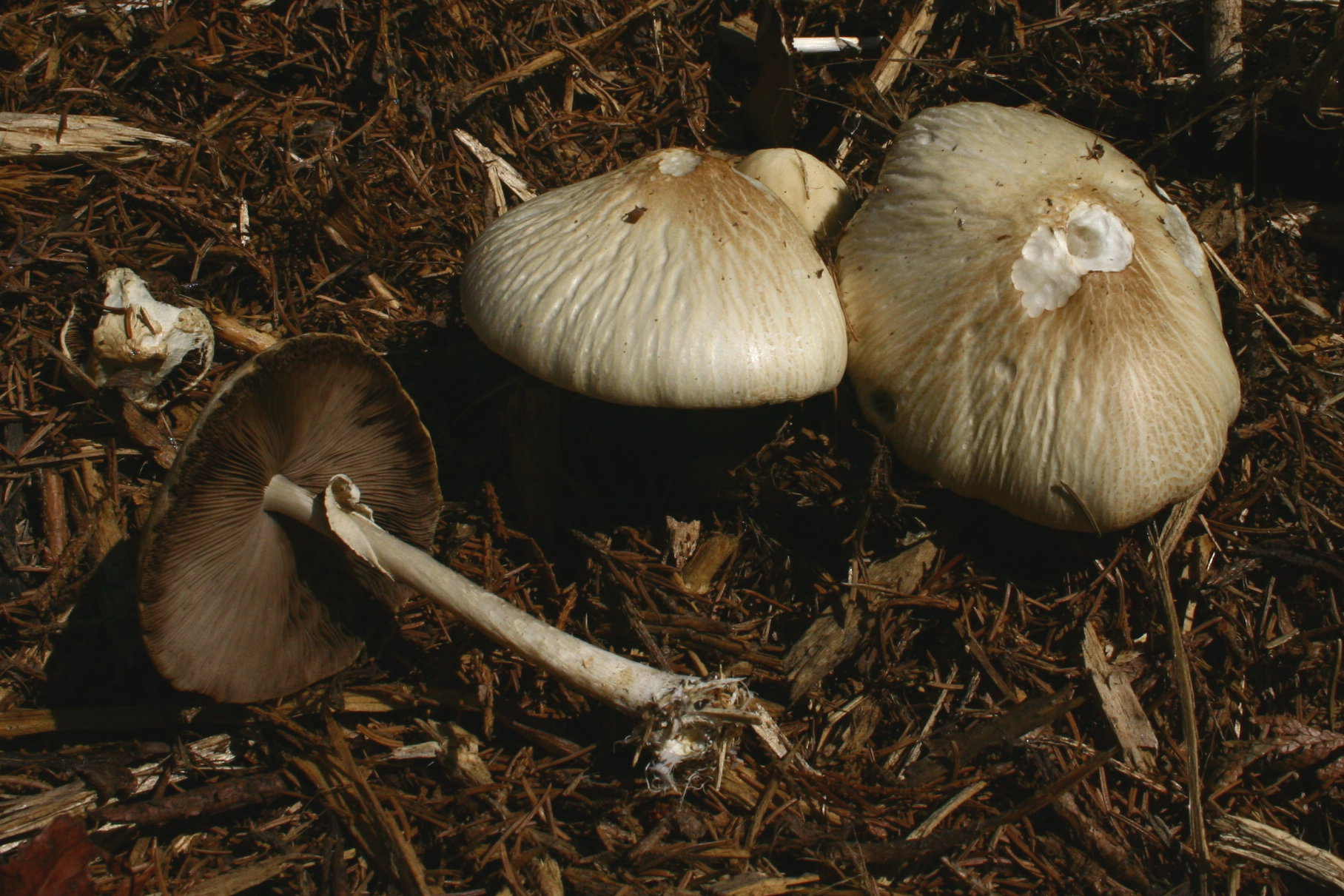

Scientific classification
- Kingdom: Fungi
- Division: Basidiomycota
- Class: Agaricomycetes
- Order: Agaricales
- Family: Strophariaceae
- Genus: Agrocybe
- Species: A. rivulosa

Binomial name
- Agrocybe rivulosa Nauta

= Agrocybe rivulosa =

Species of fungus

Agrocybe rivulosa (wrinkled fieldcap) is a species of mushroom in the genus Agrocybe. The first recorded sighting of the mushroom was in 2003. The species was first found in Britain in the year 2004. It is a relatively large mushroom, with a stem of 5 to 10 centimeters, and a cap which reaches 4 to 10 centimeters across. The colour of the cap ranges from yellow to pale orange-brown. It has been eaten, and is reasonably tasty with no obvious toxicity.
