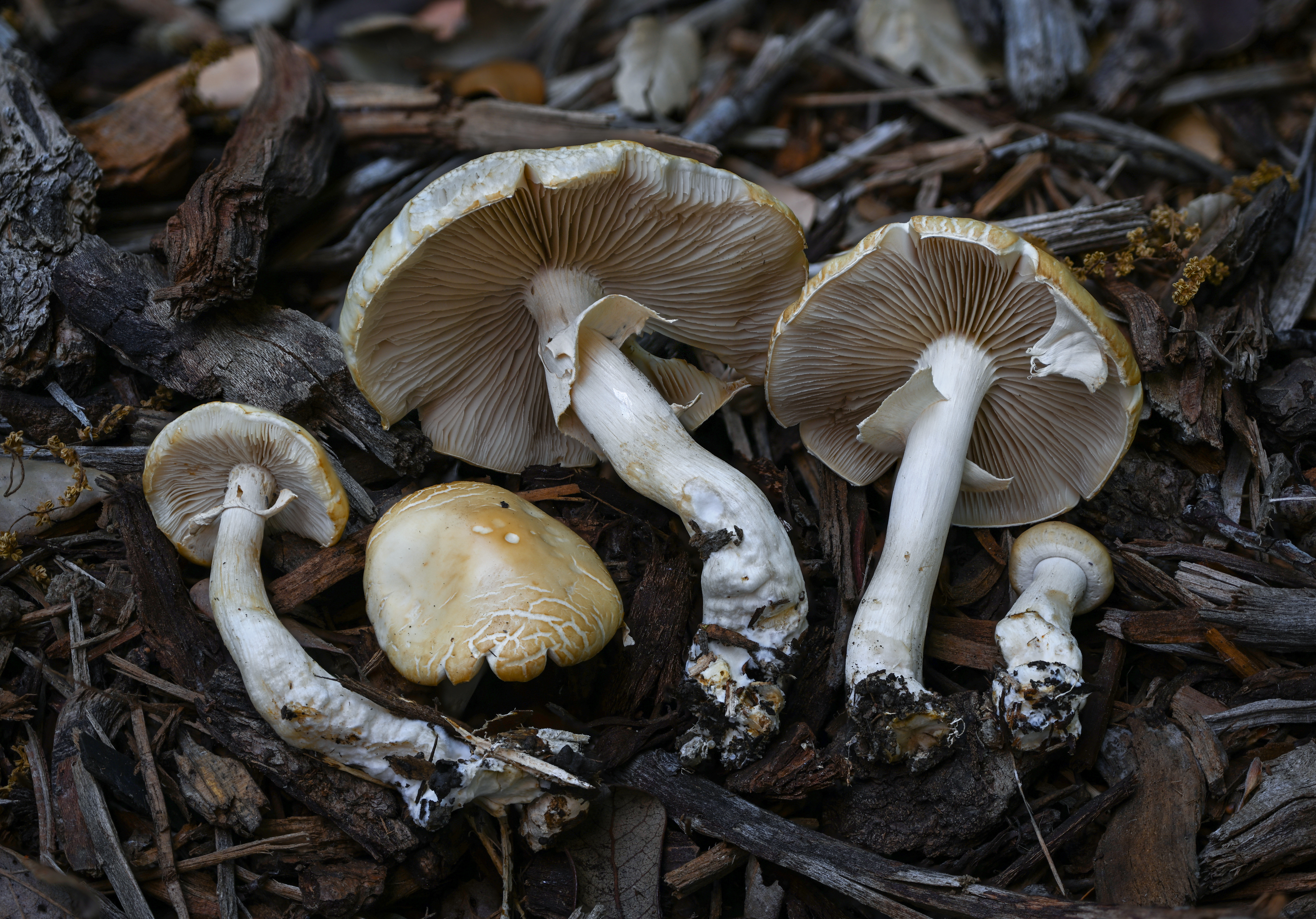

Scientific classification
- Kingdom: Fungi
- Division: Basidiomycota
- Class: Agaricomycetes
- Order: Agaricales
- Family: Strophariaceae
- Genus: Agrocybe
- Species: A. praecox

Binomial name
- Agrocybe praecox (Pers.) Fayod

= Agrocybe praecox =

Species of fungus

Agrocybe praecox Mycological characteristics
- Gills on hymenium
- Cap is convex
- Hymenium is adnexed
- Stipe has a ring
- Spore print is brown
- Ecology is saprotrophic
- Edibility is not recommended

Agrocybe praecox, commonly known as the spring agrocybe, early agrocybe, or spring fieldcap, is a species of fungus. According to modern analysis, it is one of a cluster of closely similar species, known as the A. praecox complex.

It appears early in the year in woods, gardens, and fields in Eurasia, North Africa, and North America. It is of debatable culinary interest.

== Taxonomy ==
The mushroom was first described by Christiaan Hendrik Persoon in 1800 as Agaricus praecox. In 1889, Victor Fayod devised the new genus Agrocybe and made A. praecox the type species.

A 1990 study by Timothy Flynn and O. K. Miller finds that A. praecox is one of four species which are indistinguishable using superficial characteristics but which can be separated through their habitat and location. If this proposal is accepted, the cluster consists of A. molesta and three other species which do not yet have proper names, but which are referred to as "Flynn & Miller Species I–III". The three provisional species correspond to the older names A. acericola, A. elatella, A. praecox, and A. sphaleromorpha combined; and their synonyms. According to the traditional system, various detailed morphological characteristics can be used to choose between the species, but such is variation amongst individuals that it is difficult to achieve a consistent identification in this way.

The Latin epithet praecox ('early') is related to the word "precocious" and refers to the fact that this species often appears early in the year.

== Description ==
Agrocybe praecox belongs to a group of species which are difficult to distinguish consistently.

The cap is up to 10 centimeters (4 inches) wide, bun-shaped and brownish then convex and lightening to tannish (beige when dry and yellowish-brown when moist), and smooth. Veil remnants are often visible around the rim. The gills are initially pale grayish, later brown. The stem is pale, 4 to 12 cm (1 1/2 to 4 3/4 in) long and up to about 2 cm thick, with a fragile ring. They often have white mycelial cords at the base. The odor and taste are floury. The taste may be bitter.

The spores are 8–10 x 5–7 μm, elliptical, and brown en masse.

=== Similar species ===
The following species are closely related to A. praecox, according to Index Fungorum and other sources.

Species, author & date	Description & References	Relation to A. praecox
Agrocybe acericola (Peck) Singer (1950)	Found on woody debris in hardwood forests, cap yellow-brown, often veined or wrinkled in the centre. May be the same as Flynn & Miller Species III.	Not distinguished from A. praecox in Funga Nordica.
Agrocybe dura (Bolton) Singer (1936)	This is a synonym of A. molesta (the name A. dura is preferred by Funga Nordica).	See A. molesta.
Agrocybe elatella (P. Karst.) Vesterh. (1989) (= A. paludosa)	Grows amongst moss in marshes and fens.	Smaller with more slender stipe, hygrophanous, stem not bulbous.
Agrocybe gibberosa (Fr.) Fayod (1889)	Synonym of A. praecox.	Same.
Agrocybe molesta (Lasch) Singer (1978) (= A. dura)	This is certainly a distinct species which grows in grass, but according to Flynn & Miller it is part of the A. praecox complex, and the only species which gets its nutrition from grass (rather than wood chips).	It is bigger and fleshier than A. praecox, the cap surface develops superficial cracks and the spores are somewhat bigger.
Agrocybe paludosa (J.E. Lange) Kühner & Romagn. (1953)	This is a synonym of A. elatella.	See A. elatella.
Agrocybe sphaleromorpha (Bull.) Fayod (1889)	Not distinguished from A. praecox in Funga Nordica	Smaller, having a bulbous stipe, found in pasture.
Flynn & Miller Species I (1990)	Temporary name for first proposed new species.	Grows in gardens on wood chip mulch.
Flynn & Miller Species II (1990)	Temporary name for second proposed new species.	Grows on wood litter in coniferous or aspen forests in western North America.
Flynn & Miller Species III (1990)	Temporary name for third proposed new species.	Grows on wood litter in broadleaf forests (especially with maples) in eastern North America. May be the same as A. acericola.

Another similar species is A. smithii.

== Habitat and distribution ==
It can grow alone or gregarious in grass, compost, or on wood debris in woods and gardens. Like other Agrocybes, it is a saprophyte.

It has a widespread distribution in North America (spring to summer), Europe, Asia, and North Africa. Also it has been reported from Mongolia, Siberia, Sri Lanka, South Korea, Japan, New Zealand, Argentina and Colombia.

== Uses ==
The species is not flavorful but is sometimes considered edible, but because it belongs to a group, it may overlap with some inedible taxa. According to one French source, due to its bitterness and soft consistency, it is best left aside. One site says that it is edible but needs to be well cooked. Roger Phillips lists it as inedible.
