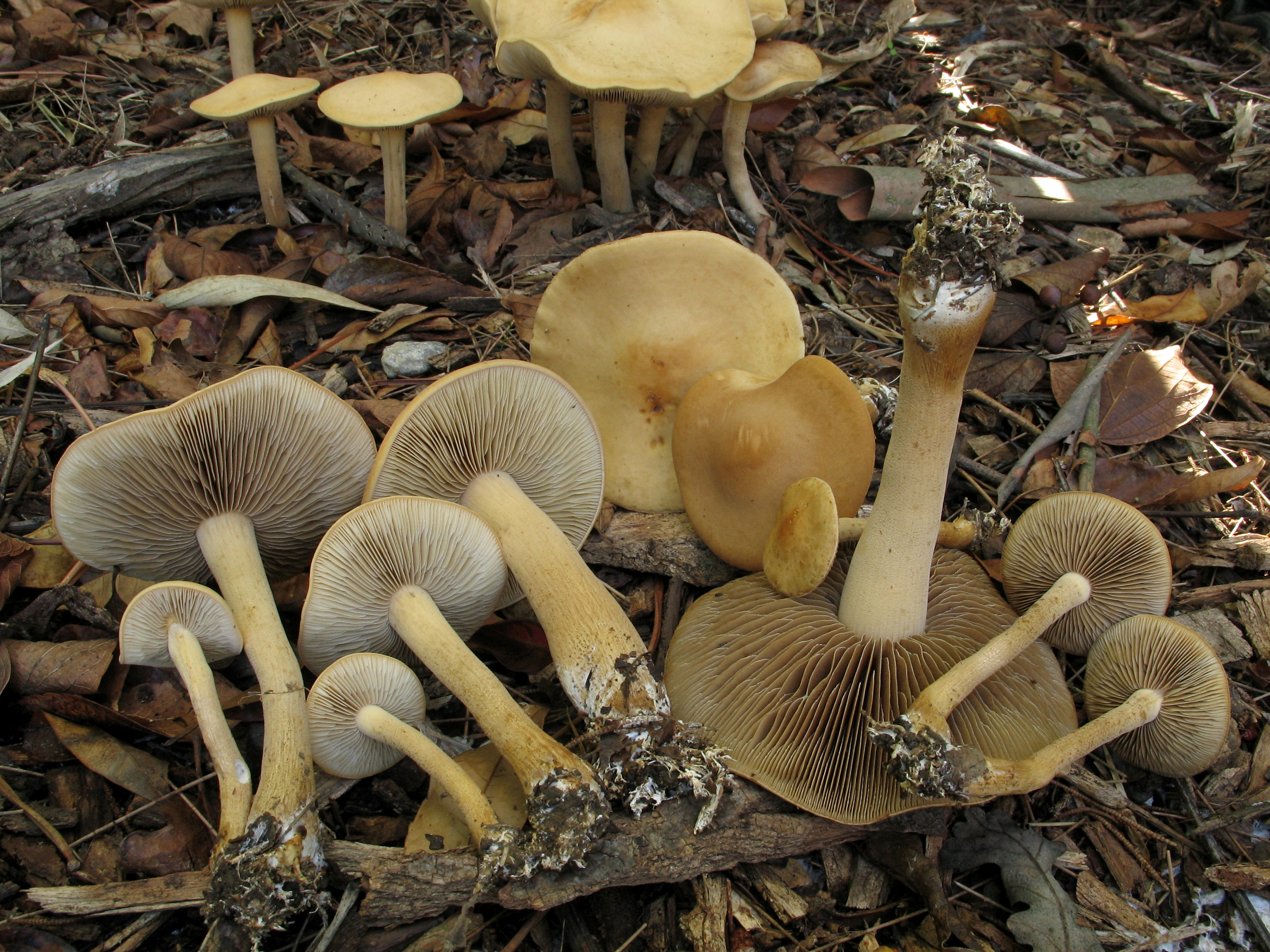

Scientific classification
- Kingdom: Fungi
- Division: Basidiomycota
- Class: Agaricomycetes
- Order: Agaricales
- Family: Strophariaceae
- Genus: Agrocybe
- Species: A. putaminum

Binomial name
- Agrocybe putaminum (Maire) Singer (1936)

Synonyms
- Naucoria putaminum Maire (1913)

= Agrocybe putaminum =

Species of fungus

Agrocybe putaminum, commonly known as the mulch fieldcap, is a species of agaric fungus in the family Strophariaceae in the Agrocybe sororia complex. It was described as new to science in 1913. The fruitbodies have a dull brownish-orange cap with a matte texture, a grooved stipe, and a bitter, mealy taste. They are inedible.

It grows in parks, gardens, and roadsides in woodchip mulch in Eurasia, Australia, and western North America.

== Taxonomy ==
First described as Naucoria putaminum by French mycologist René Maire in 1913, from garden soil that was covered in plum stones. It was transferred to the genus Agrocybe by Rolf Singer in 1936. It is commonly known as the mulch fieldcap.

== Description ==
The fruitbodies have a convex cap that later flattens out in maturity, sometimes developing a shallow umbo; the cap attains a diameter of 3–10 cm (1 1/4–4 in). Its color is initially dark brown, but fades to pale yellowish tan in age. The cap surface is smooth, matte, and is finely pruinose–as if coated with very fine flour. The gills, which have an adnate attachment to the stipe, are pale clay-brown in color, but later deepen to become dark brown after the spores mature. The gills are moderately crowded together, and are interspersed with lamellulae (short gills that do not extend fully from the cap margin to the stipe).

The cylindrical stipe measures 5–8 cm (2–3 1/4 in) long by 1–1.5 cm (1/2–1/2 in) thick, and is thicker at both the apex and the club-shaped base. Initially stuffed with a cottony pith, the stipe eventually becomes hollow. It is the same color as the cap, and has a surface marked by thin raised ridges (particularly near the top); these ridges originate from mycelial cords. The flesh of the mushroom is white, up to 1.5 cm (1/2 in) thick, and does not change color when cut or otherwise injured. Its odor is both farinaceous (like freshly ground flour) and fungal, while its taste is bitter, with a cucumber aftertaste. The mushrooms are not edible.

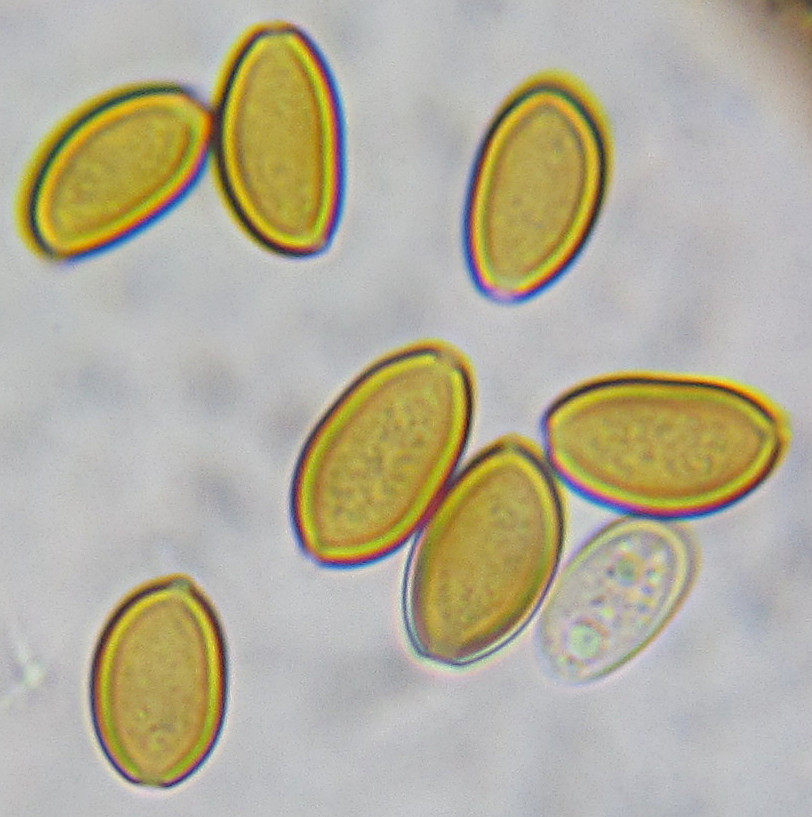
Spores are thick-walled and have a germ pore.

Agrocybe putaminum produces a dark brown spore print. The spores are roughly elliptical, smooth, thick-walled with a germ pore, and measure 10–12 by 5–9 μm. The basidia (spore-bearing cells) are club-shaped, four-spored, and measure 25–30 by 10–15 μm. The stipe is covered in caulocystidia, which gives it a velvety texture.

Agrocybe putaminum
- Mycological characteristics
- Gills on hymenium
- Cap is convex
- Hymenium is adnate
- Stipe has a ring
- Spore print is blackish-brown
- Ecology is saprotrophic
- Edibility is inedible

=== Similar species ===
The eastern North American species Agrocybe smithii is similar in appearance to A. putaminum. It can be distinguished microscopically from the latter by the size and morphology of its cystidia (broadly club-shaped to lageniform, 45–60 by 12.5–20 μm), and the absence of pilocystidia. Agrocybe sororia is also found in eastern North America. Another lookalike, A. hortensis, lacks pleurocystidia and has broader cheilocystidia (11–25 μm) than A. putaminum. It can be distinguished from Agrocybe praecox macroscopically by the absence of an annulus and of any darkening when handled.

== Habitat and distribution ==
Agrocybe putaminum is a saprobic species. Its fruitbodies grow on the ground in clusters or close groups, usually in woodchips, and so can be found in gardens, parks, and other areas that use this type of mulch. It is known to occur in western North America and Europe. The species used to be considered rare; after the initial report of its 1913 discovery in France, it was infrequently recorded again: in the Netherlands in 1958, Denmark in 1989, western Belgium and Italy in 1998, and India in 2003. The fungus has since become more common, and its range has spread along with the increasing use of woodchip mulch in ornamental flower beds. A 2007 report from central coastal California was the first North American record. It has been reported several times from Southwest Australia.
