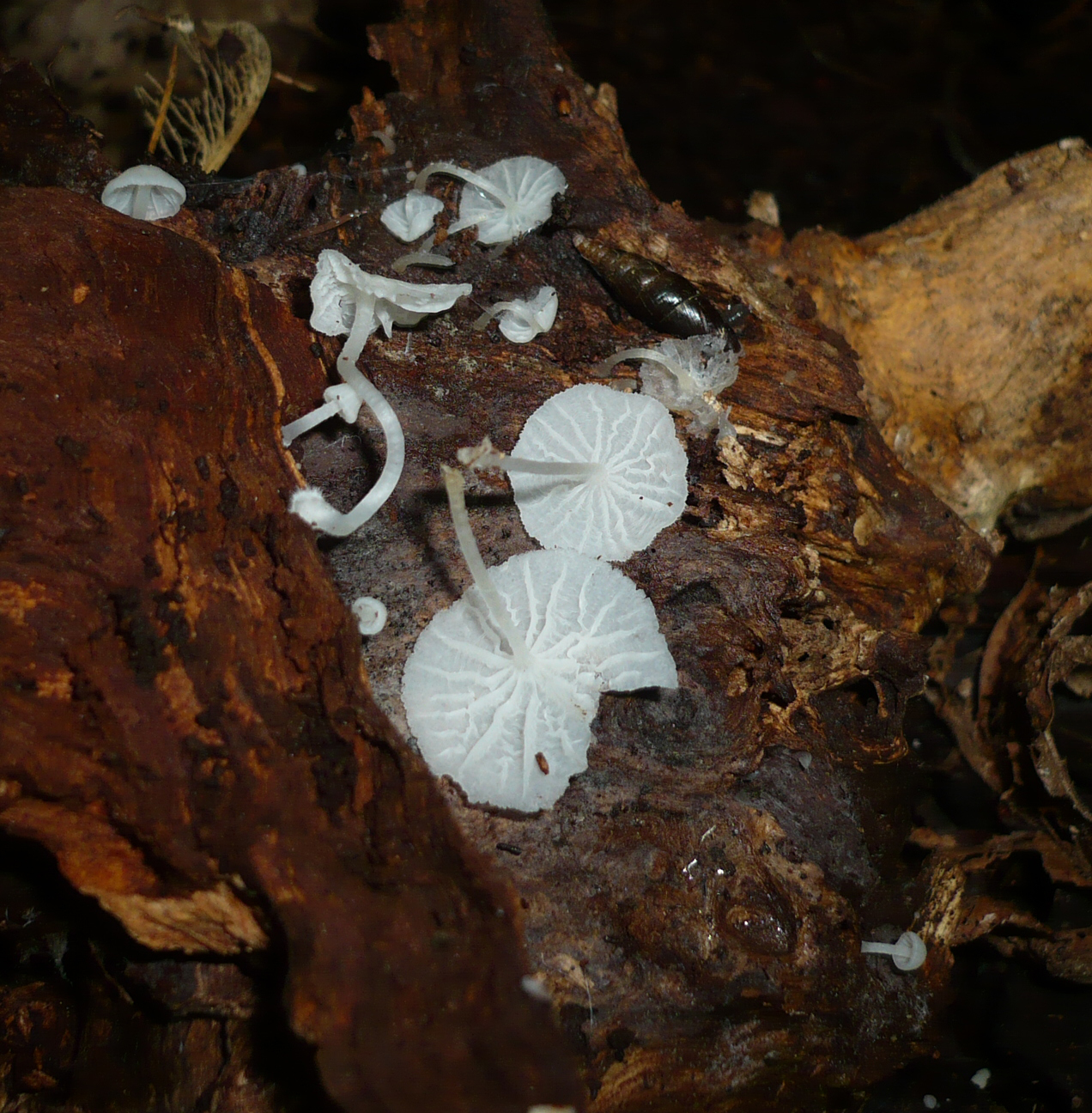
- Deliculata integrella

Scientific classification
- Kingdom: Fungi
- Division: Basidiomycota
- Class: Agaricomycetes
- Order: Agaricales
- Family: Tricholomataceae
- Genus: Delicatula; Fayod (1889)

Type species
- Omphalia integrella (Pers.) P.Kumm. (1871)

Species
- D. integrella D. persimilis

Synonyms
- Retocybe Velen. (1947)

= Delicatula =

Genus of fungi

Delicatula is a genus of fungi in the family Tricholomataceae. It was first described by Swiss mycologist Victor Fayod in 1889. The genus contains two widely distributed species.
