= Agrocybe lazoi =

Scientific classification
- Domain: Eukaryota
- Kingdom: Fungi
- Division: Basidiomycota
- Class: Agaricomycetes
- Order: Agaricales
- Family: Strophariaceae
- Genus: Agrocybe
- Species: A. lazoi

Binomial name
- Agrocybe lazoi Singer (1969)

Species of fungus

Agrocybe lazoi is a species of agaric fungus in the family Strophariaceae found in Chile. It is described as new to science by mycologist Rolf Singer in 1969.
