= Agrocybe viscosa =

Scientific classification
- Domain: Eukaryota
- Kingdom: Fungi
- Division: Basidiomycota
- Class: Agaricomycetes
- Order: Agaricales
- Family: Strophariaceae
- Genus: Agrocybe
- Species: A. viscosa

Binomial name
- Agrocybe viscosa Singer (1969)

Species of fungus

Agrocybe viscosa is a species of agaric fungus in the family Strophariaceae. Found in Chile, it was described as new to science by mycologist Rolf Singer in 1969.
