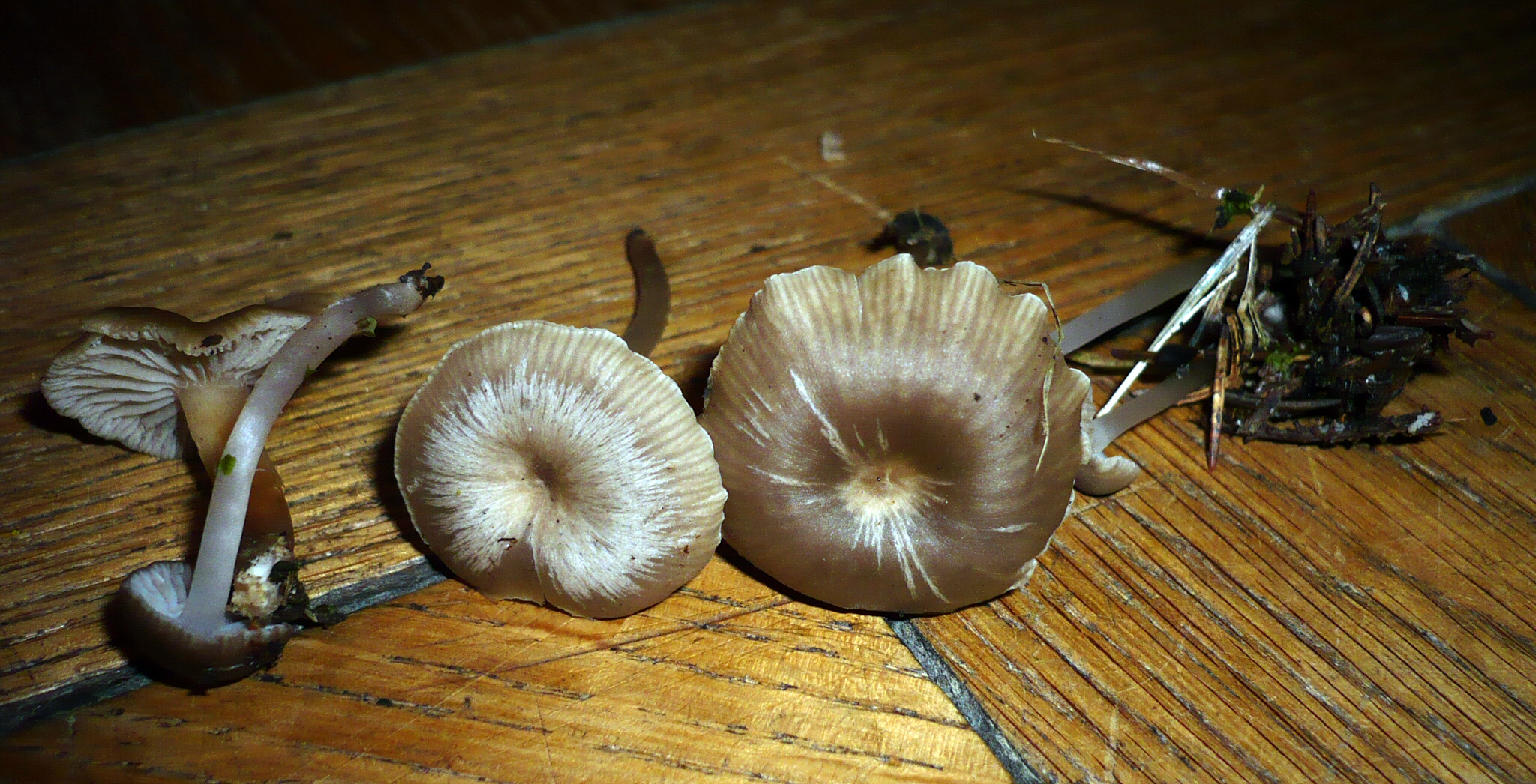

Scientific classification
- Kingdom: Fungi
- Division: Basidiomycota
- Class: Agaricomycetes
- Order: Agaricales
- Family: Tricholomataceae
- Genus: Fayodia
- Species: F. bisphaerigera

Binomial name
- Fayodia bisphaerigera (J.E.Lange) Singer

Synonyms
- 1930 Omphalia bisphaerigera J.E.Lange; 1933 Omphalia rickii Killerm. 1947 Mycena bisphaerigera (J.E.Lange) A.H.Sm.

= Fayodia bisphaerigera =

Species of fungus

Fayodia bisphaerigera is a species of fungus in the family Tricholomataceae, and the type species of the genus Fayodia. The species was originally named Omphalia bisphaerigera by Jakob Emanuel Lange, and later transferred to Fayodia in 1936 by Rolf Singer. It is found in Asia, Europe, and North America.
