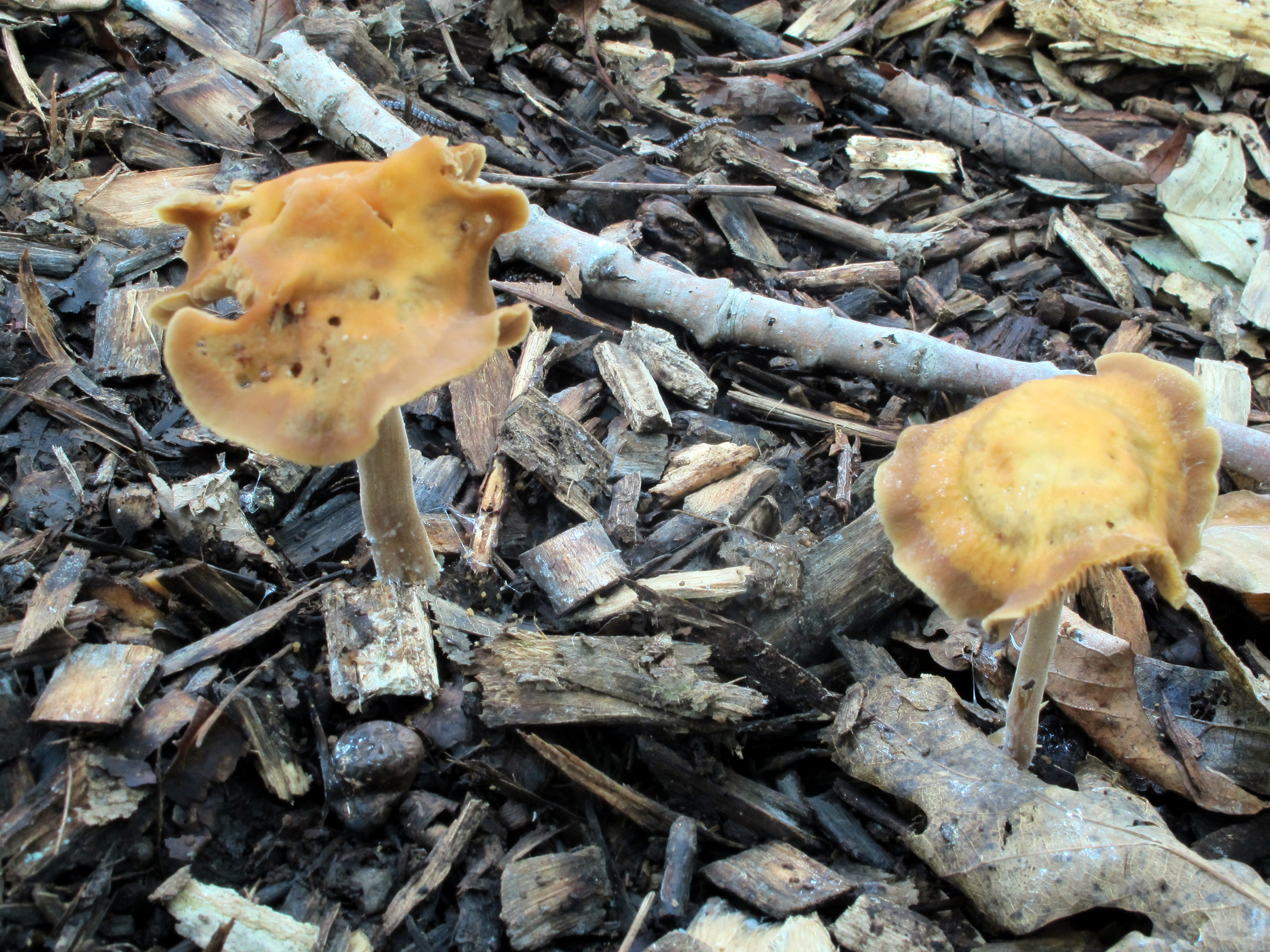
- McKeever Environmental Learning Center, Sandy Lake, Pennsylvania, USA

Scientific classification
- Kingdom: Fungi
- Division: Basidiomycota
- Class: Agaricomycetes
- Order: Agaricales
- Family: Strophariaceae
- Genus: Agrocybe
- Species: A. arvalis

Binomial name
- Agrocybe arvalis (Fr.) Singer

= Agrocybe arvalis =

Species of fungus

Agrocybe arvalis, commonly known as the digitate fieldcap or tuberous fieldcap, is a species of mushroom. It grows in garden beds and on woodchips.

== Description ==
Agrocybe arvalis has a brown, hygrophanous cap and brown spore print. It does not have an annulus. The cap is 1-3 centimeters in diameter. The gills start out yellowish buff in color, and darken in age. The stipe is 5-10 centimeters long and 2-4 millimeters wide.

This species fruits from a sclerotium.

Spores are elliptical and smooth, ranging from 9–10.5 × 5.2–6 µm. Pleurocystidia can have 3–5 apical, finger-like projections.
