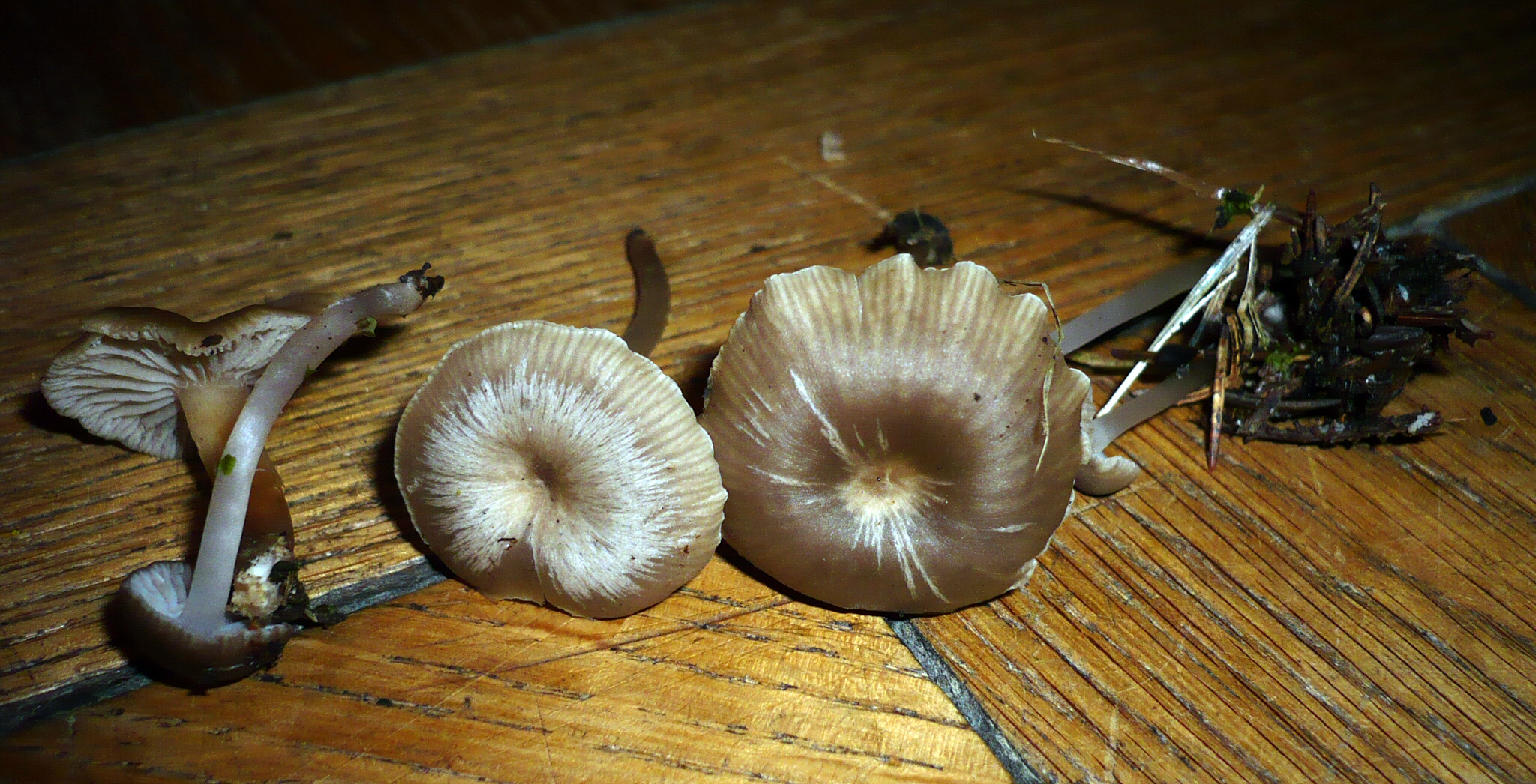
- Fayodia bisphaerigera

Scientific classification
- Kingdom: Fungi
- Division: Basidiomycota
- Class: Agaricomycetes
- Order: Agaricales
- Family: Tricholomataceae
- Genus: Fayodia; Kühner

Type species
- Fayodia bisphaerigera (J.E.Lange) Singer

Species
- F. anthracobia F. bisphaerigera F. gracilipes F. granulospora F. tenuisperma...

= Fayodia =

Genus of fungi

Fayodia is a genus of fungi in the family Tricholomataceae. It was first described by Robert Kühner in Bull. Bi-Mens. Soc. Linn. Lyon Vol.9 on page 68 in 1930, and the specific epithet honors the Swiss mycologist Victor Fayod (1860–1900). The widespread genus contains 10 species, mostly in the northern temperate regions.

== See also ==
- List of Tricholomataceae genera
