= Agrocybe acericola =

Scientific classification
- Kingdom: Fungi
- Division: Basidiomycota
- Class: Agaricomycetes
- Order: Agaricales
- Family: Strophariaceae
- Genus: Agrocybe
- Species: A. acericola

Binomial name
- Agrocybe acericola (Peck) Singer, (1950)

Species of fungus

Agrocybe allocystis is a species of agaric fungus in the family Strophariaceae.
