= Agrocybe farinacea =

Scientific classification
- Domain: Eukaryota
- Kingdom: Fungi
- Division: Basidiomycota
- Class: Agaricomycetes
- Order: Agaricales
- Family: Strophariaceae
- Genus: Agrocybe
- Species: A. farinacea

Binomial name
- Agrocybe farinacea Tsuguo Hongo

Species of fungus

Agrocybe farinacea is a species of mushroom in the family Strophariaceae. It has been reported to contain the hallucinogen psilocybin, however there has been no recent chemical analysis carried out on this mushroom, nor any modern reports of psychoactivity.
