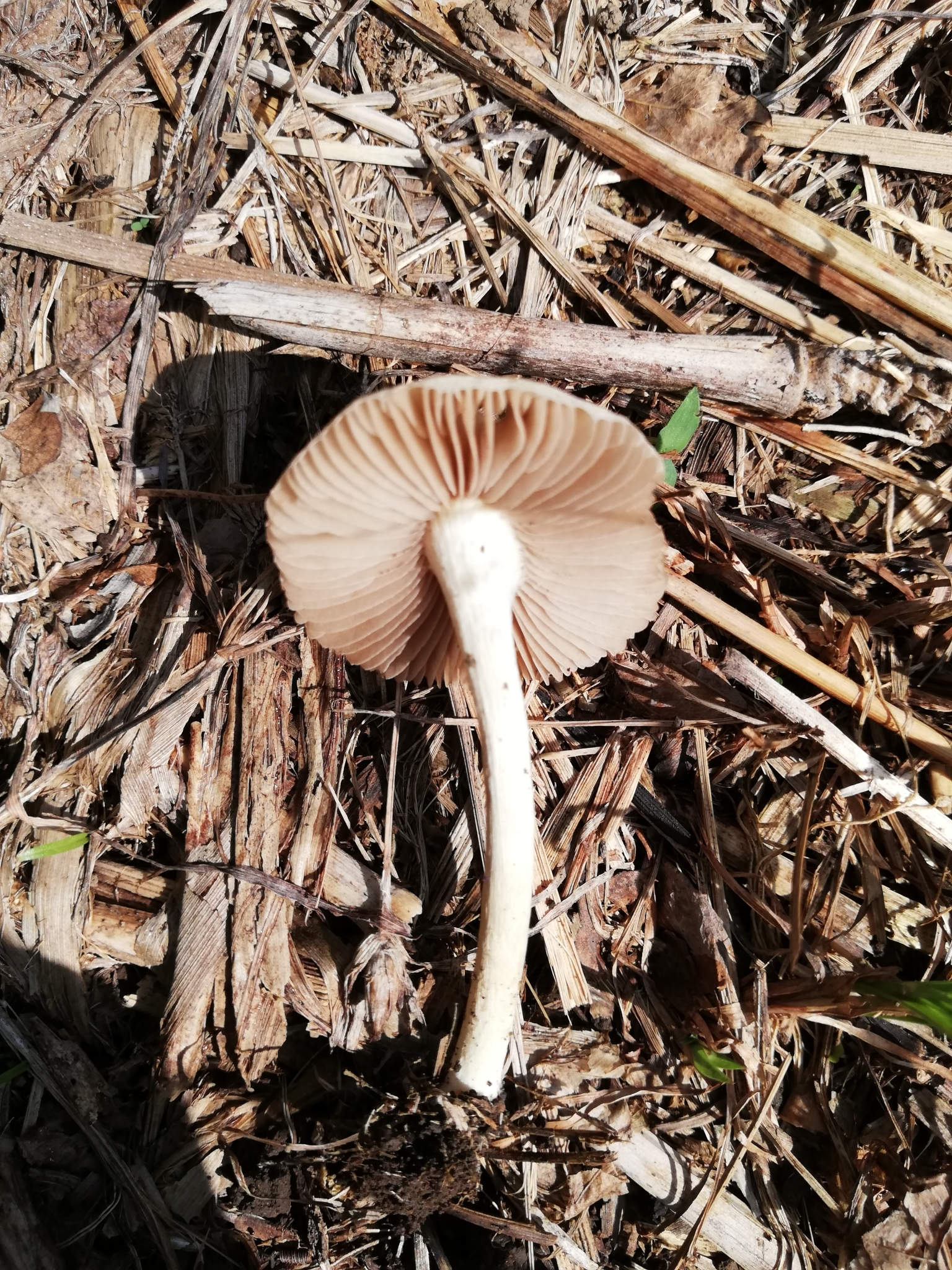

Scientific classification
- Domain: Eukaryota
- Kingdom: Fungi
- Division: Basidiomycota
- Class: Agaricomycetes
- Order: Agaricales
- Family: Strophariaceae
- Genus: Agrocybe
- Species: A. retigera

Binomial name
- Agrocybe retigera (Speg.) Singer

= Agrocybe retigera =

Species of fungus

Agrocybe retigera is a species of mushroom in the genus Agrocybe. The first known sighting of the species was in the early 1950s. It was first described by author Speggazini Singer in 1950. The mushroom has since been found in common areas, especially grassy ones, such as gardens, meadows and parks. Agrocybe retigera is most commonly found in tropical and sub-tropical areas around the globe. The size of the cap is usually between 17 and 44 millimetres, and it is generally pale in colour. The colour of the mushroom itself ranges from cream to pale-brown.
