= Agrocybe smithii =

Scientific classification
- Kingdom: Fungi
- Division: Basidiomycota
- Class: Agaricomycetes
- Order: Agaricales
- Family: Strophariaceae
- Genus: Agrocybe
- Species: A. smithii

Binomial name
- Agrocybe smithii Watling & H.E.Bigelow

Species of fungus

Agrocybe smithii is a species of mushroom in the genus Agrocybe. This species is a pileate-stipitate fungi, and has a medium size of fruitbodies. The cap is convex to plane-convex; yellowish brown. The hymenium is gilled with adnexed gills, initially whitish, but later dark brown. Odour mealy and taste bitter. The stipe is central, cylindrical and lacks a partial veil; usually has mycelial cords in the stipe base. Its spores are short, broadly ellipsoid to ovoid, smooth with a germ pore. Its pellis has large, rather inflated cheilocystidia which are more or less flask-shaped. Often found growing on wood chips.
