= Cortinarius meleagris =

Scientific classification
- Domain: Eukaryota
- Kingdom: Fungi
- Division: Basidiomycota
- Class: Agaricomycetes
- Order: Agaricales
- Family: Cortinariaceae
- Genus: Cortinarius
- Species: C. meleagris

Binomial name
- Cortinarius meleagris (E. Horak & G.M. Taylor) E. Horak, Peintner, M.M. Moser & Vilgalys

Synonyms
- Rozites meleagris E. Horak & G.M. Taylor

Species of fungus

Cortinarius meleagris, originally described as Rozites meleagris, is a species of mushroom native to New Zealand.
