= Hypholoma tuberosum =

Scientific classification
- Kingdom: Fungi
- Division: Basidiomycota
- Class: Agaricomycetes
- Order: Agaricales
- Family: Strophariaceae
- Genus: Hypholoma
- Species: H. tuberosum

Binomial name
- Hypholoma tuberosum Redhead & Kroeger

Hypholoma tuberosum
- Mycological characteristics
- Gills on hymenium
- Cap is convex or campanulate
- Hymenium is adnate
- Stipe is bare
- Spore print is purple-brown
- Ecology is saprotrophic
- Edibility is unknown

Hypholoma tuberosum is a species of mushroom in the family Strophariaceae. It is the only mushroom in the genus Hypholoma to grow from a sclerotium.

== Description ==
The cap of Hypholoma tuberosum is orangish brown, and is convex or campanulate. It is 2–6 centimeters in diameter. The stipe is about 2–4 centimeters long aboveground, and about 48 millimeters wide. The gills are adnate and start out grayish, eventually becoming purplish black. The spore print is purplish brown, and the mushroom grows from an underground sclerotium.

=== Similar species ===
Agrocybe arvalis is similar to Hypholoma tuberosum, as it also grows on woodchips and has sclerotia, but its sclerotia are more round and the mushroom is lighter in color.

== Habitat and ecology ==
Hypholoma tuberosum is saprophytic and grows on woodchips. It also grows in nutrient-rich soils, and is found in cities. It is found in China, parts of Europe, Japan, Australia, the United States, and British Colombia. In British Colombia, it is invasive, having been brought there on potted plants from Australia. It is thought to have originated in Australia.
