= Victor Fayod =

Swiss mycologist (1860–1900)

Victor Fayod (23 November 1860 – 28 April 1900) was a Swiss mycologist who created an influential novel classification of the agaric fungi and described a number of new genera and species.

== Biographical overview ==
Fayod was born on 23 November 1860 in Salaz, a small locality close to the municipality of Bex in the Swiss canton of Vaud. He was a grandson of a famous Swiss geologist, Johann von Charpentier. After attending school in Bex and Lausanne, he studied mathematics and later silviculture at the polytechnic institute ETH Zurich. He was strongly interested in botany and mycology, but his work in those areas had to be conducted in a private capacity.

Fayod worked with German botanist Heinrich Anton de Bary in Strasbourg from 1881 to 1882. He then worked as a tutor. He worked in a series of biology-related jobs in Bad Cannstatt, Normandy, Nervi, the Valli Valdesi (a region of the Cottian Alps), and Genoa. He also assisted French bacteriologist André Chantemesse in Paris. After working in a dental laboratory in Paris in 1890, he decided to take on dentistry as a less precarious, alternative career and became qualified as a dental surgeon at the Paris Faculty of Medicine. However, health problems soon caused him to return to Switzerland and his illness continued until his death on 28 April 1900.

== Scientific achievements ==
Fayod learned French, German, and Italian and published scientific papers in all three languages. A bibliography of his work can be found in the reference authored by the Swiss Academy of Natural Science.

He recognized the influence of Darwinism on botany and devised a new classification of gilled fungi, based for the first time on microscopic features such as basidia, cystidia, and spores. He presented this classification in his most important work, Prodrome d'une histoire naturelle des agaricinées (Prodrome of a Natural History of the Agarics), in which he proposed some new generic designations which are still in use today: Agrocybe, Cystoderma, Delicatula, Omphalotus, Pholiotina, and Schinzinia. These genera, which bear his name as originating author, are the main reason that Fayod is still remembered. Some of them are well-known, containing common species, whilst others are less so. He also proposed many other new genus names which are no longer in use.

Fayod's work focused primarily on the Hymenomycetes. One major outcome of his research was his description of spore discharge in the basidiomycetes, which involves the formation of a drop of liquid. He left a collection of biological illustrations and other items which are preserved in the Conservatoire and Botanical Gardens of Geneva.

The genus Fayodia (of fungi in the family Tricholomataceae), was named in his honour in 1930, as was the species Pluteus fayodii (which may be identical to the similar species Pluteus leoninus).
