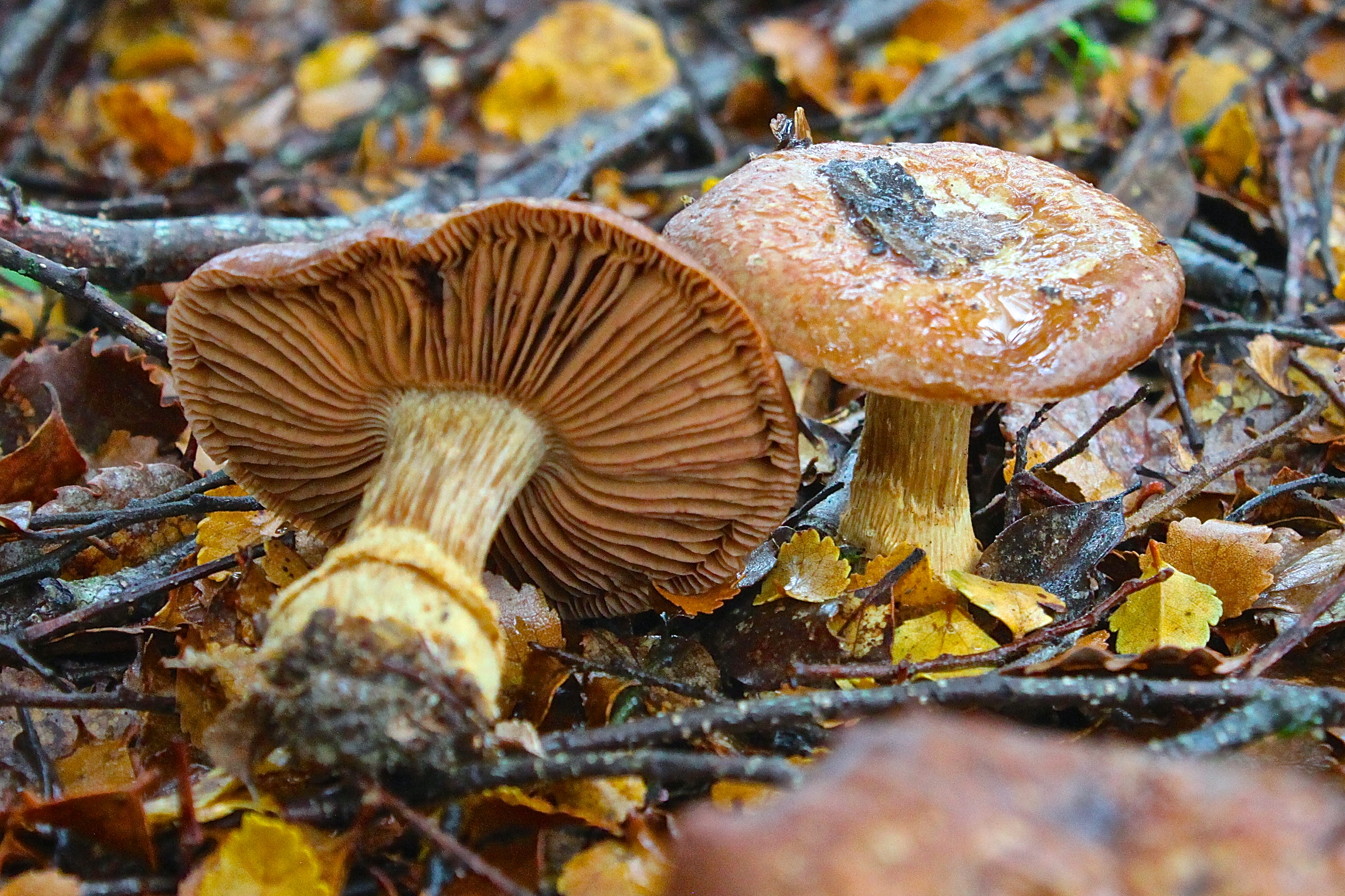

Scientific classification
- Domain: Eukaryota
- Kingdom: Fungi
- Division: Basidiomycota
- Class: Agaricomycetes
- Order: Agaricales
- Family: Cortinariaceae
- Genus: Cortinarius
- Species: C. subcastanellus

Binomial name
- Cortinarius subcastanellus (E.Horak & G.M.Taylor) E.Horak, Peintner, M.M.Moser & Vilgalys (2002)

Synonyms
- Rozites castanella E.Horak & G.M.Taylor (1982)

= Cortinarius subcastanellus =

Species of fungus

Cortinarius subcastanellus is a species of mushroom native to New Zealand. It was originally described in 1982 as Rozites castanella by mycologists Egon Horak and Grace Marie Taylor.
