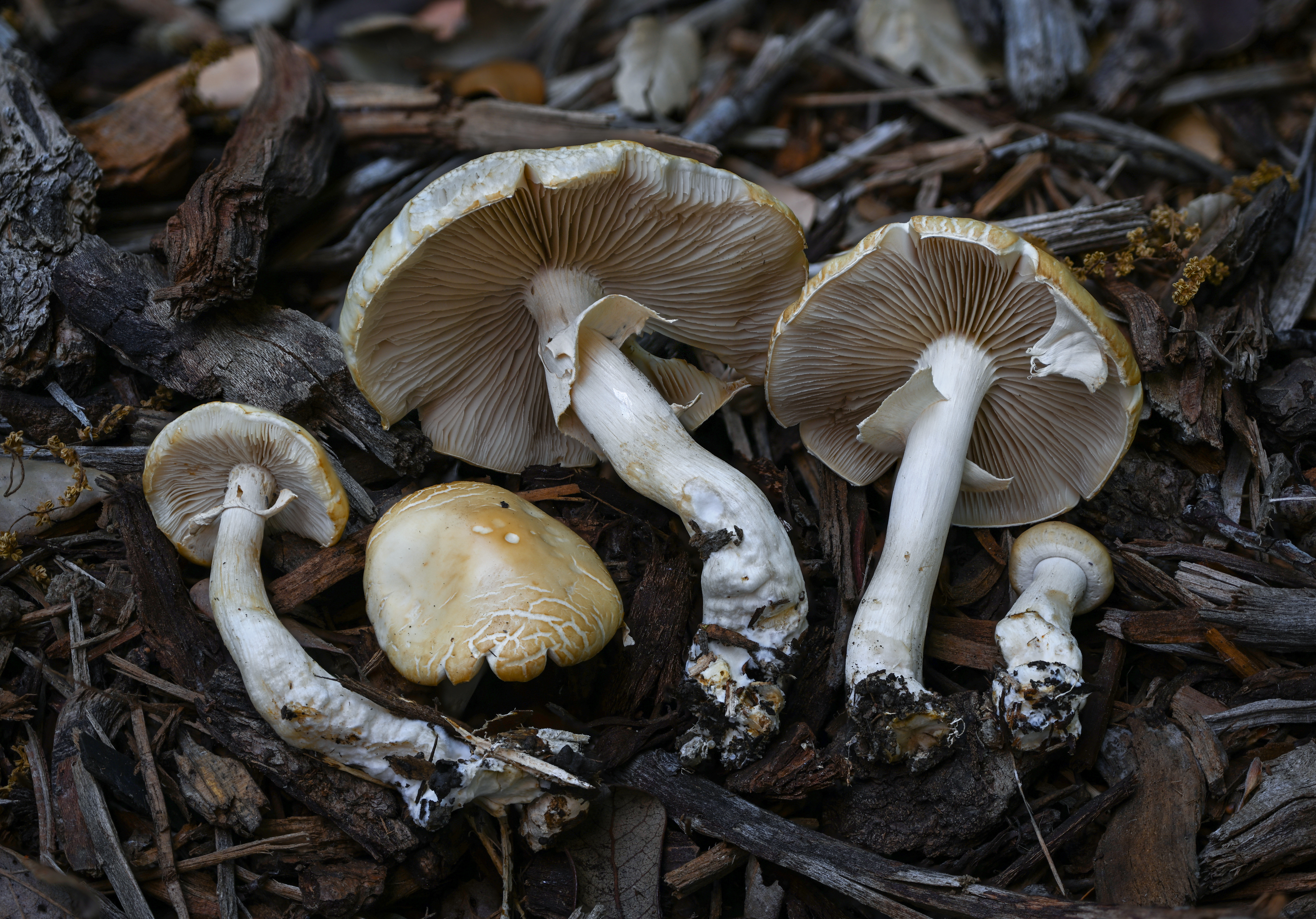
- Agrocybe praecox

Scientific classification
- Domain: Eukaryota
- Kingdom: Fungi
- Division: Basidiomycota
- Class: Agaricomycetes
- Order: Agaricales
- Family: Strophariaceae
- Genus: Agrocybe; Fayod.

Type species
- Agrocybe praecox (Pers.) Fayod

= Agrocybe =

Genus of fungi

Agrocybe is a genus of mushrooms in the family Strophariaceae (previously placed in the Bolbitiaceae). The genus has a widespread distribution, and contains about 100 species.

== Distribution ==
Agrocybe is a common and cosmopolitan genus; species have been recorded in temperate and tropical regions on every inhabited continent, and they are presumed to occur in every country.

== Uses ==
Mushroom cultivation began with the Romans and Greeks, who grew the small Agrocybe aegerita. The Romans believed that fungi fruited when lightning struck.

Agrocybe aegerita is commonly known as the poplar mushroom, chestnut mushroom or velvet pioppino (Chinese: 茶樹菇). It is a white rot fungus. It is cultivated and sold in Japan, Korea, Australia and China. It is an important valuable source of bioactive secondary metabolites such as indole derivatives with free radical scavenging activity, cylindan with anticancer activity, and also agrocybenine with antifungal activity.

Agrocybe farinacea of Japan, a species closely related to Agrocybe putaminum, has been reported to contain the hallucinogen psilocybin; however, there has been no recent chemical analysis carried out on this mushroom, nor any modern reports of psychoactivity.

== Selected list of species ==
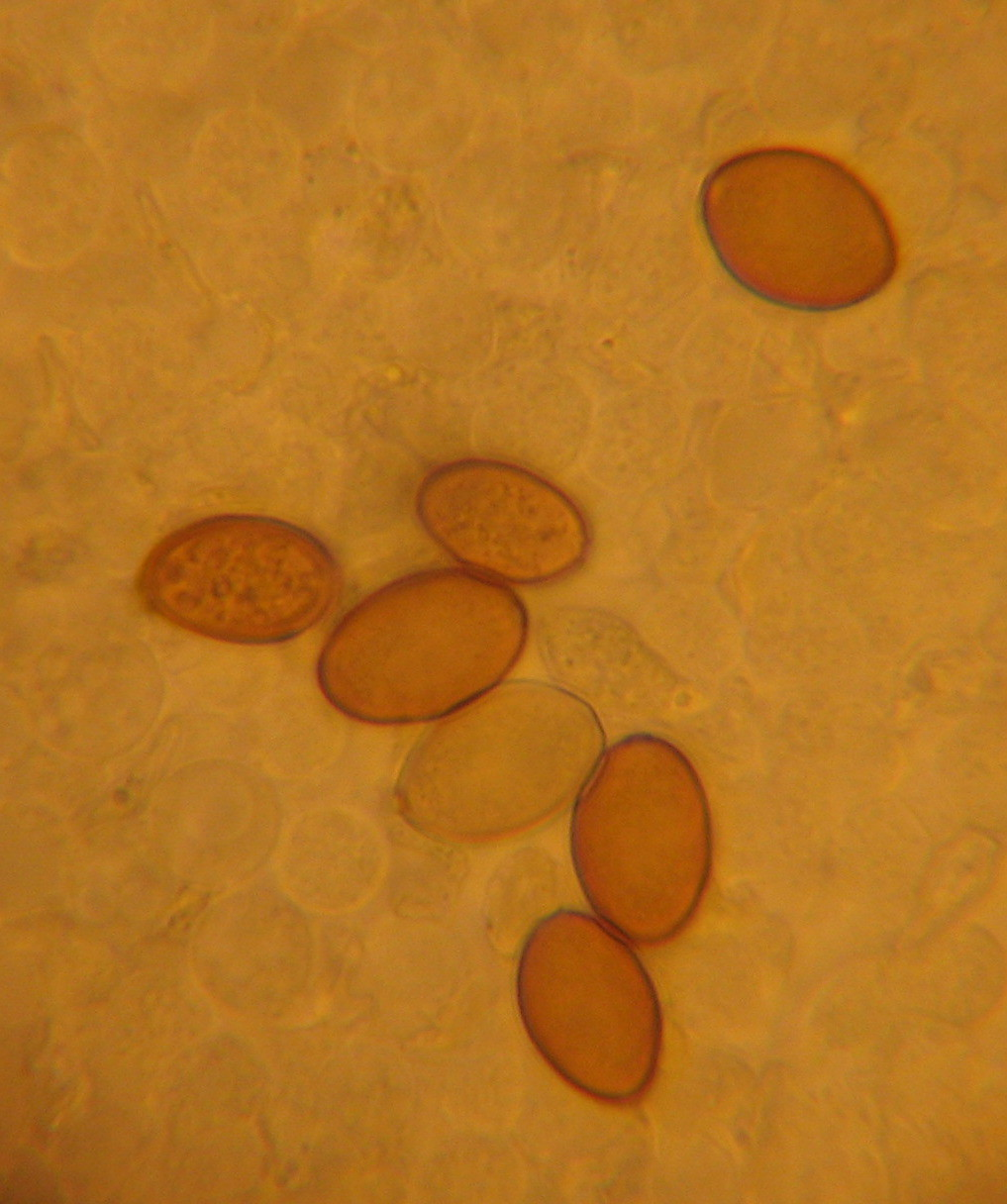
Agrocybe pediades spores

- Agrocybe acericola (maple agrocybe)
- Agrocybe aegerita
- Agrocybe allocystis
- Agrocybe amara
- Agrocybe arvalis
- Agrocybe dura (edible)
- Agrocybe erebia
- Agrocybe farinacea (possibly contains psilocybin)
- Agrocybe firma
- Agrocybe lazoi
- Agrocybe ludoviciana
- Agrocybe molesta
- Agrocybe paludosa
- Agrocybe pediades (common lawn mushroom)
- Agrocybe praecox (common and widespread)
- Agrocybe procera
- Agrocybe putaminum
- Agrocybe retigera
- Agrocybe rivulosa
- Agrocybe semiorbicularis
- Agrocybe sororia
- Agrocybe vervacti
- Agrocybe viscosa

== See also ==
- List of psilocybin mushrooms
- Psilocybin mushroom
