= List of Stiphidiidae species =

This page lists all described species of the spider family Stiphidiidae accepted by the World Spider Catalog as of February 2021:

== A ==
=== Aorangia ===
Aorangia Forster & Wilton, 1973

- A. agama Forster & Wilton, 1973 — New Zealand
- A. ansa Forster & Wilton, 1973 (type) — New Zealand
- A. fiordensis Forster & Wilton, 1973 — New Zealand
- A. isolata Forster & Wilton, 1973 — New Zealand
- A. kapitiensis Forster & Wilton, 1973 — New Zealand
- A. mauii Forster & Wilton, 1973 — New Zealand
- A. muscicola Forster & Wilton, 1973 — New Zealand
- A. obscura Forster & Wilton, 1973 — New Zealand
- A. otira Forster & Wilton, 1973 — New Zealand
- A. pilgrimi Forster & Wilton, 1973 — New Zealand
- A. poppelwelli Forster & Wilton, 1973 — New Zealand
- A. pudica Forster & Wilton, 1973 — New Zealand
- A. semita Forster & Wilton, 1973 — New Zealand
- A. silvestris Forster & Wilton, 1973 — New Zealand
- A. singularis Forster & Wilton, 1973 — New Zealand
- A. tumida Forster & Wilton, 1973 — New Zealand

=== Asmea ===
Asmea Gray & Smith, 2008

- A. akrikensis Gray & Smith, 2008 (type) — New Guinea
- A. capella Gray & Smith, 2008 — New Guinea
- A. hayllari Gray & Smith, 2008 — New Guinea
- A. mullerensis Gray & Smith, 2008 — New Guinea

== B ==
=== Borrala ===
Borrala Gray & Smith, 2004

- B. dorrigo Gray & Smith, 2004 (type) — Australia (New South Wales)
- B. longipalpis Gray & Smith, 2004 — Australia (New South Wales)
- B. webbi Gray & Smith, 2004 — Australia (New South Wales)
- B. yabbra Gray & Smith, 2004 — Australia (New South Wales)

== C ==
=== Carbinea ===
Carbinea Davies, 1999

- C. breviscapa Davies, 1999 — Australia (Queensland)
- C. longiscapa Davies, 1999 (type) — Australia (Queensland)
- C. robertsi Davies, 1999 — Australia (Queensland)
- C. wunderlichi Davies, 1999 — Australia (Queensland)

=== Couranga ===
Couranga Gray & Smith, 2008

- C. diehappy Gray & Smith, 2008 — Australia (Queensland, New South Wales)
- C. kioloa Gray & Smith, 2008 (type) — Australia (Queensland, New South Wales)

== E ==
=== Elleguna ===
Elleguna Gray & Smith, 2008

- E. major Gray & Smith, 2008 (type) — Australia (Queensland)
- E. minor Gray & Smith, 2008 — Australia (Queensland)

== J ==
=== Jamberoo ===
Jamberoo Gray & Smith, 2008

- J. actensis Gray & Smith, 2008 — Australian Capital Territory
- J. australis Gray & Smith, 2008 — Australia (Victoria)
- J. boydensis Gray & Smith, 2008 — Australia (New South Wales)
- J. johnnoblei Gray & Smith, 2008 (type) — Australia (New South Wales)

== K ==
=== Kababina ===
Kababina Davies, 1995

- K. alta Davies, 1995 (type) — Australia (Queensland)
- K. aquilonia Davies, 1995 — Australia (Queensland)
- K. colemani Davies, 1995 — Australia (Queensland)
- K. covacevichae Davies, 1995 — Australia (Queensland)
- K. formartine Davies, 1995 — Australia (Queensland)
- K. inferna Davies, 1995 — Australia (Queensland)
- K. isley Davies, 1995 — Australia (Queensland)
- K. superna Davies, 1995 — Australia (Queensland)
- K. yungaburra Davies, 1995 — Australia (Queensland)

=== Karriella ===
Karriella Gray & Smith, 2008

- K. treenensis Gray & Smith, 2008 (type) — Australia (Western Australia)
- K. walpolensis Gray & Smith, 2008 — Australia (Western Australia)

== M ==
=== Malarina ===
Malarina Davies & Lambkin, 2000

- M. cardwell Davies & Lambkin, 2000 — Australia (Queensland)
- M. collina Davies & Lambkin, 2000 — Australia (Queensland)
- M. masseyensis Davies & Lambkin, 2000 — Australia (Queensland)
- M. monteithi Davies & Lambkin, 2000 (type) — Australia (Queensland)

=== Marplesia ===
Marplesia Lehtinen, 1967

- M. dugdalei Forster & Wilton, 1973 (type) — New Zealand
- M. pohara Forster & Wilton, 1973 — New Zealand

== N ==
=== Neolana ===
Neolana Forster & Wilton, 1973

- N. dalmasi (Marples, 1959) (type) — New Zealand
- N. pallida Forster & Wilton, 1973 — New Zealand
- N. septentrionalis Forster & Wilton, 1973 — New Zealand

=== Neoramia ===
Neoramia Forster & Wilton, 1973

- N. allanae Forster & Wilton, 1973 — New Zealand
- N. alta Forster & Wilton, 1973 — New Zealand
- N. charybdis (Hogg, 1910) (type) — New Zealand
- N. childi Forster & Wilton, 1973 — New Zealand
- N. crucifera (Hogg, 1909) — New Zealand (Auckland Is.)
- N. finschi (L. Koch, 1872) — New Zealand
- N. fiordensis Forster & Wilton, 1973 — New Zealand
- N. hoggi (Forster, 1964) — New Zealand (Campbell Is.)
- N. hokina Forster & Wilton, 1973 — New Zealand
- N. janus (Bryant, 1935) — New Zealand
- N. koha Forster & Wilton, 1973 — New Zealand
- N. komata Forster & Wilton, 1973 — New Zealand
- N. mamoea Forster & Wilton, 1973 — New Zealand
- N. marama Forster & Wilton, 1973 — New Zealand
- N. margaretae Forster & Wilton, 1973 — New Zealand
- N. matua Forster & Wilton, 1973 — New Zealand
- N. minuta Forster & Wilton, 1973 — New Zealand
- N. nana Forster & Wilton, 1973 — New Zealand
- N. oroua Forster & Wilton, 1973 — New Zealand
- N. otagoa Forster & Wilton, 1973 — New Zealand
- N. raua Forster & Wilton, 1973 — New Zealand
- N. setosa (Bryant, 1935) — New Zealand

== P ==
=== Pillara ===
Pillara Gray & Smith, 2004

- P. coolahensis Gray & Smith, 2004 — Australia (New South Wales)
- P. griswoldi Gray & Smith, 2004 — Australia (New South Wales)
- P. karuah Gray & Smith, 2004 (type) — Australia (New South Wales)
- P. macleayensis Gray & Smith, 2004 — Australia (New South Wales)

=== Procambridgea ===
Procambridgea Forster & Wilton, 1973

- P. carrai Davies, 2001 — Australia (New South Wales)
- P. cavernicola Forster & Wilton, 1973 — Australia (New South Wales)
- P. grayi Davies, 2001 — Australia (New South Wales). Introduced to New Zealand
- P. hilleri Davies, 2001 — Australia (Queensland)
- P. hunti Davies, 2001 — Australia (New South Wales)
- P. kioloa Davies, 2001 — Australia (New South Wales)
- P. lamington Davies, 2001 — Australia (Queensland)
- P. montana Davies, 2001 — Australia (Queensland, New South Wales)
- P. monteithi Davies, 2001 — Australia (New South Wales)
- P. otwayensis Davies, 2001 — Australia (Victoria)
- P. ourimbah Davies, 2001 — Australia (New South Wales)
- P. rainbowi Forster & Wilton, 1973 (type) — Australia (New South Wales)

== S ==
=== Stiphidion ===
Stiphidion

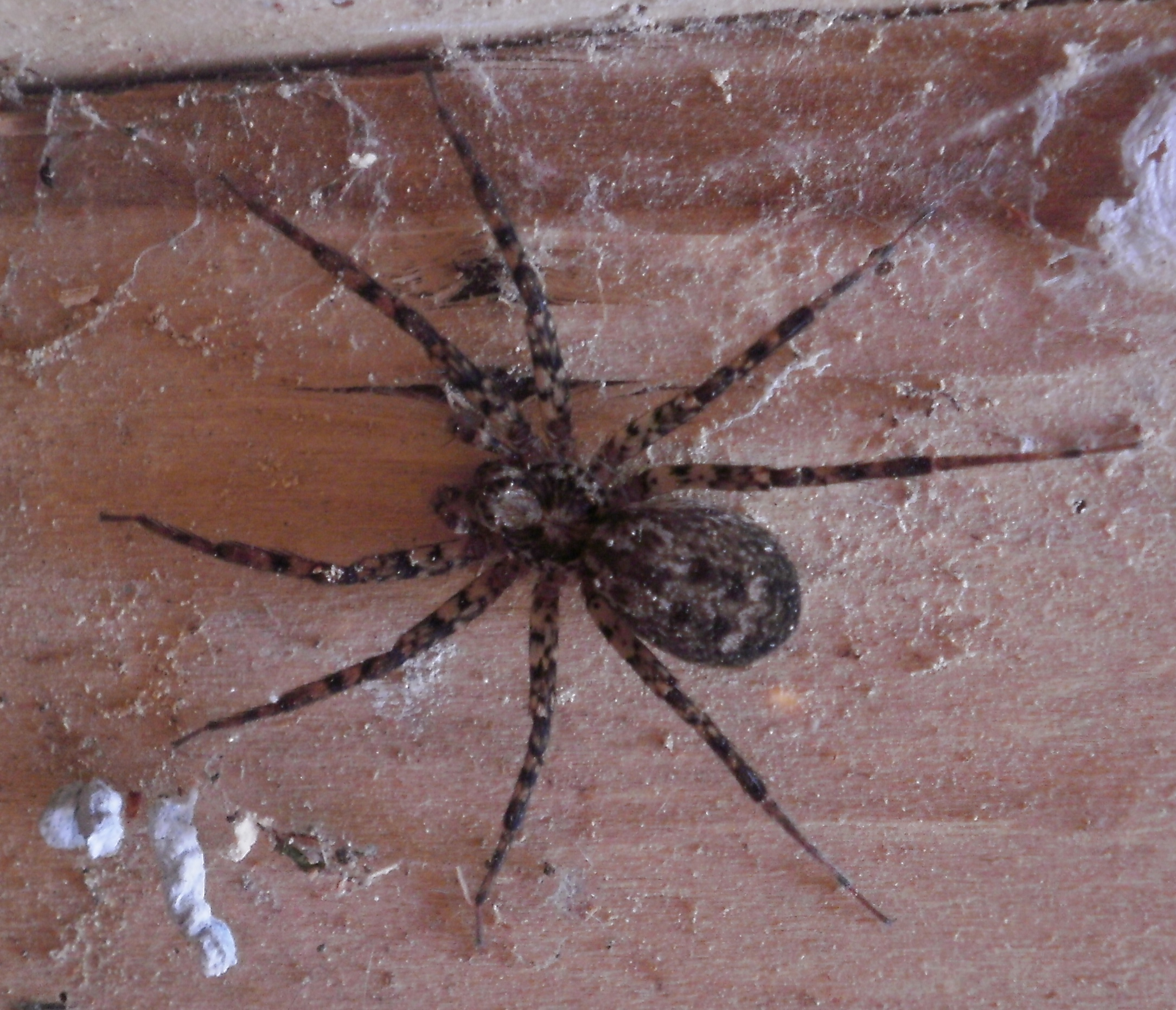
Stiphidion facetum

Stiphidion Simon, 1902

- S. adornatum Davies, 1988 — Australia (Queensland)
- S. diminutum Davies, 1988 — Australia (Queensland)
- S. facetum Simon, 1902 (type) — Australia. Introduced to New Zealand
- S. raveni Davies, 1988 — Australia (New South Wales)

== T ==
=== Tartarus ===
Tartarus

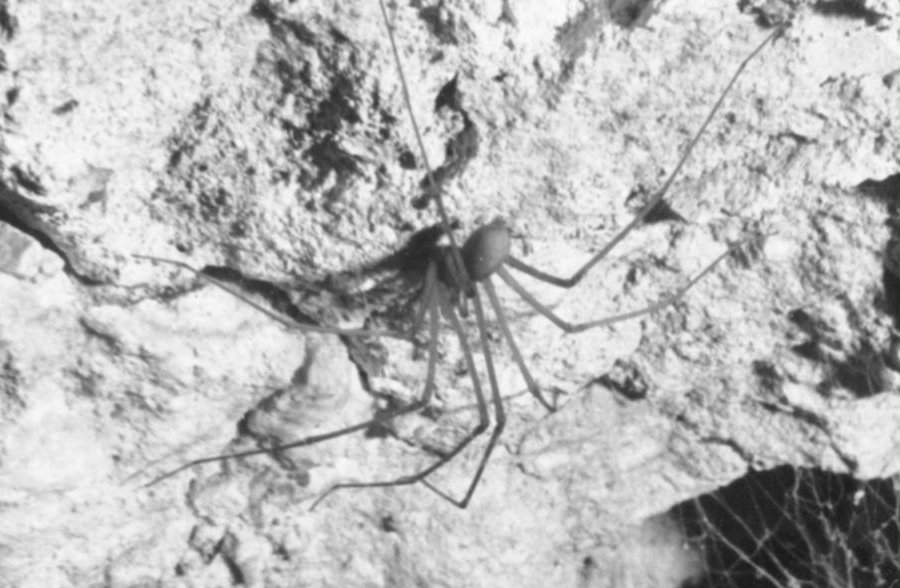
Mullamullang cave spider
(Tartarus mullamullangensis)

Tartarus Gray, 1973

- T. mullamullangensis Gray, 1973 (type) — Australia (Western Australia)
- T. murdochensis Gray, 1992 — Australia (Western Australia)
- T. nurinensis Gray, 1992 — Australia (Western Australia)
- T. thampannensis Gray, 1992 — Australia (Western Australia)

=== Therlinya ===
Therlinya Gray & Smith, 2002

- T. angusta Gray & Smith, 2002 — Australia (Queensland)
- T. ballata Gray & Smith, 2002 — Australia (New South Wales)
- T. bellinger Gray & Smith, 2002 — Australia (New South Wales)
- T. foveolata Gray & Smith, 2002 — Australia (Victoria)
- T. horsemanae Gray & Smith, 2002 — Australia (Queensland)
- T. kiah Gray & Smith, 2002 (type) — Australia (New South Wales, Victoria)
- T. lambkinae Gray & Smith, 2002 — Australia (Queensland)
- T. monteithi Gray & Smith, 2002 — Australia (Queensland)
- T. nasuta Gray & Smith, 2002 — Australia (Queensland)
- T. vexillum Gray & Smith, 2002 — Australia (Queensland)
- T. wiangaree Gray & Smith, 2002 — Australia (Queensland, New South Wales)

=== Tjurunga ===
Tjurunga Lehtinen, 1967

- T. paroculus (Simon, 1903) (type) — Australia (Tasmania)

== W ==
=== Wabua ===
Wabua Davies, 2000

- W. aberdeen Davies, 2000 — Australia (Queensland)
- W. cleveland Davies, 2000 — Australia (Queensland)
- W. crediton Davies, 2000 — Australia (Queensland)
- W. elliot Davies, 2000 — Australia (Queensland)
- W. eungella Davies, 2000 — Australia (Queensland)
- W. halifax Davies, 2000 — Australia (Queensland)
- W. hypipamee Davies, 2000 — Australia (Queensland)
- W. kirrama Davies, 2000 — Australia (Queensland)
- W. major Davies, 2000 (type) — Australia (Queensland)
- W. paluma Davies, 2000 — Australia (Queensland)
- W. seaview Davies, 2000 — Australia (Queensland)
