= A. pudica =

A. pudica may refer to:

- Alstroemeria pudica, a plant species in the genus Alstroemeria
- Aorangia pudica, a spider species in the genus Aorangia

== See also ==
- Pudica
