= Tjurunga (disambiguation) =

Tjurunga, also spelt Churinga, is an object considered to be of religious significance by Central Australian Aboriginal peoples of the Arrernte groups.

Churinga or Tjurunga may also refer to:

- Agylla (moth), a genus of moth formerly known as Churinga
- Churinga (journal), the official journal of the Aborigines Progressive Association from 1964 to 1970
- Tjurunga paroculus, a species of spider
