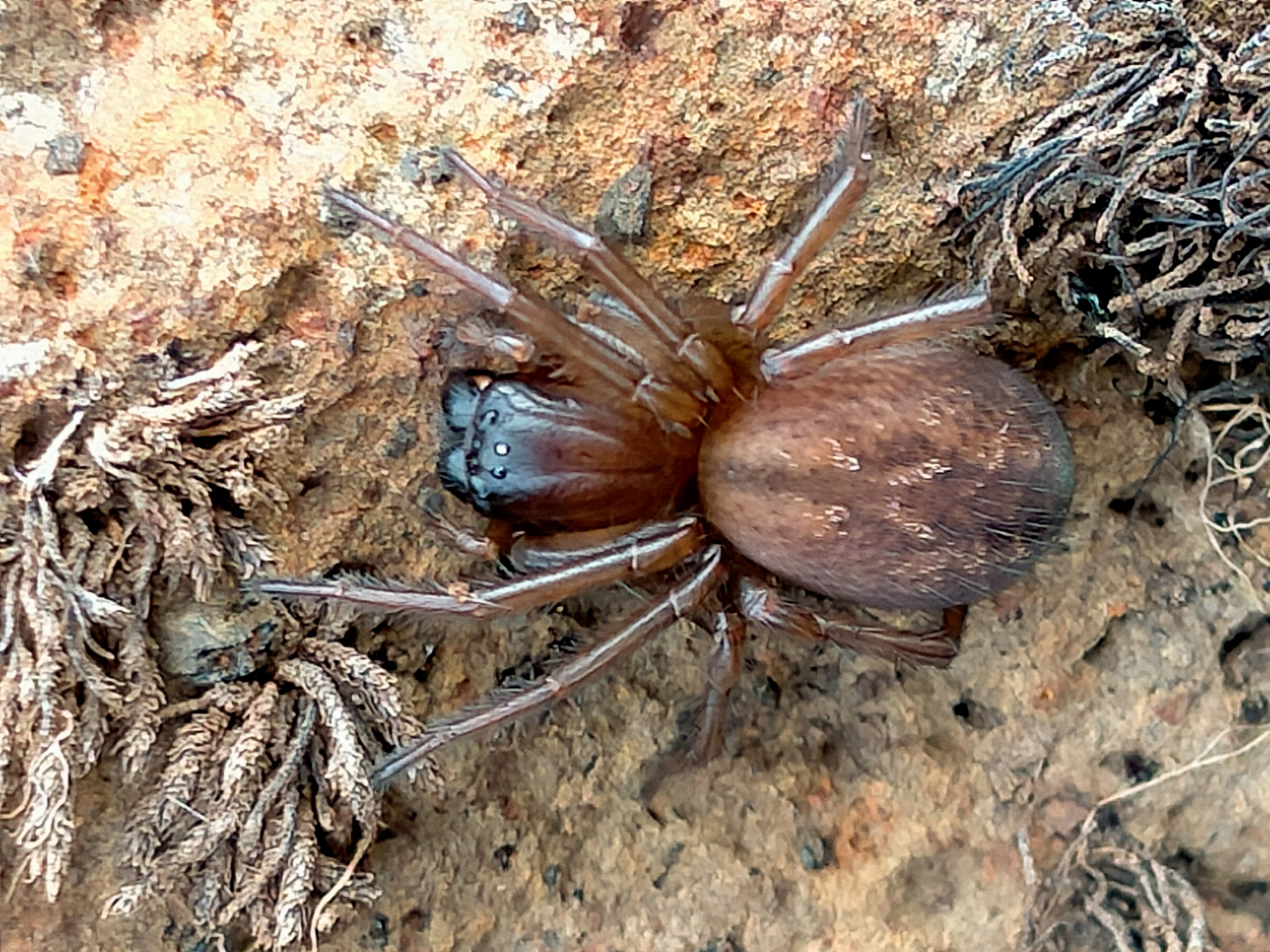

Conservation status
- Naturally Uncommon (NZ TCS)

Scientific classification
- Kingdom: Animalia
- Phylum: Arthropoda
- Subphylum: Chelicerata
- Class: Arachnida
- Order: Araneae
- Infraorder: Araneomorphae
- Family: Stiphidiidae
- Genus: Neoramia
- Species: N. crucifera

Binomial name
- Neoramia crucifera (Hogg, 1909)

Synonyms
- Rubrius cruciferus; Oramia rubrioides; Oramia crucifera

= Neoramia crucifera =

Species of spider

Neoramia crucifera is a species of Stiphidiidae that is endemic to New Zealand.

== Taxonomy ==
This species was first described as Rubrius cruciferus in 1909 by Henry Roughton Hogg from female and male specimens. It was most recently revised in 1973, in which it was moved to the Neoramia genus. The type specimens are stored in Canterbury Museum.

== Description ==
The female is recorded at 11.6mm in length whereas the male is 8.4mm. The cephalothorax is coloured reddish brown and is darker anteriorly. The legs are pale yellow. The abdomen is greyish brown with pale markings dorsally. This colouration is identical to that of Neoramia hoggi.

== Distribution ==
This species is only known from the Auckland Islands in New Zealand.

== Conservation status ==
Under the New Zealand Threat Classification System, this species is listed as "Naturally Uncommon" with the qualifiers of "Island Endemic" and "One Location".
