= Neoramia margaretae =

Conservation status
- Naturally Uncommon (NZ TCS)

Scientific classification
- Kingdom: Animalia
- Phylum: Arthropoda
- Subphylum: Chelicerata
- Class: Arachnida
- Order: Araneae
- Infraorder: Araneomorphae
- Family: Stiphidiidae
- Genus: Neoramia
- Species: N. margaretae

Binomial name
- Neoramia margaretae Forster & Wilton, 1973

Species of spider

Neoramia margaretae is a species of Stiphidiidae that is endemic to New Zealand.

== Taxonomy ==
This species was described in 1973 by Ray Forster and Cecil Wilton from male and female specimens. The holotype is stored in Otago Museum.

== Description ==
The male is recorded at 4.4mm in length whereas the female is 10mm. The cephalothorax is coloured pale yellowish orange and is darker anteriorly. The legs have dark bands. The abdomen is dark with a pattern dorsally.

== Distribution ==
This species is only known from Open Bay Island in Westland, New Zealand.

== Conservation status ==
Under the New Zealand Threat Classification System, this species is listed as "Naturally Uncommon" with the qualifiers of "Island Endemic" and "One Location".
