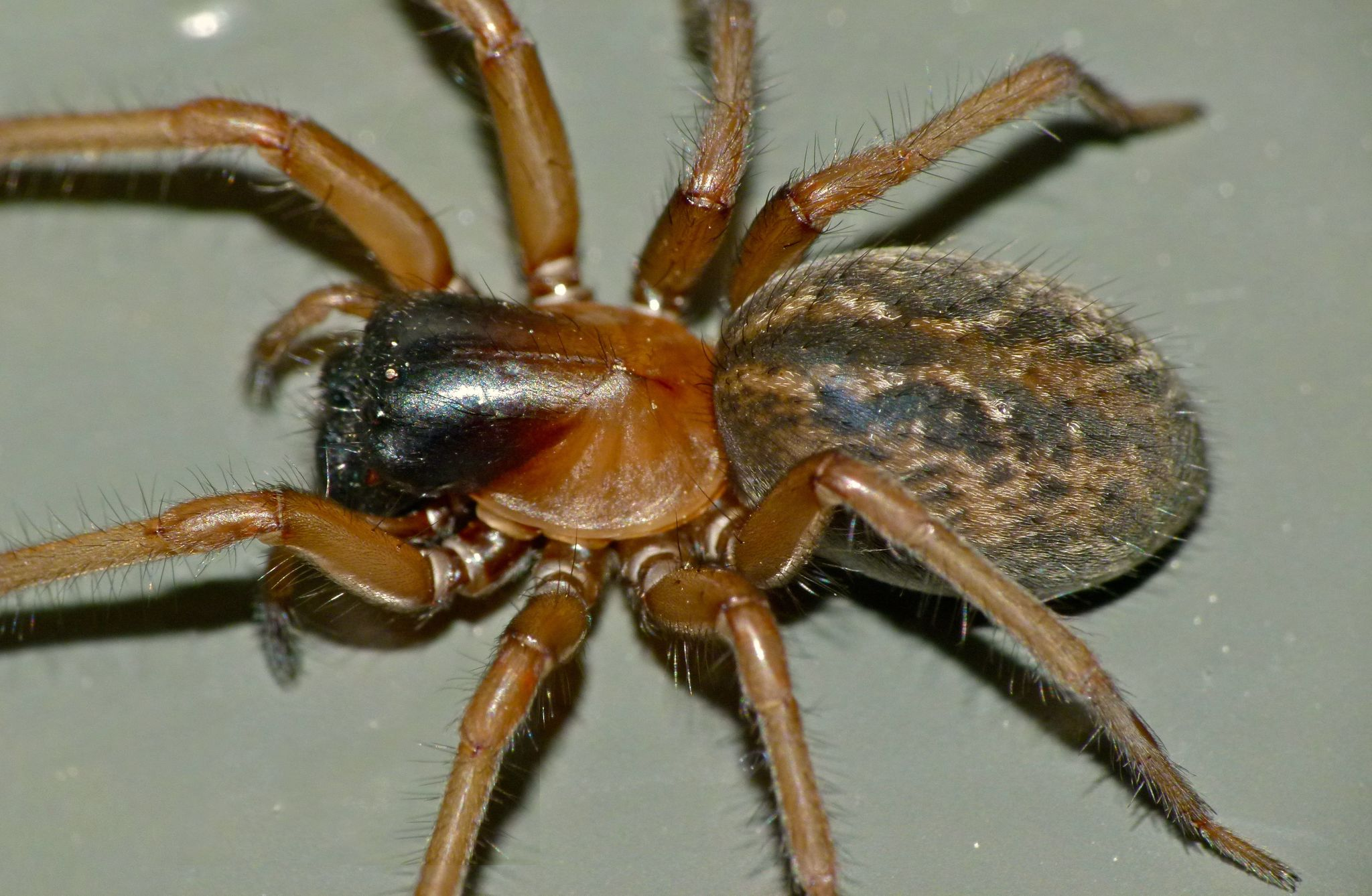

Conservation status
- Naturally Uncommon (NZ TCS)

Scientific classification
- Kingdom: Animalia
- Phylum: Arthropoda
- Subphylum: Chelicerata
- Class: Arachnida
- Order: Araneae
- Infraorder: Araneomorphae
- Family: Stiphidiidae
- Genus: Neoramia
- Species: N. alta

Binomial name
- Neoramia alta Forster & Wilton, 1973

= Neoramia alta =

Species of spider

Neoramia alta is a species of spider in the family Stiphidiidae. It is endemic to New Zealand.

== Taxonomy ==
This species was described in 1973 by Ray Forster and Cecil Wilton from male and female specimens. The holotype is stored in Otago Museum.

== Description ==
The male is recorded at 7.8mm in length whereas the female is 9.9mm. The carapace is coloured cream with brown shading and darkens anteriorly. The legs are pale. The abdomen is dark with brownish flecks.

== Distribution ==
This species is only recorded from Central Otago, New Zealand.

== Conservation status ==
Under the New Zealand Threat Classification System, this species is listed as "Naturally Uncommon" with the qualifiers of "Data Poor: Size" and "Data Poor: Trend".
