= Neoramia otagoa =

Conservation status
- Naturally Uncommon (NZ TCS)

Scientific classification
- Kingdom: Animalia
- Phylum: Arthropoda
- Subphylum: Chelicerata
- Class: Arachnida
- Order: Araneae
- Infraorder: Araneomorphae
- Family: Stiphidiidae
- Genus: Neoramia
- Species: N. otagoa

Binomial name
- Neoramia otagoa Forster & Wilton, 1973

Species of spider

Neoramia otagoa is a species of Stiphidiidae that is endemic to New Zealand.

== Taxonomy ==
This species was described in 1973 by Ray Forster and Cecil Wilton from male and female specimens. The holotype is stored in Otago Museum.

== Description ==
The female is recorded at 14.3mm in length whereas the male is 11.7mm. The cephalothorax is coloured yellowish orange and darkens anteriorly. The legs are yellowish orange with dark bands. The abdomen is patterned dorsally.

== Distribution ==
This species is only known from Otago, New Zealand.

== Conservation status ==
Under the New Zealand Threat Classification System, this species is listed as "Naturally Uncommon" with the qualifier of "Range Restricted".
