= Neoramia nana =

Conservation status
- Naturally Uncommon (NZ TCS)

Scientific classification
- Kingdom: Animalia
- Phylum: Arthropoda
- Subphylum: Chelicerata
- Class: Arachnida
- Order: Araneae
- Infraorder: Araneomorphae
- Family: Stiphidiidae
- Genus: Neoramia
- Species: N. nana

Binomial name
- Neoramia nana Forster & Wilton, 1973

Species of spider

Neoramia nana is a species of Stiphidiidae that is endemic to New Zealand.

== Taxonomy ==
This species was described in 1973 by Ray Forster and Cecil Wilton from male and female specimens. The holotype is stored in Otago Museum.

== Description ==
The male is recorded at 7.2mm in length whereas the female is 8.5mm. The cephalothorax is coloured orange brown and darkens anteriorly. The legs are yellowish brown with dark bands. The abdomen is patterned dorsally.

== Distribution ==
This species is only known from Otago, New Zealand.

== Conservation status ==
Under the New Zealand Threat Classification System, this species is listed as "Naturally Uncommon" with the qualifier of "Range Restricted".
