= Aorangia otira =

Conservation status
- Data Deficit (NZ TCS)

Scientific classification
- Kingdom: Animalia
- Phylum: Arthropoda
- Subphylum: Chelicerata
- Class: Arachnida
- Order: Araneae
- Infraorder: Araneomorphae
- Family: Stiphidiidae
- Genus: Aorangia
- Species: A. otira

Binomial name
- Aorangia otira Forster & Wilton, 1973

Species of spider

Aorangia otira is a species of Stiphidiidae that is endemic to New Zealand.

== Taxonomy ==
This species was described by Ray Forster and Cecil Wilton in 1973 from male and female specimens. The holotype is stored in Canterbury Museum.

== Description ==
The male is recorded at 3.72mm in length whereas the female is 4.20mm. The carapace is coloured yellowish brown. The legs are pale yellow with dark bands. The abdomen has a dark chevron pattern dorsally.

== Distribution ==
This species is only known from Canterbury, New Zealand.

== Conservation status ==
Under the New Zealand Threat Classification System, this species is listed as "Data Deficient" with the qualifiers of "Data Poor: Size" and "Data Poor: Trend".
