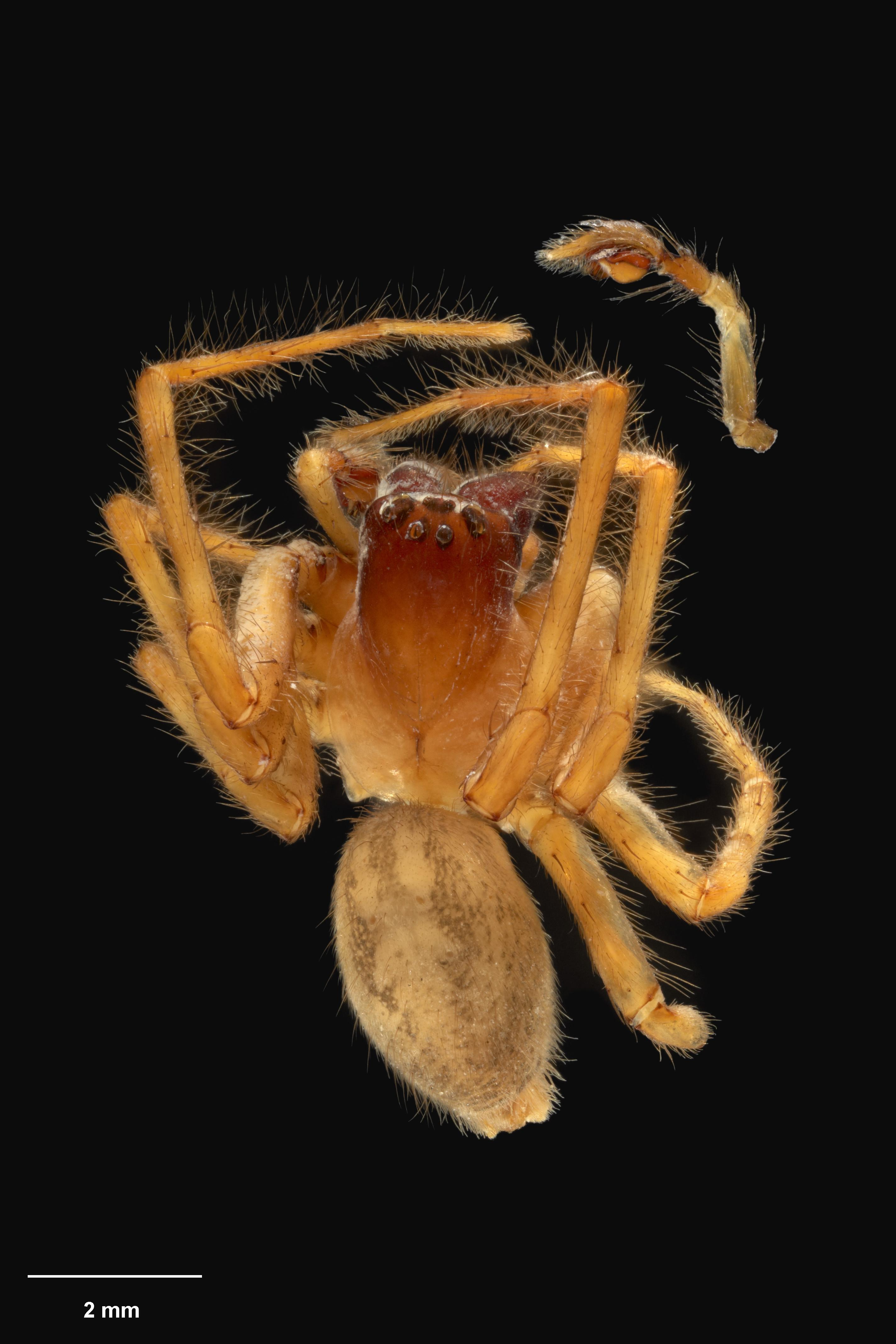

Conservation status
- Not Threatened (NZ TCS)

Scientific classification
- Kingdom: Animalia
- Phylum: Arthropoda
- Subphylum: Chelicerata
- Class: Arachnida
- Order: Araneae
- Infraorder: Araneomorphae
- Family: Stiphidiidae
- Genus: Neoramia
- Species: N. fiordensis

Binomial name
- Neoramia fiordensis Forster & Wilton, 1973

= Neoramia fiordensis =

Species of spider

Neoramia fiordensis is a species of Stiphidiidae that is endemic to New Zealand.

== Taxonomy ==
This species was described in 1973 by Ray Forster and Cecil Wilton from male and female specimens. The holotype is stored in Te Papa Museum under registration number AS.000025.

== Description ==
The male is recorded at 5.78mm in length whereas the female is 8.67mm. The cephalothorax is pale brown and is dark reddish brown anteriorly. The abdomen is pale with black shading dorsally.

== Distribution ==
This species is only known from Fiordland, New Zealand.

== Conservation status ==
Under the New Zealand Threat Classification System, this species is listed as "Not Threatened".
