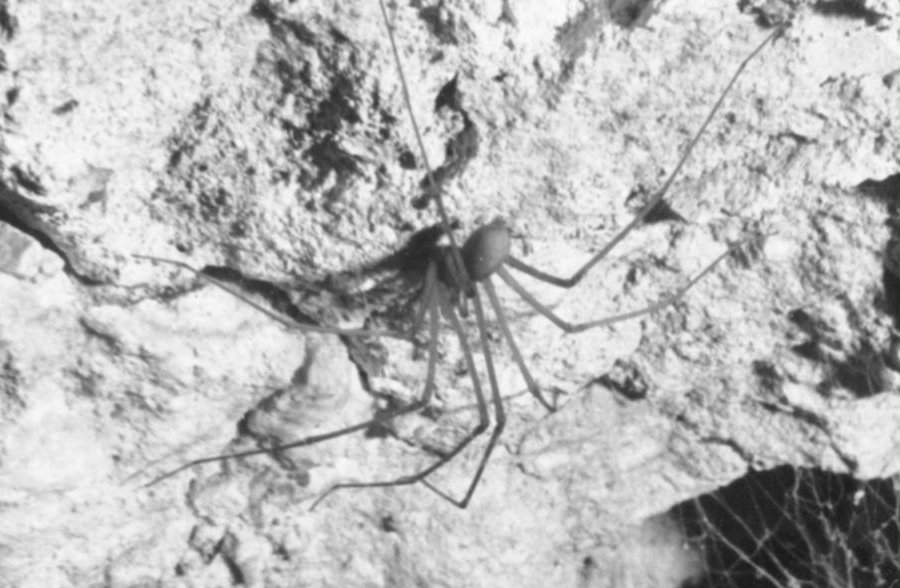
- Tartarus mullamullangensis

Scientific classification
- Kingdom: Animalia
- Phylum: Arthropoda
- Subphylum: Chelicerata
- Class: Arachnida
- Order: Araneae
- Infraorder: Araneomorphae
- Family: Stiphidiidae
- Genus: Tartarus; Gray, 1973

Species
- See text

Diversity
- 4 species

= Tartarus (spider) =

Genus of spiders

Tartarus is a genus of spiders in the family Stiphidiidae. All four described species are found in cave systems of Western Australia. These are located in the karst area of the Nullarbor Plain. They are likely relict species from a time when the region was much more humid, given the fact that the other members of the family Stiphidiidae in Southern Australia live in forests.

== Names ==
The genus name is derived from Tartarus, a place in the underworld of Greek mythology, even lower than Hades. All four species take their common names, and the specific epithet, from the caves in which they were first collected.

Tartarus murdochensis and Tartarus thampannensis are both commonly called Murdoch sink cave spider, Tartarus nurinensis is also known as the Nurina cave spider.

== Species ==
As of January 2026, this genus includes four species:

- Tartarus mullamullangensis Gray, 1973 – Australia (Western Australia)
- Tartarus murdochensis Gray, 1992 – Australia (Western Australia)
- Tartarus nurinensis Gray, 1992 – Australia (Western Australia)
- Tartarus thampannensis Gray, 1992 – Australia (Western Australia)
