= Neoramia charybdis =

Conservation status
- Naturally Uncommon (NZ TCS)

Scientific classification
- Kingdom: Animalia
- Phylum: Arthropoda
- Subphylum: Chelicerata
- Class: Arachnida
- Order: Araneae
- Infraorder: Araneomorphae
- Family: Stiphidiidae
- Genus: Neoramia
- Species: N. charybdis

Binomial name
- Neoramia charybdis (Hogg, 1910)

Synonyms
- Amaurobius charybdis; Ixeuticus charybdis; Oramia charybdis

Species of spider

Neoramia charybdis is a species of Stiphidiidae that is endemic to New Zealand.

== Taxonomy ==
This species was first described as Amaurobius charybdis in 1910 by Henry Roughton Hogg from a male specimen. It was mostly recently revised in 1973, in which it was moved to Neoramia genus. It is the type species for this genus. The holotype is stored in Otago Museum.

== Description ==
The male and female are recorded at 12.2mm in length. The cephalothorax is coloured orange yellow and is darker anteriorly. The legs are yellow brown with some dark bands. The abdomen is greyish brown with pale markings dorsally.

== Distribution ==
This species is known from Southland, Stewart Island and Campbell Island in New Zealand.

== Conservation status ==
Under the New Zealand Threat Classification System, this species is listed as "Naturally Uncommon".
