= Neolana dalmasi =

Conservation status
- Not Threatened (NZ TCS)

Scientific classification
- Domain: Eukaryota
- Kingdom: Animalia
- Phylum: Arthropoda
- Subphylum: Chelicerata
- Class: Arachnida
- Order: Araneae
- Infraorder: Araneomorphae
- Family: Stiphidiidae
- Genus: Neolana
- Species: N. dalmasi

Binomial name
- Neolana dalmasi (Marples, 1959)

Synonyms
- Ixeuticus dalmasi; Marplesia dalmasi

Species of spider

Neolana dalmasi is a species of spider in the family Stiphidiidae that is endemic to New Zealand.

== Taxonomy ==
This species was described as Ixeuticus dalmasi by Brian John Marples in 1959 from female specimens. It was most recently revised in 1973. The holotype is stored in Otago Museum.

== Description ==
The female is recorded at 6.18mm in length whereas the male is 6.80mm. The carapace is coloured yellow brown. The legs are pale brown with bands. The abdomen is dark patches dorsally.

== Distribution ==
This species is known from the North Island of New Zealand.

== Conservation status ==
Under the New Zealand Threat Classification System, this species is listed as "Not Threatened".
