= Neoramia janus =

Conservation status
- Not Threatened (NZ TCS)

Scientific classification
- Kingdom: Animalia
- Phylum: Arthropoda
- Subphylum: Chelicerata
- Class: Arachnida
- Order: Araneae
- Infraorder: Araneomorphae
- Family: Stiphidiidae
- Genus: Neoramia
- Species: N. janus

Binomial name
- Neoramia janus (Bryant, 1935)

Synonyms
- Ixeuticus janus

Species of spider

Neoramia janus is a species of Stiphidiidae that is endemic to New Zealand.

== Taxonomy ==
This species was described as Ixeuticus janus in 1935 by Elizabeth Bryant from female specimens. It was revised in 1973, in which it was moved to the Neoramia genus. The holotype is stored in Canterbury Museum.

== Description ==
The male is recorded at 7.7mm in length whereas the female is 8.2mm. The carapace is coloured pale yellow and darker anteriorly. The legs are pale yellow with dark bands. The abdomen is pale with a faint pattern dorsally.

== Distribution ==
This species is only known from Canterbury, New Zealand.

== Conservation status ==
Under the New Zealand Threat Classification System, this species is listed as "Not Threatened".
