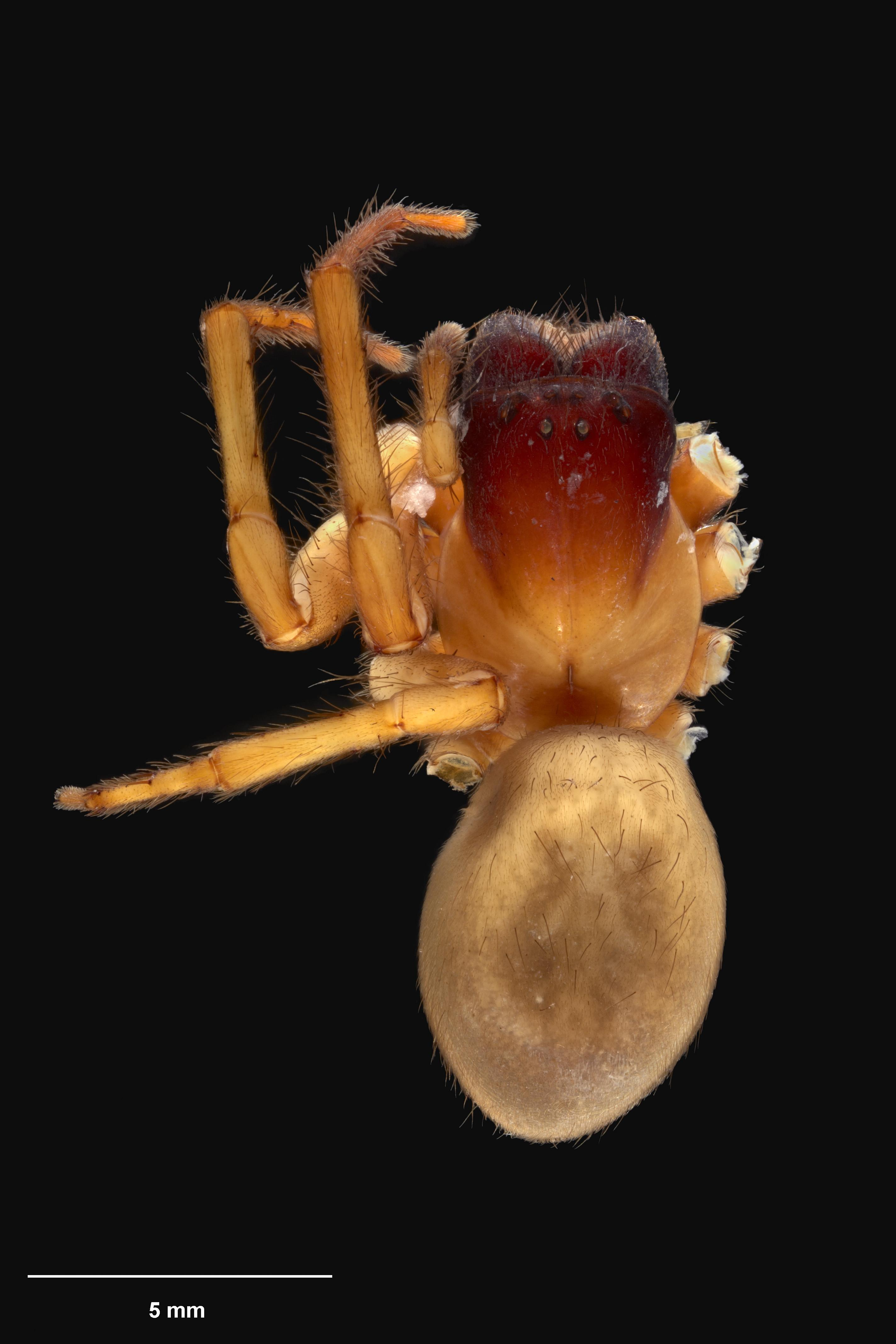

Conservation status
- Data Deficit (NZ TCS)

Scientific classification
- Kingdom: Animalia
- Phylum: Arthropoda
- Subphylum: Chelicerata
- Class: Arachnida
- Order: Araneae
- Infraorder: Araneomorphae
- Family: Stiphidiidae
- Genus: Neoramia
- Species: N. hokina

Binomial name
- Neoramia hokina Forster & Wilton, 1973

= Neoramia hokina =

Species of spider

Neoramia hokina is a species of Stiphidiidae that is endemic to New Zealand.

== Taxonomy ==
This species was first described from a single female specimen by Ray Forster and Cecil Wilton in 1973. The holotype specimen was collected by Richard Dell and Beverley Holloway at Mokinui Island, off Stewart Island, during the 1955 Dominion Museum expedition.

The holotype specimen is stored at Te Papa under registration number AS.000043.

== Description ==
The body is almost 14 mm (0.55 in) in length. The carapace is mainly yellowish orange. The carapace becomes dark red towards the eyes. The chelicerae are dark red. The abdomen is yellowish brown.

== Distribution ==
This species is only known from one location in southwestern Stewart Island in New Zealand.

== Conservation status ==
Under the New Zealand Threat Classification System, this species is listed as Data Deficient with the qualifiers of "Data Poor: Size" and "Data Poor: Trend".
