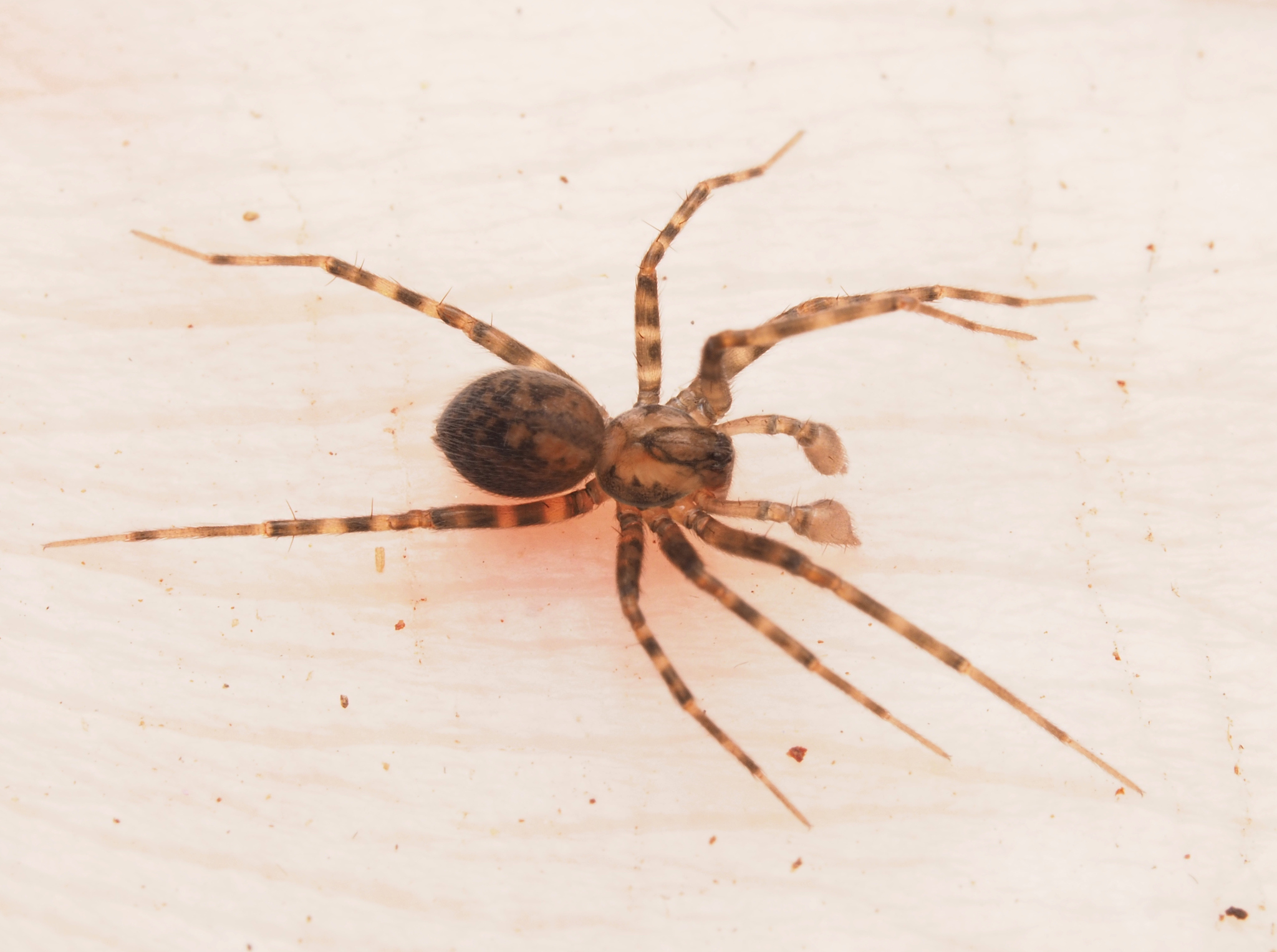
- Procambridgea hilleri

Scientific classification
- Kingdom: Animalia
- Phylum: Arthropoda
- Subphylum: Chelicerata
- Class: Arachnida
- Order: Araneae
- Infraorder: Araneomorphae
- Family: Stiphidiidae
- Genus: Procambridgea; Forster & Wilton, 1973

Type species
- P. rainbowi Forster & Wilton, 1973

Species
- 12, see text

= Procambridgea =

Genus of spiders

Procambridgea is a genus of South Pacific sheetweb spiders that was first described by Raymond Robert Forster & C. L. Wilton in 1973.

== Species ==
As of September 2019 it contains twelve species, found in New Zealand and Australia:

- Procambridgea carrai Davies, 2001 – Australia (New South Wales)
- Procambridgea cavernicola Forster & Wilton, 1973 – Australia (New South Wales)
- Procambridgea grayi Davies, 2001 – Australia (New South Wales), New Zealand
- Procambridgea hilleri Davies, 2001 – Australia (Queensland)
- Procambridgea hunti Davies, 2001 – Australia (New South Wales)
- Procambridgea kioloa Davies, 2001 – Australia (New South Wales)
- Procambridgea lamington Davies, 2001 – Australia (Queensland)
- Procambridgea montana Davies, 2001 – Australia (Queensland, New South Wales)
- Procambridgea monteithi Davies, 2001 – Australia (New South Wales)
- Procambridgea otwayensis Davies, 2001 – Australia (Victoria)
- Procambridgea ourimbah Davies, 2001 – Australia (New South Wales)
- Procambridgea rainbowi Forster & Wilton, 1973 (type) – Australia (New South Wales)
