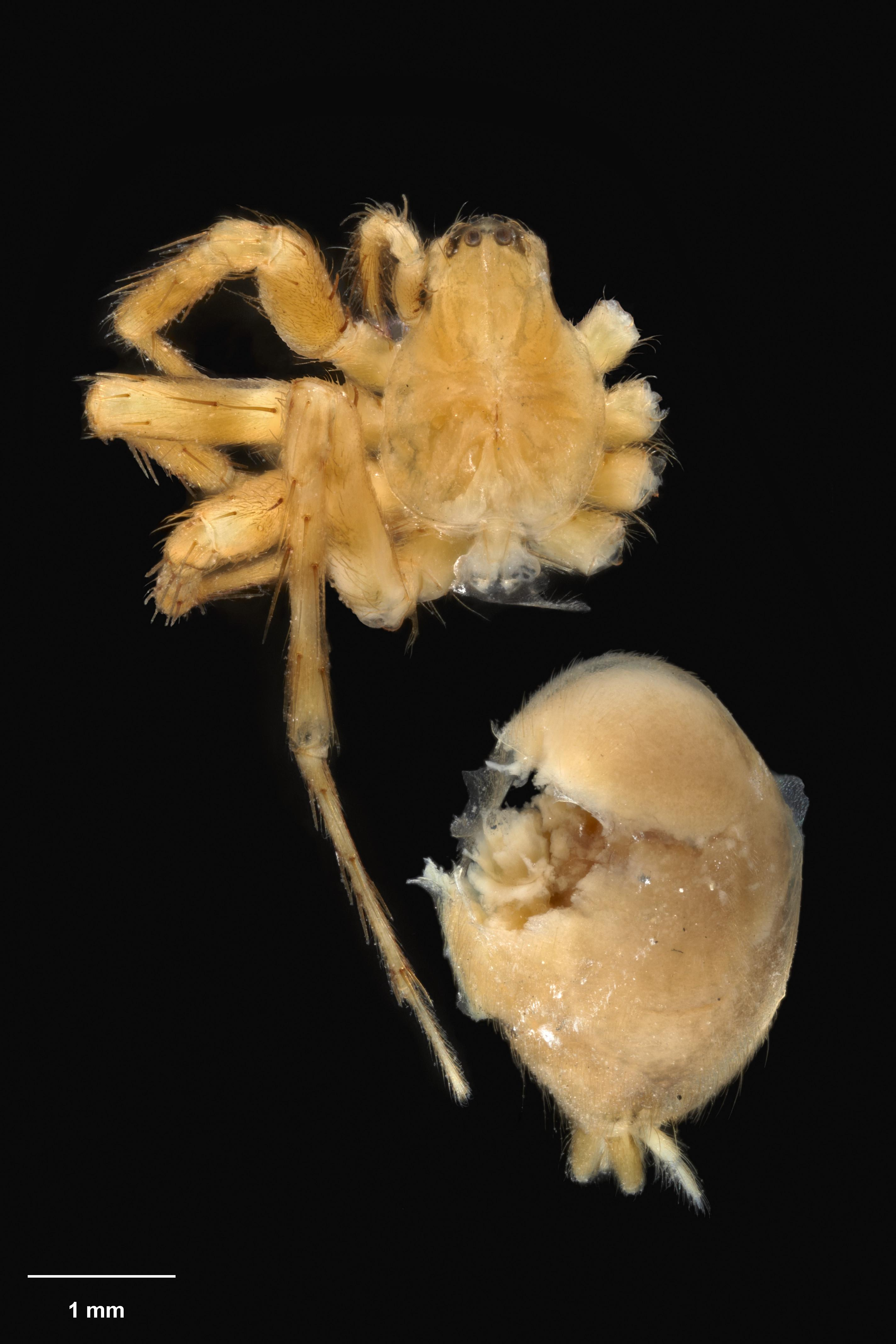

Conservation status
- Not Threatened (NZ TCS)

Scientific classification
- Kingdom: Animalia
- Phylum: Arthropoda
- Subphylum: Chelicerata
- Class: Arachnida
- Order: Araneae
- Infraorder: Araneomorphae
- Family: Stiphidiidae
- Genus: Aorangia
- Species: A. kapitiensis

Binomial name
- Aorangia kapitiensis Forster & Wilton, 1973

= Aorangia kapitiensis =

Species of spider

Aorangia kapitiensis is a species of Stiphidiidae that is endemic to New Zealand.

== Taxonomy ==
This species was described by Ray Forster and Cecil Wilton in 1973 from female specimens. The holotype is stored in Te Papa Museum under registration number AS.000057.

== Description ==
The female is recorded at 5.12mm in length. The carapace is coloured yellowish brown with dark markings. The abdomen is pale brown.

== Distribution ==
This species is only known from Wellington, New Zealand.

== Conservation status ==
Under the New Zealand Threat Classification System, this species is listed as "Not Threatened".
