= Aorangia poppelwelli =

Conservation status
- Naturally Uncommon (NZ TCS)

Scientific classification
- Kingdom: Animalia
- Phylum: Arthropoda
- Subphylum: Chelicerata
- Class: Arachnida
- Order: Araneae
- Infraorder: Araneomorphae
- Family: Stiphidiidae
- Genus: Aorangia
- Species: A. poppelwelli

Binomial name
- Aorangia poppelwelli Forster & Wilton, 1973

Species of spider

Aorangia poppelwelli is a species of Stiphidiidae that is endemic to New Zealand.

== Taxonomy ==
This species was described by Ray Forster and Cecil Wilton in 1973 from female and male specimens. The holotype is stored in Otago Museum.

== Description ==
The female is recorded at 4.32mm in length whereas the male is 6.50mm. The carapace is coloured yellow brown and has dark streaks. The legs are yellow brown and has dark bands. The abdomen is shaded dark brown with pale markings dorsally.

== Distribution ==
This species is only known from Otago, New Zealand.

== Conservation status ==
Under the New Zealand Threat Classification System, this species is listed as "Naturally Uncommon" with the qualifier of "Range Restricted".
