= Neoramia marama =

Conservation status
- Data Deficit (NZ TCS)

Scientific classification
- Kingdom: Animalia
- Phylum: Arthropoda
- Subphylum: Chelicerata
- Class: Arachnida
- Order: Araneae
- Infraorder: Araneomorphae
- Family: Stiphidiidae
- Genus: Neoramia
- Species: N. marama

Binomial name
- Neoramia marama Forster & Wilton, 1973

Species of spider

Neoramia marama is a species of Stiphidiidae that is endemic to New Zealand.

== Taxonomy ==
This species was described in 1973 by Ray Forster and Cecil Wilton from a female specimen. The holotype is stored in Canterbury Museum.

== Description ==
The female is recorded at 9mm in length. The cephalothorax is coloured yellowish orange and darkens anteriorly. The legs are pale yellow with dark bands. The abdomen has pale markings dorsally.

== Distribution ==
This species is only known from Marlborough, New Zealand.

== Conservation status ==
Under the New Zealand Threat Classification System, this species is listed as "Data Deficient" with the qualifiers of "Data Poor: Size", "Data Poor: Trend" and "One Location".
