= Procambridgea grayi =

Scientific classification
- Kingdom: Animalia
- Phylum: Arthropoda
- Subphylum: Chelicerata
- Class: Arachnida
- Order: Araneae
- Infraorder: Araneomorphae
- Family: Stiphidiidae
- Genus: Procambridgea
- Species: P. grayi

Binomial name
- Procambridgea grayi Davies, 2001

Species of spider

Procambridgea grayi is a species of spider in the family Stiphidiidae that is endemic to Australia and introduced to New Zealand.

== Taxonomy ==
This species was described in by Valerie Todd Davies in 2001 from male and female specimens. The species is named after arachnologist Michael R. Gray.

== Description ==
The male is recorded at 3.9–4.1 mm in length whereas the female is 3.3–4.6 mm. It can be distinguished from other species of Procambridgea by minor differences in genitalia.

== Distribution ==
This species is endemic to Sydney, Australia. It is also introduced to New Zealand.
