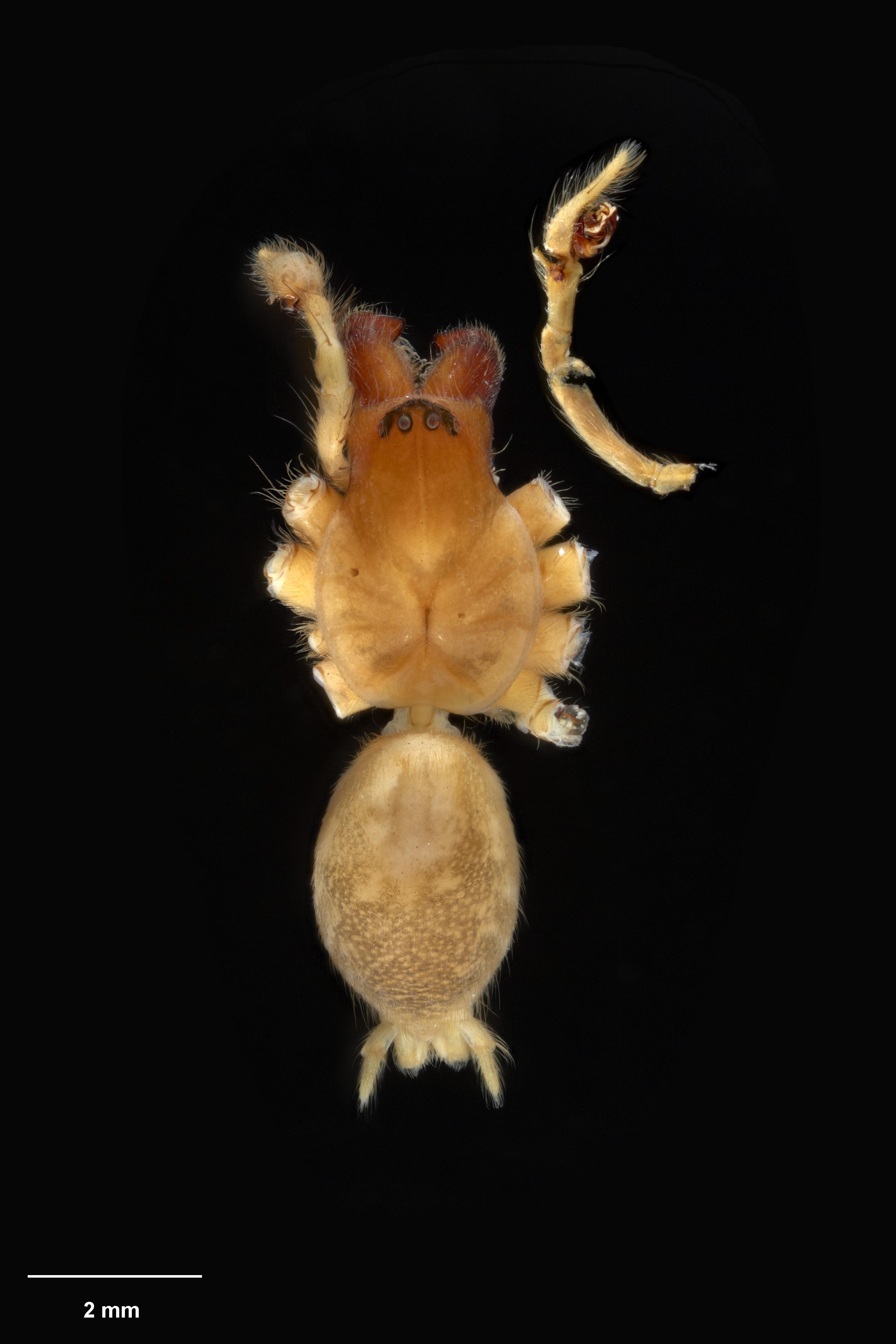

Conservation status
- Data Deficit (NZ TCS)

Scientific classification
- Kingdom: Animalia
- Phylum: Arthropoda
- Subphylum: Chelicerata
- Class: Arachnida
- Order: Araneae
- Infraorder: Araneomorphae
- Family: Stiphidiidae
- Genus: Aorangia
- Species: A. tumida

Binomial name
- Aorangia tumida Forster & Wilton, 1973

= Aorangia tumida =

Species of spider

Aorangia tumida is a species of Stiphidiidae that is endemic to New Zealand.

== Taxonomy ==
This species was described by Ray Forster and Cecil Wilton in 1973 from a male specimen. The holotype is stored in Te Papa Museum under registration number AS.000120.

== Description ==
The male is recorded at 7.45mm in length.

== Distribution ==
This species is only known from Wellington, New Zealand.

== Conservation status ==
Under the New Zealand Threat Classification System, this species is listed as "Data Deficient" with the qualifier of "Data Poor: Size", "Data Poor: Trend" and "One Location".
