= Marplesia dugdalei =

Conservation status
- Not Threatened (NZ TCS)

Scientific classification
- Kingdom: Animalia
- Phylum: Arthropoda
- Subphylum: Chelicerata
- Class: Arachnida
- Order: Araneae
- Infraorder: Araneomorphae
- Family: Stiphidiidae
- Genus: Marplesia
- Species: M. dugdalei

Binomial name
- Marplesia dugdalei Forster & Wilton, 1973

Species of spider

Marplesia dugdalei is a species of spider in the family Stiphidiidae that is endemic to New Zealand.

== Taxonomy ==
This species was described by Ray Forster and Cecil Wilton in 1973 from female and male specimens. The holotype is stored in Otago Museum.

== Description ==
The female is recorded at 6.72mm in length whereas the male is 4.55mm. The carapace is coloured straw yellow and is darker anteriorly. The abdomen is uniform grey.

== Distribution ==
This species is only known from Canterbury, New Zealand.

== Conservation status ==
Under the New Zealand Threat Classification System, this species is listed as "Not Threatened".
