= Neoramia komata =

Conservation status
- Not Threatened (NZ TCS)

Scientific classification
- Kingdom: Animalia
- Phylum: Arthropoda
- Subphylum: Chelicerata
- Class: Arachnida
- Order: Araneae
- Infraorder: Araneomorphae
- Family: Stiphidiidae
- Genus: Neoramia
- Species: N. komata

Binomial name
- Neoramia komata Forster & Wilton, 1973

Species of spider

Neoramia komata is a species of Stiphidiidae that is endemic to New Zealand.

== Taxonomy ==
This species was described in 1973 by Ray Forster and Cecil Wilton from male and female specimens. The holotype is stored in Otago Museum.

== Description ==
The male is recorded at 7.4mm in length whereas the female is 9.1mm. The cephalothorax is coloured yellowish orange and is darker anteriorly. The legs are yellowish orange with dark bands. The abdomen is dark brown with minimal patterning.

== Distribution ==
This species is only known from Fiordland, New Zealand.

== Conservation status ==
Under the New Zealand Threat Classification System, this species is listed as "Not Threatened" with the qualifiers of "Data Poor: Size" and "Data Poor: Trend".
