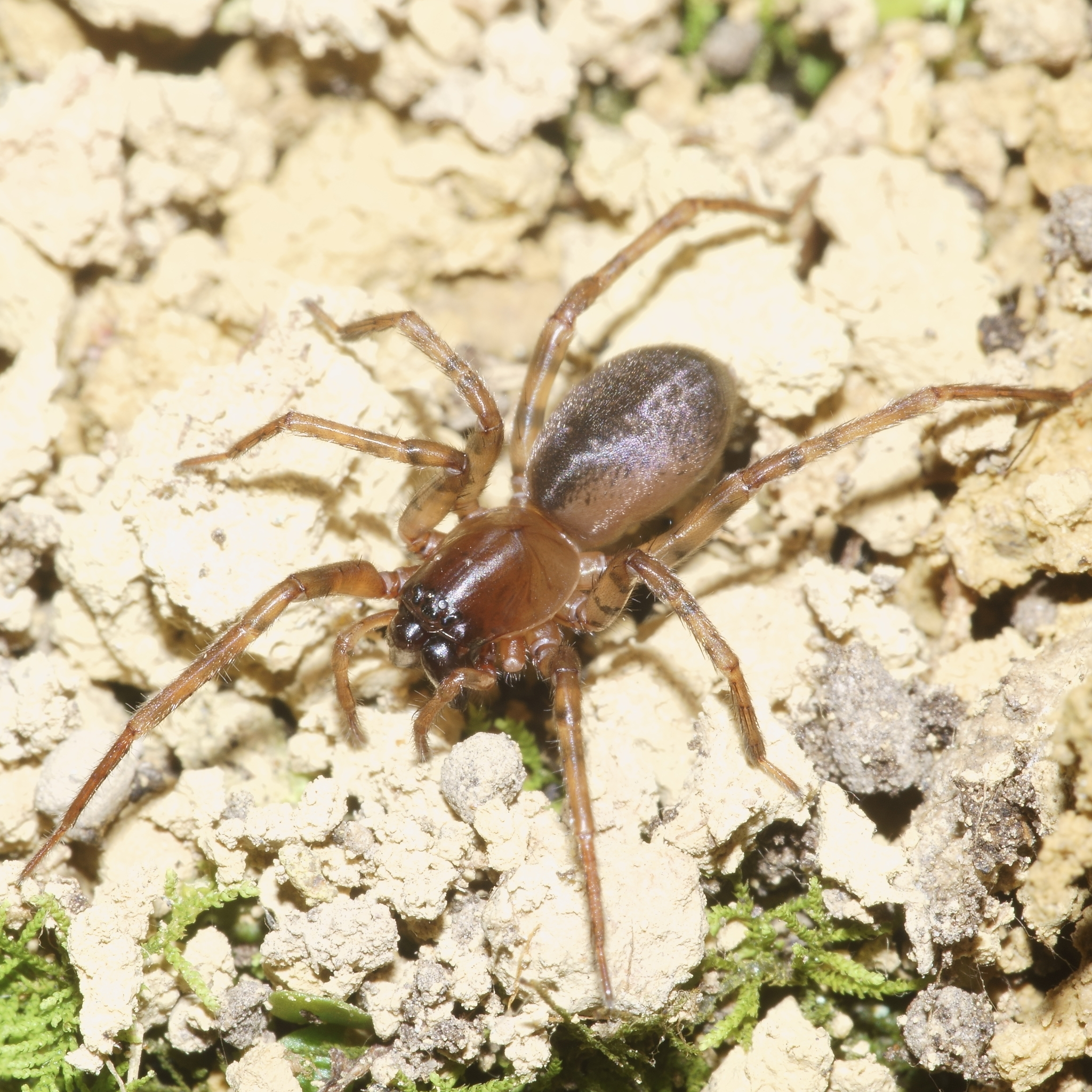
- Neoramia setosa

Scientific classification
- Kingdom: Animalia
- Phylum: Arthropoda
- Subphylum: Chelicerata
- Class: Arachnida
- Order: Araneae
- Infraorder: Araneomorphae
- Family: Stiphidiidae
- Genus: Neoramia; Forster & Wilton, 1973

Type species
- N. charybdis (Hogg, 1910)

Species
- 22, see text

= Neoramia =

Genus of spiders

Neoramia is a genus of South Pacific sheetweb spiders first described by Raymond Robert Forster & C. L. Wilton in 1973.

== Species ==
As of April 2019 it contains twenty-two species, all from New Zealand:

- Neoramia allanae Forster & Wilton, 1973 – New Zealand
- Neoramia alta Forster & Wilton, 1973 – New Zealand
- Neoramia charybdis (Hogg, 1910) – New Zealand
- Neoramia childi Forster & Wilton, 1973 – New Zealand
- Neoramia crucifera (Hogg, 1909) – New Zealand (Auckland Is.)
- Neoramia finschi (L. Koch, 1872) – New Zealand
- Neoramia fiordensis Forster & Wilton, 1973 – New Zealand
- Neoramia hoggi (Forster, 1964) – New Zealand (Campbell Is.)
- Neoramia hokina Forster & Wilton, 1973 – New Zealand
- Neoramia janus (Bryant, 1935) – New Zealand
- Neoramia koha Forster & Wilton, 1973 – New Zealand
- Neoramia komata Forster & Wilton, 1973 – New Zealand
- Neoramia mamoea Forster & Wilton, 1973 – New Zealand
- Neoramia marama Forster & Wilton, 1973 – New Zealand
- Neoramia margaretae Forster & Wilton, 1973 – New Zealand
- Neoramia matua Forster & Wilton, 1973 – New Zealand
- Neoramia minuta Forster & Wilton, 1973 – New Zealand
- Neoramia nana Forster & Wilton, 1973 – New Zealand
- Neoramia oroua Forster & Wilton, 1973 – New Zealand
- Neoramia otagoa Forster & Wilton, 1973 – New Zealand
- Neoramia raua Forster & Wilton, 1973 – New Zealand
- Neoramia setosa (Bryant, 1935) – New Zealand
