= Aorangia fiordensis =

Conservation status
- Data Deficit (NZ TCS)

Scientific classification
- Kingdom: Animalia
- Phylum: Arthropoda
- Subphylum: Chelicerata
- Class: Arachnida
- Order: Araneae
- Infraorder: Araneomorphae
- Family: Stiphidiidae
- Genus: Aorangia
- Species: A. fiordensis

Binomial name
- Aorangia fiordensis Forster & Wilton, 1973

Species of spider

Aorangia fiordensis is a species of Stiphidiidae that is endemic to New Zealand.

== Taxonomy ==
This species was described by Ray Forster and Cecil Wilton in 1973 from male specimens. The holotype is stored in Otago Museum.

== Description ==
The male is recorded at 4.80mm in length. The carapace is coloured yellowish brown. The legs are yellow brown with dark brown patches. The abdomen is shaded blackish brown and has an indistinct chevron pattern dorsally.

== Distribution ==
This species is only known from Fiordland, New Zealand.

== Conservation status ==
Under the New Zealand Threat Classification System, this species is listed as "Data Deficient" with the qualifiers of "Data Poor: Size", "Data Poor: Trend" and "One Location".
