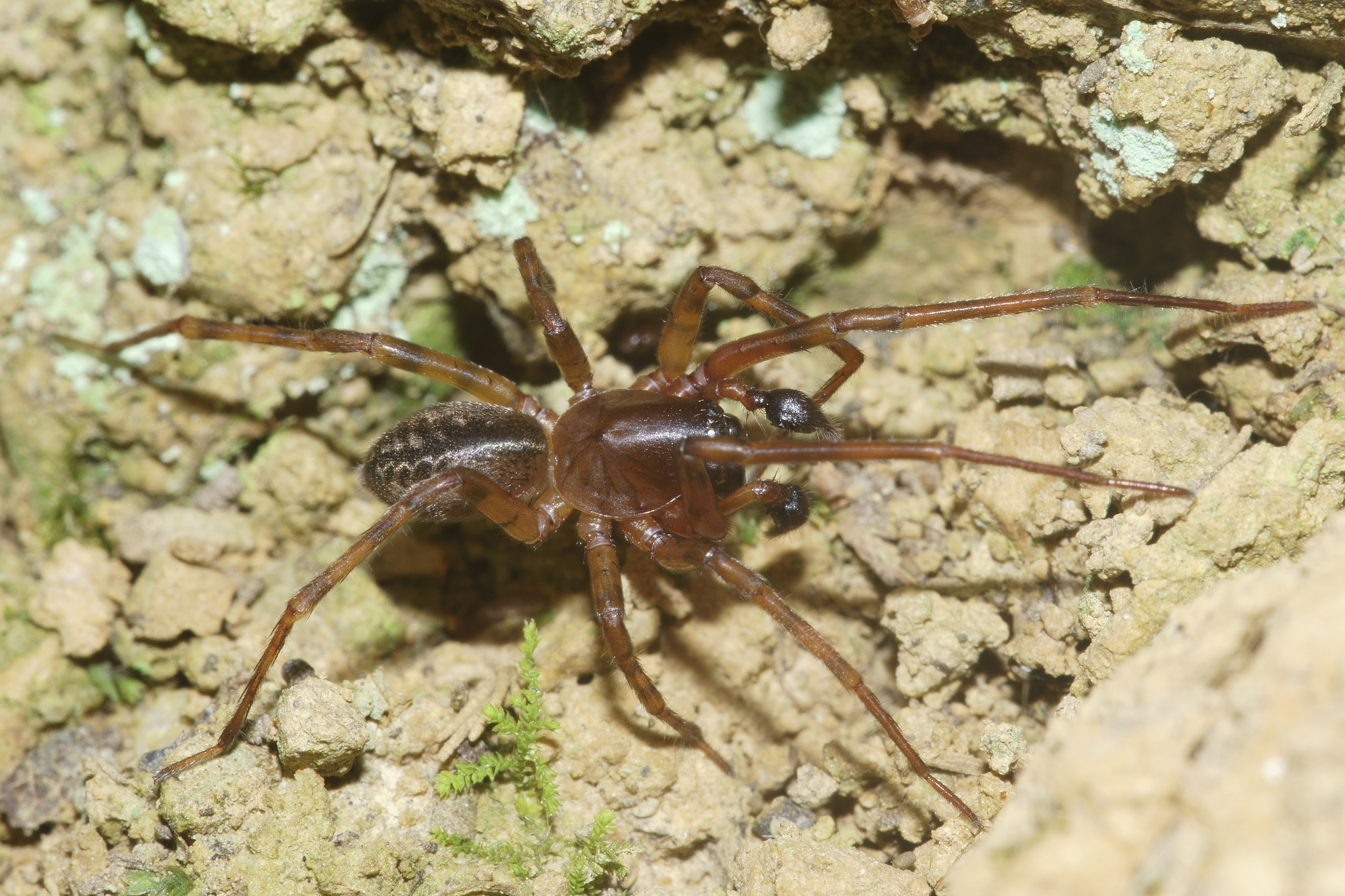

Conservation status
- Data Deficient (NZ TCS)

Scientific classification
- Kingdom: Animalia
- Phylum: Arthropoda
- Subphylum: Chelicerata
- Class: Arachnida
- Order: Araneae
- Infraorder: Araneomorphae
- Family: Stiphidiidae
- Genus: Neoramia
- Species: N. setosa

Binomial name
- Neoramia setosa (Bryant, 1935)

Synonyms
- Ixeuticus setosus; Ixeuticus charybdis

= Neoramia setosa =

Species of spider

Neoramia setosa is a species of Stiphidiidae that is endemic to New Zealand.

== Taxonomy ==
This species was described as Ixeuticus setosus in 1935 by Elizabeth Bryant from a female specimen. It was revised in 1973, in which it was moved to the Neoramia genus. The holotype is stored in Canterbury Museum.

== Description ==
The female is recorded at 10.9mm in length whereas the male is 9.7mm. The cephalothorax is coloured pale yellow and darkens anteriorly. The legs are pale yellow and are banded. The abdomen is dark with an anterior median band.

== Distribution ==
This species is only known from Canterbury, New Zealand.

== Conservation status ==
Under the New Zealand Threat Classification System, this species is listed as "Data Deficient" with the qualifiers of "Data Poor: Size" and "Data Poor: Trend".
