= Neoramia oroua =

Conservation status
- Not Threatened (NZ TCS)

Scientific classification
- Kingdom: Animalia
- Phylum: Arthropoda
- Subphylum: Chelicerata
- Class: Arachnida
- Order: Araneae
- Infraorder: Araneomorphae
- Family: Stiphidiidae
- Genus: Neoramia
- Species: N. oroua

Binomial name
- Neoramia oroua Forster & Wilton, 1973

Species of spider

Neoramia oroua is a species of Stiphidiidae that is endemic to New Zealand.

== Taxonomy ==
This species was described in 1973 by Ray Forster and Cecil Wilton from male and female specimens. The holotype is stored in Otago Museum.

== Description ==
The male is recorded at 9.1mm in length whereas the female is 10.2mm. The cephalothorax is coloured pale orange and darkens anteriorly. The legs are brownish yellow with dark bands. The abdomen is pale greyish brown with brown flecks.

== Distribution ==
This species is only known from the North Island of New Zealand.

== Conservation status ==
Under the New Zealand Threat Classification System, this species is listed as "Not Threatened".
