= Marplesia =

Scientific classification
- Kingdom: Animalia
- Phylum: Arthropoda
- Subphylum: Chelicerata
- Class: Arachnida
- Order: Araneae
- Infraorder: Araneomorphae
- Family: Stiphidiidae
- Genus: Marplesia; Lehtinen, 1967

Type species
- M. dugdalei Forster & Wilton, 1973

Species
- M. dugdalei Forster & Wilton, 1973 – New Zealand; M. pohara Forster & Wilton, 1973 – New Zealand

Genus of spiders

Marplesia is a genus of sheetweb spiders first described by Pekka T. Lehtinen in 1967. As of April 2019, it contained only two species, both found in New Zealand.
