= Tartarus murdochensis =

Scientific classification
- Kingdom: Animalia
- Phylum: Arthropoda
- Subphylum: Chelicerata
- Class: Arachnida
- Order: Araneae
- Infraorder: Araneomorphae
- Family: Stiphidiidae
- Genus: Tartarus
- Species: T. murdochensis

Binomial name
- Tartarus murdochensis Gray, 1922
- Holotype site (AM KS18430 ♀): Phyllistine Flattener Cave (6N194), Hampton Tableland, Nullarbor Plain, WA

Species of spider

Tartarus murdochensis is a cave spider from Western Australia, in the family Stiphidiidae. The spider was first described in 1992 by Mike Gray.

== Name ==
The species epithet, murdochensis, refers to it being found in the Murdoch Sink, a submerged cave system in the Nullarbor Plain of Western and Southern Australia.

== Conservation status ==
In Western Australia, the species is listed as vulnerable.
