= Aorangia agama =

Conservation status
- Data Deficit (NZ TCS)

Scientific classification
- Kingdom: Animalia
- Phylum: Arthropoda
- Subphylum: Chelicerata
- Class: Arachnida
- Order: Araneae
- Infraorder: Araneomorphae
- Family: Stiphidiidae
- Genus: Aorangia
- Species: A. agama

Binomial name
- Aorangia agama Forster & Wilton, 1973

Species of spider

Aorangia agama is a species of Stiphidiidae that is endemic to New Zealand.

== Taxonomy ==
This species was described by Ray Forster and Cecil Wilton in 1973 from male and female specimens. The holotype is stored in Otago Museum.

== Description ==
The male is recorded at 6.60mm in length whereas the female is 6.65mm. The carapace is coloured yellow brown with a dark brown pattern dorsally. The abdomen is olive brown.

== Distribution ==
This species is only known from Taranaki, New Zealand.

== Conservation status ==
Under the New Zealand Threat Classification System, this species is listed as "Data Deficient" with the qualifiers of "Data Poor: Size" and "Data Poor: Trend".
