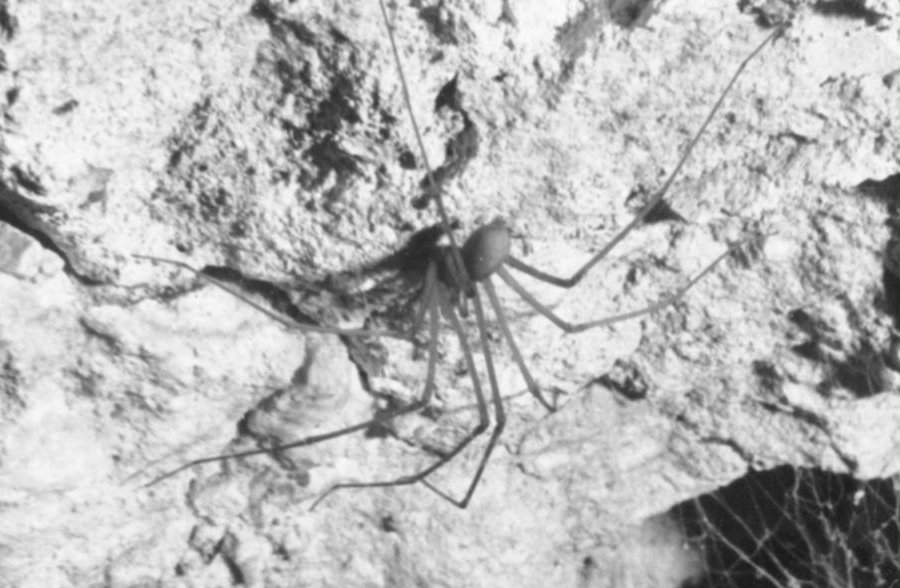

Scientific classification
- Kingdom: Animalia
- Phylum: Arthropoda
- Subphylum: Chelicerata
- Class: Arachnida
- Order: Araneae
- Infraorder: Araneomorphae
- Family: Stiphidiidae
- Genus: Tartarus
- Species: T. mullamullangensis

Binomial name
- Tartarus mullamullangensis Gray, 1973

Synonyms
- Baiami mullamullangensis

= Tartarus mullamullangensis =

Species of spider

Tartarus mullamullangensis, informally known as the Mullamullang cave spider, is a palm-sized, long-legged cave spider from Western Australia. Completely adapted to cave living, it is blind and totally lacks pigmentation, giving it a creamy white appearance.

The cylindrical lampshade-shaped web is spun out between rocks.

The species is closely related to spiders found in forests of Southern Australia. This makes it likely that T. mullamullangensis is a relict species from the time when the now arid region was much more humid.

First photo of the N37 cave spider discovered and photographed by Bill Crowle under the cairn built at the end of N37, (Mullamullang). Two miles underground along a large passage of many rockpiles, sanddunes and lakes, and about 300 ft under the surface. The black & white image Bill Crowle made can be seen on the right. The spider was later described by Mike Gray, who was on this trip.

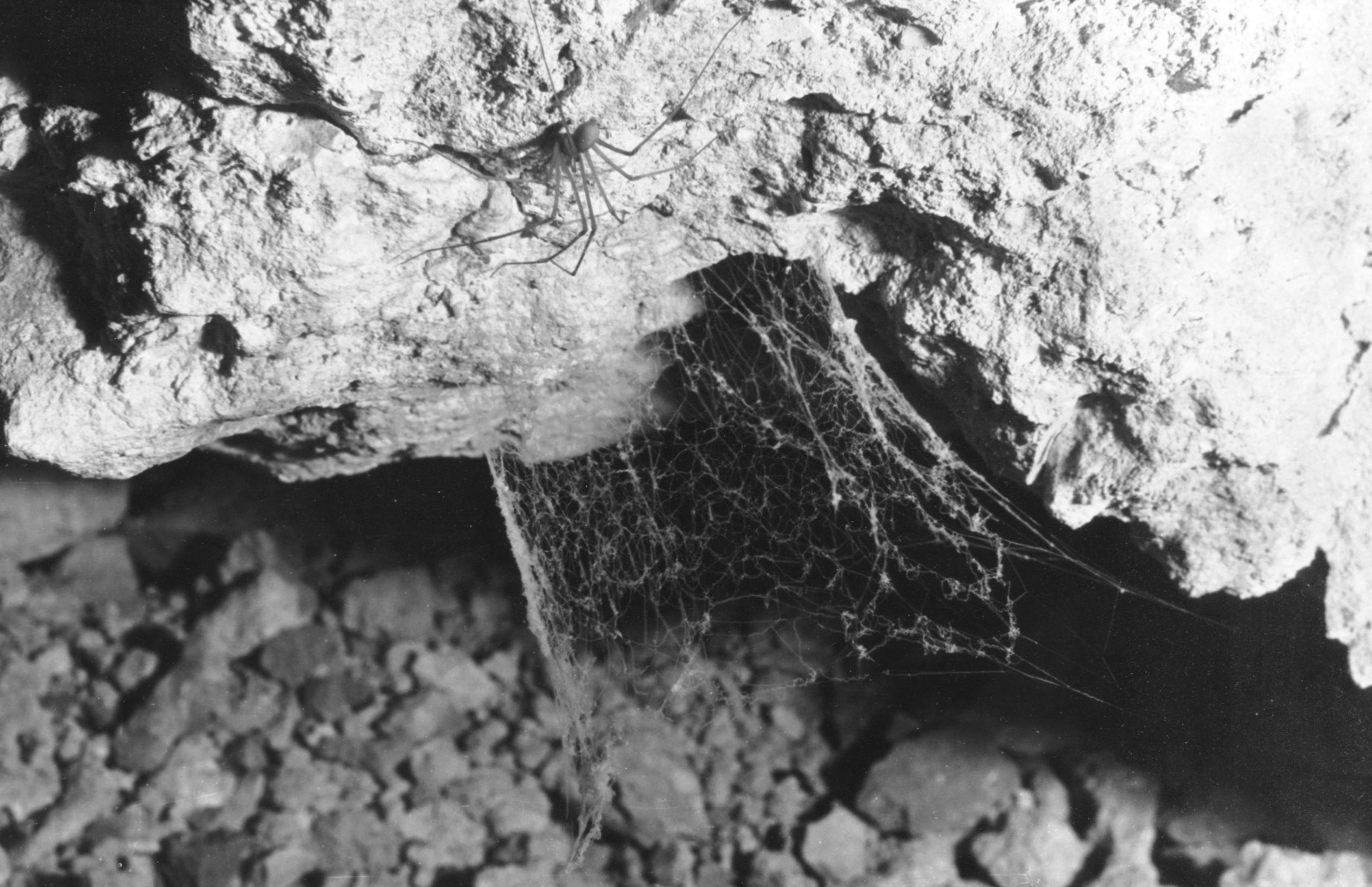
Mullamullang Spider with web

== Name ==
The species name is derived from Mullamullang, a cave system in the Nullarbor Plain of Western and Southern Australia.
