= Jamberoo (spider) =

Scientific classification
- Kingdom: Animalia
- Phylum: Arthropoda
- Subphylum: Chelicerata
- Class: Arachnida
- Order: Araneae
- Infraorder: Araneomorphae
- Family: Stiphidiidae
- Genus: Jamberoo; Gray & Smith, 2008

Type species
- J. johnnoblei Gray & Smith, 2008

Species
- 4, see text

Genus of spiders

Jamberoo is a genus of Australian sheetweb spiders that was first described by Michael R. Gray & H. M. Smith in 2008.

== Species ==
As of September 2019 it contains four species, found in Victoria and New South Wales:

- Jamberoo actensis Gray & Smith, 2008 – Australian Capital Territory
- Jamberoo australis Gray & Smith, 2008 – Australia (Victoria)
- Jamberoo boydensis Gray & Smith, 2008 – Australia (New South Wales)
- Jamberoo johnnoblei Gray & Smith, 2008 (type) – Australia (New South Wales)
