= Neolana =

Scientific classification
- Kingdom: Animalia
- Phylum: Arthropoda
- Subphylum: Chelicerata
- Class: Arachnida
- Order: Araneae
- Infraorder: Araneomorphae
- Family: Stiphidiidae
- Genus: Neolana; Forster & Wilton, 1973

Type species
- N. dalmasi (Marples, 1959)

Species
- N. dalmasi (Marples, 1959) – New Zealand; N. pallida Forster & Wilton, 1973 – New Zealand; N. septentrionalis Forster & Wilton, 1973 – New Zealand

Genus of spiders

Neolana is a genus of sheetweb spiders first described by Raymond Robert Forster & C. L. Wilton in 1973. As of April 2019 it contains only three species, all found in New Zealand.
