= Neoramia finschi =

Conservation status
- Data Deficient (NZ TCS)

Scientific classification
- Kingdom: Animalia
- Phylum: Arthropoda
- Subphylum: Chelicerata
- Class: Arachnida
- Order: Araneae
- Infraorder: Araneomorphae
- Family: Stiphidiidae
- Genus: Neoramia
- Species: N. finschi

Binomial name
- Neoramia finschi (L. Koch, 1872)

Synonyms
- Amaurobius finschii; Ixeuticus finschi

Species of spider

Neoramia finschi is a species of stiphidiidae that is endemic to New Zealand.

== Taxonomy ==
This species was described as Amaurobius finschii in 1872 by Ludwig Carl Christian Koch from a male specimen. It was most recently revised in 1973, in which it was moved to the Neoramia genus. The plesiotype is stored in Otago Museum.

== Description ==
The female is recorded at 14.1 mm (0.56 in) in length. The cephalothorax is coloured orange and darker anteriorly. The legs are cream with dark bands. The abdomen has a pale region anteriorly that fades posteriorly.

== Distribution ==
This species is only known from Auckland, New Zealand.

== Conservation status ==
Under the New Zealand Threat Classification System, this species is listed as "Data Deficient" with the qualifiers of "Data Poor: Size" and "Data Poor: Trend".
