= Neolana pallida =

Conservation status
- Data Deficit (NZ TCS)

Scientific classification
- Kingdom: Animalia
- Phylum: Arthropoda
- Subphylum: Chelicerata
- Class: Arachnida
- Order: Araneae
- Infraorder: Araneomorphae
- Family: Stiphidiidae
- Genus: Neolana
- Species: N. pallida

Binomial name
- Neolana pallida Forster & Wilton, 1973

Species of spider

Neolana pallida is a species of spider in the family Stiphidiidae that is endemic to New Zealand.

== Taxonomy ==
This species was described by Ray Forster and Cecil Wilton in 1973 from a female specimen. The holotype is stored in Otago Museum.

== Description ==
The female is recorded at 7.5mm in length. The carapace is coloured pale cream and orange anteriorly. The legs are pale with a faint orange colour. The abdomen is pale dorsally and ventrally with some dark shading.

== Distribution ==
This species is only known from Bay of Plenty, New Zealand.

== Conservation status ==
Under the New Zealand Threat Classification System, this species is listed as "Data Deficient" with the qualifiers of "Data Poor: Size" and "Data Poor: Trend".
