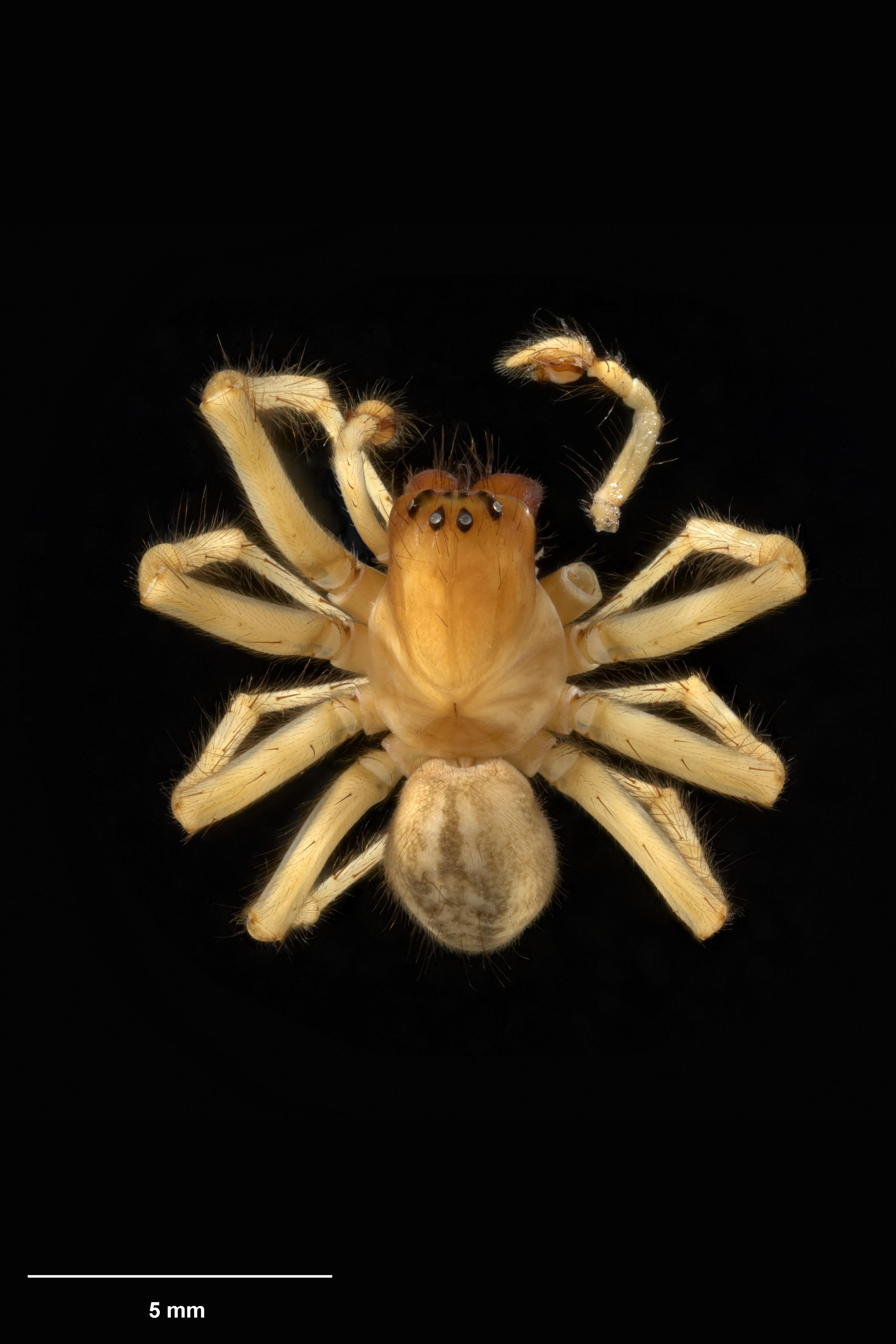

Conservation status
- Naturally Uncommon (NZ TCS)

Scientific classification
- Kingdom: Animalia
- Phylum: Arthropoda
- Subphylum: Chelicerata
- Class: Arachnida
- Order: Araneae
- Infraorder: Araneomorphae
- Family: Stiphidiidae
- Genus: Neoramia
- Species: N. hoggi

Binomial name
- Neoramia hoggi (Forster, 1964)

Synonyms
- Oramia hoggi

= Neoramia hoggi =

Species of spider

Neoramia hoggi is a species of Stiphidiidae that is endemic to New Zealand.

== Taxonomy ==
This species was described as Oramia hoggi in 1964 by Ray Forster from female and male specimens. It was revised in 1973, in which it was moved to the Neoramia genus. The holotype is stored in Te Papa Museum under registration number AS.000042.

== Description ==
The female and male are recorded at 8.82mm in length. The cephalothorax is coloured reddish brown and darker anteriorly. The legs are pale yellow. The abdomen is greyish brown with pale markings dorsally.

== Distribution ==
This species is only known from Campbell Island, New Zealand.

== Conservation status ==
Under the New Zealand Threat Classification System, this species is listed as "Naturally Uncommon" with the qualifiers of "Island Endemic" and "One Location".
