= Tjurunga paroculus =

Scientific classification
- Kingdom: Animalia
- Phylum: Arthropoda
- Subphylum: Chelicerata
- Class: Arachnida
- Order: Araneae
- Infraorder: Araneomorphae
- Family: Stiphidiidae
- Genus: Tjurunga; Lehtinen, 1967
- Species: T. paroculus

Binomial name
- Tjurunga paroculus (Simon, 1903)

Genus of spiders

Tjurunga is a monotypic genus of Tasmanian sheetweb spiders containing the single species, Tjurunga paroculus. The female of the species was first described by Eugène Simon in 1903 under the name Rubrius paroculus, and it was moved to its own genus in 1967.
