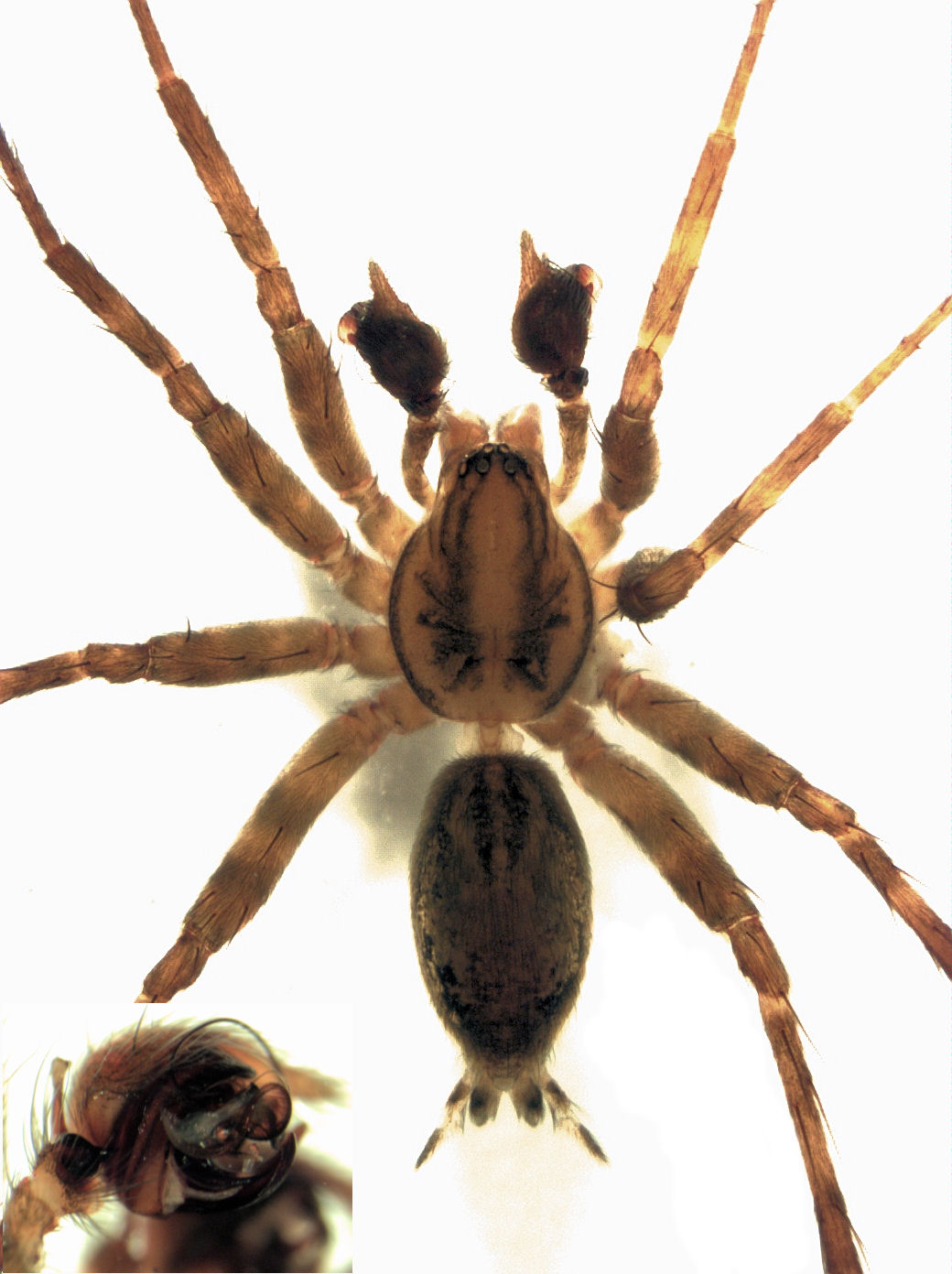
- Aorangia sp. (male)

Scientific classification
- Kingdom: Animalia
- Phylum: Arthropoda
- Subphylum: Chelicerata
- Class: Arachnida
- Order: Araneae
- Infraorder: Araneomorphae
- Family: Stiphidiidae
- Genus: Aorangia; Forster & Wilton, 1973

Type species
- A. ansa Forster & Wilton, 1973

Species
- 16, see text

= Aorangia =

Genus of spiders

Aorangia is a genus of sheetweb spiders first described by Raymond Robert Forster & C. L. Wilton in 1973.

== Species ==
As of April 2019 it contains sixteen species, all found in New Zealand:

- Aorangia agama Forster & Wilton, 1973 – New Zealand
- Aorangia ansa Forster & Wilton, 1973 – New Zealand
- Aorangia fiordensis Forster & Wilton, 1973 – New Zealand
- Aorangia isolata Forster & Wilton, 1973 – New Zealand
- Aorangia kapitiensis Forster & Wilton, 1973 – New Zealand
- Aorangia mauii Forster & Wilton, 1973 – New Zealand
- Aorangia muscicola Forster & Wilton, 1973 – New Zealand
- Aorangia obscura Forster & Wilton, 1973 – New Zealand
- Aorangia otira Forster & Wilton, 1973 – New Zealand
- Aorangia pilgrimi Forster & Wilton, 1973 – New Zealand
- Aorangia poppelwelli Forster & Wilton, 1973 – New Zealand
- Aorangia pudica Forster & Wilton, 1973 – New Zealand
- Aorangia semita Forster & Wilton, 1973 – New Zealand
- Aorangia silvestris Forster & Wilton, 1973 – New Zealand
- Aorangia singularis Forster & Wilton, 1973 – New Zealand
- Aorangia tumida Forster & Wilton, 1973 – New Zealand
