= Aorangia pudica =

Conservation status
- Naturally Uncommon (NZ TCS)

Scientific classification
- Kingdom: Animalia
- Phylum: Arthropoda
- Subphylum: Chelicerata
- Class: Arachnida
- Order: Araneae
- Infraorder: Araneomorphae
- Family: Stiphidiidae
- Genus: Aorangia
- Species: A. pudica

Binomial name
- Aorangia pudica Forster & Wilton, 1973

Species of spider

Aorangia pudica is a species of Stiphidiidae that is endemic to New Zealand.

== Taxonomy ==
This species was described by Ray Forster and Cecil Wilton in 1973 from male and female specimens. The holotype is stored in Otago Museum.

== Description ==
The male is recorded at 4.00mm in length whereas the female is 5.10mm. The carapace is coloured pale cream. The dorsal surface of the abdomen is black.

== Distribution ==
This species is only known from Stewart Island, New Zealand.

== Conservation status ==
Under the New Zealand Threat Classification System, this species is listed as "Naturally Uncommon" with the qualifier of "Data Poor: Size" and "Data Poor: Trend".
