= Pseudauximus pallidus =

Conservation status
- Least Concern (SANBI Red List)

Scientific classification
- Kingdom: Animalia
- Phylum: Arthropoda
- Subphylum: Chelicerata
- Class: Arachnida
- Order: Araneae
- Infraorder: Araneomorphae
- Family: Macrobunidae
- Genus: Pseudauximus
- Species: P. pallidus

Binomial name
- Pseudauximus pallidus Purcell, 1904

Species of spider

Pseudauximus pallidus is a species of spider in the genus Pseudauximus. It occurs across three provinces of South Africa, including the Northern Cape, Western Cape, and Eastern Cape.

== Distribution ==
Pseudauximus pallidus has a relatively wide distribution across South Africa. It has been recorded from Hanover in the Northern Cape, several localities in the Western Cape including Swartberg Nature Reserve, Cape Town, Bontebok National Park, Laingsburg, Anysberg Nature Reserve, and Matjiesfontein, and from Addo Elephant National Park in the Eastern Cape.

== Habitat ==
This ground-dwelling spider has been collected in pitfall traps from the Fynbos and Nama Karoo biomes at elevations ranging from 9 to 1358 meters above sea level.

== Description ==
Pseudauximus pallidus is known from both males and females. The species exhibits the typical characteristics of the genus, including the yellow coloration with white reticulation and the fairly long legs.

== Conservation ==
Pseudauximus pallidus is listed as Least Concern due to its wide geographical range across three provinces. The species is protected in three conservation areas: Swartberg Nature Reserve, Bontebok National Park, and Anysberg Nature Reserve. There are no significant threats to the species.
