= Chumma gastroperforata =

Conservation status
- Least Concern (SANBI Red List)

Scientific classification
- Kingdom: Animalia
- Phylum: Arthropoda
- Subphylum: Chelicerata
- Class: Arachnida
- Order: Araneae
- Infraorder: Araneomorphae
- Family: Macrobunidae
- Genus: Chumma
- Species: C. gastroperforata

Binomial name
- Chumma gastroperforata Jocqué, 2001

Species of spider

Chumma gastroperforata is a species of spider in the genus Chumma. It is endemic to South Africa, occurring in both the Eastern Cape and Western Cape provinces.

== Distribution ==
Chumma gastroperforata has been recorded from several localities across two provinces: in the Eastern Cape at Tsitsikamma National Park, and in the Western Cape at Diepwalle Forest Station, Gondwana Game Reserve, Humansdorp Witelsbos, and Prince Albert.

== Habitat ==
This species is a free-living hunter frequently collected from pitfall traps. It has been sampled from the Forest and Fynbos biomes at elevations ranging from 284 to 1,003 meters above sea level.

== Description ==
Chumma gastroperforata is known from both sexes. The species exhibits the typical characteristics of the genus, including the distinctive structural dorsal scutum and spiny appearance.

== Conservation ==
Chumma gastroperforata is listed as Least Concern. The species is known from two provinces and is protected in Tsitsikamma National Park, Gondwana Game Reserve, and Diepwalle Forest Station. There are no known threats to the species.
