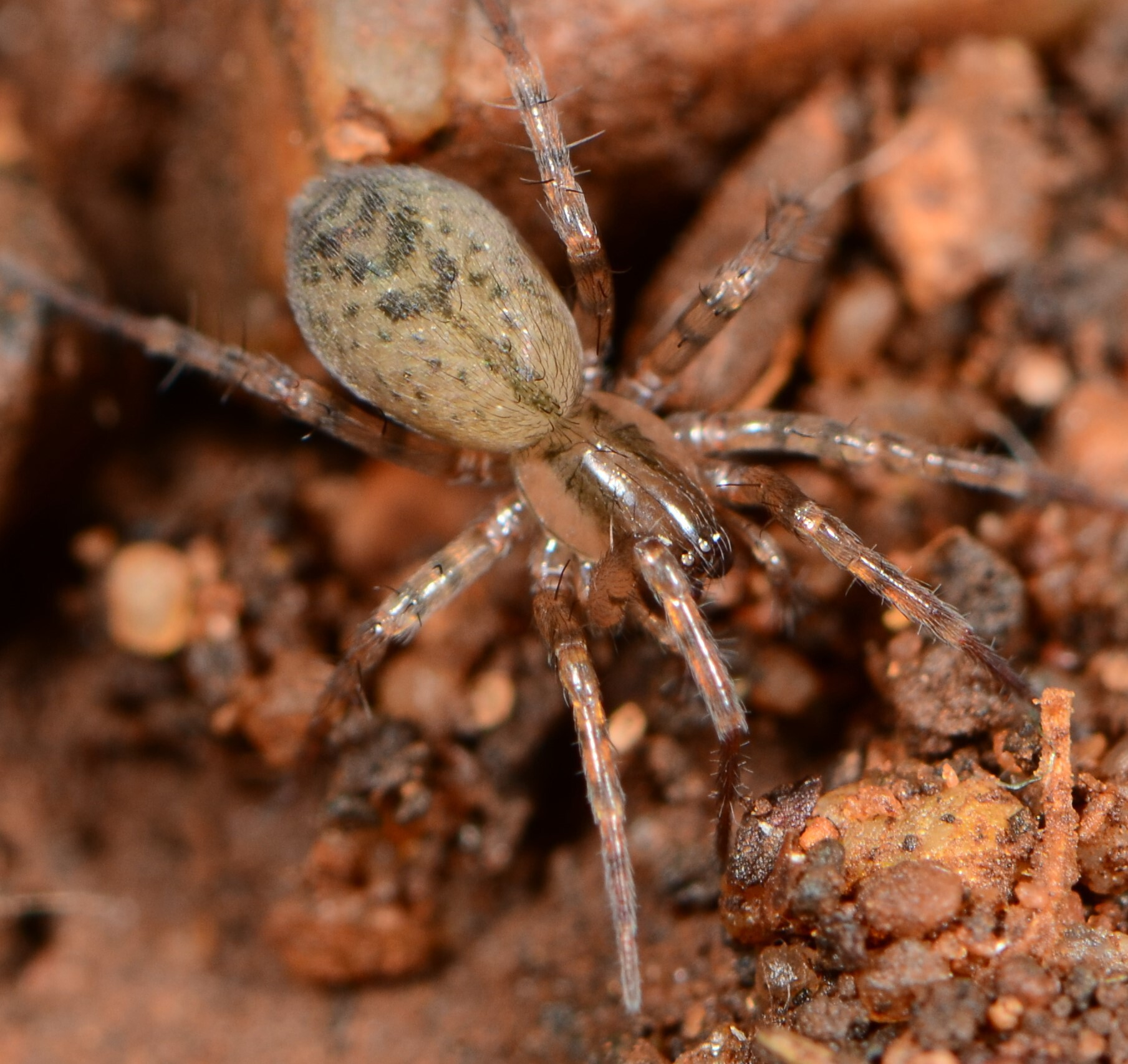
- Female
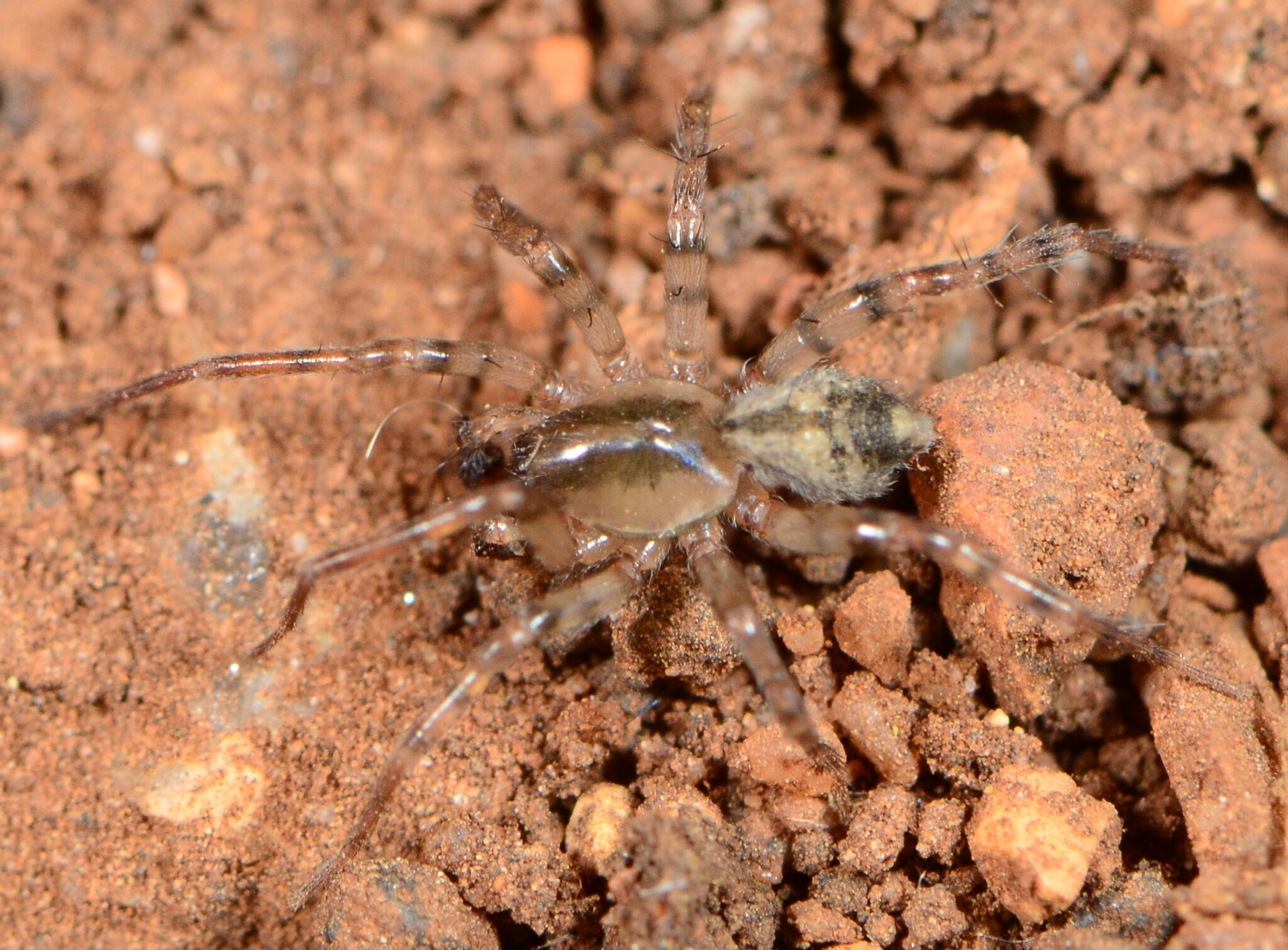
- Male

Scientific classification
- Kingdom: Animalia
- Phylum: Arthropoda
- Subphylum: Chelicerata
- Class: Arachnida
- Order: Araneae
- Infraorder: Araneomorphae
- Family: Macrobunidae
- Genus: Chresiona
- Species: C. invalida

Binomial name
- Chresiona invalida (Simon, 1898)

= Chresiona invalida =

Species of spider

Chresiona invalida is a species of spider of the genus Chresiona. It occurs in South Africa and Lesotho.

== Taxonomy ==
The species was originally described in 1898 as Cybaeus invalidus by Eugène Simon based on a female specimen from Pretoria. It was later transferred to the genus Chresiona by Pekka T. Lehtinen in 1967.

== Distribution ==
Chresiona invalida has a wide distribution across southern Africa. In South Africa, it has been recorded from five provinces: Eastern Cape (Addo National Park), Free State (Wyndford farm, Fouriesburg), Gauteng (Pretoria National Botanical Garden), KwaZulu-Natal (Sani Pass), Limpopo (Blouberg Nature Reserve, Little Leigh), Mpumalanga (Ohrigstad), and Western Cape (Elgin, Greater Simonsberg Conservancy, Table Mountain National Park). It also occurs in Lesotho.

== Habitat ==
Chresiona invalida has been sampled from pitfall traps and by beating low vegetation. In the Free State, the species has been collected during the day from plants. It inhabits the Fynbos, Grassland, and Savanna biomes.

== Description ==
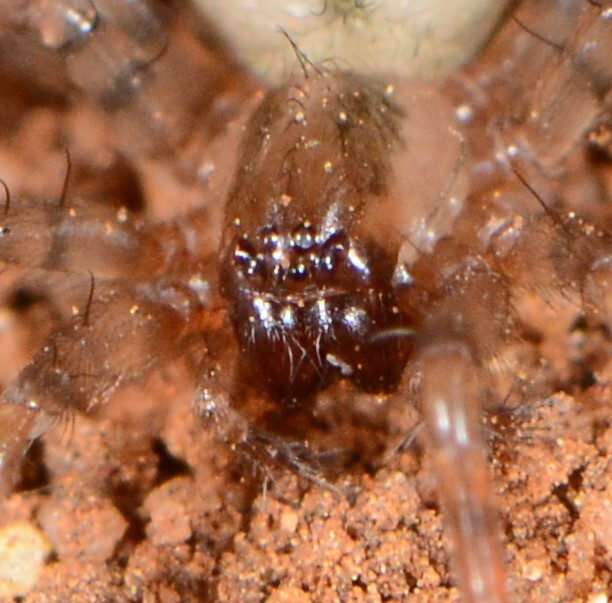
closeup of female

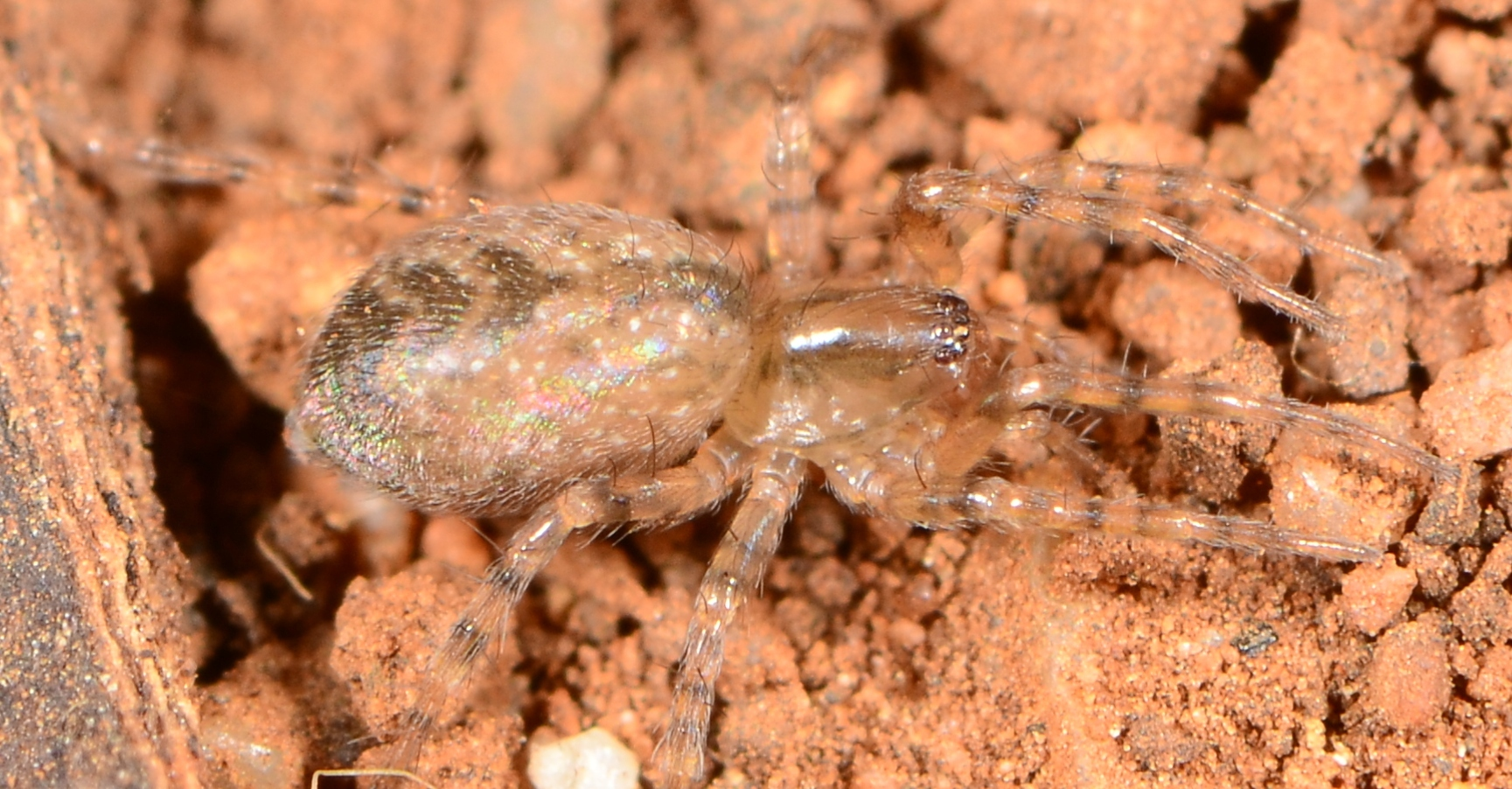
female

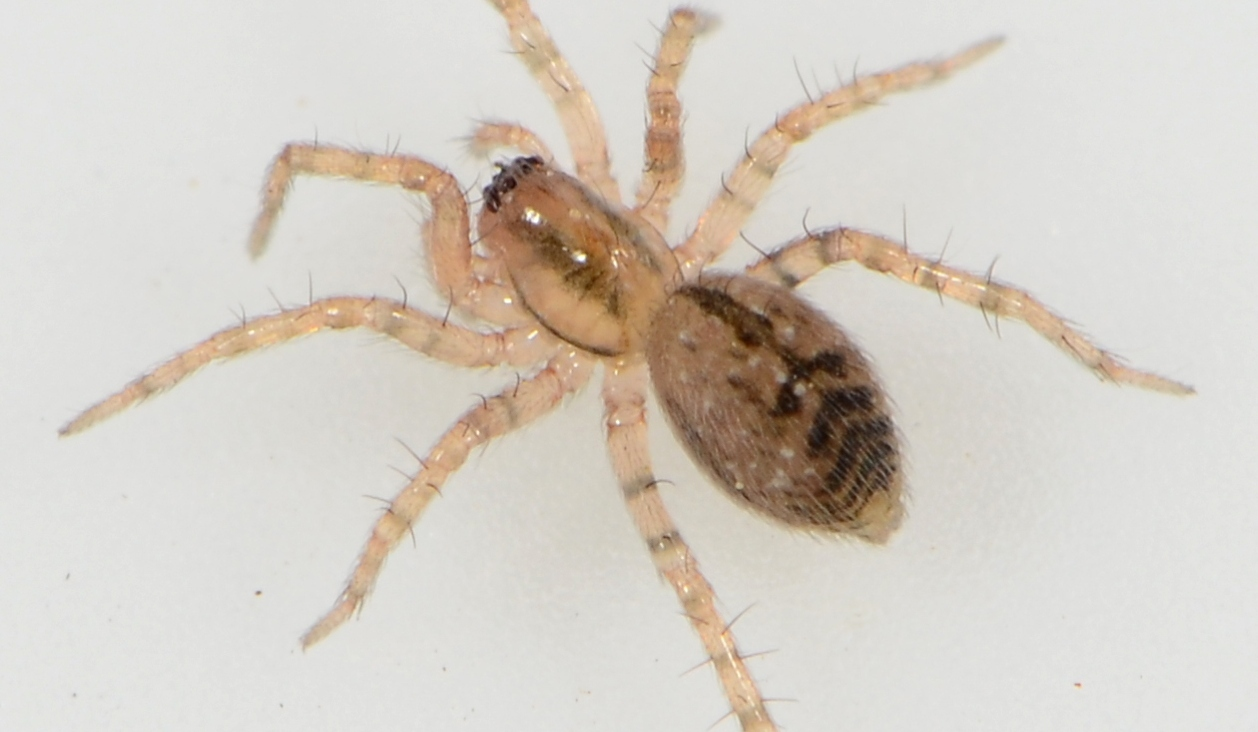
female

== Conservation ==
Chresiona invalida is listed as Least Concern due to its wide geographical range across southern Africa. The species is protected in several conservation areas including Addo National Park, Blouberg Nature Reserve, Pretoria National Botanical Garden, Table Mountain National Park, and Simonsberg Conservancy.
