= Naevius =

Naevius may refer to:

- Gnaeus Naevius, Roman poet and dramatist
- Naevius (spider), a genus of spiders
- Naevius Sutorius Macro, confidant of Roman emperors Tiberius and Caligula

== See also ==
- Naevia gens
- The Porta Naevia was a gate in the Servian Wall on the Aventine Hill of Rome
