= Chumma foliata =

Scientific classification
- Kingdom: Animalia
- Phylum: Arthropoda
- Subphylum: Chelicerata
- Class: Arachnida
- Order: Araneae
- Infraorder: Araneomorphae
- Family: Macrobunidae
- Genus: Chumma
- Species: C. foliata

Binomial name
- Chumma foliata Jocqué & Alderweireldt, 2018

Species of spider

Chumma foliata is a species of spider in the genus Chumma. It is endemic to the Eastern Cape province of South Africa.

== Distribution ==
Chumma foliata is found in the Amatola Mountains near Hogsback in the Eastern Cape province of South Africa.

== Habitat ==
This species is a free-living hunter that was sampled in high numbers by hand from grass tussocks in alpine Grassland and Fynbos biomes at an elevation of 1272 meters above sea level.

== Description ==
Chumma foliata is known from both males and females. Like other members of the genus, it has the characteristic flat carapace and spiny-backed appearance with a structural dorsal scutum.

== Conservation ==
Chumma foliata is listed as Data Deficient. The species is known from 16 specimens collected from a restricted area around the type locality. More sampling is needed to determine the species' full range and conservation status.
