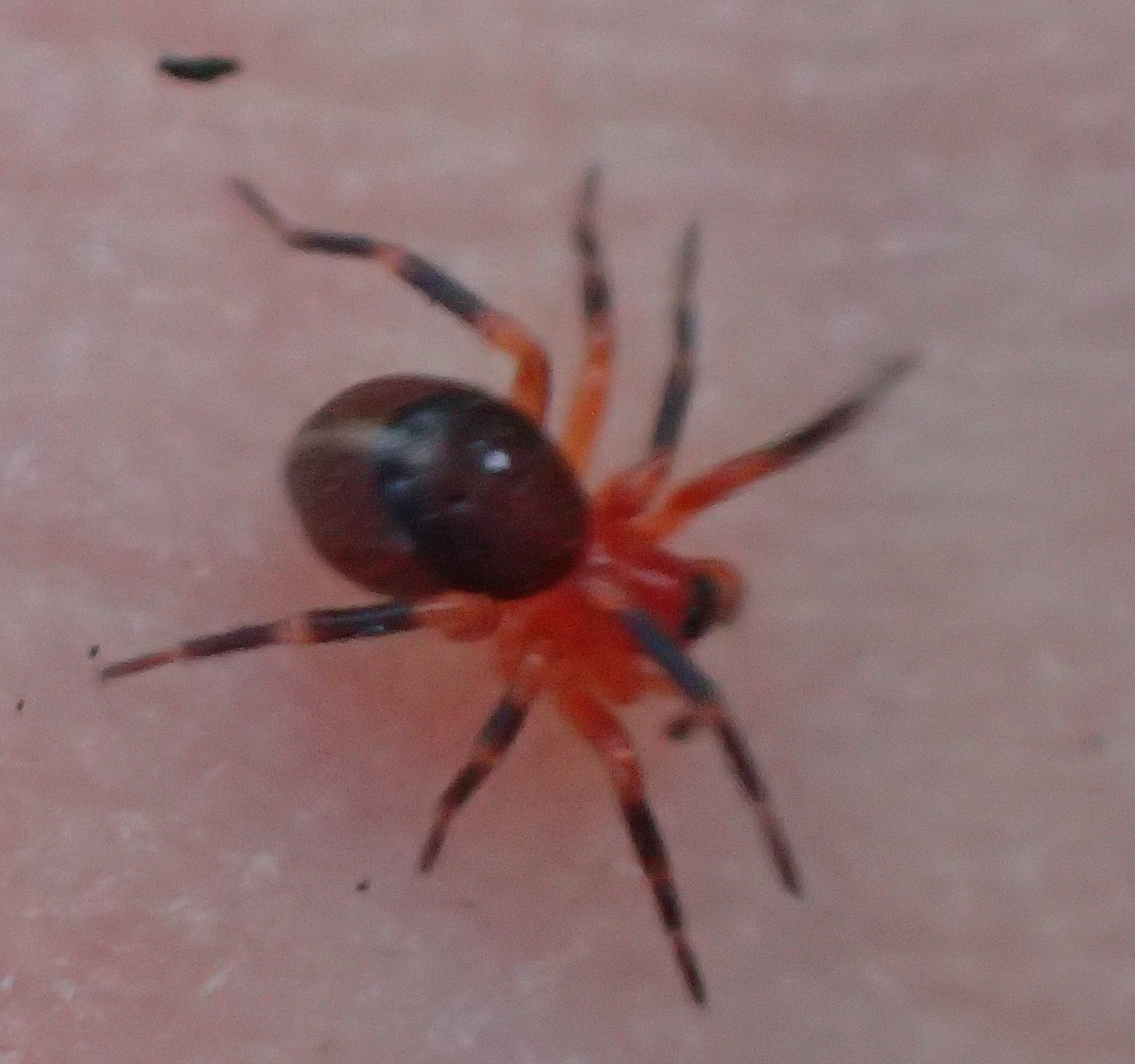
- C. inquieta
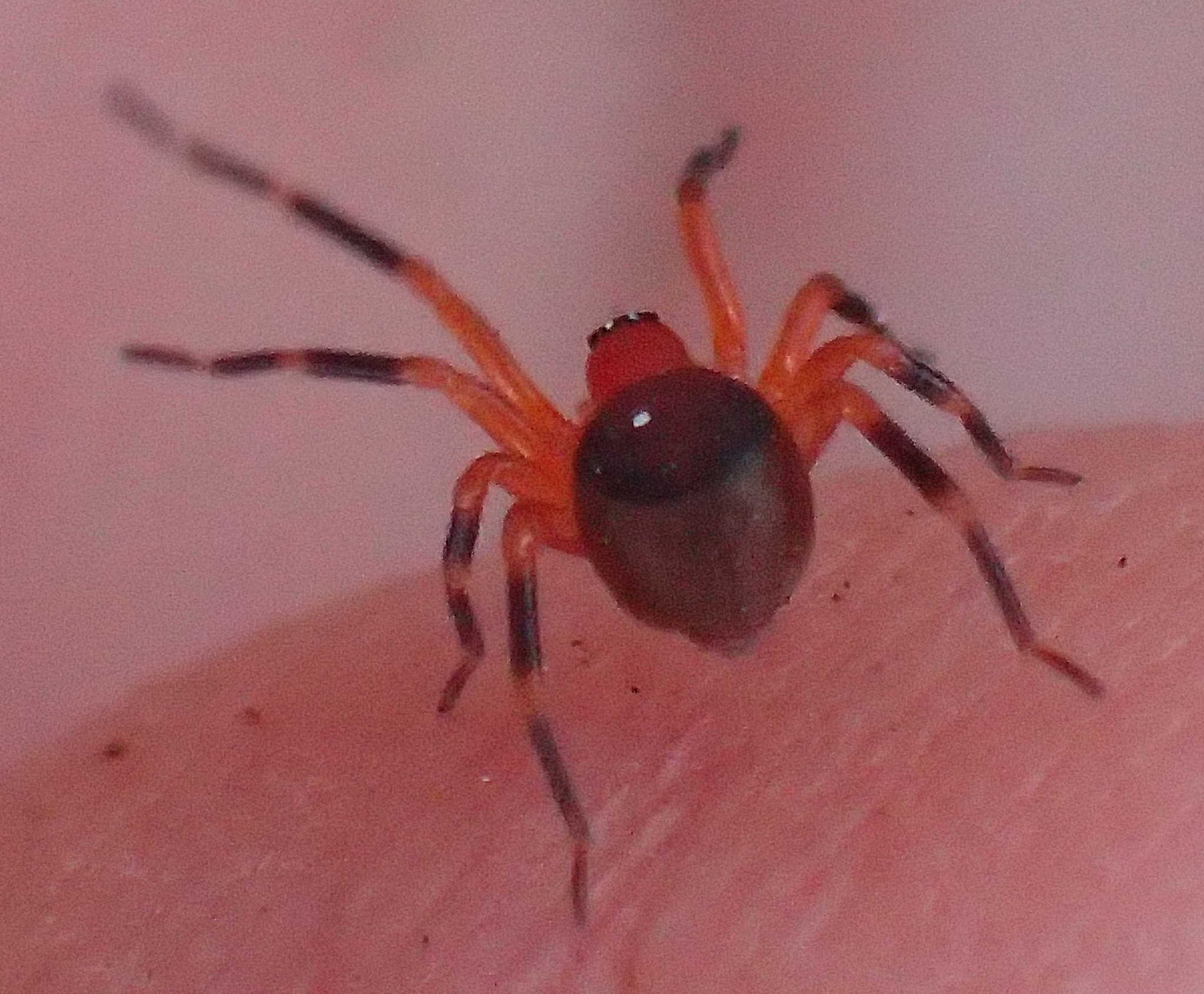

Conservation status
- Endangered (SANBI Red List)

Scientific classification
- Kingdom: Animalia
- Phylum: Arthropoda
- Subphylum: Chelicerata
- Class: Arachnida
- Order: Araneae
- Infraorder: Araneomorphae
- Family: Macrobunidae
- Genus: Chumma
- Species: C. inquieta

Binomial name
- Chumma inquieta Jocqué, 2001

= Chumma inquieta =

Species of spider

Chumma inquieta is a species of spider in the genus Chumma and the type species of the genus. It is endemic to South Africa, occurring in both the Eastern Cape and Western Cape provinces.

== Distribution ==
Chumma inquieta is known from four locations across two provinces: in the Eastern Cape at Addo National Park, Andries Vosloo Kudu Reserve, and Colchester Pearson Park Nature and Pleasure Resort; and in the Western Cape at Plettenberg Bay.

== Habitat ==
This free-living ground spider has been collected in leaf litter. Some specimens were sampled from back dunes in the litter of Searsea crenata in the Thicket and Fynbos biomes.

== Description ==
Chumma inquieta is known from both males and females. As the type species of Chumma, it exhibits all the characteristic features of the genus, including the flat oval carapace, structural dorsal scutum, and distinctive spiny appearance.

== Conservation ==
Chumma inquieta is listed as Endangered. Known from between five and ten locations, this species is declining due to ongoing loss of its coastal habitat to housing developments. The species is protected in Addo National Park and Andries Vosloo Kudu Reserve, but the location at Plettenberg Bay is likely to have been lost to coastal development.
