= Chumma striata =

Conservation status
- Least Concern (IUCN 3.1)

Scientific classification
- Kingdom: Animalia
- Phylum: Arthropoda
- Subphylum: Chelicerata
- Class: Arachnida
- Order: Araneae
- Infraorder: Araneomorphae
- Family: Macrobunidae
- Genus: Chumma
- Species: C. striata

Binomial name
- Chumma striata Jocqué & Alderweireldt, 2018

Species of spider

Chumma striata, commonly known as the striped spiny-backed spider, is a species of spider in the genus Chumma. It is endemic to the Western Cape province of South Africa.

== Distribution ==
Chumma striata is found at three sites in the Western Cape: Prince Albert Rosendal Farm, George at Saasveld Forestry Station, and 10 km east of George at Silver River. This small spider lives exclusively in the temperate climate zones of the country's southern regions. Sightings are concentrated in specific areas: the Western Cape province (the primary region where the species is known to occur).

== Habitat ==
This species is a free-living hunter that has been sampled by sifting litter and from pitfall traps. It inhabits the Forest and Fynbos biomes at elevations ranging from 232 to 878 meters above sea level.

== Description ==
Chumma striata is known from both sexes. The species name refers to its striped appearance, and it exhibits the characteristic features of the genus including the flat oval carapace and structural dorsal scutum.

== Conservation ==
Chumma striata is classified as Least Concern by the IUCN, although it is rare. The species has a small, restricted distribution range of less than 500 km^{2}. It is protected in the Saasveld Forestry Station, but more sampling is needed to determine the full extent of its range.
