= Chumma interfluvialis =

Scientific classification
- Kingdom: Animalia
- Phylum: Arthropoda
- Subphylum: Chelicerata
- Class: Arachnida
- Order: Araneae
- Infraorder: Araneomorphae
- Family: Macrobunidae
- Genus: Chumma
- Species: C. interfluvialis

Binomial name
- Chumma interfluvialis Jocqué & Alderweireldt, 2018

Species of spider

Chumma interfluvialis is a species of spider in the genus Chumma. It is endemic to the Free State province of South Africa.

== Distribution ==
Chumma interfluvialis is known only from the Tussen-die-Riviere Nature Reserve on the banks of the Orange River in the Free State province.

== Habitat ==
This species is a free-living hunter that was sampled while sifting leaf litter in Vachellia karroo riparian woodland on the banks of the Orange River in the Grassland biome at an elevation of 1235 meters above sea level.

== Description ==
Chumma interfluvialis is known from both males and females. The species exhibits the characteristic features of the genus Chumma, including the flat oval carapace and structural dorsal scutum.

== Conservation ==
Chumma interfluvialis is listed as Data Deficient. The species is known only from eight specimens collected from the type locality. The species is protected within the Tussen-die-Riviere Nature Reserve, but more sampling is needed to determine the species' full range.
