= Livius =

Livius may refer to:

- Marcus Livius Drusus Claudianus, a Roman senator opposing the autocracy of Augustus
- Livius, a genus of spiders with the sole species Livius macrospinus
- Livy, Latin name Titus Livius, a Roman historian
- Livius.org, a website on ancient history
