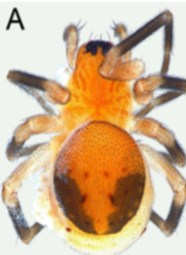
- Adult female, dorsal habitus

Scientific classification
- Kingdom: Animalia
- Phylum: Arthropoda
- Subphylum: Chelicerata
- Class: Arachnida
- Order: Araneae
- Infraorder: Araneomorphae
- Family: Macrobunidae
- Genus: Chumma
- Species: C. bicolor

Binomial name
- Chumma bicolor Jocqué & Alderweireldt, 2018

= Chumma bicolor =

Species of spider

Chumma bicolor, also known as the Goukamma spiny-backed spider, is a species of spider in the genus Chumma. It is endemic to the Western Cape province of South Africa.

== Distribution ==
Chumma bicolor is known only from Goukamma in the Western Cape, where it was first described in 2018.

== Habitat ==
This species is a free-living hunter that was sampled by beating fynbos shrubs. The types were recorded from the Goukamma Nature Reserve.

== Description ==
Chumma bicolor exhibits the characteristic features of the genus Chumma, including the flat oval carapace and structural dorsal scutum on the opisthosoma.

Chumma species are small spiders with a flat, oval carapace that is widest at the second coxae and strongly narrowed in front, eight eyes in two rows, and no thoracic groove. The fairly flat abdomen carries a well-developed dorsal scutum in both sexes; the front of the scutum bears a field of stiff bristles set in large sockets, a feature reflected in the group's common name, the spiny-backed spiders. Females have six spinnerets, and the short legs (leg formula 4123) end in three tarsal claws. The epigyne is simple, with a central depression flanked by a strongly reticulated protrusion on each side. Chumma bicolor is known only from female specimens.

== Conservation ==
Chumma bicolor is listed as Data Deficient for taxonomic reasons. The species is currently known only from female specimens from the type locality. More sampling is needed to collect males and determine the species' range.
