= Chresiona nigrosignata =

Scientific classification
- Kingdom: Animalia
- Phylum: Arthropoda
- Subphylum: Chelicerata
- Class: Arachnida
- Order: Araneae
- Infraorder: Araneomorphae
- Family: Macrobunidae
- Genus: Chresiona
- Species: C. nigrosignata

Binomial name
- Chresiona nigrosignata Simon, 1903

Synonyms
- Chresiona albescens Simon, 1903

Species of spider

Chresiona nigrosignata is a species of spider of the genus Chresiona and the type species of the genus. It is endemic to South Africa.

== Distribution ==
Chresiona nigrosignata is found in the Western Cape province of South Africa. The original type locality was given only as "Bonae Spei" (Cape of Good Hope). It has been recorded from Table Mountain National Park.

== Description ==
As the type species of the genus, Chresiona nigrosignata exhibits the characteristic features of Chresiona.

== Conservation ==
Chresiona nigrosignata is listed as Data Deficient for taxonomic reasons. The species is known only from the female, with the original description lacking sufficient detail for correct identification. The species is protected in Table Mountain National Park, but more sampling is needed to collect males and determine the species' range.
