= Chumma subridens =

Scientific classification
- Kingdom: Animalia
- Phylum: Arthropoda
- Subphylum: Chelicerata
- Class: Arachnida
- Order: Araneae
- Infraorder: Araneomorphae
- Family: Macrobunidae
- Genus: Chumma
- Species: C. subridens

Binomial name
- Chumma subridens Jocqué & Alderweireldt, 2018

Species of spider

Chumma subridens is a species of spider in the genus Chumma. It occurs in both the Eastern Cape and Western Cape provinces of South Africa.

== Distribution ==
Chumma subridens has been recorded from two widely separated locations: Fort Fordyce Nature Reserve in the Eastern Cape, and Table Mountain National Park including Signal Hill in the Western Cape.

== Habitat ==
This species is a free-living hunter that has been sampled by sifting leaf litter in Afrotemperate forest and shrubland in the Fynbos biome at elevations ranging from 9 to 845 meters above sea level.

== Description ==
Chumma subridens is known from both males and females. Like other members of the genus, it has the characteristic flat carapace and spiny-backed appearance with a structural dorsal scutum.

== Conservation ==
Chumma subridens is listed as Data Deficient. The species is known from only six specimens collected from two widely separated locations. It is protected in both Fort Fordyce Nature Reserve and Table Mountain National Park, but more sampling is required to determine the species' full range.
