= Neoporteria =

Neoporteria may refer to:

- the cactus genus Eriosyce
- the Amaurobiidae spider genus Neoporteria (spider)
