= Obatala armata =

Scientific classification
- Kingdom: Animalia
- Phylum: Arthropoda
- Subphylum: Chelicerata
- Class: Arachnida
- Order: Araneae
- Infraorder: Araneomorphae
- Family: Macrobunidae
- Genus: Obatala; Lehtinen, 1967
- Species: O. armata

Binomial name
- Obatala armata Lehtinen, 1967

Monotypic genus of spiders

Obatala armata is the single described species of Obatala, a monotypic genus of spiders in the family Macrobunidae, known as hackled mesh-web weavers. It is endemic to the Western Cape province of South Africa.

== Description ==
Obatala armata has a total body size of 3-5 mm. The carapace is pale yellowish with a dark border around the high cephalic region. The fovea is long, narrow, and dark. The anterior median eyes are smaller than the posterior median eyes. The chelicerae bear five to seven teeth, and the labium is as wide as it is long.

The opisthosoma displays white markings, and the cribellum is undivided. The legs are faintly banded. Females have an epigyne with a caudal arched plate.

== Distribution ==
Obatala armata is found in the Cederberg region of the Western Cape. It has been recorded from the Cederberg Wilderness Area, Niewoudt's Pass, Mamre, and Clanwilliam.

== Habitat ==
This ground-dwelling species inhabits the Fynbos biome and has been sampled from pitfall traps at elevations ranging from 78 to 600 meters above sea level.

== Ecology and behavior ==
Little is known about the behavior of Obatala armata. They are ground dwellers that are typically sampled from pitfall traps and inhabit the Fynbos biome.

== Conservation ==
Obatala armata is listed as Data Deficient for taxonomic reasons. The species is known only from female specimens collected from three localities. It is protected in the Cederberg Wilderness Area, but more sampling is needed to collect males and determine the full range of the species.
