= Chumma tsitsikamma =

Scientific classification
- Kingdom: Animalia
- Phylum: Arthropoda
- Subphylum: Chelicerata
- Class: Arachnida
- Order: Araneae
- Infraorder: Araneomorphae
- Family: Macrobunidae
- Genus: Chumma
- Species: C. tsitsikamma

Binomial name
- Chumma tsitsikamma Jocqué & Alderweireldt, 2018

Species of spider

Chumma tsitsikamma is a species of spider in the genus Chumma. It is endemic to the Eastern Cape province of South Africa.

== Distribution ==
Chumma tsitsikamma is known only from Tsitsikamma National Park in the Eastern Cape province, from which it takes its name.

== Habitat ==
This species is a free-living hunter that was sampled from leaf litter in high moisture coastal forest in the Forest biome at an elevation of 230 meters above sea level.

== Description ==
Chumma tsitsikamma is currently known only from male specimens. The species exhibits the characteristic features of the genus Chumma, including the flat oval carapace typical of the group.

== Conservation ==
Chumma tsitsikamma is listed as Data Deficient for taxonomic reasons. The species is known only from four male specimens collected at the type locality. The species is protected within Tsitsikamma National Park, but more sampling is needed to collect females and determine the species' range.
