= Pseudauximus annulatus =

Scientific classification
- Kingdom: Animalia
- Phylum: Arthropoda
- Subphylum: Chelicerata
- Class: Arachnida
- Order: Araneae
- Infraorder: Araneomorphae
- Family: Macrobunidae
- Genus: Pseudauximus
- Species: P. annulatus

Binomial name
- Pseudauximus annulatus Purcell, 1908

Species of spider

Pseudauximus annulatus is a species of spider in the genus Pseudauximus. It occurs in South Africa in the Limpopo and Northern Cape provinces.

== Distribution ==
Pseudauximus annulatus has been recorded from Lhuvhondo Nature Reserve in Limpopo province and from Little Namaqualand in the Northern Cape province.

== Habitat ==
This ground-dwelling species has been sampled from pitfall traps in the Savanna and Succulent Karoo biomes at elevations ranging from 231 to 1341 meters above sea level.

== Description ==
Pseudauximus annulatus exhibits the characteristic features of the genus, including the distinctive yellow coloration with white reticulation and the fairly long legs typical of males in this genus.

== Conservation ==
Pseudauximus annulatus is listed as Data Deficient for taxonomic reasons. The species is known only from male specimens, and identification remains problematic. The species is protected in Lhuvhondo Nature Reserve, but more sampling is needed to collect females and determine the species' range.
