= Pseudauximus reticulatus =

Scientific classification
- Kingdom: Animalia
- Phylum: Arthropoda
- Subphylum: Chelicerata
- Class: Arachnida
- Order: Araneae
- Infraorder: Araneomorphae
- Family: Macrobunidae
- Genus: Pseudauximus
- Species: P. reticulatus

Binomial name
- Pseudauximus reticulatus Simon, 1902

Species of spider

Pseudauximus reticulatus is a species of spider in the genus Pseudauximus and the type species of the genus. It is endemic to the Western Cape province of South Africa.

== Distribution ==
Pseudauximus reticulatus is found in the Western Cape province. The original type locality was given only as "Bonae Spei" (Cape of Good Hope). In more recent years, it has been recorded from Robben Island, Cape Town, and Table Mountain National Park.

== Habitat ==
This species is a free-running ground dweller that inhabits the Fynbos biome at elevations ranging from 7 to 9 meters above sea level.

== Description ==
As the type species of the genus, Pseudauximus reticulatus exhibits all the characteristic features of Pseudauximus, including the yellow opisthosoma with white reticulation shining through the integument that gives the species its name.

== Conservation ==
Pseudauximus reticulatus is listed as Data Deficient. The species is known only from female specimens, with males still undescribed despite drawings of the male palp being provided by Lehtinen (1967). The species is currently protected in Table Mountain National Park, but urbanization and fire may affect local populations. More sampling is needed to collect males and determine the species' range.
