= Chresiona convexa =

Scientific classification
- Kingdom: Animalia
- Phylum: Arthropoda
- Subphylum: Chelicerata
- Class: Arachnida
- Order: Araneae
- Infraorder: Araneomorphae
- Family: Macrobunidae
- Genus: Chresiona
- Species: C. convexa

Binomial name
- Chresiona convexa Simon, 1903

Synonyms
- Chresiona quadrilineata Simon, 1903

Species of spider

Chresiona convexa is a species of spider of the genus Chresiona. It is endemic to South Africa.

== Distribution ==
Chresiona convexa is found in the Western Cape province of South Africa. It has been recorded from Table Mountain National Park.

== Description ==
The species exhibits the typical characteristics of the genus Chresiona, with a total body size of 3-5 mm. The species shows the distinctive pale brown carapace with darker bands characteristic of the genus.

== Conservation ==
Chresiona convexa is listed as Data Deficient for taxonomic reasons. Identification of this species is problematic as the original description lacks sufficient detail for correct identification. More sampling is needed to collect both sexes and determine the species' range.
