= Teeatta =

Scientific classification
- Domain: Eukaryota
- Kingdom: Animalia
- Phylum: Arthropoda
- Subphylum: Chelicerata
- Class: Arachnida
- Order: Araneae
- Infraorder: Araneomorphae
- Family: Macrobunidae
- Genus: Teeatta; Davies, 2005

Type species
- T. driesseni Davies, 2005

Species
- T. driesseni Davies, 2005 – Australia (Tasmania); T. magna Davies, 2005 – Australia (Tasmania); T. platnicki Davies, 2005 – Australia (Tasmania)

Genus of spiders

Teeatta is a genus of Australian spiders in the family Macrobunidae first described by V. T. Davies in 2005. As of April 2019 it contains only three species.
