= Funny (spider) =

Scientific classification
- Kingdom: Animalia
- Phylum: Arthropoda
- Subphylum: Chelicerata
- Class: Arachnida
- Order: Araneae
- Infraorder: Araneomorphae
- Family: Macrobunidae
- Genus: Funny; Lin & Li, 2022

Type species
- Funny valentine Lin & Li, 2022

Species
- Funny valentine Lin & Li, 2022; Funny yanqing Lin & Li, 2024

Genus of spider

Funny is a genus of macrobunid spiders from China comprising two species, Funny valentine (the type species) and Funny yanqing.

== Etymology ==
The specific name of Funny valentine was described as "an arbitrary combination of letters" by its authors. However, it was later described as a reference to the character of the same name from JoJo's Bizarre Adventure. Funny yanqing was named after Water Margin character Yan Qing.

== Description ==
Funny valentine measures around 2 millimetres (0.079 in) in body length. It possesses six eyes, with the anterior eye row being recurved. The oval-shaped cephalothorax and legs are pale yellow, while the abdomen is white. The body is sparsely covered in dark setae. The two species are united in pedipalp morphology by the branching of the retrolateral tibial apophysis. However, the shape of the retro-proximal cymbial process, dorsal tibial apophysis and tegular apophysis differ in males between the two species. Females of F. yanqing also have a septum separating the copulatory openings, which are touching in F. valentine.

== Taxonomy ==
The genus Funny was originally described as part of the family Dictynidae. A 2023 study later moved it to the family Macrobunidae, which was elevated from its former rank of subfamily, as part of a phylogenetic reevaluation of "marronoid" spider taxonomy. A second species, Funny yanqing, was described in 2024.

== Distribution ==
Funny valentine is only known from its type locality of Kangding in Sichuan, China. The holotype and paratypes were found under moss. The holotype and paratypes of Funny yanqing were found in Bayi Town, Tibet, China, also in moss.

== See also ==
- List of organisms named after works of fiction
