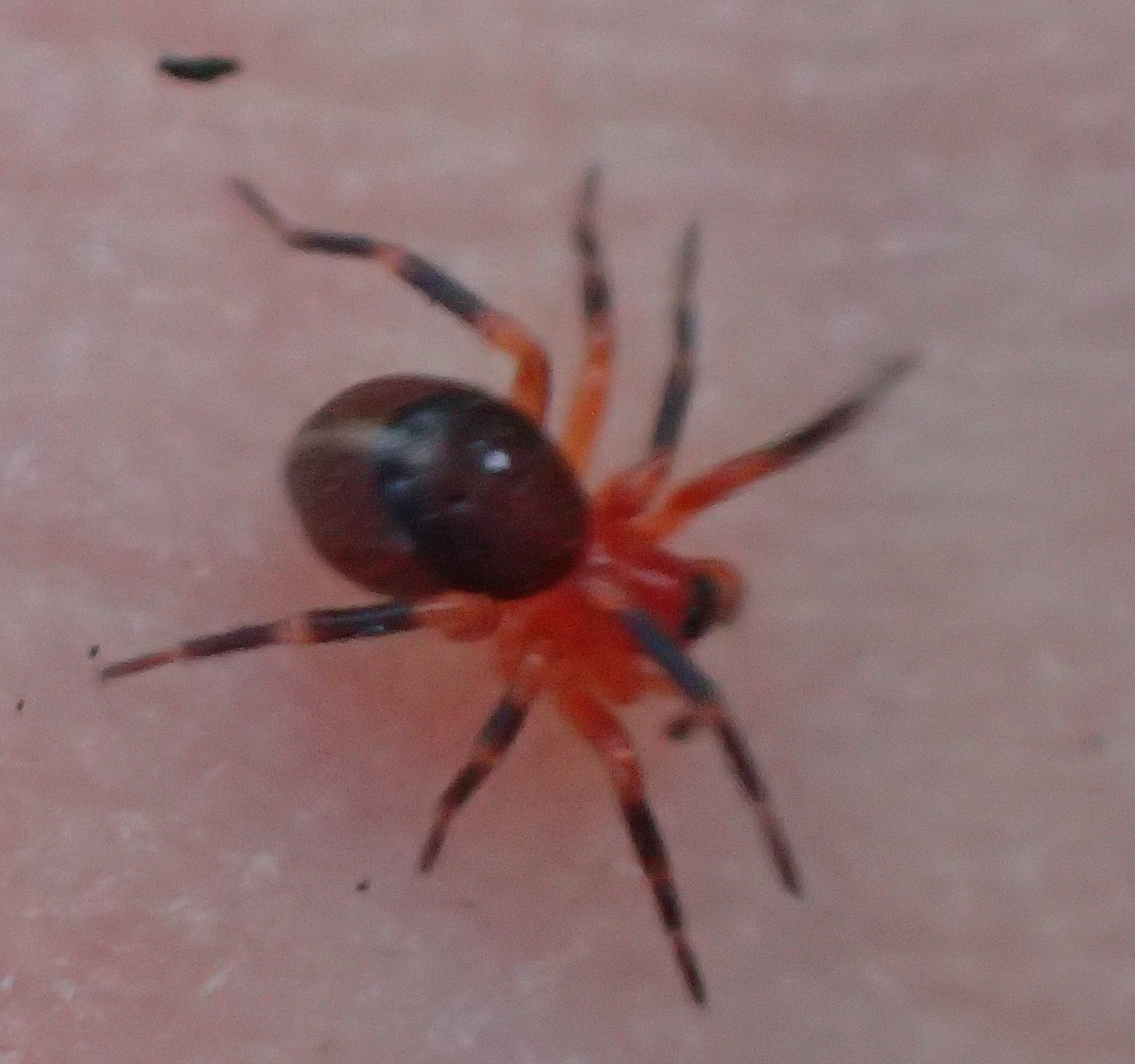
- C. inquieta
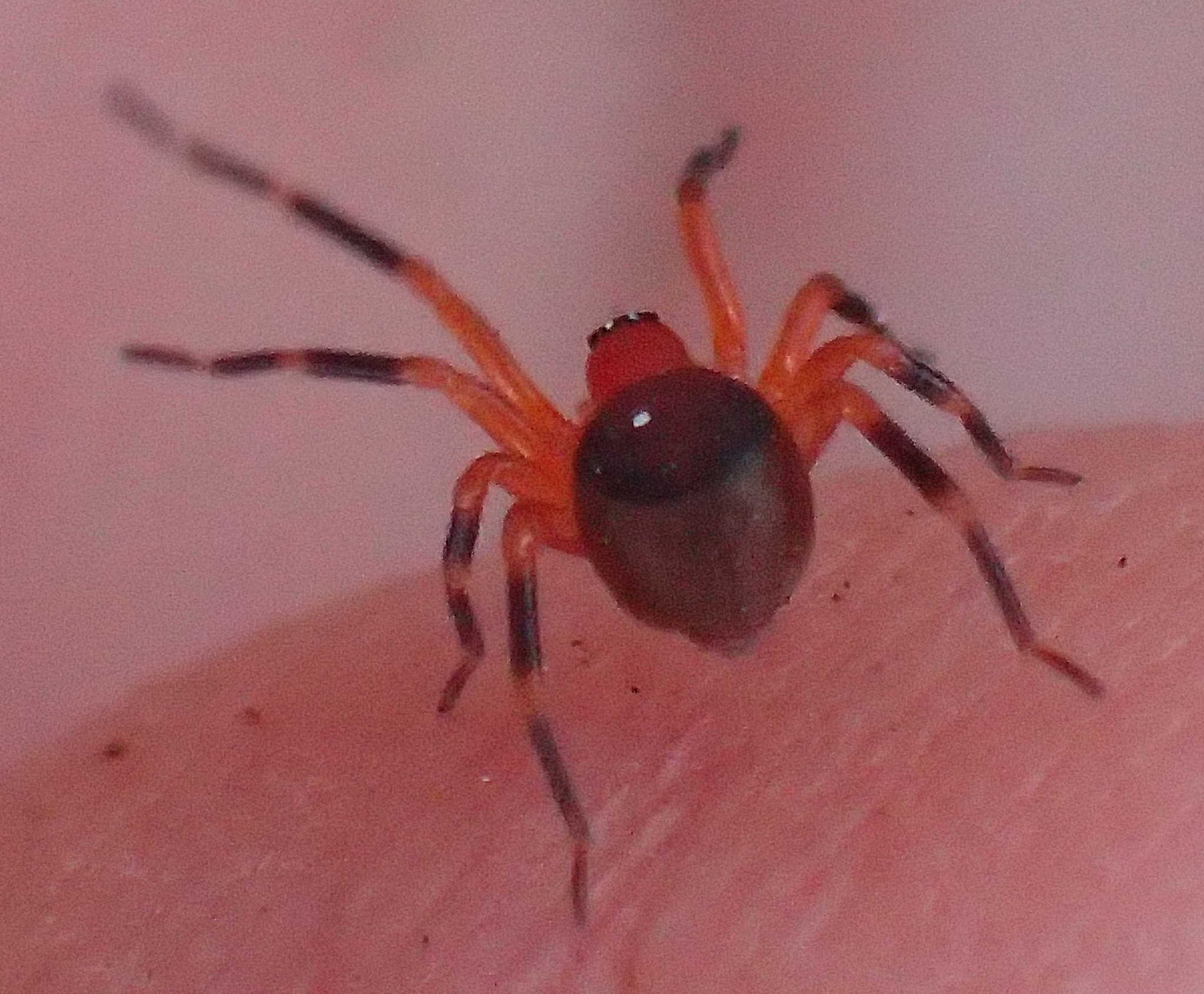

Scientific classification
- Kingdom: Animalia
- Phylum: Arthropoda
- Subphylum: Chelicerata
- Class: Arachnida
- Order: Araneae
- Infraorder: Araneomorphae
- Family: Macrobunidae
- Genus: Chumma; Jocqué, 2001

Type species
- Chumma inquieta Jocqué, 2001

Diversity
- 10 species
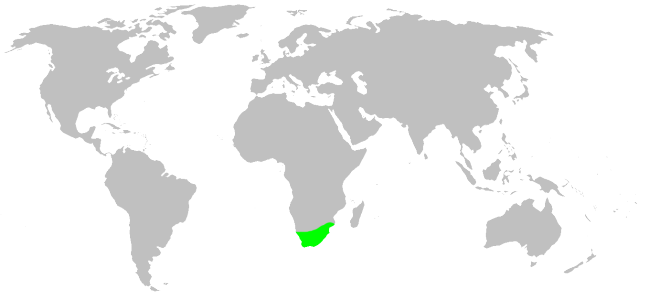

= Chumma =

Genus of spiders

Chumma is a genus of spiders commonly known as spiny-backed spiders. All species in the genus are endemic to South Africa.

== Taxonomy ==
The genus Chumma was originally described by Rudy Jocqué in 2001, who established it as the type genus of the family Chummidae. The genus was later transferred from Chummidae to Amaurobiidae by Wheeler et al. (2017), though this transfer was not accepted by Jocqué & Alderweireldt (2018). More recently, it has been transferred to the Macrobunidae by Gorneau et al. (2023).

== Description ==
Chumma spiders have a distinctive morphology that sets them apart from other spider genera. The carapace is flat and oval, being widest at the second pair of coxae and strongly narrowed at the front. The cephalic region is well separated by a cervical groove, and there is no fovea. They have eight eyes arranged in two rows, and strong chelicerae.

The sternum is as long as it is wide, with a posterior point protruding between the fourth pair of coxae. The opisthosoma is fairly flat with a well-developed structural dorsal scutum in both sexes. The front of the abdomen features a field of stiff macrosetae with large sockets, four central sigilla, and several smaller lateral ones. Females have six spinnerets.

The legs are short with a leg formula of 4123 (fourth leg longest, third leg shortest). They have only one or two spines on the femora, or may be spineless. Each leg bears a row of four trichobothria on the tarsi, with one trichobothrium each on the metatarsi and tibiae. All legs end in three tarsal claws.

Male pedipalps have a complex lateral tibial apophysis, while the cymbium shows proximal modifications. The palpal bulb features a large subtegulum and a short, solid embolus that emerges from the distal part of the tegulum. Female epigynes are simple, with a central depression and strong reticulated lateral protrusions on either side.

== Ecology and behavior ==
Chumma spiders are wandering ground dwellers that run freely on the soil surface. During periods of inactivity, these spiders sit upside-down under dead leaves. They have a rapid gait similar to that of wolf spiders (Lycosidae), running for fairly long periods, then stopping before running again.

The species inhabit various South African biomes including Fynbos, Forest, Grassland, and Thicket biomes. They are typically collected from pitfall traps, leaf litter, or by sifting litter and beating vegetation.

== Distribution ==
The distribution of Chumma is remarkable as it is apparently restricted to the temperate climate zone in the southern part of South Africa. The genus occurs not only in the particular habitats that are typical for that zone but also in other environments.

== Species ==
As of September 2025, this genus includes ten species:

- Chumma bicolor Jocqué & Alderweireldt, 2018 – South Africa
- Chumma foliata Jocqué & Alderweireldt, 2018 – South Africa
- Chumma foordi Marusik & Haddad, 2024 – South Africa
- Chumma gastroperforata Jocqué, 2001 – South Africa
- Chumma inquieta Jocqué, 2001 – South Africa (type species)
- Chumma interfluvialis Jocqué & Alderweireldt, 2018 – South Africa
- Chumma lesotho Jocqué & Alderweireldt, 2018 – Lesotho
- Chumma striata Jocqué & Alderweireldt, 2018 – South Africa
- Chumma subridens Jocqué & Alderweireldt, 2018 – South Africa
- Chumma tsitsikamma Jocqué & Alderweireldt, 2018 – South Africa

== Conservation ==
The conservation status of Chumma species varies significantly. Several species are classified as Data Deficient due to limited sampling and restricted distributions. Chumma gastroperforata is listed as Least Concern, while Chumma inquieta is classified as Endangered due to ongoing loss of its coastal habitat to housing developments. Chumma striata is regarded as Rare due to its small, restricted distribution range.
