= Rubrius =

Scientific classification
- Kingdom: Animalia
- Phylum: Arthropoda
- Subphylum: Chelicerata
- Class: Arachnida
- Order: Araneae
- Infraorder: Araneomorphae
- Family: Macrobunidae
- Genus: Rubrius; Simon, 1887

Type species
- R. antarcticus (Karsch, 1880)

Species
- 7, see text

Synonyms
- Pionaces

Genus of spiders

Rubrius is a genus of South American spiders in the family Macrobunidae first described by Eugène Simon in 1887.

== Species ==
As of April 2019, the genus contains seven species found in Chile and Argentina:

- Rubrius annulatus F. O. Pickard-Cambridge, 1899 – Chile
- Rubrius antarcticus (Karsch, 1880) – Chile, Argentina
- Rubrius castaneifrons (Simon, 1884) – Chile
- Rubrius lineatus Roth, 1967 – Chile
- Rubrius major (Simon, 1904) – Chile
- Rubrius scottae Mello-Leitão, 1940 – Argentina
- Rubrius ululus Roth, 1967 – Chile
