= Auximella =

Scientific classification
- Kingdom: Animalia
- Phylum: Arthropoda
- Subphylum: Chelicerata
- Class: Arachnida
- Order: Araneae
- Infraorder: Araneomorphae
- Family: Macrobunidae
- Genus: Auximella; Strand, 1908

Type species
- A. typica Strand, 1908

Species
- 6, see text

Synonyms
- Notolathys

Genus of spiders

Auximella is a genus of South American spiders in the family Macrobunidae first described by Embrik Strand in 1908.

== Species ==
As of April 2019 it contains six species:

- Auximella harpagula (Simon, 1906) – Ecuador
- Auximella minensis (Mello-Leitão, 1926) – Brazil
- Auximella producta (Chamberlin, 1916) – Peru
- Auximella spinosa (Mello-Leitão, 1926) – Brazil
- Auximella subdifficilis (Mello-Leitão, 1920) – Brazil
- Auximella typica Strand, 1908 – Peru
