= Cavernocymbium =

Scientific classification
- Domain: Eukaryota
- Kingdom: Animalia
- Phylum: Arthropoda
- Subphylum: Chelicerata
- Class: Arachnida
- Order: Araneae
- Infraorder: Araneomorphae
- Family: Macrobunidae
- Genus: Cavernocymbium; Ubick, 2005

Type species
- C. vetteri Ubick, 2005

Species
- C. prentoglei Ubick, 2005 – USA; C. vetteri Ubick, 2005 – USA

Genus of spiders

Cavernocymbium is a genus of North American spiders in the family Macrobunidae first described by D. Ubick in 2005. As of April 2019 it contains only two species, both found in United States.
