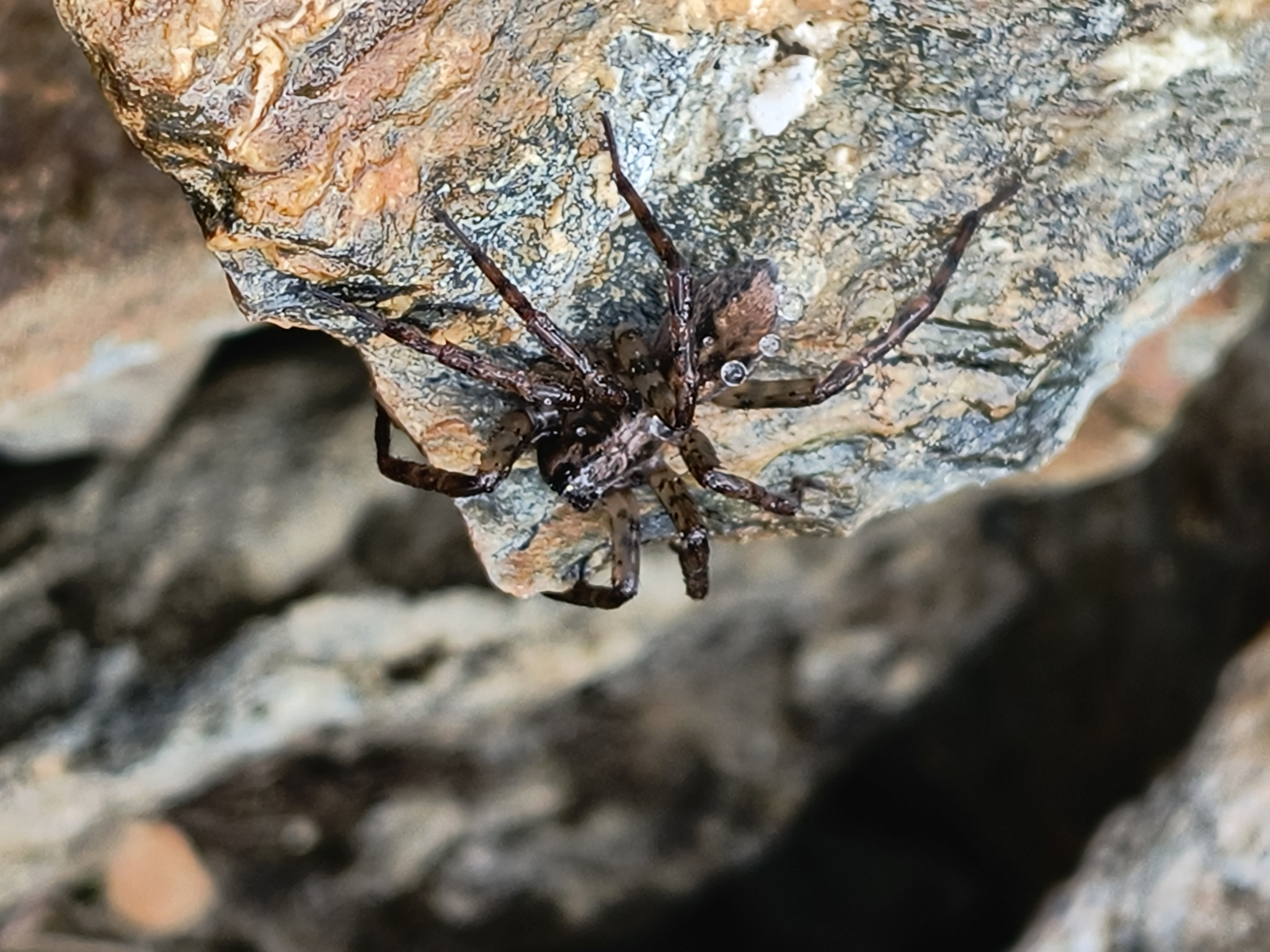
- Emmenomma oculatum from Argentina

Scientific classification
- Kingdom: Animalia
- Phylum: Arthropoda
- Subphylum: Chelicerata
- Class: Arachnida
- Order: Araneae
- Infraorder: Araneomorphae
- Family: Macrobunidae
- Genus: Emmenomma; Simon, 1884

Type species
- E. oculatum Simon, 1884

Species
- E. joshuabelli Almeida-Silva, Griswold & Brescovit, 2015 – Chile; E. obscurum Simon, 1905 – Argentina; E. oculatum Simon, 1884 – Chile, Argentina, Falkland Is.

= Emmenomma =

Genus of spiders

Emmenomma is a genus of South American spiders in the family Macrobunidae first described by Eugène Simon in 1884. As of April 2019 it contains only three species.
