= Malenella =

Scientific classification
- Kingdom: Animalia
- Phylum: Arthropoda
- Subphylum: Chelicerata
- Class: Arachnida
- Order: Araneae
- Infraorder: Araneomorphae
- Family: Macrobunidae
- Genus: Malenella
- Species: M. nana

Binomial name
- Malenella nana Ramírez, 1995

Genus of spiders

Malenella is a genus of South American spiders in the family Macrobunidae containing the single species, Malenella nana. It was first described by M. J. Ramírez in 1995, and has only been found in Chile. This genus was named in honour of María Elena Galiano.
