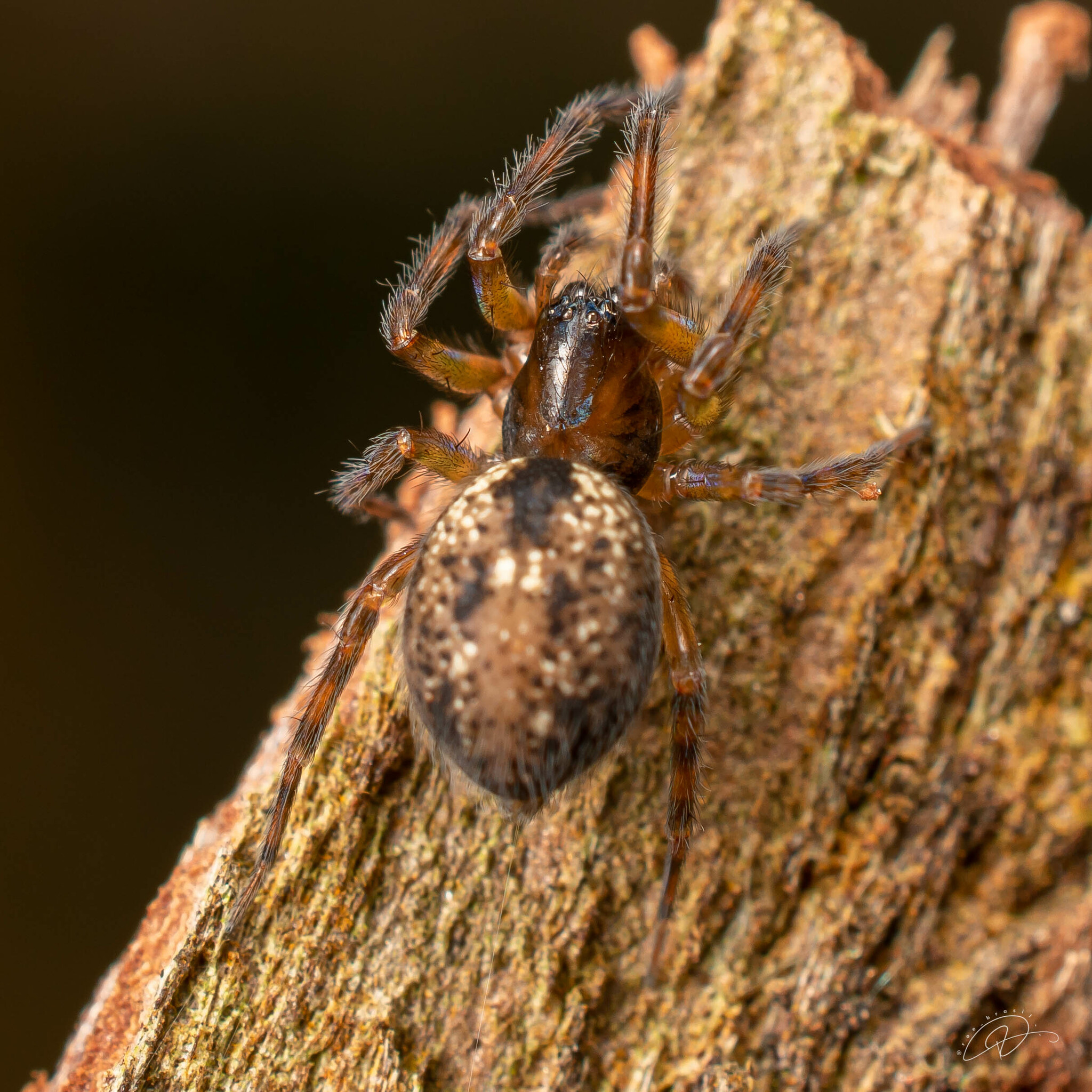
- Retiro sp. from Brazil
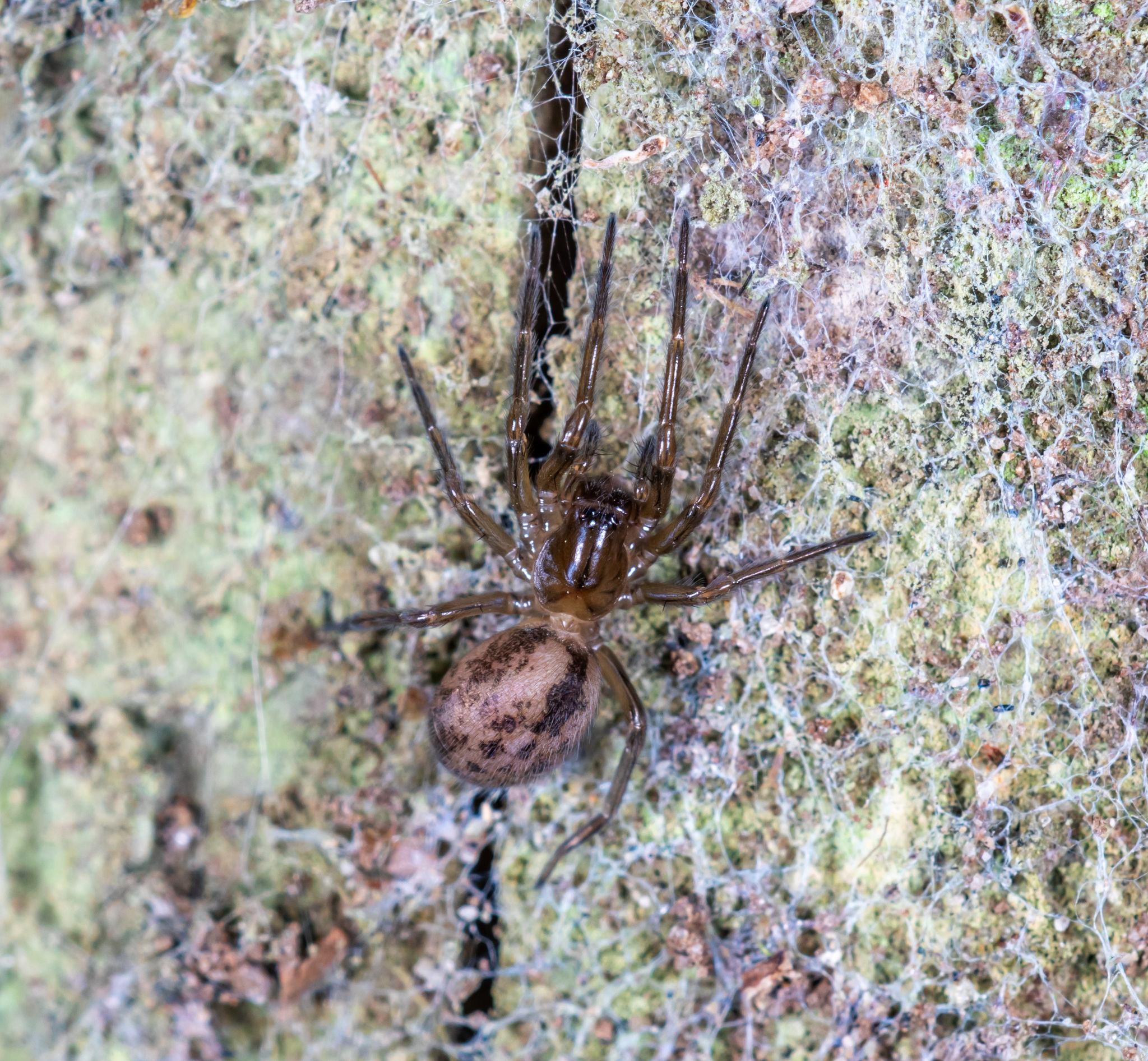
- Retiro sp. from Colombia

Scientific classification
- Kingdom: Animalia
- Phylum: Arthropoda
- Subphylum: Chelicerata
- Class: Arachnida
- Order: Araneae
- Infraorder: Araneomorphae
- Family: Macrobunidae
- Genus: Retiro; Mello-Leitão, 1915

Type species
- R. maculatus Mello-Leitão, 1915

Species
- 14, see text

= Retiro (spider) =

Genus of spiders

Retiro is a genus of South American and Central American spiders in the family Macrobunidae first described by Cândido Firmino de Mello-Leitão in 1915.

== Species ==
As of October 2025, this genus includes fourteen species:

- Retiro crinitus (Simon, 1893) – Venezuela
- Retiro fulvipes (Simon, 1906) – Ecuador
- Retiro granadensis (Keyserling, 1878) – Colombia
- Retiro gratus (Bryant, 1948) – Dominican Republic
- Retiro lanceolatus (Vellard, 1924) – Brazil
- Retiro leonardi Rodríguez-Castro & Rodríguez, 2025 – Colombia
- Retiro maculatus Mello-Leitão, 1915 – Brazil (type species)
- Retiro nigronotatus Mello-Leitão, 1947 – Brazil
- Retiro plagiatus (Simon, 1893) – Venezuela
- Retiro procerulus (Simon, 1906) – Ecuador
- Retiro quitensis (Simon, 1906) – Ecuador
- Retiro rhombifer (Simon, 1906) – Ecuador
- Retiro roberti (Reimoser, 1939) – Costa Rica
- Retiro sabatoi Rodríguez-Castro & Rodríguez, 2025 – Colombia
