= Parazanomys =

Scientific classification
- Domain: Eukaryota
- Kingdom: Animalia
- Phylum: Arthropoda
- Subphylum: Chelicerata
- Class: Arachnida
- Order: Araneae
- Infraorder: Araneomorphae
- Family: Macrobunidae
- Genus: Parazanomys
- Species: P. thyasionnes

Binomial name
- Parazanomys thyasionnes Ubick, 2005

Genus of spiders

Parazanomys is a genus of North American spiders in the family Macrobunidae containing the single species, Parazanomys thyasionnes. It was first described by D. Ubick in 2005, and has only been found in United States.
