= Tasmarubrius =

Scientific classification
- Kingdom: Animalia
- Phylum: Arthropoda
- Subphylum: Chelicerata
- Class: Arachnida
- Order: Araneae
- Infraorder: Araneomorphae
- Family: Macrobunidae
- Genus: Tasmarubrius; Davies, 1998

Type species
- T. milvinus (Simon, 1903)

Species
- 5, see text

Genus of spiders

Tasmarubrius is a genus of Australian spiders in the family Macrobunidae first described by V. T. Davies in 1998.

== Species ==
As of April 2019 it contains five species:

- Tasmarubrius hickmani Davies, 1998 – Australia (Tasmania)
- Tasmarubrius milvinus (Simon, 1903) – Australia (Tasmania)
- Tasmarubrius pioneer Davies, 1998 – Australia (Tasmania)
- Tasmarubrius tarraleah Davies, 1998 – Australia (Tasmania)
- Tasmarubrius truncus Davies, 1998 – Australia (Tasmania)
