= Tasmabrochus =

Scientific classification
- Kingdom: Animalia
- Phylum: Arthropoda
- Subphylum: Chelicerata
- Class: Arachnida
- Order: Araneae
- Infraorder: Araneomorphae
- Family: Macrobunidae
- Genus: Tasmabrochus; Davies, 2002

Type species
- T. cranstoni Davies, 2002

Species
- T. cranstoni Davies, 2002 – Australia (Tasmania); T. montanus Davies, 2002 – Australia (Tasmania); T. turnerae Davies, 2002 – Australia (Tasmania)

Genus of spiders

Tasmabrochus is a genus of Australian spiders in the family Macrobunidae first described by V. T. Davies in 2002. As of April 2019 it contains only three species.
