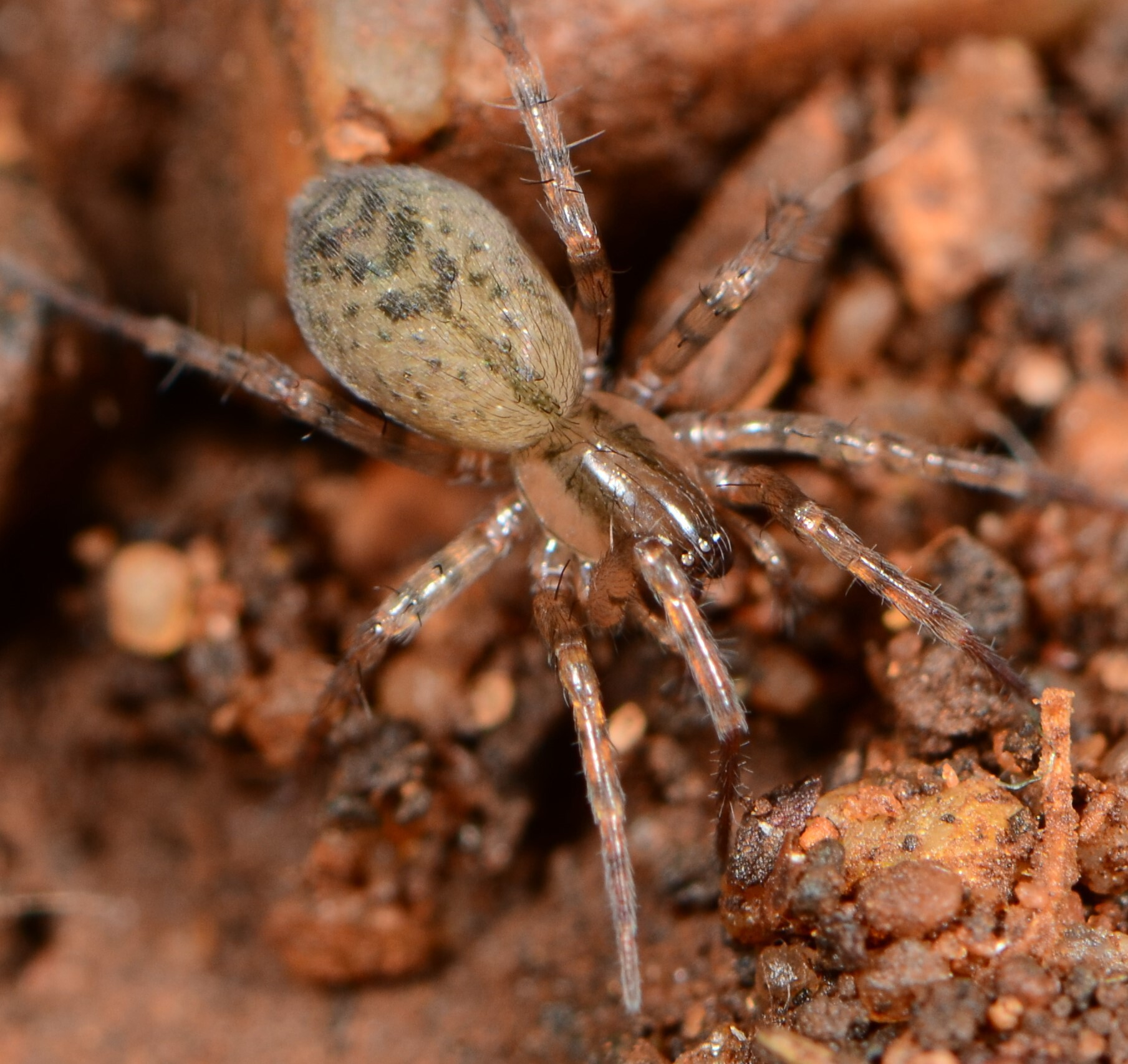
- Female C. invalida
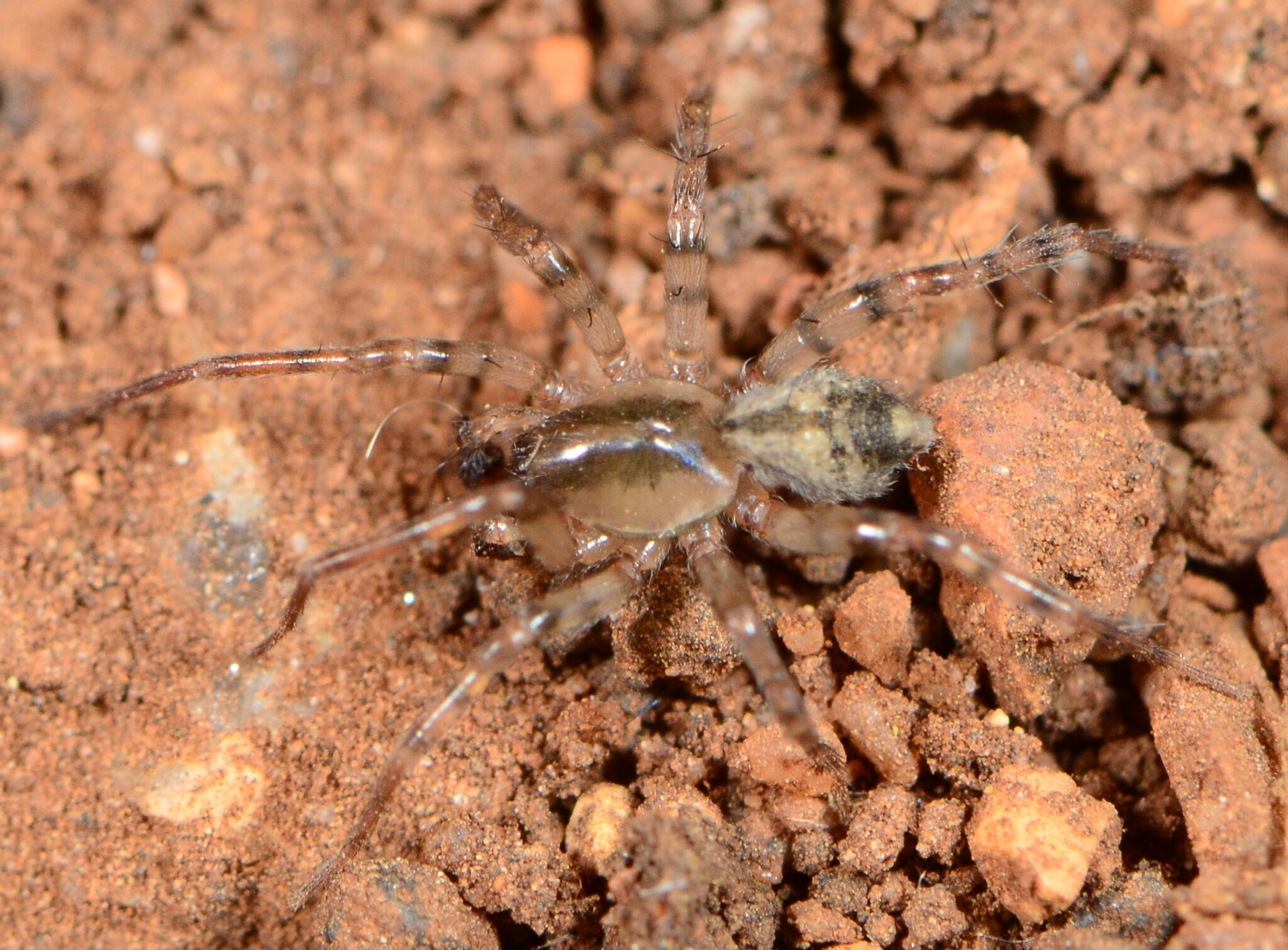
- Male C. invalida

Scientific classification
- Kingdom: Animalia
- Phylum: Arthropoda
- Subphylum: Chelicerata
- Class: Arachnida
- Order: Araneae
- Infraorder: Araneomorphae
- Family: Macrobunidae
- Genus: Chresiona; Simon, 1903

Type species
- Chresiona nigrosignata Simon, 1903

Diversity
- 3 species

= Chresiona =

Genus of spiders

Chresiona is a genus of spiders in the family Amaurobiidae, known as hackled mesh-web weavers. All three species in the genus are endemic to South Africa.

== Taxonomy ==
The genus Chresiona was originally described by Eugène Simon in 1903. The genus was originally placed in the Agelenidae, but was transferred to the Amaurobiidae by Pekka T. Lehtinen in 1967. More recently, it has been transferred to the Macrobunidae by Gorneau et al. (2023).

== Description ==
Chresiona spiders are small, with a total body size of 3-5 mm. The carapace is pale brown with darker bands around the border or on both sides of the fovea. The cephalic region is high and represents the widest part of the carapace, while the fovea is short. They have eight eyes arranged in two rows.

The opisthosoma is usually patterned and sometimes shows white reticulation shining through the integument. The colulus appears as a transverse plate. These spiders are ecribellate (lacking a cribellum). The legs are banded and equipped with three tarsal claws. Females have an epigyne with a semi-circular projection, while males possess a patellar apophysis and distinct retrolateral and dorsal tibial apophyses.

== Ecology and behavior ==
Chresiona species are free-living plant dwellers that have been sampled in high density while sweeping and beating low vegetation. Adults are particularly abundant in May. They inhabit the Fynbos biome and are collected through sweeping and beating low vegetation.

== Distribution ==
All three species of Chresiona are endemic to South Africa, with distributions ranging from the Western Cape to other provinces including the Free State, Gauteng, KwaZulu-Natal, Limpopo, Mpumalanga, and Eastern Cape.

== Species ==
As of September 2025, this genus includes three species:

- Chresiona convexa Simon, 1903 – South Africa
- Chresiona invalida (Simon, 1898) – South Africa, Lesotho
- Chresiona nigrosignata Simon, 1903 – South Africa (type species)

== Conservation ==
The conservation status of Chresiona species varies. C. invalida is listed as Least Concern due to its wide geographical range, while both C. convexa and C. nigrosignata are classified as Data Deficient for taxonomic reasons, as identification remains problematic and more sampling is needed.
