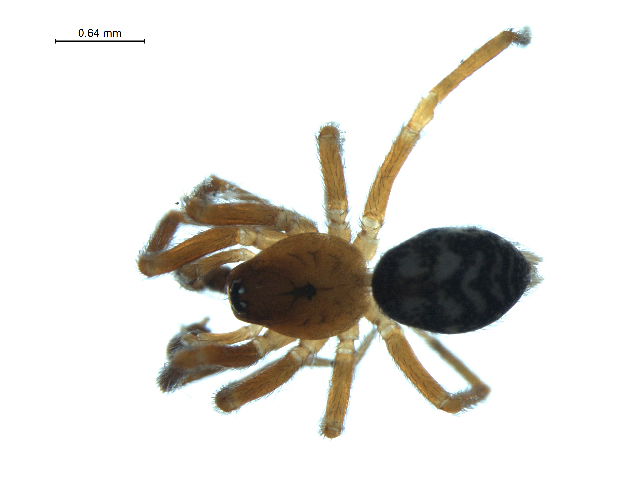
- Z. aquilonia, male
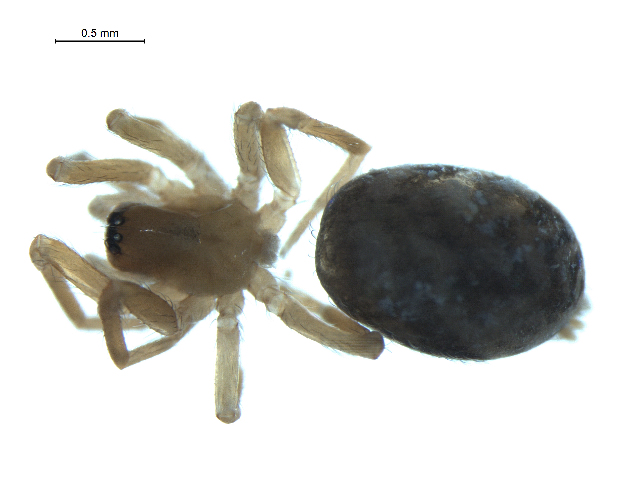
- Z. aquilonia, female

Scientific classification
- Kingdom: Animalia
- Phylum: Arthropoda
- Subphylum: Chelicerata
- Class: Arachnida
- Order: Araneae
- Infraorder: Araneomorphae
- Family: Macrobunidae
- Genus: Zanomys; Chamberlin, 1948

Type species
- Z. kaiba Chamberlin, 1948

Species
- 8, see text

= Zanomys =

Genus of spiders

Zanomys is a genus of North American spiders in the family Macrobunidae first described by R. V. Chamberlin in 1948.

== Species ==
As of April 2019 it contains eight species:

- Zanomys aquilonia Leech, 1972 – USA, Canada
- Zanomys californica (Banks, 1904) – USA
- Zanomys feminina Leech, 1972 – USA
- Zanomys hesperia Leech, 1972 – USA
- Zanomys kaiba Chamberlin, 1948 – USA
- Zanomys ochra Leech, 1972 – USA
- Zanomys sagittaria Leech, 1972 – USA
- Zanomys ultima Leech, 1972 – USA
