= Urepus =

Scientific classification
- Domain: Eukaryota
- Kingdom: Animalia
- Phylum: Arthropoda
- Subphylum: Chelicerata
- Class: Arachnida
- Order: Araneae
- Infraorder: Araneomorphae
- Family: Macrobunidae
- Genus: Urepus
- Species: U. rossi

Binomial name
- Urepus rossi Roth, 1967

Genus of spiders

Urepus is a genus of South American spiders in the family Macrobunidae containing the single species, Urepus rossi. It was first described by V. D. Roth in 1967, and has only been found in Peru.
