= Anisacate =

Scientific classification
- Domain: Eukaryota
- Kingdom: Animalia
- Phylum: Arthropoda
- Subphylum: Chelicerata
- Class: Arachnida
- Order: Araneae
- Infraorder: Araneomorphae
- Family: Macrobunidae
- Genus: Anisacate; Mello-Leitão, 1941

Type species
- A. fragile Mello-Leitão, 1941

Species
- 4, see text

Genus of spiders

Anisacate is a genus of South American spiders in the family Macrobunidae first described by Cândido Firmino de Mello-Leitão in 1941.

== Species ==
As of April 2019 it contained three species:

- Anisacate fragile Mello-Leitão, 1941 – Argentina
- Anisacate fuegianum (Simon, 1884) – Chile, Argentina
  - Anisacate f. bransfieldi (Usher, 1983) – Falkland Is.
- Anisacate tigrinum (Mello-Leitão, 1941) – Argentina
