= Yupanquia =

Scientific classification
- Domain: Eukaryota
- Kingdom: Animalia
- Phylum: Arthropoda
- Subphylum: Chelicerata
- Class: Arachnida
- Order: Araneae
- Infraorder: Araneomorphae
- Family: Macrobunidae
- Genus: Yupanquia
- Species: Y. schiapelliae

Binomial name
- Yupanquia schiapelliae Lehtinen, 1967

Genus of spiders

Yupanquia is a genus of South American spiders in the family Macrobunidae containing the single species, Yupanquia schiapelliae. It was first described by Pekka T. Lehtinen in 1967, and has only been found in Argentina.
