= Hicanodon =

Scientific classification
- Kingdom: Animalia
- Phylum: Arthropoda
- Subphylum: Chelicerata
- Class: Arachnida
- Order: Araneae
- Infraorder: Araneomorphae
- Family: Macrobunidae
- Genus: Hicanodon
- Species: H. cinerea

Binomial name
- Hicanodon cinerea Tullgren, 1901

Genus of spiders

Hicanodon is a genus of South American spiders in the family Macrobunidae containing the single species, Hicanodon cinerea. It was first described by Albert Tullgren in 1901, and has only been found in Chile and Argentina.
