= Callevopsis =

Scientific classification
- Kingdom: Animalia
- Phylum: Arthropoda
- Subphylum: Chelicerata
- Class: Arachnida
- Order: Araneae
- Infraorder: Araneomorphae
- Family: Macrobunidae
- Genus: Callevopsis
- Species: C. striata

Binomial name
- Callevopsis striata Tullgren, 1902

Synonyms
- Opsaltella

Genus of spiders

Callevopsis is a genus of South American spiders in the family Macrobunidae containing the single species, Callevopsis striata. It was first described by Albert Tullgren in 1902, and has only been found in Chile and Argentina.
