= Huoyanluo =

Scientific classification
- Kingdom: Animalia
- Phylum: Arthropoda
- Subphylum: Chelicerata
- Class: Arachnida
- Order: Araneae
- Infraorder: Araneomorphae
- Family: Macrobunidae
- Genus: Huoyanluo; Lin & Li, 2024

Type species
- H. ruanxiaoqi Lin & Li, 2024

Species
- 2, see text

Genus of spiders

Huoyanluo is a genus of spiders in the family Macrobunidae.

== Distribution ==
Huoyanluo is known only from China.

== Etymology ==
The genus name and the type species' name are derived from the same fictional character from Water Margin, Ruan Xiaoqi. 阮小七; Ruǎn Xiǎoqī goes by the nickname 活閻羅; Huó yánluó.

H. zhangzezhongi is named in honor of Mr. Zezhong Zhang (张泽忠; Zhāng Zézhōng), who helped the describers.

== Species ==
As of January 2026, this genus includes two species:

- Huoyanluo ruanxiaoqi Lin & Li, 2024 – China
- Huoyanluo zhangzezhongi Lin & Li, 2024 – China
