= Pseudauximus =

Scientific classification
- Kingdom: Animalia
- Phylum: Arthropoda
- Subphylum: Chelicerata
- Class: Arachnida
- Order: Araneae
- Infraorder: Araneomorphae
- Family: Macrobunidae
- Genus: Pseudauximus; Simon, 1902

Type species
- Pseudauximus reticulatus Simon, 1902

Diversity
- 3 species

Genus of spiders

Pseudauximus is an African endemic genus of spiders in the family Macrobunidae, known as hackled mesh-web weavers. All three species are endemic to South Africa.

== Taxonomy ==
The genus was originally described by Eugène Simon in 1902. It was initially placed in the Dictynidae, but was transferred to the Amaurobiidae by Pekka T. Lehtinen in 1967. More recently, it has been transferred to the Macrobunidae by Gorneau et al. (2023).

== Description ==
Pseudauximus spiders have a total body size of 4-6 mm. The carapace is pale yellowish with black patches on the striae. The cephalic region is high with a dark border, and the carapace is longer than wide and narrower in the eye region. The median ocular quadrangle is sub-rectangular. The fovea is long, narrow, and dark, varying from longitudinal to a simple depression.

The opisthosoma is yellow with white reticulation shining through the integument. It is oval and usually covered with a dense layer of short, fine setae. The cribellum is undivided, and the colulus appears as a transverse plate. The spinnerets are short. The legs are fairly long, especially in males. Females have an epigyne with a semi-circular projection.

== Ecology and behavior ==
Little is known about the behavior of Pseudauximus species. They are ground-dwelling spiders that are typically sampled from pitfall traps in various South African biomes including Fynbos, Savanna, Nama Karoo, and Succulent Karoo.

== Distribution ==
All three species of Pseudauximus are endemic to South Africa, distributed across the Western Cape, Northern Cape, Eastern Cape, and Limpopo provinces.

== Species ==
As of September 2025, this genus includes three species:

- Pseudauximus annulatus Purcell, 1908 – South Africa
- Pseudauximus pallidus Purcell, 1904 – South Africa
- Pseudauximus reticulatus Simon, 1902 – South Africa (type species)
