= Naevius (spider) =

Scientific classification
- Kingdom: Animalia
- Phylum: Arthropoda
- Subphylum: Chelicerata
- Class: Arachnida
- Order: Araneae
- Infraorder: Araneomorphae
- Family: Macrobunidae
- Genus: Naevius; Roth, 1967

Type species
- N. varius (Keyserling, 1879)

Species
- 4, see text

Genus of spiders

Naevius is a genus of South American spiders in the family Macrobunidae first described by V. D. Roth in 1967.

== Species ==
As of October 2025, this genus includes four species:

- Naevius calilegua Compagnucci & Ramírez, 2000 – Argentina
- Naevius manu Brescovit & Bonaldo, 1996 – Peru
- Naevius varius (Keyserling, 1879) – Peru (type species)
- Naevius zongo Brescovit & Bonaldo, 1996 – Bolivia
