= Livius macrospinus =

Scientific classification
- Kingdom: Animalia
- Phylum: Arthropoda
- Subphylum: Chelicerata
- Class: Arachnida
- Order: Araneae
- Infraorder: Araneomorphae
- Family: Macrobunidae
- Genus: Livius; Roth, 1967
- Species: L. macrospinus

Binomial name
- Livius macrospinus Roth, 1967

Genus of spiders

Livius macrospinus is a species of South American spiders in the family Macrobunidae. It is the only species in the genus Livius. The genus and species were first described by V. D. Roth in 1967, and have only been found in Chile.
