= Neoporteria (spider) =

Scientific classification
- Kingdom: Animalia
- Phylum: Arthropoda
- Subphylum: Chelicerata
- Class: Arachnida
- Order: Araneae
- Infraorder: Araneomorphae
- Family: Macrobunidae
- Genus: Neoporteria; Mello-Leitão, 1943

Type species
- N. pracellans Mello-Leitão, 1943

Species
- N. annulata Roth, 1967; N. pracellans Mello-Leitão, 1943

Genus of spiders

Neoporteria is a genus of South American spiders in the family Macrobunidae first described by Cândido Firmino de Mello-Leitão in 1943. Both described species are endemic to Chile.

== Species ==
As of October 2025, this genus includes two species:

- Neoporteria annulata Roth, 1967 – Chile
- Neoporteria pracellans Mello-Leitão, 1943 – Chile (type species)
