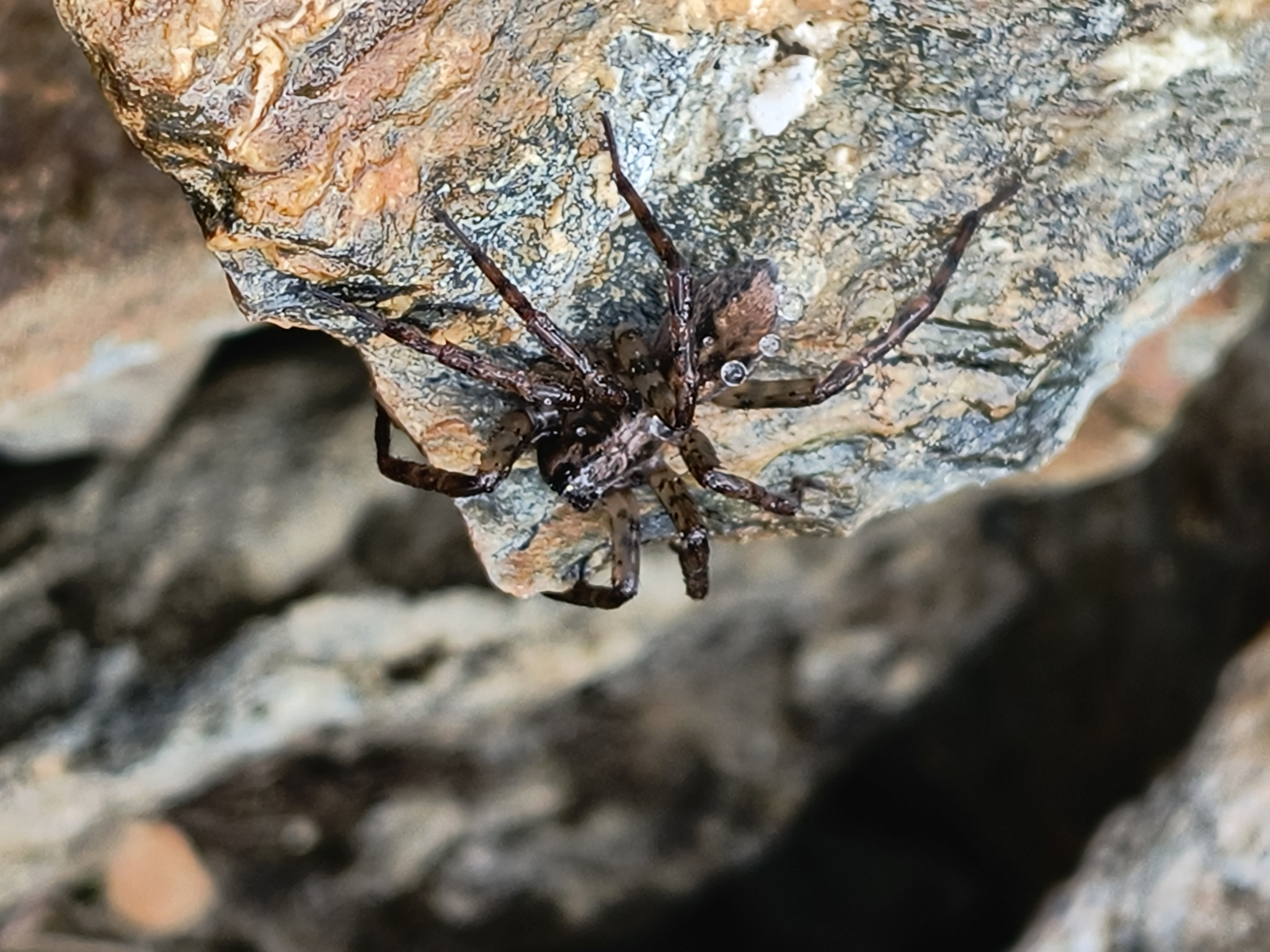
- Emmenomma oculatum
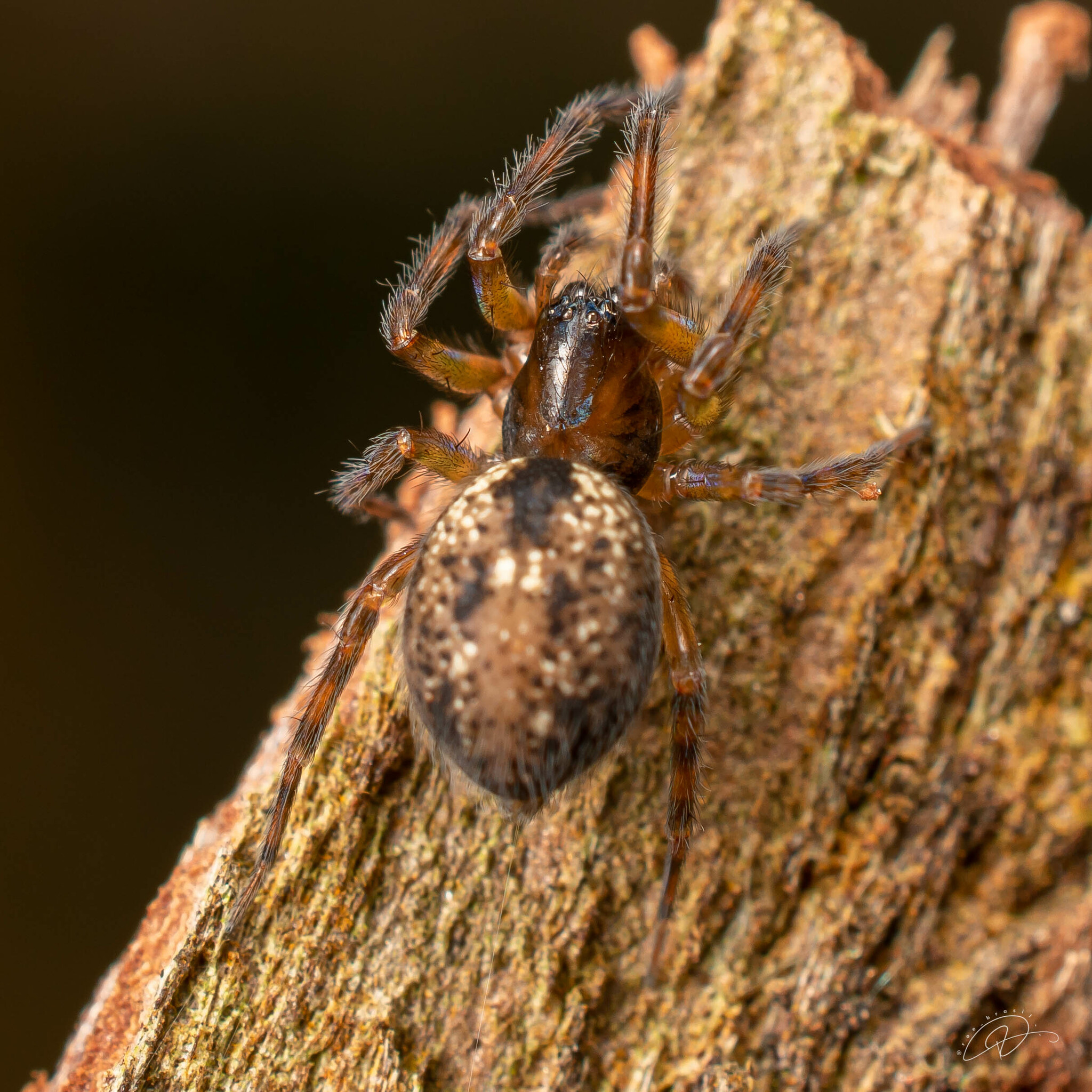
- Retiro sp. from Brazil

Scientific classification
- Kingdom: Animalia
- Phylum: Arthropoda
- Subphylum: Chelicerata
- Class: Arachnida
- Order: Araneae
- Infraorder: Araneomorphae
- Family: Macrobunidae; Bonnet, 1957

Genera
- See text
- blue: reported countries (WSC)

Synonyms
- Macrobuninae Bonnet, 1957

= Macrobunidae =

Family of spiders

Macrobunidae is a family of araneomorph spiders. It was treated as a subfamily of Amaurobiidae until elevated to a full family based on a 2023 molecular phylogenetic study.

== Taxonomy ==
A 2023 molecular phylogenetic study of the 'marronoid' group of initially nine spider families led to a changed circumscription of some of the families, including two resurrected or new families, Cicurinidae and Macrobunidae. The relationships in the study's maximum likelihood summary tree are shown below. The subfamily Macrobuninae was originally created as part of the family Amaurobiidae, but in the study was shown to be a monophyletic group well removed from Amaurobiidae. Accordingly it was raised to family rank.

- Marronoid clade
  - Amaurobiidae
  - - Agelenidae
    - - - Cycloctenidae
        - - Aorangia
          - - Stiphidiidae
            - Desidae
      - - Macrobunidae
        - - Hahniidae
          - - Cybaeidae
            - - Cicurinidae
              - - Toxopidae
                - Dictynidae

=== Genera ===
As of October 2025, this family includes 27 genera and 95 species:

- Aebutina Simon, 1892 – Brazil, Ecuador
- Anisacate Mello-Leitão, 1941 – Argentina, Chile, Falkland Islands
- Auximella Strand, 1908 – Brazil, Ecuador, Peru
- Callevopsis Tullgren, 1902 – Argentina, Chile
- Cavernocymbium Ubick, 2005 – United States
- Chresiona Simon, 1903 – Lesotho, South Africa
- Chumma Jocqué, 2001 – Lesotho, South Africa
- Emmenomma Simon, 1884 – Argentina, Chile, Falkland Islands
- Funny Lin & Li, 2022 – China
- Hicanodon Tullgren, 1901 – Argentina, Chile
- Huoyanluo Lin & Li, 2024 – China
- Livius Roth, 1967 – Chile
- Macrobunus Tullgren, 1901 – South Africa, Argentina, Chile
- Malenella Ramírez, 1995 – Chile
- Naevius Roth, 1967 – Argentina, Bolivia, Peru
- Neoporteria Mello-Leitão, 1943 – Chile
- Obatala Lehtinen, 1967 – South Africa
- Parazanomys Ubick, 2005 – United States
- Pseudauximus Simon, 1902 – South Africa
- Retiro Mello-Leitão, 1915 – Dominican Republic, Costa Rica, South America
- Rubrius Simon, 1887 – Argentina, Chile
- Tasmabrochus Davies, 2002 – Australia
- Tasmarubrius Davies, 1998 – Australia
- Teeatta Davies, 2005 – Australia
- Urepus Roth, 1967 – Peru
- Yupanquia Lehtinen, 1967 – Argentina
- Zanomys Chamberlin, 1948 – North America

== Description ==
Members of the 'marronoid' group of spiders are generally relatively small, brownish, and without striking morphological features. Macrobunidae species vary in whether they have a cribellum or not. Usually, cribellate macrobunids have an undivided cribellum, although some have a cribellum divided into two parts. Ecribellate macrobunids have a colulus in place of the cribellum. The tibiae of the male palp usually have multiple apophyses. The retrolateral tibial apophysis has a branch which engages with a stridulatory area on the cymbium.
