= Pityohyphantes costatus =

Scientific classification
- Domain: Eukaryota
- Kingdom: Animalia
- Phylum: Arthropoda
- Subphylum: Chelicerata
- Class: Arachnida
- Order: Araneae
- Infraorder: Araneomorphae
- Family: Linyphiidae
- Genus: Pityohyphantes
- Species: P. costatus

Binomial name
- Pityohyphantes costatus (Hentz, 1850)

Species of spider

Pityohyphantes costatus, the hammock spider, is a species of sheetweb spider in the family Linyphiidae. It is found in the United States. Its name comes from its webs resembling hammocks.

== Subspecies ==
These two subspecies belong to the species Pityohyphantes costatus:

- (Pityohyphantes costatus costatus) (Hentz, 1850)
- Pityohyphantes costatus annulipes (Banks, 1892)
