= Wubana drassoides =

Scientific classification
- Domain: Eukaryota
- Kingdom: Animalia
- Phylum: Arthropoda
- Subphylum: Chelicerata
- Class: Arachnida
- Order: Araneae
- Infraorder: Araneomorphae
- Family: Linyphiidae
- Genus: Wubana
- Species: W. drassoides

Binomial name
- Wubana drassoides (Emerton, 1882)

Species of spider

Wubana drassoides is a species of sheetweb spider in the family Linyphiidae. It is found in the United States.
