= Bathyphantes keeni =

Scientific classification
- Domain: Eukaryota
- Kingdom: Animalia
- Phylum: Arthropoda
- Subphylum: Chelicerata
- Class: Arachnida
- Order: Araneae
- Infraorder: Araneomorphae
- Family: Linyphiidae
- Genus: Bathyphantes
- Species: B. keeni

Binomial name
- Bathyphantes keeni (Emerton, 1917)

Species of spider

Bathyphantes keeni is a species of sheetweb spider in the family Linyphiidae. It is found in Canada and the United States.
