= Bathyphantes weyeri =

Conservation status
- Apparently Secure (NatureServe)

Scientific classification
- Kingdom: Animalia
- Phylum: Arthropoda
- Subphylum: Chelicerata
- Class: Arachnida
- Order: Araneae
- Infraorder: Araneomorphae
- Family: Linyphiidae
- Genus: Bathyphantes
- Species: B. weyeri

Binomial name
- Bathyphantes weyeri (Emerton, 1875)

Species of spider

Bathyphantes weyeri is a species of sheetweb spider in the family Linyphiidae. It is found in the USA.
