= Allomengea dentisetis =

Conservation status
- Secure (NatureServe)

Scientific classification
- Kingdom: Animalia
- Phylum: Arthropoda
- Subphylum: Chelicerata
- Class: Arachnida
- Order: Araneae
- Infraorder: Araneomorphae
- Family: Linyphiidae
- Genus: Allomengea
- Species: A. dentisetis

Binomial name
- Allomengea dentisetis (Grube, 1861)

Species of spider

Allomengea dentisetis is a species of sheetweb spider in the family Linyphiidae. It is found in North America as well as a range of Russia (Siberia to Far East), Kyrgyzstan, China, Mongolia, and Japan.
