= Bathyphantes pallidus =

Conservation status
- Secure (NatureServe)

Scientific classification
- Kingdom: Animalia
- Phylum: Arthropoda
- Subphylum: Chelicerata
- Class: Arachnida
- Order: Araneae
- Infraorder: Araneomorphae
- Family: Linyphiidae
- Genus: Bathyphantes
- Species: B. pallidus

Binomial name
- Bathyphantes pallidus (Banks, 1892)

Species of spider

Bathyphantes pallidus is a species of sheetweb spider in the family Linyphiidae. It is found in the United States and Canada.
