= Wubana pacifica =

Scientific classification
- Domain: Eukaryota
- Kingdom: Animalia
- Phylum: Arthropoda
- Subphylum: Chelicerata
- Class: Arachnida
- Order: Araneae
- Infraorder: Araneomorphae
- Family: Linyphiidae
- Genus: Wubana
- Species: W. pacifica

Binomial name
- Wubana pacifica (Banks, 1896)

Species of spider

Wubana pacifica is a species of sheetweb spider in the family Linyphiidae which is found in the United States.
