= Pityohyphantes cristatus =

Scientific classification
- Kingdom: Animalia
- Phylum: Arthropoda
- Subphylum: Chelicerata
- Class: Arachnida
- Order: Araneae
- Infraorder: Araneomorphae
- Family: Linyphiidae
- Genus: Pityohyphantes
- Species: P. cristatus

Binomial name
- Pityohyphantes cristatus Chamberlin & Ivie, 1942

Species of spider

Pityohyphantes cristatus is a species of sheetweb spider in the family Linyphiidae. It is found in the United States.

== Subspecies ==
These two subspecies belong to the species Pityohyphantes cristatus:

- (Pityohyphantes cristatus cristatus) Chamberlin & Ivie, 1942
- Pityohyphantes cristatus coloradensis Chamberlin & Ivie, 1942
