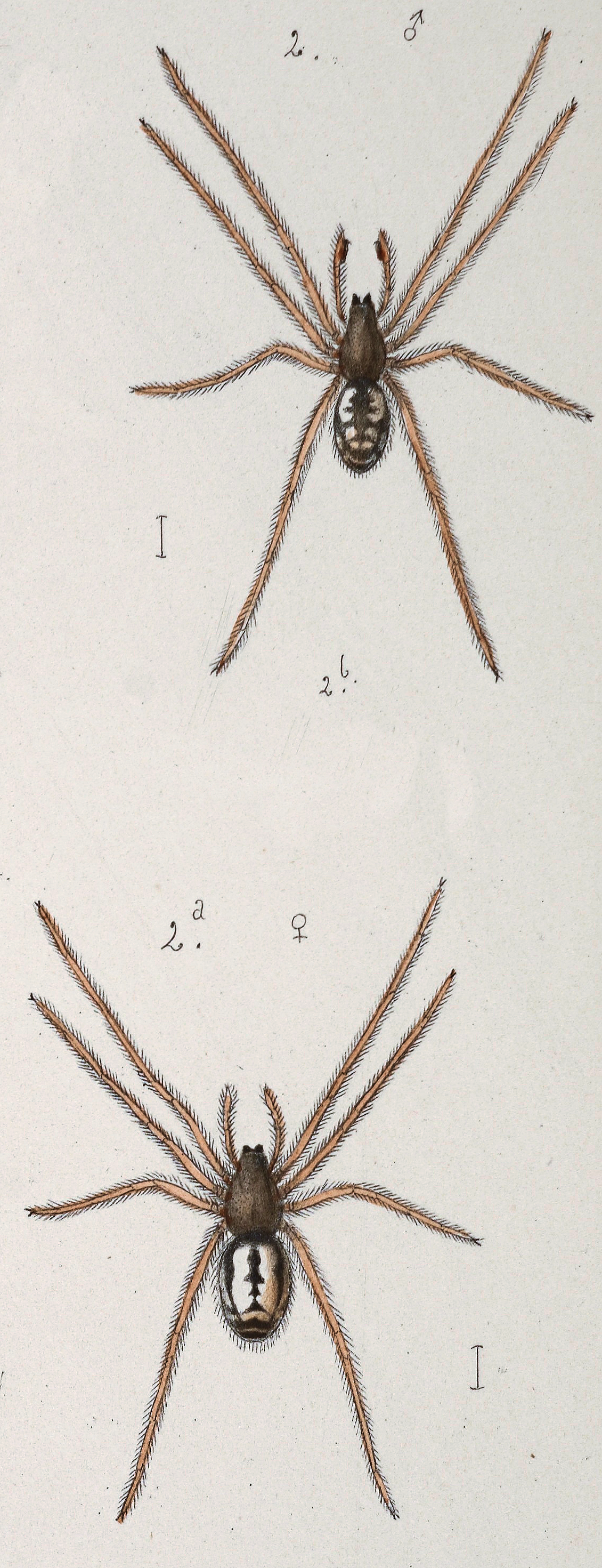
- Male and female Microlinyphia mandibulata

Scientific classification
- Domain: Eukaryota
- Kingdom: Animalia
- Phylum: Arthropoda
- Subphylum: Chelicerata
- Class: Arachnida
- Order: Araneae
- Infraorder: Araneomorphae
- Family: Linyphiidae
- Genus: Microlinyphia
- Species: M. mandibulata

Binomial name
- Microlinyphia mandibulata (Emerton, 1882)

= Microlinyphia mandibulata =

Species of spider

Microlinyphia mandibulata is a species of sheetweb spider in the family Linyphiidae. It is found in the United States.

== Subspecies ==
These two subspecies belong to the species Microlinyphia mandibulata:

- Microlinyphia mandibulata mandibulata (Emerton, 1882)^{i g b}
- Microlinyphia mandibulata punctata (Chamberlin & Ivie, 1943)^{i c g b}

Data sources: i = ITIS, c = Catalogue of Life, g = GBIF, b = Bugguide.net
