= Helophora reducta =

Scientific classification
- Domain: Eukaryota
- Kingdom: Animalia
- Phylum: Arthropoda
- Subphylum: Chelicerata
- Class: Arachnida
- Order: Araneae
- Infraorder: Araneomorphae
- Family: Linyphiidae
- Genus: Helophora
- Species: H. reducta

Binomial name
- Helophora reducta (Keyserling, 1886)

Species of spider

Helophora reducta is a species of sheetweb spider in the family Linyphiidae. It is found in the United States.
