= Kababina =

Scientific classification
- Kingdom: Animalia
- Phylum: Arthropoda
- Subphylum: Chelicerata
- Class: Arachnida
- Order: Araneae
- Infraorder: Araneomorphae
- Family: Stiphidiidae
- Genus: Kababina; Davies, 1995

Type species
- K. alta Davies, 1995

Species
- 9, see text

Genus of spiders

Kababina is a genus of Australian sheetweb spiders that was first described by V. T. Davies in 1995.

== Species ==
As of September 2019 it contains nine species, found in Queensland: K. formartine is misspelled as "formatine" in the heading, but the correct spelling is "formartine".

- Kababina alta Davies, 1995 (type) – Australia (Queensland)
- Kababina aquilonia Davies, 1995 – Australia (Queensland)
- Kababina colemani Davies, 1995 – Australia (Queensland)
- Kababina covacevichae Davies, 1995 – Australia (Queensland)
- Kababina formartine Davies, 1995 – Australia (Queensland)
- Kababina inferna Davies, 1995 – Australia (Queensland)
- Kababina isley Davies, 1995 – Australia (Queensland)
- Kababina superna Davies, 1995 – Australia (Queensland)
- Kababina yungaburra Davies, 1995 – Australia (Queensland)

== See also ==
- Carbinea
