= Bathyphantes alascensis =

Scientific classification
- Domain: Eukaryota
- Kingdom: Animalia
- Phylum: Arthropoda
- Subphylum: Chelicerata
- Class: Arachnida
- Order: Araneae
- Infraorder: Araneomorphae
- Family: Linyphiidae
- Genus: Bathyphantes
- Species: B. alascensis

Binomial name
- Bathyphantes alascensis (Banks, 1900)

Species of spider

Bathyphantes alascensis is a species of sheetweb spider in the family Linyphiidae. It is found in the United States and Canada.
