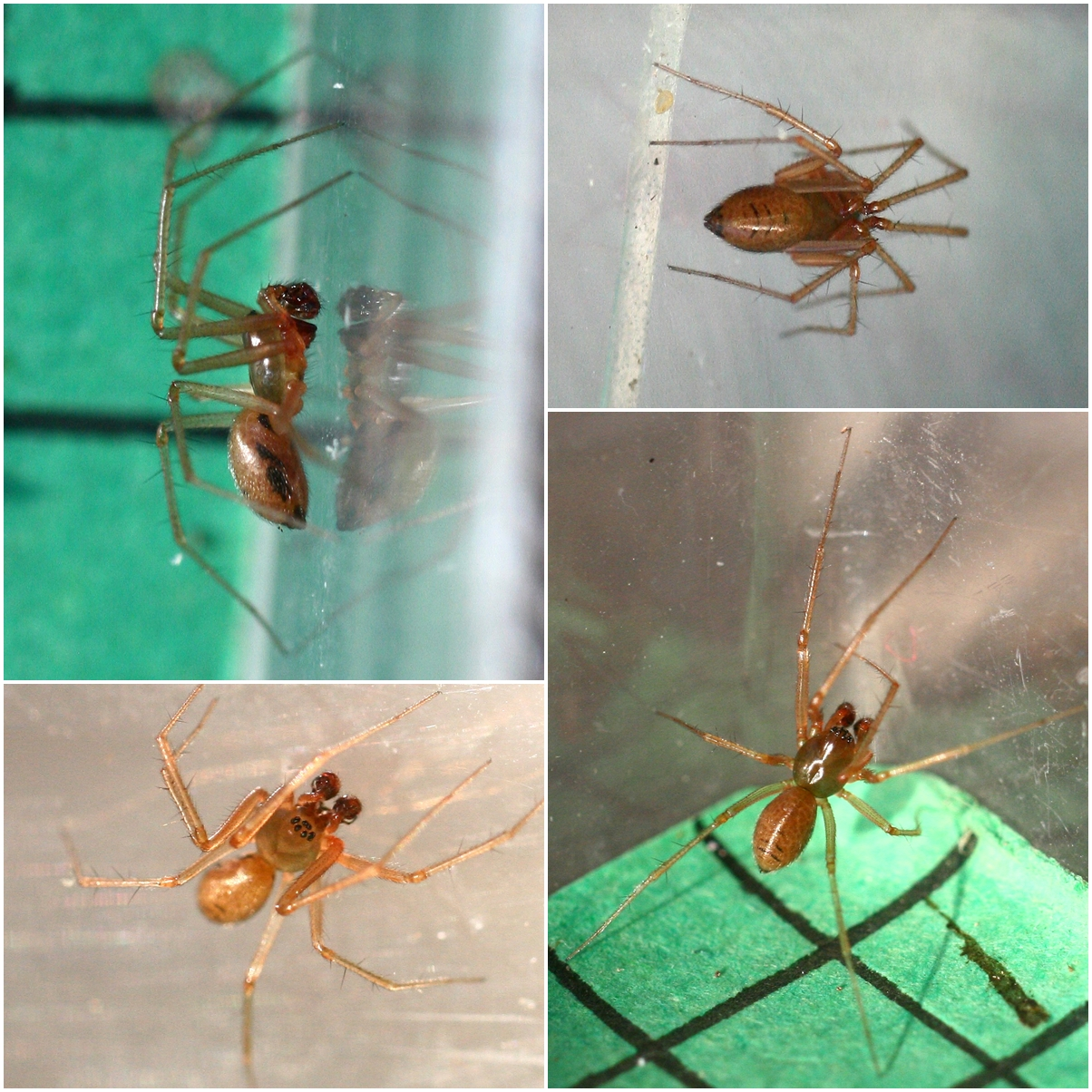

Scientific classification
- Domain: Eukaryota
- Kingdom: Animalia
- Phylum: Arthropoda
- Subphylum: Chelicerata
- Class: Arachnida
- Order: Araneae
- Infraorder: Araneomorphae
- Family: Linyphiidae
- Genus: Helophora
- Species: H. insignis

Binomial name
- Helophora insignis (Blackwall, 1841)

= Helophora insignis =

Species of spider

Helophora insignis is a species of sheetweb spider in the family Linyphiidae. It is found in North America, Europe, Caucasus, a range from Russia (European to Far East), and China.
