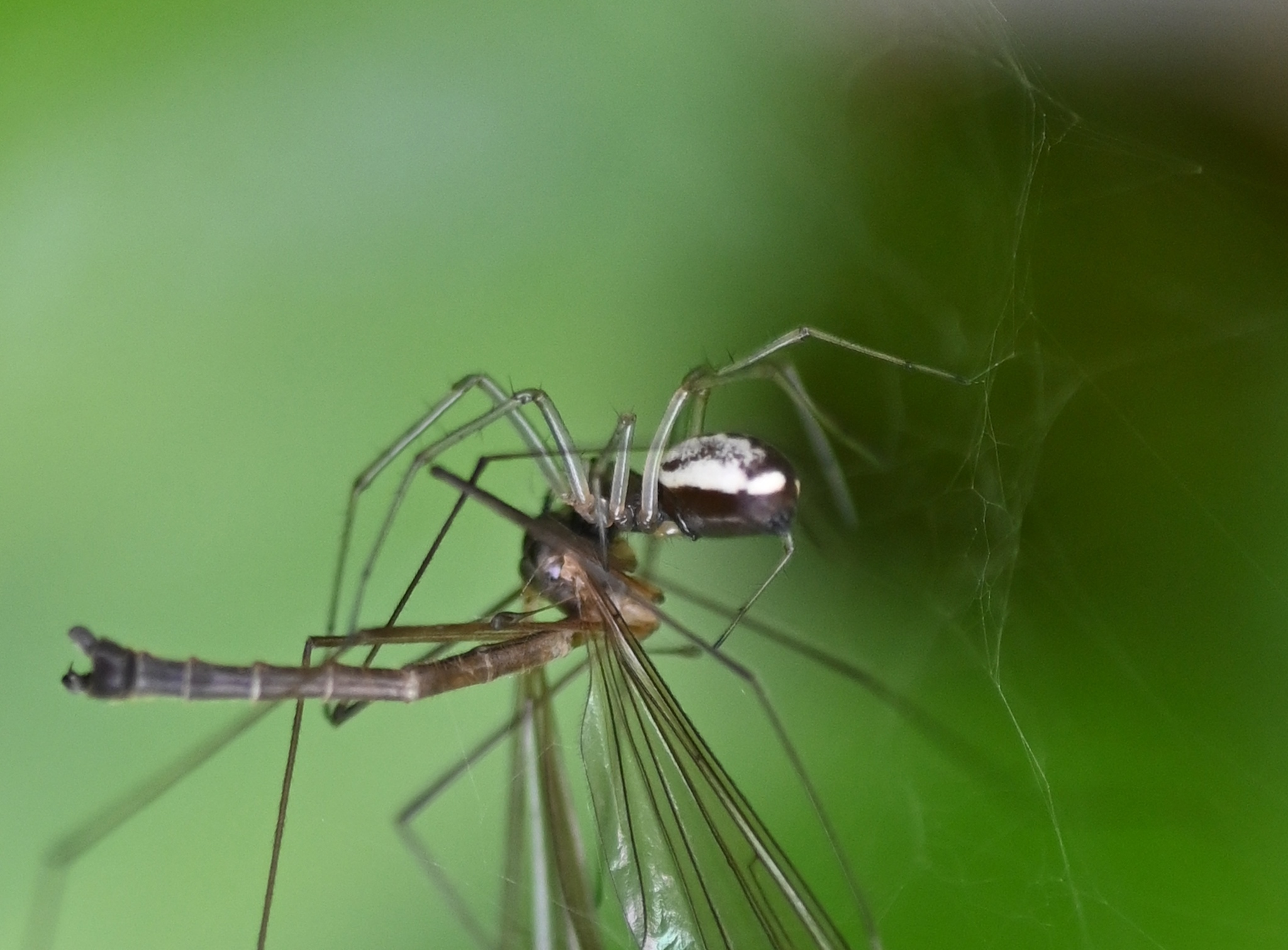
- Microlinyphia dana, Alaska

Scientific classification
- Kingdom: Animalia
- Phylum: Arthropoda
- Subphylum: Chelicerata
- Class: Arachnida
- Order: Araneae
- Infraorder: Araneomorphae
- Family: Linyphiidae
- Genus: Microlinyphia
- Species: M. dana

Binomial name
- Microlinyphia dana (Chamberlin & Ivie, 1943)

= Microlinyphia dana =

Species of spider

Microlinyphia dana is a species of sheetweb spider in the family Linyphiidae. It is found in the United States and Canada.
