= Bathyphantes orica =

Scientific classification
- Kingdom: Animalia
- Phylum: Arthropoda
- Subphylum: Chelicerata
- Class: Arachnida
- Order: Araneae
- Infraorder: Araneomorphae
- Family: Linyphiidae
- Genus: Bathyphantes
- Species: B. orica

Binomial name
- Bathyphantes orica Ivie, 1969

Species of spider

Bathyphantes orica is a species of sheetweb spider in the family Linyphiidae. It is found in the United States and Canada.
