= Pityohyphantes tacoma =

Scientific classification
- Kingdom: Animalia
- Phylum: Arthropoda
- Subphylum: Chelicerata
- Class: Arachnida
- Order: Araneae
- Infraorder: Araneomorphae
- Family: Linyphiidae
- Genus: Pityohyphantes
- Species: P. tacoma

Binomial name
- Pityohyphantes tacoma Chamberlin & Ivie, 1942

Species of spider

Pityohyphantes tacoma is a species of sheetweb spider in the family Linyphiidae. It is found in the United States.
