= Wuliphantes =

Scientific classification
- Kingdom: Animalia
- Phylum: Arthropoda
- Subphylum: Chelicerata
- Class: Arachnida
- Order: Araneae
- Infraorder: Araneomorphae
- Family: Linyphiidae
- Genus: Wuliphantes; Irfan, Wang & Zhang, 2023

Type species
- Wuliphantes trigyrus Irfan, Wang & Zhang, 2023

Species
- See text

Genus of spider

Wuliphantes is a genus of dwarf spiders in the family Linyphiidae, first described by Muhammad Irfan, Liang-Yu Wang, and Zhi-Sheng Zhang in 2023 based on specimens from Wulipo National Nature Reserve in Chongqing, China.

== Distribution ==
All species are known from various provinces of China, particularly in Chongqing and adjacent regions such as Hubei, Guizhou, and Zhejiang.

== Diagnosis ==
The genus is characterized in males by a very long embolus forming multiple coils (ranging from two to four depending on the species), the presence of a conspicuous membranous protegulum at the distal end of the tegulum, and an embolic plate with two projections (dorsal and ventral). Females lack a scape in the epigyne, and their copulatory ducts are transparent with several tightly coiled loops before reaching the spermathecae, which can be compact or helical.

== Etymology ==
The genus name is a contraction of 五里铺; Wǔlǐpù and genus Bathyphantes, the former genus for W. tongluensis.

== Species ==
As of October 2025, this genus includes five species:

- Wuliphantes dahonghaiensis Irfan, C. C. Zhang, Cai & Z. S. Zhang, 2025 – China
- Wuliphantes guanshan (Irfan, Wang & Zhang, 2022) – China
- Wuliphantes tongluensis (Chen & Song, 1988) – China
- Wuliphantes trigyrus Irfan, Wang & Zhang, 2023 – China (type species)
- Wuliphantes yaan Yao & Li, 2023 – China
