= Pityohyphantes rubrofasciatus =

Scientific classification
- Domain: Eukaryota
- Kingdom: Animalia
- Phylum: Arthropoda
- Subphylum: Chelicerata
- Class: Arachnida
- Order: Araneae
- Infraorder: Araneomorphae
- Family: Linyphiidae
- Genus: Pityohyphantes
- Species: P. rubrofasciatus

Binomial name
- Pityohyphantes rubrofasciatus (Keyserling, 1886)

Species of spider

Pityohyphantes rubrofasciatus is a species of sheetweb spider in the family Linyphiidae. It is found in the United States and Canada.
