= Wubana atypica =

Scientific classification
- Kingdom: Animalia
- Phylum: Arthropoda
- Subphylum: Chelicerata
- Class: Arachnida
- Order: Araneae
- Infraorder: Araneomorphae
- Family: Linyphiidae
- Genus: Wubana
- Species: W. atypica

Binomial name
- Wubana atypica Chamberlin & Ivie, 1936

Species of spider

Wubana atypica is a species of sheetweb spider in the family Linyphiidae. It is found in the United States and Canada, and was first described in 1936 by Chamberlin and Irvie.
