= Maladina =

Maladina is a surname of Oceanian origin.

== People with the surname ==
- Jimmy Maladina, Papua New Guinean politician
- Moses Maladina, Papua New Guinean politician

== See also ==
- Malarina
- Malagina
- Mladina
