= Pillara =

Scientific classification
- Kingdom: Animalia
- Phylum: Arthropoda
- Subphylum: Chelicerata
- Class: Arachnida
- Order: Araneae
- Infraorder: Araneomorphae
- Family: Stiphidiidae
- Genus: Pillara gray & Smith, 2004

Type species
- P. karuah Gray & Smith, 2004

Species
- 4, see text

Genus of spiders

Pillara is a genus of New South Welsh sheetweb spiders that was first described by M. R. Gray & H. M. Smith in 2004.

== Species ==
As of September 2019 it contains four species, found in New South Wales:

- Pillara coolahensis Gray & Smith, 2004 – Australia (New South Wales)
- Pillara griswoldi Gray & Smith, 2004 – Australia (New South Wales)
- Pillara karuah Gray & Smith, 2004 (type) – Australia (New South Wales)
- Pillara macleayensis Gray & Smith, 2004 – Australia (New South Wales)
