= Asmea =

Scientific classification
- Kingdom: Animalia
- Phylum: Arthropoda
- Subphylum: Chelicerata
- Class: Arachnida
- Order: Araneae
- Infraorder: Araneomorphae
- Family: Stiphidiidae
- Genus: Asmea; Gray & Smith, 2008

Type species
- A. akrikensis Gray & Smith, 2008

Species
- 4, see text

Genus of spiders

Asmea is a genus of Papuan sheetweb spiders that was first described by M. R. Gray & H. M. Smith in 2008.

== Species ==
As of September 2019 it contains four species, all found in Papua New Guinea:

- Asmea akrikensis Gray & Smith, 2008 (type) – New Guinea
- Asmea capella Gray & Smith, 2008 – New Guinea
- Asmea hayllari Gray & Smith, 2008 – New Guinea
- Asmea mullerensis Gray & Smith, 2008 – New Guinea
