= Borrala =

Scientific classification
- Kingdom: Animalia
- Phylum: Arthropoda
- Subphylum: Chelicerata
- Class: Arachnida
- Order: Araneae
- Infraorder: Araneomorphae
- Family: Stiphidiidae
- Genus: Borrala; Gray & Smith, 2004

Type species
- B. dorrigo Gray & Smith, 2004

Species
- 4, see text

Genus of spiders

Borrala is a genus of New South Welsh sheetweb spiders that was first described by Michael R. Gray & Helen M. Smith in 2004.

== Species ==
As of September 2019 it contains four species, found in New South Wales:

- Borrala dorrigo Gray & Smith, 2004 (type) – Australia (New South Wales)
- Borrala longipalpis Gray & Smith, 2004 – Australia (New South Wales)
- Borrala webbi Gray & Smith, 2004 – Australia (New South Wales)
- Borrala yabbra Gray & Smith, 2004 – Australia (New South Wales)
