= Couranga =

Scientific classification
- Kingdom: Animalia
- Phylum: Arthropoda
- Subphylum: Chelicerata
- Class: Arachnida
- Order: Araneae
- Infraorder: Araneomorphae
- Family: Stiphidiidae
- Genus: Couranga; Gray & Smith, 2008

Type species
- C. kioloa Gray & Smith, 2008

Species
- C. diehappy Gray & Smith, 2008 – Australia (Queensland, New South Wales); C. kioloa Gray & Smith, 2008 – Australia (Queensland, New South Wales)

Genus of spiders

Couranga is a genus of Australian sheetweb spiders that was first described by M. R. Gray & H. M. Smith in 2008. As of September 2019 it contains two species, found in New South Wales and Queensland: C. diehappy and C. kioloa.
