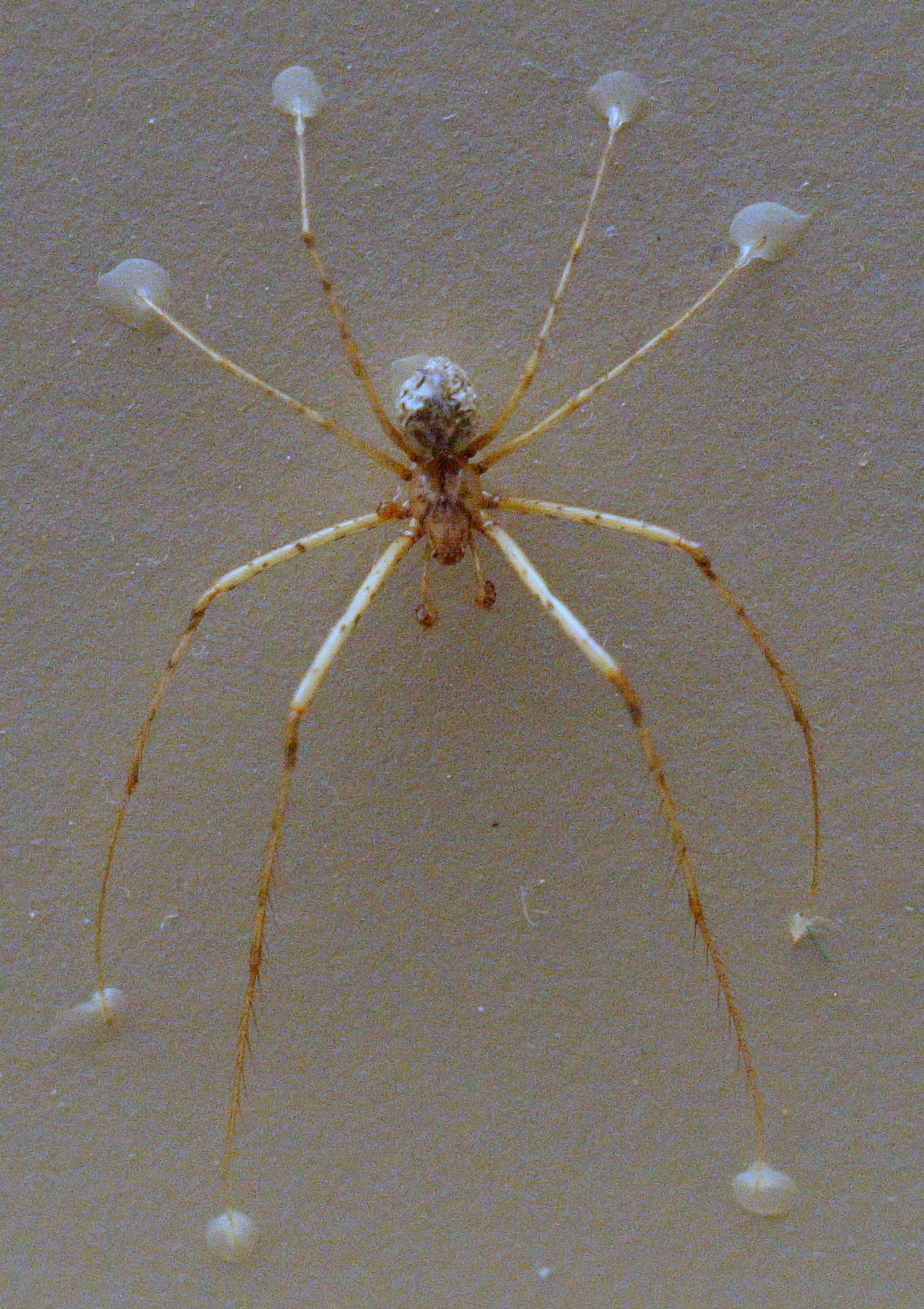
- male
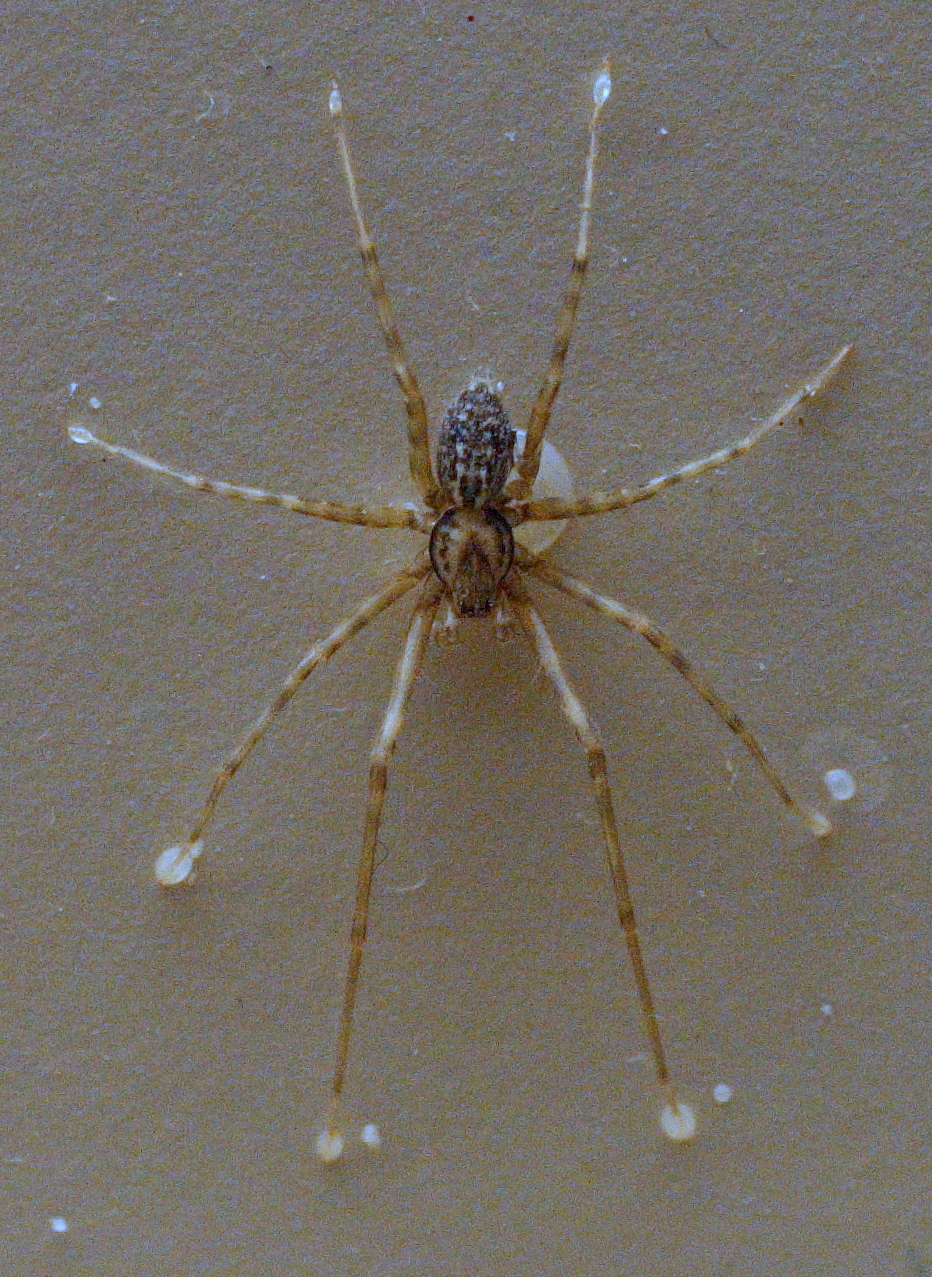
- female

Scientific classification
- Kingdom: Animalia
- Phylum: Arthropoda
- Subphylum: Chelicerata
- Class: Arachnida
- Order: Araneae
- Infraorder: Araneomorphae
- Family: Stiphidiidae
- Genus: Stiphidion
- Species: S. facetum

Binomial name
- Stiphidion facetum E. Simon, 1902

= Stiphidion facetum =

Species of spider

Stiphidion facetum is a species of spider in the genus Stiphidion native to Australia and also found in New Zealand.

== Invasions ==
The species of spider is competitive and willing to invade foreign webs. They are knowledgeable in that existing spider webs are made in prey rich environments, meaning there are incoming resources. The species that are more likely to survive invading another's home are the larger sheet web spiders[3].

== Diet ==
This species is greatly affected by the maternal diet, which drastically influences offspring survivorship. When a female consumes high-protein prey, her offspring are more likely to survive longer, grow faster, and produce daughters that are more reproductively successful.[4]
