= Karriella =

Scientific classification
- Kingdom: Animalia
- Phylum: Arthropoda
- Subphylum: Chelicerata
- Class: Arachnida
- Order: Araneae
- Infraorder: Araneomorphae
- Family: Stiphidiidae
- Genus: Karriella; Gray & Smith, 2008

Type species
- K. treenensis Gray & Smith, 2008

Species
- K. treenensis Gray & Smith, 2008 – Australia (Western Australia); K. walpolensis Gray & Smith, 2008 – Australia (Western Australia)

Genus of spiders

Karriella is a genus of Western Australian sheetweb spiders that was first described by M. R. Gray & H. M. Smith in 2008. As of September 2019 it contains two species, found in Western Australia: K. treenensis and K. walpolensis.
