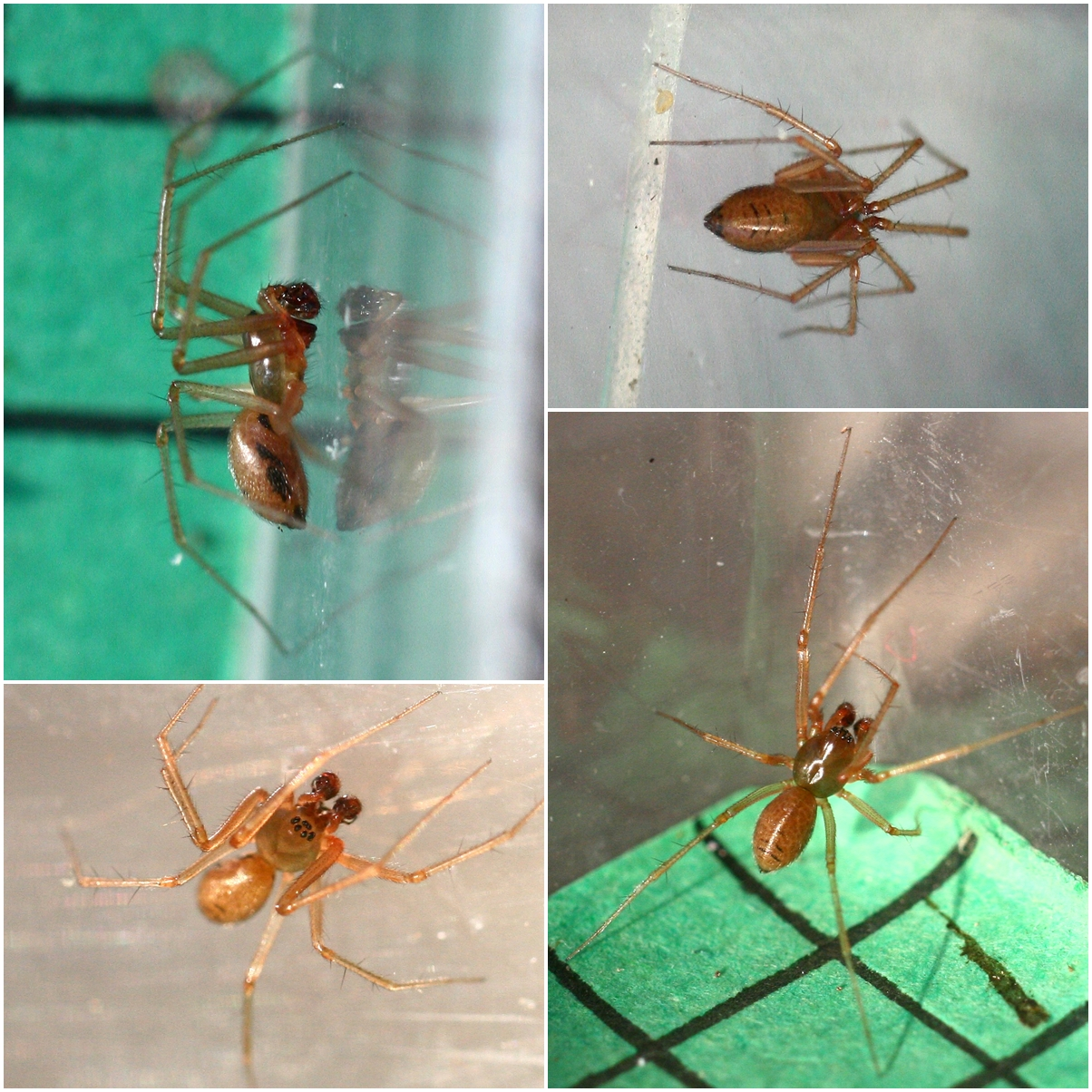
- Helophora cf. insignis, male

Scientific classification
- Kingdom: Animalia
- Phylum: Arthropoda
- Subphylum: Chelicerata
- Class: Arachnida
- Order: Araneae
- Infraorder: Araneomorphae
- Family: Linyphiidae
- Genus: Helophora; Menge, 1866

Type species
- H. insignis (Blackwall, 1841)

Species
- 5, see text

= Helophora =

Genus of spiders

Helophora is a genus of dwarf spiders that was first described by Anton Menge in 1866.

== Species ==
As of May 2019 it contains five species, found in China, Russia, and the United States:

- Helophora insignis (Blackwall, 1841) (type) – North America, Europe, Caucasus, Russia (Europe to Far East), Kyrgyzstan, China
- Helophora kueideensis Hu, 2001 – China
- Helophora orinoma (Chamberlin, 1919) – USA
- Helophora reducta (Keyserling, 1886) – USA
- Helophora tunagyna Chamberlin & Ivie, 1943 – USA
