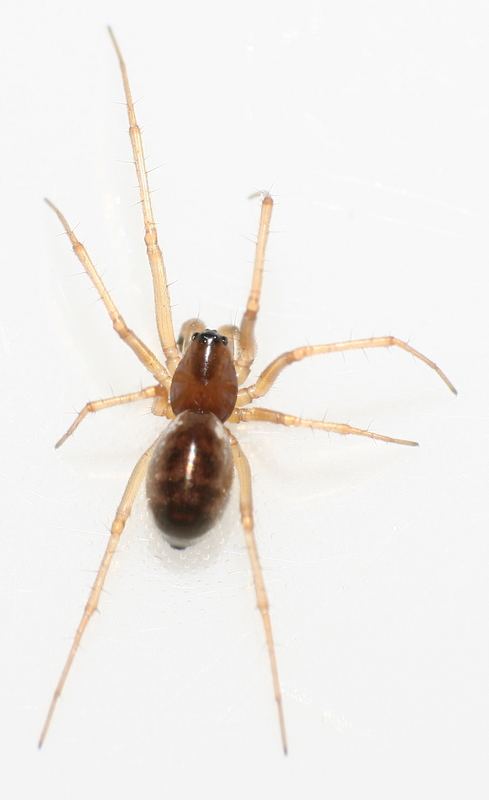
- M. pusilla
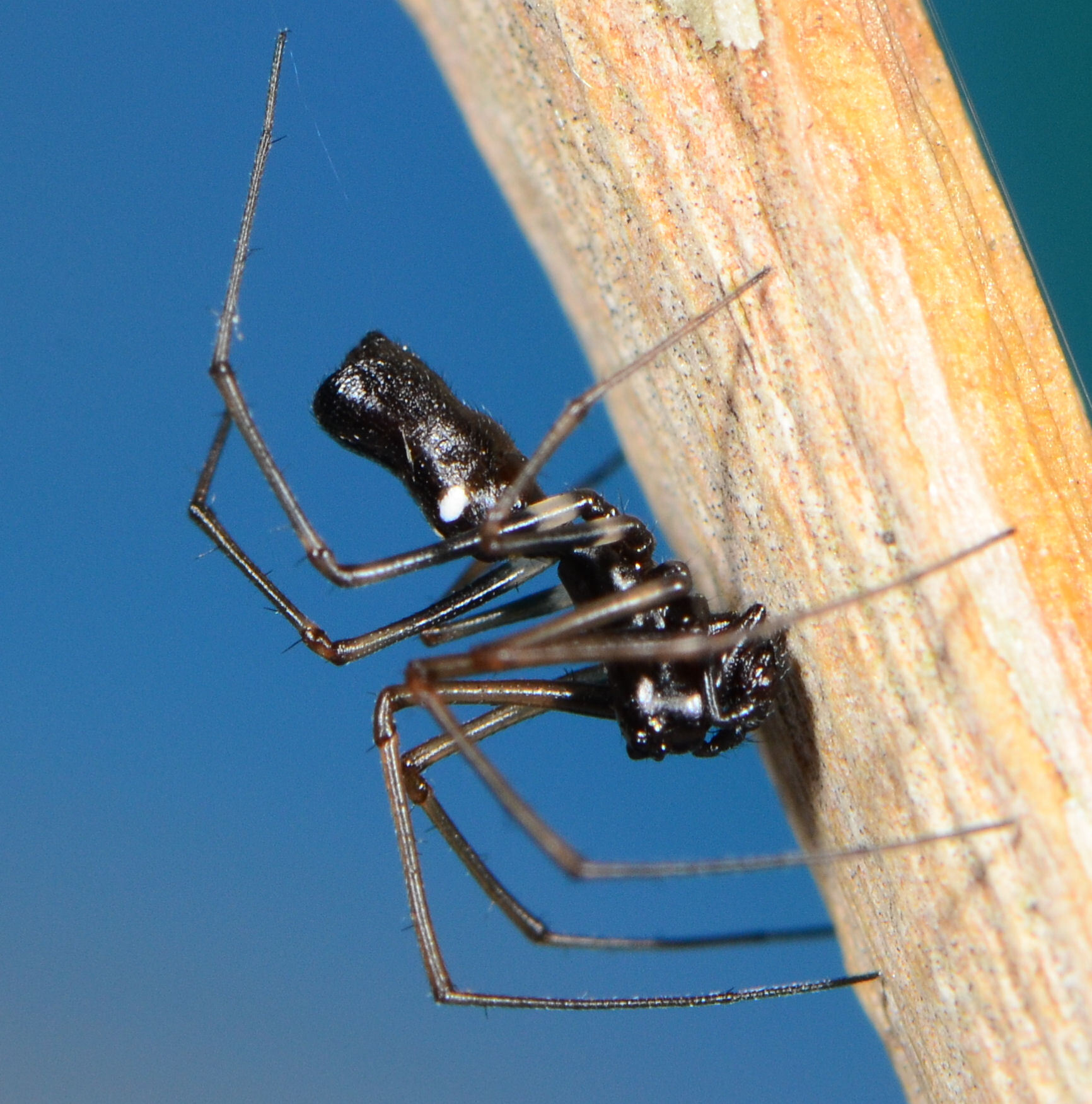
- male M. sterilis

Scientific classification
- Kingdom: Animalia
- Phylum: Arthropoda
- Subphylum: Chelicerata
- Class: Arachnida
- Order: Araneae
- Infraorder: Araneomorphae
- Family: Linyphiidae
- Genus: Microlinyphia; Gerhardt, 1928

Type species
- Linyphia pusilla Sundevall, 1830

Species
- 11, see text

Synonyms
- Bonnetiella Caporiacco, 1949; Pusillia Chamberlin & Ivie, 1943

= Microlinyphia =

Genus of spiders

Microlinyphia is a genus of dwarf spiders that was first described by U. Gerhardt in 1928.

== Species ==
As of October 2025, this genus includes thirteen species and one subspecies:

- Microlinyphia aethiopica (Tullgren, 1910) – East Africa
- Microlinyphia cylindriformis Jocqué, 1985 – Comoros
- Microlinyphia dana (Chamberlin & Ivie, 1943) – Alaska, Canada, United States
- Microlinyphia delesserti (Caporiacco, 1949) – Tanzania, Uganda, DR Congo
- Microlinyphia impigra (O. Pickard-Cambridge, 1871) – North America, Europe, Caucasus, Russia (Europe to Far East), China
- Microlinyphia johnsoni (Blackwall, 1859) – Azores, Madeira, Canary Islands
- Microlinyphia mandibulata (Emerton, 1882) – Alaska, Canada, United States
  - M. m. punctata (Chamberlin & Ivie, 1943) – Canada, United States
- Microlinyphia pusilla (Sundevall, 1830) – North America, Europe, North Africa, Turkey, Caucasus, Russia (Europe to Far East), Kazakhstan, Iran, Central Asia, Pakistan, India, China, Mongolia, Japan. Introduced to St. Helena (type species)
- Microlinyphia rehaiensis Irfan, Zhang & Peng, 2022 – China, Vietnam
- Microlinyphia simoni van Helsdingen, 1970 – Madagascar
- Microlinyphia spiralis Irfan, Zhang & Peng, 2022 – China
- Microlinyphia sterilis (Pavesi, 1883) – Central, east and southern Africa. Introduced to China
- Microlinyphia zhejiangensis (Chen, 1991) – China
