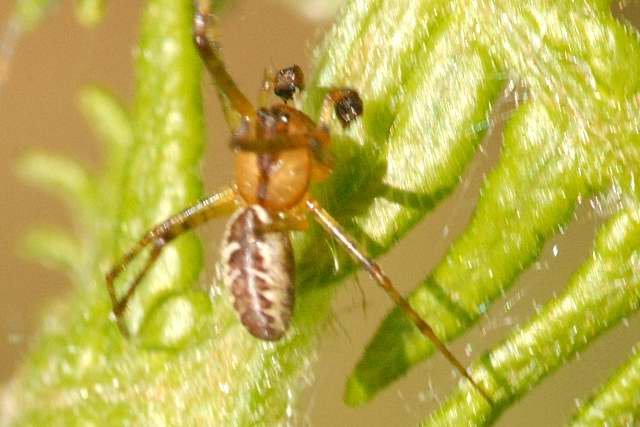
- P. phrygianus

Scientific classification
- Kingdom: Animalia
- Phylum: Arthropoda
- Subphylum: Chelicerata
- Class: Arachnida
- Order: Araneae
- Infraorder: Araneomorphae
- Family: Linyphiidae
- Genus: Pityohyphantes; Simon, 1929

Type species
- P. phrygianus (C. L. Koch, 1836)

Species
- 16, see text

= Pityohyphantes =

Hammock spiders

Genus of spiders

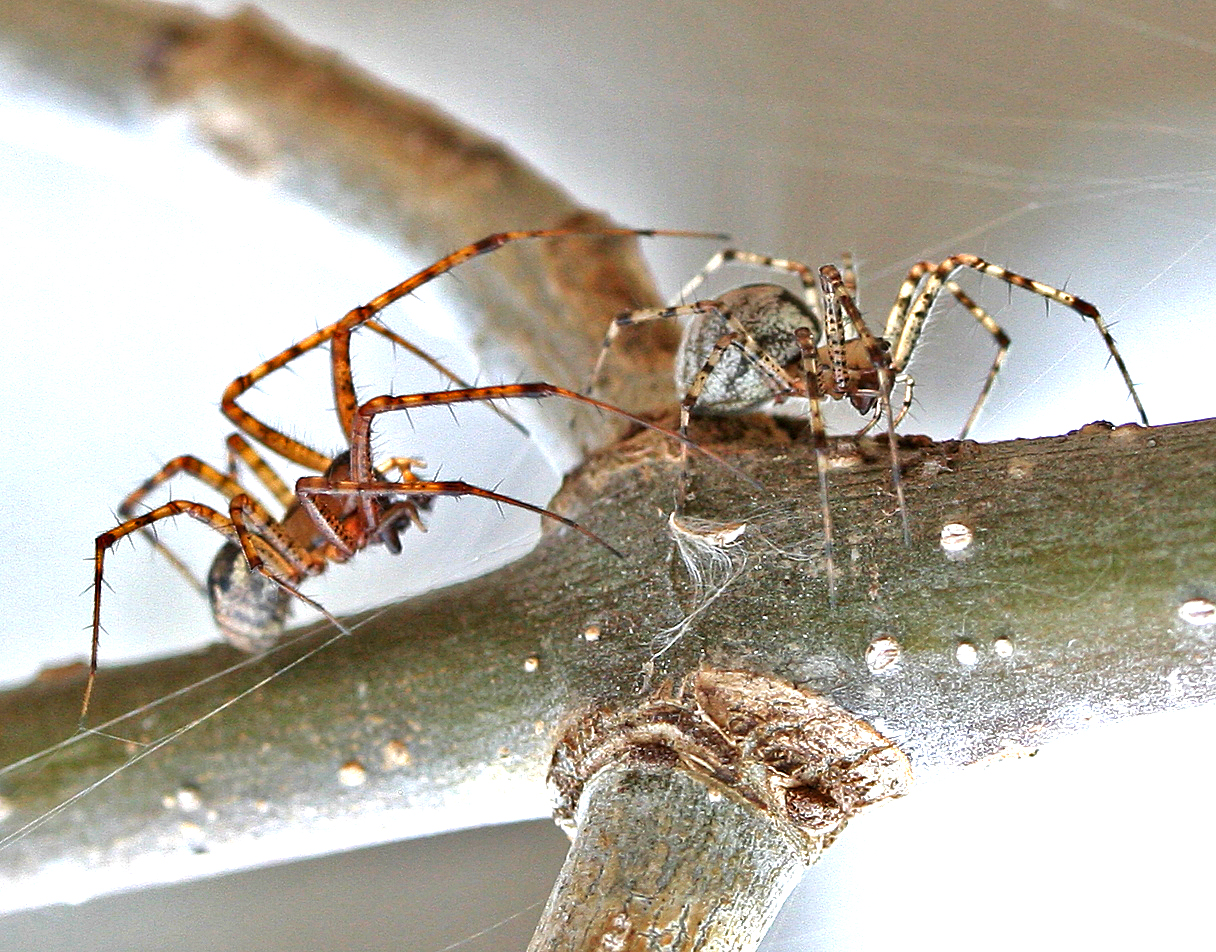
Sexually dimorphic male and female

Pityohyphantes, commonly known as hammock spiders, is a genus of sheet weavers that was first described by Eugène Louis Simon in 1929. The name comes from the Ancient Greek Πίτυς (pitys), meaning "pine", and hyphantes, meaning "weaver".

== Species ==
As of May 2019 it contains sixteen species and two subspecies, found in Europe and North America:

- Pityohyphantes alticeps Chamberlin & Ivie, 1943 – US, Canada
- Pityohyphantes brachygynus Chamberlin & Ivie, 1942 – US, Canada
- Pityohyphantes costatus (Hentz, 1850) – US, Canada
  - Pityohyphantes c. annulipes (Banks, 1892) – North America
- Pityohyphantes cristatus Chamberlin & Ivie, 1942 – US, Canada
  - Pityohyphantes c. coloradensis Chamberlin & Ivie, 1942 – US
- Pityohyphantes hesperus (Chamberlin, 1920) – US
- Pityohyphantes kamela Chamberlin & Ivie, 1943 – US, Canada
- Pityohyphantes limitaneus (Emerton, 1915) – US, Canada
- Pityohyphantes lomondensis Chamberlin & Ivie, 1941 – US
- Pityohyphantes minidoka Chamberlin & Ivie, 1943 – US, Canada
- Pityohyphantes navajo Chamberlin & Ivie, 1942 – US
- Pityohyphantes palilis (L. Koch, 1870) – Central, Eastern Europe
- Pityohyphantes pallidus Chamberlin & Ivie, 1942 – US
- Pityohyphantes phrygianus (C. L. Koch, 1836) (type) – Europe, Russia to Kazakhstan, Japan
- Pityohyphantes rubrofasciatus (Keyserling, 1886) – US, Canada
- Pityohyphantes subarcticus Chamberlin & Ivie, 1943 – Canada, US (Alaska)
- Pityohyphantes tacoma Chamberlin & Ivie, 1942 – US
