= Wabua =

Scientific classification
- Kingdom: Animalia
- Phylum: Arthropoda
- Subphylum: Chelicerata
- Class: Arachnida
- Order: Araneae
- Infraorder: Araneomorphae
- Family: Stiphidiidae
- Genus: Wabua; Davies, 2000

Type species
- W. major Davies, 2000

Species
- 11, see text

Genus of spiders

Wabua is a genus of Australian sheetweb spiders that was first described by V. T. Davies & C. L. Lambkin in 2000.

== Species ==
As of September 2019 it contains eleven species, found in Queensland:

- Wabua aberdeen Davies, 2000 – Australia (Queensland)
- Wabua cleveland Davies, 2000 – Australia (Queensland)
- Wabua crediton Davies, 2000 – Australia (Queensland)
- Wabua elliot Davies, 2000 – Australia (Queensland)
- Wabua eungella Davies, 2000 – Australia (Queensland)
- Wabua halifax Davies, 2000 – Australia (Queensland)
- Wabua hypipamee Davies, 2000 – Australia (Queensland)
- Wabua kirrama Davies, 2000 – Australia (Queensland)
- Wabua major Davies, 2000 (type) – Australia (Queensland)
- Wabua paluma Davies, 2000 – Australia (Queensland)
- Wabua seaview Davies, 2000 – Australia (Queensland)
