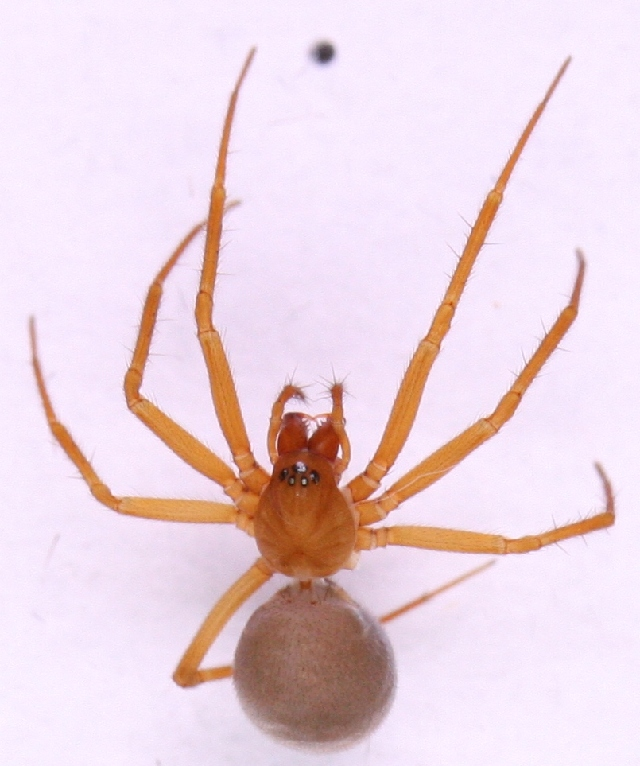
- A. scopigera

Scientific classification
- Kingdom: Animalia
- Phylum: Arthropoda
- Subphylum: Chelicerata
- Class: Arachnida
- Order: Araneae
- Infraorder: Araneomorphae
- Family: Linyphiidae
- Genus: Allomengea; Strand, 1912

Type species
- A. scopigera (Grube, 1859)

Species
- 6, see text

= Allomengea =

Genus of spiders

Allomengea is a genus of dwarf spiders that was first described by Embrik Strand in 1912.

== Species ==
As of May 2019 it contains six species:

- Allomengea beombawigulensis Namkung, 2002 – Korea
- Allomengea coreana (Paik & Yaginuma, 1969) – Korea
- Allomengea dentisetis (Grube, 1861) – North America, Russia (Europe to Far East), Kyrgyzstan, China, Mongolia, Japan
- Allomengea niyangensis (Hu, 2001) – China
- Allomengea scopigera (Grube, 1859) (type) – North America, Europe, Caucasus, Russia (Europe to Far East), Central Asia, Mongolia
- Allomengea vidua (L. Koch, 1879) – Canada, Europe, Russia (Europe to Middle Siberia)
