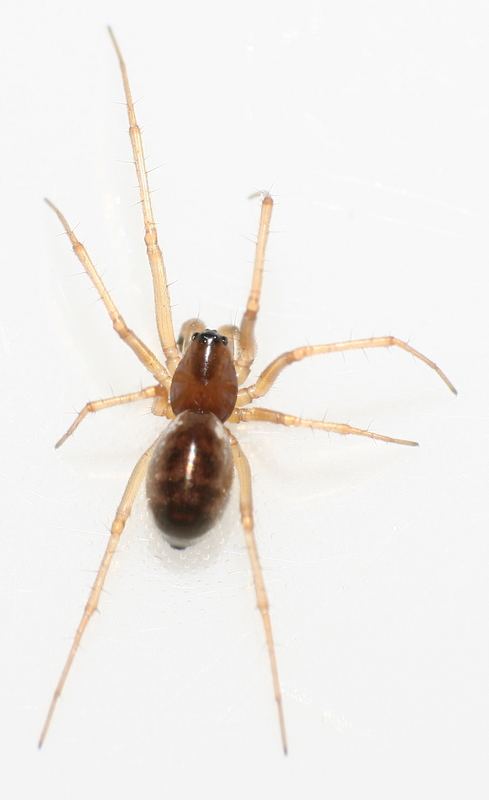

Scientific classification
- Domain: Eukaryota
- Kingdom: Animalia
- Phylum: Arthropoda
- Subphylum: Chelicerata
- Class: Arachnida
- Order: Araneae
- Infraorder: Araneomorphae
- Family: Linyphiidae
- Genus: Microlinyphia
- Species: M. pusilla

Binomial name
- Microlinyphia pusilla Sundevall, 1830

= Microlinyphia pusilla =

Species of spider

Microlinyphia pusilla is a species of spider belonging to the family Linyphiidae. It has a Holarctic distribution.

It was known as Linyphia pusilla until its reclassification in 1928.

This species displays strong sexual dimorphism: The male is black and shiny with a narrow abdomen, with a body length (excluding legs) of around 5 mm; The female is slightly larger with a much plumper, silvery abdomen bearing a leaf-shaped black mark. This spider constructs a small hammock-shaped web in vegetation near the ground.
