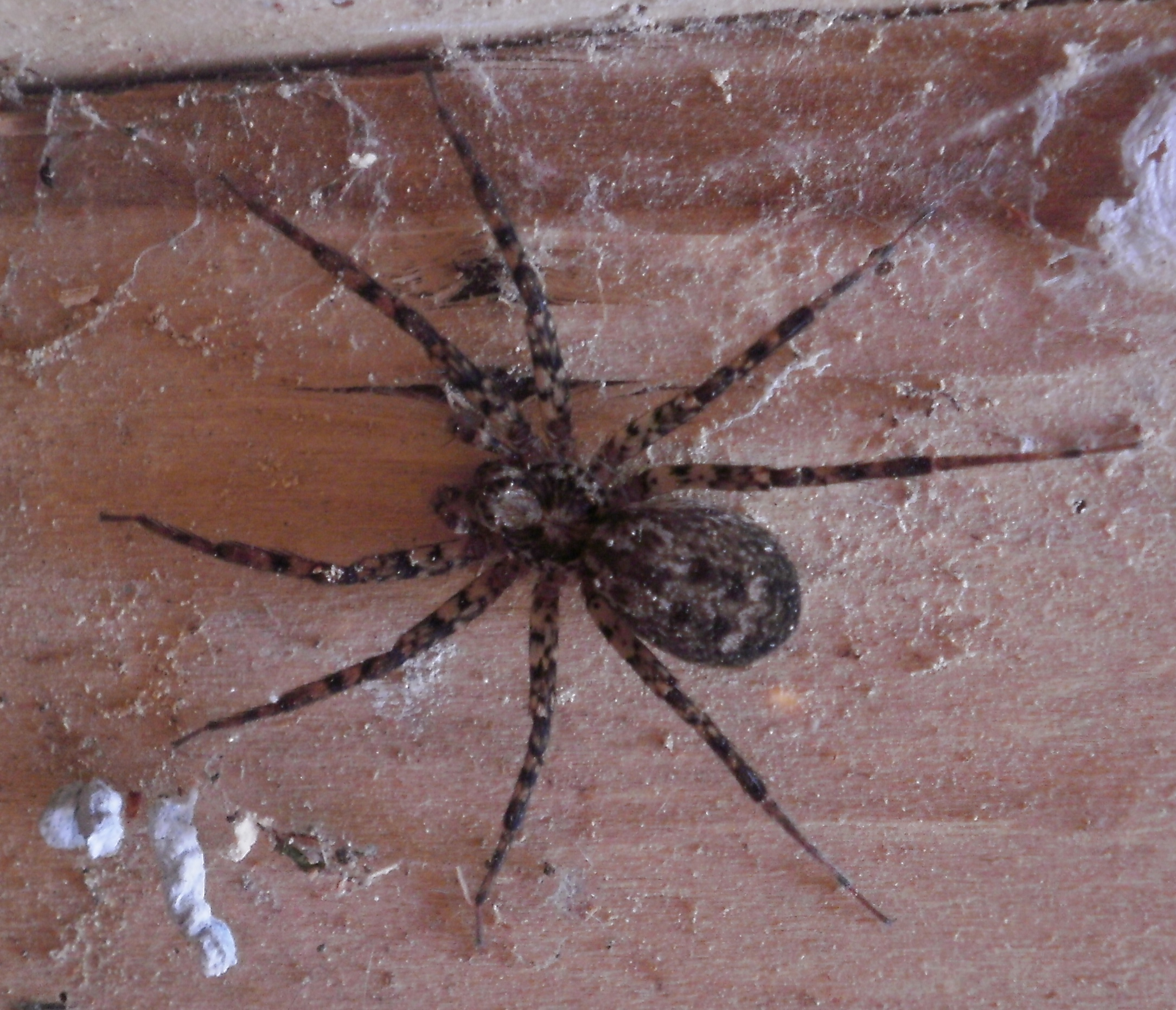
- S. facetum

Scientific classification
- Kingdom: Animalia
- Phylum: Arthropoda
- Subphylum: Chelicerata
- Class: Arachnida
- Order: Araneae
- Infraorder: Araneomorphae
- Family: Stiphidiidae
- Genus: Stiphidion; Simon, 1902

Type species
- S. facetum Simon, 1902

Species
- 4, see text

Synonyms
- Amarara Marples, 1959

= Stiphidion =

Genus of spiders

Stiphidion is a genus of South Pacific sheetweb spiders that was first described by Eugène Louis Simon in 1902. Originally placed with the Psechridae, it was moved to the Stiphidiinae in 1967. It is considered a senior synonym of Amarara.

== Species ==
As of September 2019 it contains four species, found in New Zealand and Australia:

- Stiphidion adornatum Davies, 1988 – Australia (Queensland)
- Stiphidion diminutum Davies, 1988 – Australia (Queensland)
- Stiphidion facetum Simon, 1902 (type) – Eastern Australia, Tasmania, New Zealand
- Stiphidion raveni Davies, 1988 – Australia (New South Wales)

Stiphidion fera is a synonym of S. facetum.
