= Wuliphantes dahonghaiensis =

Scientific classification
- Kingdom: Animalia
- Phylum: Arthropoda
- Subphylum: Chelicerata
- Class: Arachnida
- Order: Araneae
- Infraorder: Araneomorphae
- Family: Linyphiidae
- Genus: Wuliphantes
- Species: W. dahonghaiensis

Binomial name
- Wuliphantes dahonghaiensis Irfan, Zhang, Cai & Zhang, 2025

Species of spider

Wuliphantes dahonghaiensis is a species of dwarf spider in the family Linyphiidae, described in 2025 by Muhammad Irfan, Chang-Cheng Zhang, Yu-Jun Cai, and Zhi-Sheng Zhang. It is endemic to the Jiangjin District in Chongqing, China.

== Etymology ==
The species name refers to Dahonghai Lake, the main location where this spider was first discovered.

== Diagnostic characteristics ==
Males of Wuliphantes dahonghaiensis are distinguished by the shape of their reproductive structures. Specifically, the embolus, the slender tube that delivers sperm, makes only one coil, whereas in its close relative Wuliphantes trigyrus, the embolus makes three coils.

Additionally, the base of the protegulum, a supporting structure, is smooth and lacks tiny teeth, a contrast to W. trigyrus, which has a base lined with small teeth.

The female is recognizable by its spiral-shaped internal ducts, which make three loops before reaching the spermathecae, where sperm is stored. These spermathecae are bean-shaped, unlike the conical shapes found in related species.
