= Elleguna =

Scientific classification
- Kingdom: Animalia
- Phylum: Arthropoda
- Subphylum: Chelicerata
- Class: Arachnida
- Order: Araneae
- Infraorder: Araneomorphae
- Family: Stiphidiidae
- Genus: Elleguna; Gray & Smith, 2008

Type species
- E. major Gray & Smith, 2008

Species
- E. major Gray & Smith, 2008 – Australia (Queensland); E. minor Gray & Smith, 2008 – Australia (Queensland)

Genus of spiders

Elleguna is a genus of Australian sheetweb spiders that was first described by M. R. Gray & H. M. Smith in 2008. As of September 2019 it contains two species, found in Queensland: E. major and E. minor.
