= Wubana =

Scientific classification
- Kingdom: Animalia
- Phylum: Arthropoda
- Subphylum: Chelicerata
- Class: Arachnida
- Order: Araneae
- Infraorder: Araneomorphae
- Family: Linyphiidae
- Genus: Wubana; Chamberlin, 1919

Type species
- W. drassoides (Emerton, 1882)

Species
- 7, see text

Genus of spiders

Wubana is a genus of American sheet weavers that was first described by Ralph Vary Chamberlin in 1919.

== Species ==
As of June 2019 it contains seven species, found only in the United States:

- Wubana atypica Chamberlin & Ivie, 1936 – USA
- Wubana drassoides (Emerton, 1882) (type) – USA
- Wubana ornata Chamberlin & Ivie, 1936 – USA
- Wubana pacifica (Banks, 1896) – USA
- Wubana reminiscens Chamberlin, 1949 – USA
- Wubana suprema Chamberlin & Ivie, 1936 – USA
- Wubana utahana Chamberlin & Ivie, 1936 – USA
