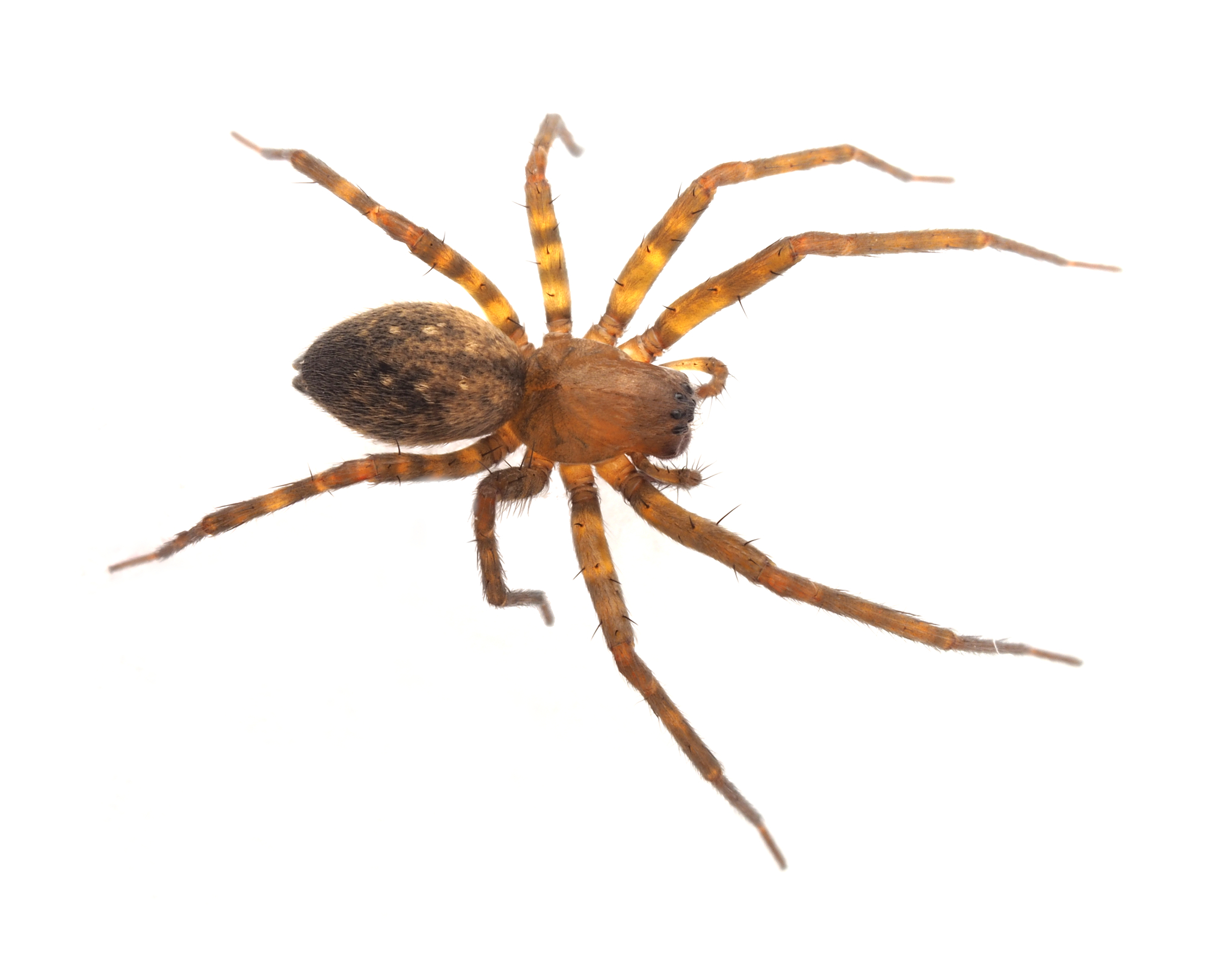
- Therlinya vexillum

Scientific classification
- Kingdom: Animalia
- Phylum: Arthropoda
- Subphylum: Chelicerata
- Class: Arachnida
- Order: Araneae
- Infraorder: Araneomorphae
- Family: Stiphidiidae
- Genus: Therlinya; Gray & Smith, 2002

Type species
- T. kiah Gray & Smith, 2002

Species
- 11, see text

= Therlinya =

Genus of spiders

Therlinya is a genus of Australian sheetweb spiders that was first described by M. R. Gray & H. M. Smith in 2002.

== Species ==
As of September 2019 it contains eleven species, found in Victoria, New South Wales, and Queensland:

- Therlinya angusta Gray & Smith, 2002 – Australia (Queensland)
- Therlinya ballata Gray & Smith, 2002 – Australia (New South Wales)
- Therlinya bellinger Gray & Smith, 2002 – Australia (New South Wales)
- Therlinya foveolata Gray & Smith, 2002 – Australia (Victoria)
- Therlinya horsemanae Gray & Smith, 2002 – Australia (Queensland)
- Therlinya kiah Gray & Smith, 2002 (type) – Australia (New South Wales, Victoria)
- Therlinya lambkinae Gray & Smith, 2002 – Australia (Queensland)
- Therlinya monteithi Gray & Smith, 2002 – Australia (Queensland)
- Therlinya nasuta Gray & Smith, 2002 – Australia (Queensland)
- Therlinya vexillum Gray & Smith, 2002 – Australia (Queensland)
- Therlinya wiangaree Gray & Smith, 2002 – Australia (Queensland, New South Wales)
