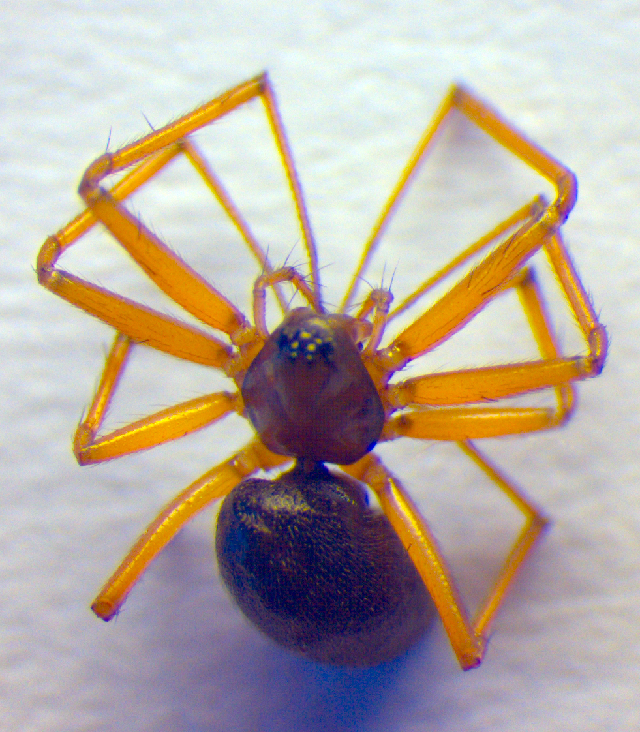
- Bathyphantes approximatus

Scientific classification
- Kingdom: Animalia
- Phylum: Arthropoda
- Subphylum: Chelicerata
- Class: Arachnida
- Order: Araneae
- Infraorder: Araneomorphae
- Family: Linyphiidae
- Genus: Bathyphantes; Menge, 1866

Type species
- B. gracilis (Blackwall, 1841)

Species
- 57, see text

Synonyms
- Bathyphantoides Kaston, 1948; Oreodia Hull, 1950

= Bathyphantes =

Genus of spiders

Bathyphantes is a genus of dwarf spiders that was first described by Anton Menge in 1866.

== Species ==
As of May 2019 it contains fifty-seven species and one subspecies:

- B. alameda Ivie, 1969 – USA, Canada
- B. alascensis (Banks, 1900) – USA, Canada
- B. alboventris (Banks, 1892) – USA, Canada
- B. approximatus (O. Pickard-Cambridge, 1871) – Europe, Caucasus, Russia (Europe to Middle Siberia)
- B. bishopi Ivie, 1969 – USA
- B. bohuensis Zhu & Zhou, 1983 – China
- B. brevipes (Emerton, 1917) – USA, Canada
- B. brevis (Emerton, 1911) – USA, Canada
- B. canadensis (Emerton, 1882) – Russia (Middle Siberia to Far East), Canada, USA
- B. chico Ivie, 1969 – USA
- B. diasosnemis Fage, 1929 – USA
- B. dubius Locket, 1968 – Angola
- B. eumenis (L. Koch, 1879) – USA (Alaska), Canada, Czech Rep., Poland, Finland, Russia (Europe to Far East), China
  - Bathyphantes e. buchari Ruzicka, 1988 – Central Europe
- B. fissidens Simon, 1902 – Argentina
- B. floralis Tu & Li, 2006 – Laos, Vietnam
- B. glacialis Caporiacco, 1935 – Karakorum
- Peaks large sheet weaver (B. gracilipes) van Helsdingen, 1977 – St. Helena
- B. gracilis (Blackwall, 1841) (type) – North America, Europe, Northern Africa, Turkey, Caucasus, Russia (Europe to Far East), Kazakhstan, China, Korea, Japan
- B. gulkana Ivie, 1969 – Russia (Far East), USA (Alaska), Canada
- Peaks small sheet weaver (B. helenae) van Helsdingen, 1977 – St. Helena
- B. hirsutus Locket, 1968 – Congo
- B. humilis (L. Koch, 1879) – Russia (Europe to Far East)
- B. iviei Holm, 1970 – USA (Alaska)
- B. jeniseicus Eskov, 1979 – Finland, Russia (West Siberia to Far East)
- B. keeni (Emerton, 1917) – Canada, USA
- B. larvarum Caporiacco, 1935 – Karakorum
- B. latescens (Chamberlin, 1919) – USA
- B. lennoxensis Simon, 1902 – Argentina
- B. mainlingensis Hu, 2001 – China
- B. malkini Ivie, 1969 – USA, Canada
- B. menyuanensis Hu, 2001 – China
- B. minor Millidge & Russell-Smith, 1992 – Borneo
- B. montanus Rainbow, 1912 – Australia (Queensland)
- B. nangqianensis Hu, 2001 – China
- B. nigrinus (Westring, 1851) – Europe, Russia (Europe to South Siberia)
- B. ohlerti Simon, 1884 – Poland
- B. orica Ivie, 1969 – USA, Canada
- B. pallidus (Banks, 1892) – USA, Canada
- B. paracymbialis Tanasevitch, 2014 – China, Laos, Myanmar, Thailand, Malaysia, Indonesia (Sumatra)
- B. paradoxus Berland, 1929 – Samoa
- B. parvulus (Westring, 1851) – Europe, Russia (Europe to Far East), China
- B. pogonias Kulczyński, 1885 – Russia (Far East), USA (Alaska)
- B. rainbowi Roewer, 1942 – Australia (Lord Howe Is.)
- B. reprobus (Kulczyński, 1916) – North America, Northern Europe, Russia (Europe to Far East)
- B. reticularis Caporiacco, 1935 – Karakorum
- B. robustus Oi, 1960 – Korea, Japan
- B. sarasini Berland, 1924 – New Caledonia
- B. setiger F. O. Pickard-Cambridge, 1894 – Europe, Russia (Europe to Far East)
- B. similis Kulczyński, 1894 – Europe, Turkey
- B. tagalogensis Barrion & Litsinger, 1995 – Philippines
- B. tongluensis Chen & Song, 1988 – China
- B. umiatus Ivie, 1969 – USA (Alaska)
- B. vittiger Simon, 1884 – France
- B. waneta Ivie, 1969 – USA, Canada
- B. weyeri (Emerton, 1875) – USA
- B. yodoensis Oi, 1960 – Korea, Japan
- B. yukon Ivie, 1969 – USA (Alaska)

== See also ==
- Pimoa
