= Carbinea =

Scientific classification
- Kingdom: Animalia
- Phylum: Arthropoda
- Subphylum: Chelicerata
- Class: Arachnida
- Order: Araneae
- Infraorder: Araneomorphae
- Family: Stiphidiidae
- Genus: Carbinea; Davies, 1999

Type species
- C. longiscapa Davies, 1999

Species
- 4, see text

Genus of spiders

Carbinea is a genus of Australian sheetweb spiders that was first described by V. T. Davies in 1999.

== Species ==
As of September 2019 it contains four species, found in Queensland:

- Carbinea breviscapa Davies, 1999 – Australia (Queensland)
- Carbinea longiscapa Davies, 1999 (type) – Australia (Queensland)
- Carbinea robertsi Davies, 1999 – Australia (Queensland)
- Carbinea wunderlichi Davies, 1999 – Australia (Queensland)
