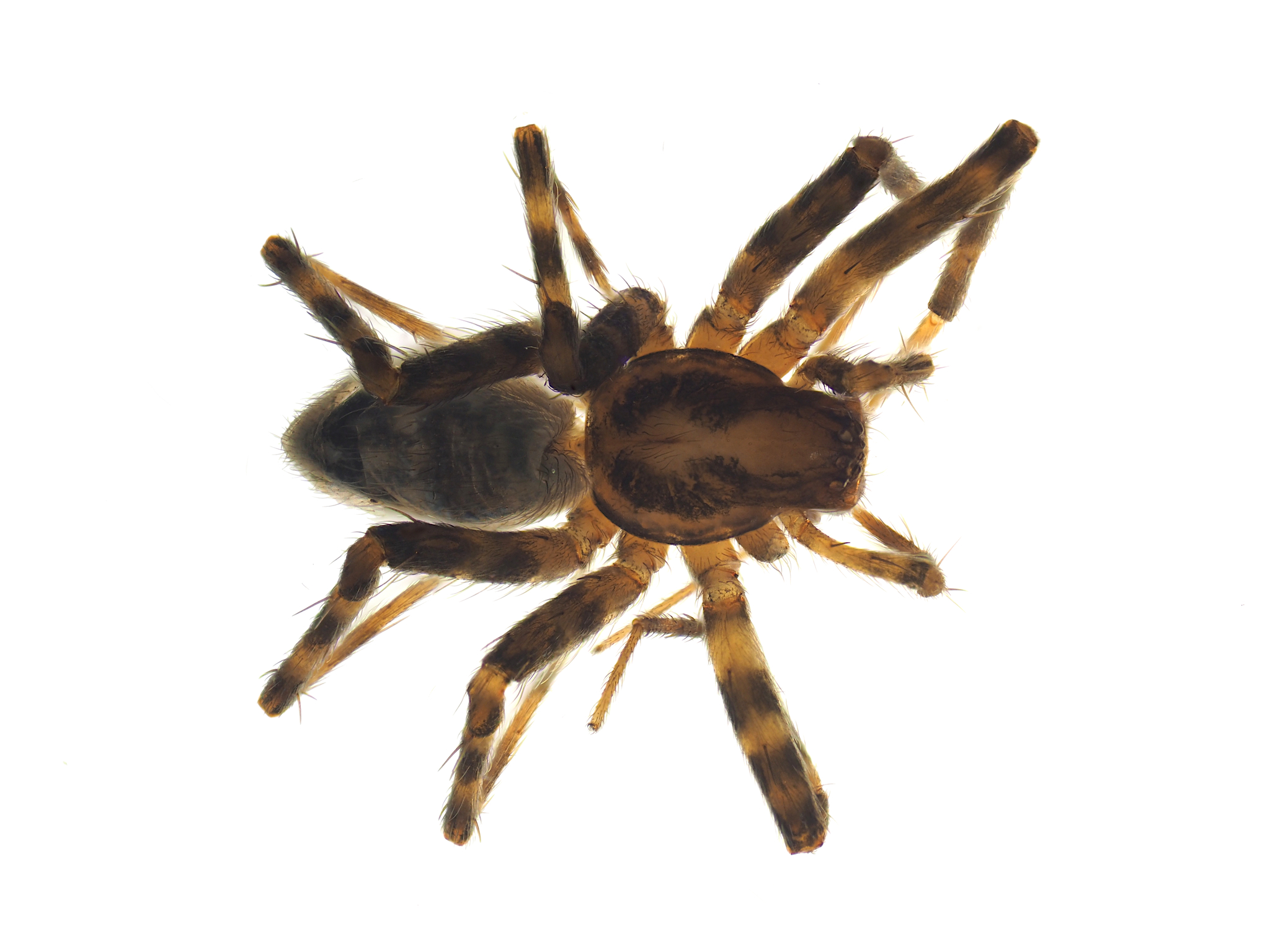

Scientific classification
- Kingdom: Animalia
- Phylum: Arthropoda
- Subphylum: Chelicerata
- Class: Arachnida
- Order: Araneae
- Infraorder: Araneomorphae
- Family: Stiphidiidae
- Genus: Malarina; Davies & Lambkin, 2000

Species
- 4, see text

= Malarina =

Genus of spiders

Malarina is a genus of Australian sheetweb spiders that was first described by V. T. Davies & C. L. Lambkin in 2000.

== Species ==
As of September 2019 it contains four species, all found in Queensland:

- Malarina cardwell Davies & Lambkin, 2000 – Australia (Queensland)
- Malarina collina Davies & Lambkin, 2000 – Australia (Queensland)
- Malarina masseyensis Davies & Lambkin, 2000 – Australia (Queensland)
- Malarina monteithi Davies & Lambkin, 2000 – Australia (Queensland)
