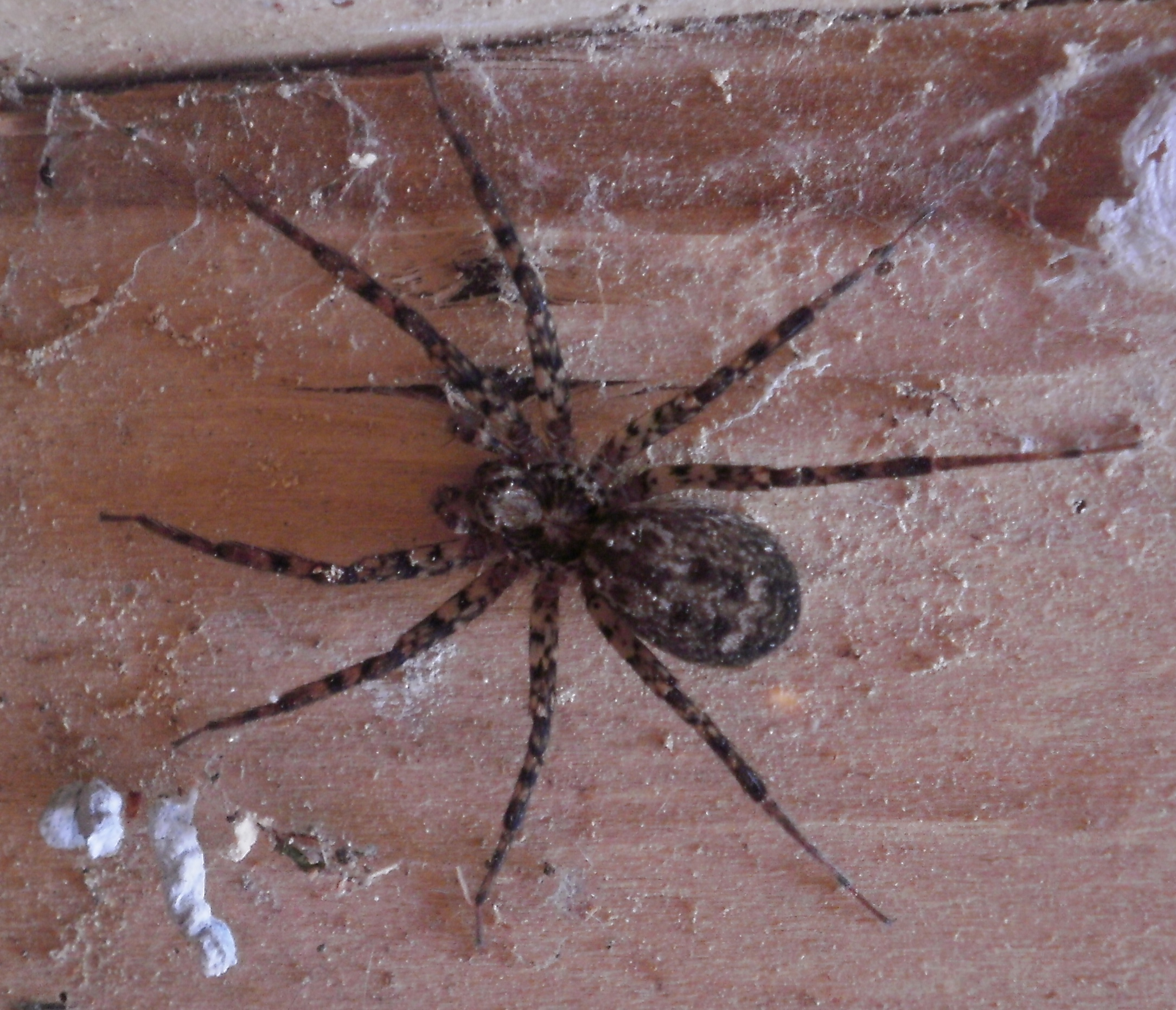
- Stiphidion facetum

Scientific classification
- Kingdom: Animalia
- Phylum: Arthropoda
- Subphylum: Chelicerata
- Class: Arachnida
- Order: Araneae
- Infraorder: Araneomorphae
- Family: Stiphidiidae; Dalmas, 1917

Diversity
- 20 genera, 125 species
- blue: reported countries (WSC) green: observation hotspots (iNaturalist)

= Stiphidiidae =

Sheetweb spiders

Family of spiders

Stiphidiidae, also called sheetweb spiders, is a family of araneomorph spiders first described in 1917. Most species are medium size (Stiphidion facetum is about 8 millimetres (0.31 in) long) and speckled brown with long legs. All members of this family occur in New Zealand and Australia except for Asmea. They build a horizontal sheet-like web under rocks, hence the name "sheetweb spiders".

== Genera ==
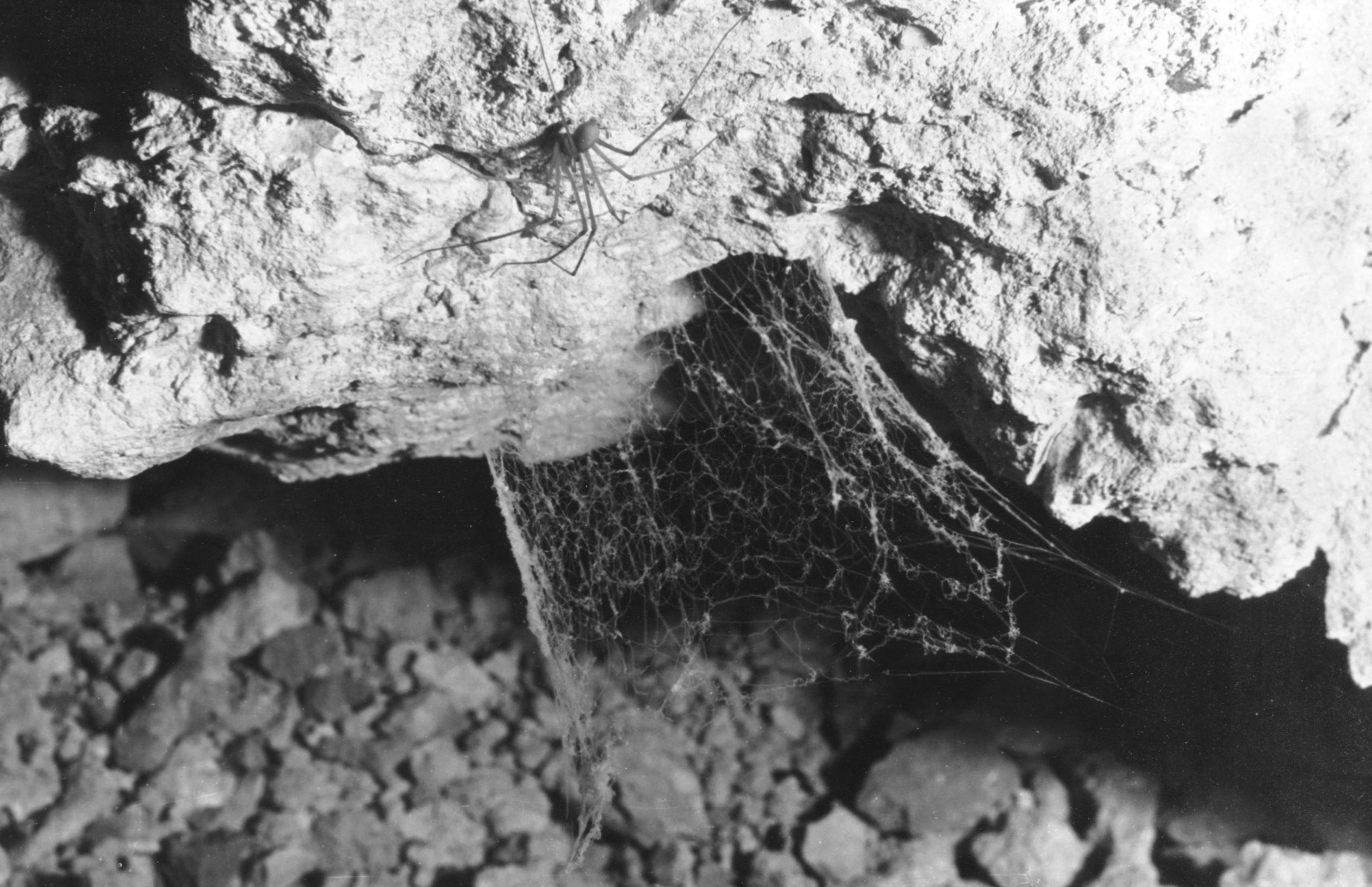
Tartarus mullamullangensis and sheet web

As of January 2026, this family includes twenty genera and 125 species:

- Aorangia Forster & Wilton, 1973 – New Zealand
- Asmea Gray & Smith, 2008 – New Guinea
- Borrala Gray & Smith, 2004 – Australia
- Carbinea Davies, 1999 – Australia
- Couranga Gray & Smith, 2008 – Australia
- Elleguna Gray & Smith, 2008 – Australia
- Jamberoo Gray & Smith, 2008 – Australia, Australian Capital Territory
- Kababina Davies, 1995 – Australia
- Karriella Gray & Smith, 2008 – Australia
- Malarina Davies & Lambkin, 2000 – Australia
- Marplesia Lehtinen, 1967 – New Zealand
- Neolana Forster & Wilton, 1973 – New Zealand
- Neoramia Forster & Wilton, 1973 – New Zealand
- Pillara Gray & Smith, 2004 – Australia
- Procambridgea Forster & Wilton, 1973 – Australia. Introduced to New Zealand
- Stiphidion Simon, 1902 – Australia. Introduced to New Zealand
- Tartarus Gray, 1973 – Australia
- Therlinya Gray & Smith, 2002 – Australia
- Tjurunga Lehtinen, 1967 – Australia
- Wabua Davies, 2000 – Australia
