= List of Cycloctenidae species =

This page lists all described species of the spider family Cycloctenidae accepted by the World Spider Catalog as of January 2021:

== Cycloctenus ==
Cycloctenus

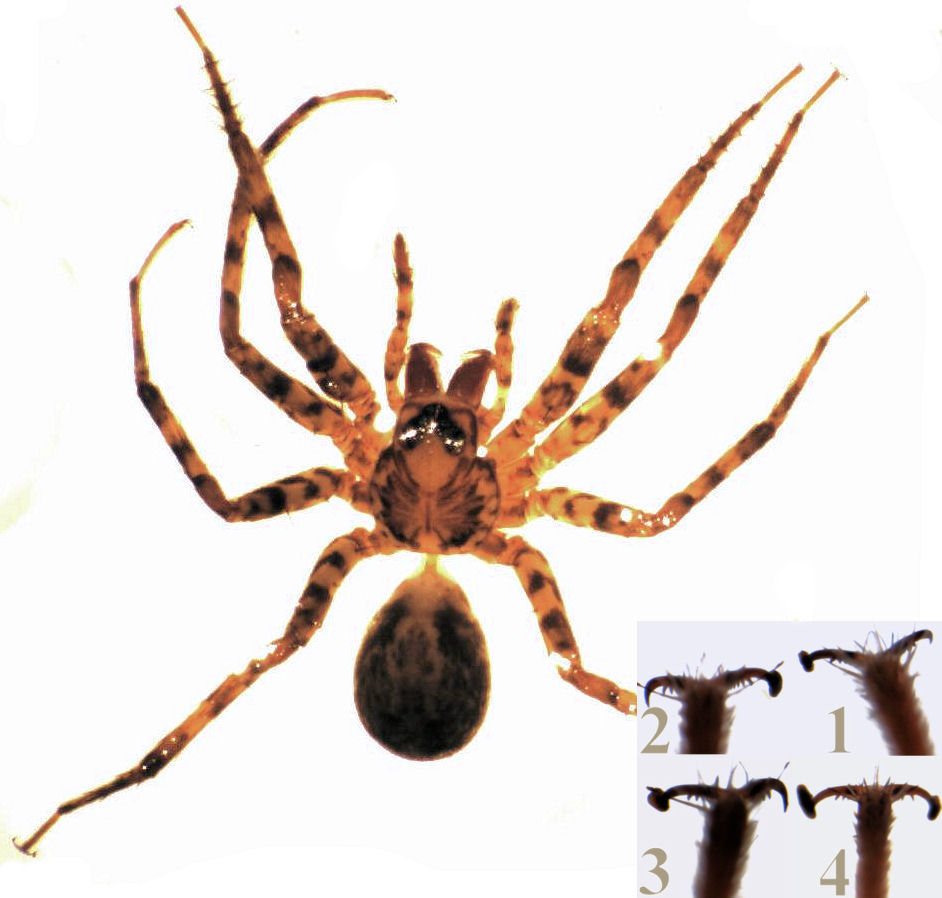
Cycloctenus, female

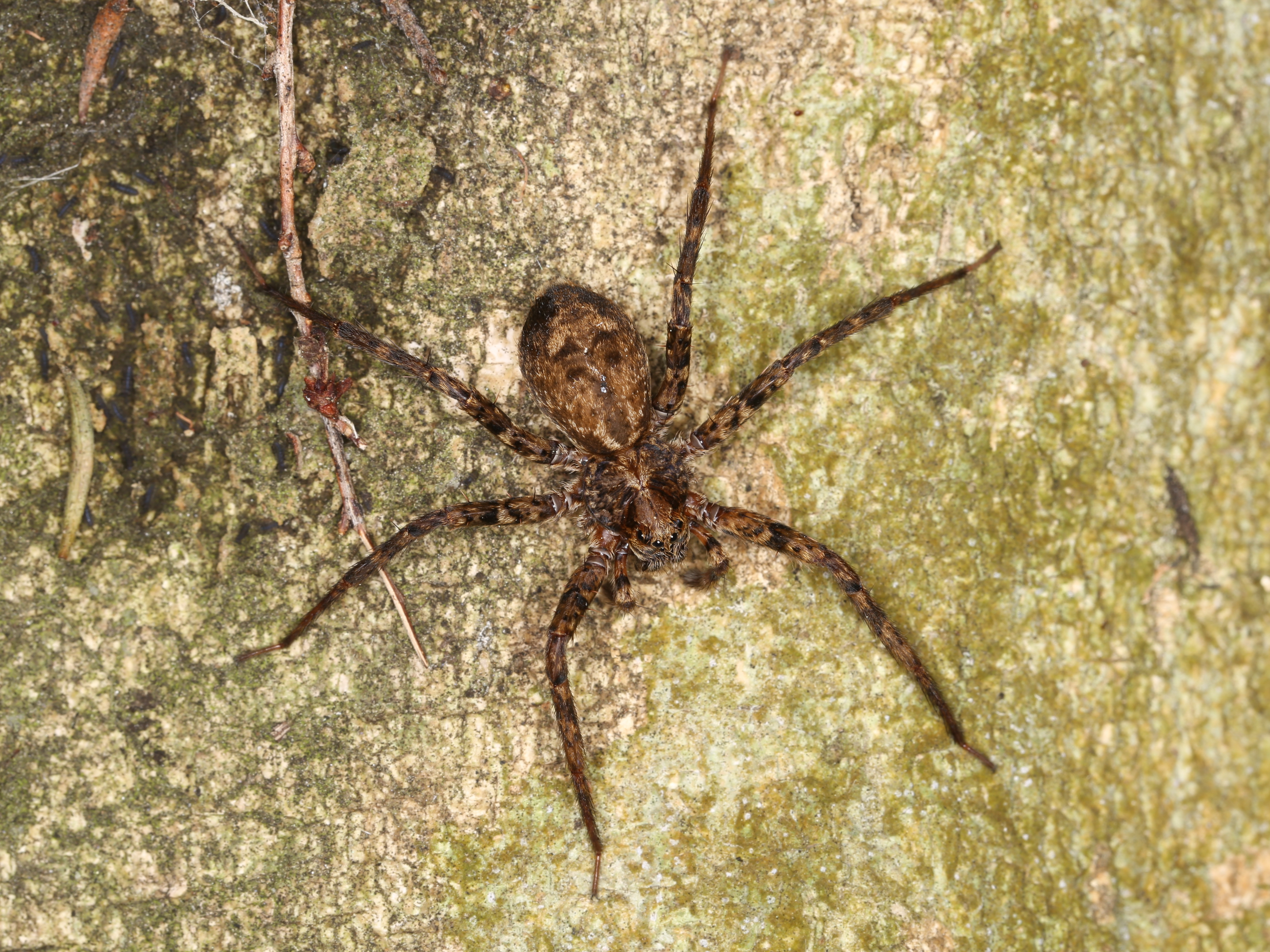
Cycloctenus sp.

Cycloctenus L. Koch, 1878

- C. abyssinus Urquhart, 1890 — Australia (New South Wales)
- C. agilis Forster, 1979 — New Zealand
- C. centralis Forster, 1979 — New Zealand
- C. cryptophilus Hickman, 1981 — Australia (Tasmania)
- C. duplex Forster, 1979 — New Zealand
- C. fiordensis Forster, 1979 — New Zealand
- C. flaviceps L. Koch, 1878 (type) — Australia
- C. flavus Hickman, 1981 — Australia (Tasmania)
- C. fugax Goyen, 1890 — New Zealand
- C. infrequens Hickman, 1981 — Australia (Tasmania)
- C. lepidus Urquhart, 1890 — New Zealand
- C. montivagus Hickman, 1981 — Australia (Tasmania)
- C. nelsonensis Forster, 1979 — New Zealand
- C. paturau Forster, 1979 — New Zealand
- C. pulcher Urquhart, 1891 — New Zealand
- C. robustus (L. Koch, 1878) — Australia (New South Wales)
- C. westlandicus Forster, 1964 — New Zealand

== Galliena ==
Galliena Simon, 1898

- G. montigena Simon, 1898 (type) — Indonesia (Java)

== Orepukia ==
Orepukia Forster & Wilton, 1973

- O. alta Forster & Wilton, 1973 — New Zealand
- O. catlinsensis Forster & Wilton, 1973 — New Zealand
- O. dugdalei Forster & Wilton, 1973 — New Zealand
- O. egmontensis Forster & Wilton, 1973 — New Zealand
- O. florae Forster & Wilton, 1973 — New Zealand
- O. geophila Forster & Wilton, 1973 — New Zealand
- O. grisea Forster & Wilton, 1973 — New Zealand
- O. insula Forster & Wilton, 1973 — New Zealand
- O. nota Forster & Wilton, 1973 — New Zealand
- O. nummosa (Hogg, 1909) — New Zealand
- O. orophila Forster & Wilton, 1973 — New Zealand
- O. pallida Forster & Wilton, 1973 — New Zealand
- O. poppelwelli Forster & Wilton, 1973 — New Zealand
- O. prina Forster & Wilton, 1973 — New Zealand
- O. rakiura Forster & Wilton, 1973 — New Zealand
- O. redacta Forster & Wilton, 1973 — New Zealand
- O. riparia Forster & Wilton, 1973 — New Zealand
- O. sabua Forster & Wilton, 1973 — New Zealand
- O. similis Forster & Wilton, 1973 — New Zealand
- O. simplex Forster & Wilton, 1973 — New Zealand
- O. sorenseni Forster & Wilton, 1973 (type) — New Zealand
- O. tanea Forster & Wilton, 1973 — New Zealand
- O. tonga Forster & Wilton, 1973 — New Zealand
- O. virtuta Forster & Wilton, 1973 — New Zealand

== Pakeha ==
Pakeha Forster & Wilton, 1973

- P. buechlerae Forster & Wilton, 1973 — New Zealand
- P. duplex Forster & Wilton, 1973 — New Zealand
- P. hiloa Forster & Wilton, 1973 — New Zealand
- P. inornata Forster & Wilton, 1973 — New Zealand
- P. insignita Forster & Wilton, 1973 — New Zealand
- P. kirki (Hogg, 1909) — New Zealand (Snares Is.)
- P. lobata Forster & Wilton, 1973 — New Zealand
- P. manapouri Forster & Wilton, 1973 — New Zealand
- P. maxima Forster & Wilton, 1973 — New Zealand
- P. media Forster & Wilton, 1973 — New Zealand
- P. minima Forster & Wilton, 1973 — New Zealand
- P. paratecta Forster & Wilton, 1973 — New Zealand
- P. parrotti Forster & Wilton, 1973 — New Zealand
- P. protecta Forster & Wilton, 1973 (type) — New Zealand
- P. pula Forster & Wilton, 1973 — New Zealand
- P. stewartia Forster & Wilton, 1973 — New Zealand
- P. subtecta Forster & Wilton, 1973 — New Zealand
- P. tecta Forster & Wilton, 1973 — New Zealand

== Paravoca ==
Paravoca Forster & Wilton, 1973

- P. opaca Forster & Wilton, 1973 — New Zealand
- P. otagoensis Forster & Wilton, 1973 (type) — New Zealand

== Plectophanes ==
Plectophanes Bryant, 1935

- P. altus Forster, 1964 — New Zealand
- P. archeyi Forster, 1964 — New Zealand
- P. frontalis Bryant, 1935 (type) — New Zealand
- P. hollowayae Forster, 1964 — New Zealand
- P. pilgrimi Forster, 1964 — New Zealand

== Toxopsiella ==
Toxopsiella Forster, 1964

- T. alpina Forster, 1964 — New Zealand
- T. australis Forster, 1964 — New Zealand
- T. centralis Forster, 1964 — New Zealand
- T. dugdalei Forster, 1964 — New Zealand
- T. horningi Forster, 1979 — New Zealand
- T. lawrencei Forster, 1964 (type) — New Zealand
- T. medialis Forster, 1964 — New Zealand
- T. minuta Forster, 1964 — New Zealand
- T. nelsonensis Forster, 1979 — New Zealand
- T. orientalis Forster, 1964 — New Zealand
- T. parrotti Forster, 1964 — New Zealand
- T. perplexa Forster, 1964 — New Zealand

== Uzakia ==
Uzakia Koçak & Kemal, 2008

- U. unica (Forster, 1970) (type) — New Zealand
