= Aorangia pilgrimi =

Conservation status
- Data Deficit (NZ TCS)

Scientific classification
- Kingdom: Animalia
- Phylum: Arthropoda
- Subphylum: Chelicerata
- Class: Arachnida
- Order: Araneae
- Infraorder: Araneomorphae
- Family: Stiphidiidae
- Genus: Aorangia
- Species: A. pilgrimi

Binomial name
- Aorangia pilgrimi Forster & Wilton, 1973

Species of spider

Aorangia pilgrimi is a species of Stiphidiidae that is endemic to New Zealand.

== Taxonomy ==
This species was described by Ray Forster and Cecil Wilton in 1973 from male and female specimens. It is named after Robert Pilgrim, a notable New Zealand entomologist. The holotype is stored in Canterbury Museum.

== Description ==
The male is recorded at 5.80mm in length whereas the female is 4.08mm. The carapace is coloured yellowish and has brown markings. The legs are yellowish and have brown bands. The abdomen is blackish brown.

== Distribution ==
This species is only known from Canterbury, New Zealand.

== Conservation status ==
Under the New Zealand Threat Classification System, this species is listed as "Data Deficient" with the qualifiers of "Data Poor: Size" and "Data Poor: Trend".
