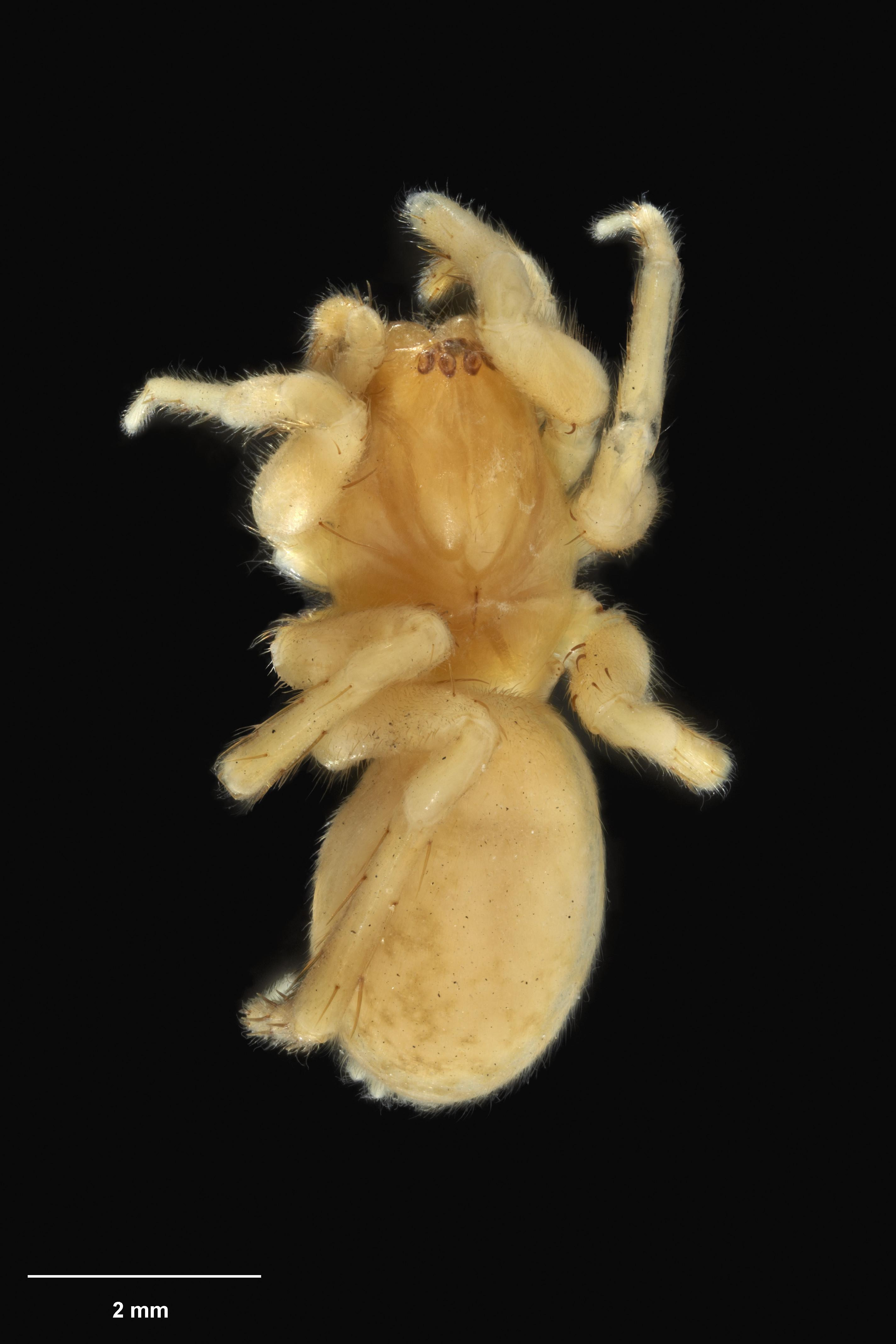

Conservation status
- Data Deficit (NZ TCS)

Scientific classification
- Kingdom: Animalia
- Phylum: Arthropoda
- Subphylum: Chelicerata
- Class: Arachnida
- Order: Araneae
- Infraorder: Araneomorphae
- Family: Cycloctenidae
- Genus: Orepukia
- Species: O. sabua

Binomial name
- Orepukia sabua Forster & Wilton, 1973

= Orepukia sabua =

Species of spider

Orepukia sabua is a species of Cycloctenidae that is endemic to New Zealand.

== Taxonomy ==
This species was described in 1973 by Ray Forster and Cecil Wilton from female specimens. The holotype is stored in Te Papa Museum under registration number AS.000100.

== Description ==
The female is recorded at 6.62mm in length. The carapace has brown bands dorsally. The legs are orange brown with darkish bands. The abdomen is pale yellow brown with brown mottling.

== Distribution ==
This species is only known from Nelson, New Zealand.

== Conservation status ==
Under the New Zealand Threat Classification System, this species is listed as "Data Deficient" with the qualifiers of "Data Poor: Size" and "Data Poor: Trend".
