= Orepukia dugdalei =

Conservation status
- Data Deficit (NZ TCS)

Scientific classification
- Kingdom: Animalia
- Phylum: Arthropoda
- Subphylum: Chelicerata
- Class: Arachnida
- Order: Araneae
- Infraorder: Araneomorphae
- Family: Cycloctenidae
- Genus: Orepukia
- Species: O. dugdalei

Binomial name
- Orepukia dugdalei Forster & Wilton, 1973

Species of spider

Orepukia dugdalei is a species of Cycloctenidae that is endemic to New Zealand.

== Taxonomy ==
This species was described in 1973 by Ray Forster and Cecil Wilton from female specimens. The holotype is stored in Otago Museum.

== Description ==
The female is recorded at 5.6mm in length. The carapace is coloured yellowish brown with dark markings dorsally. The legs are yellow. The abdomen is mottled grey and cream.

== Distribution ==
This species is only known from Canterbury and Kaikōura, New Zealand.

== Conservation status ==
Under the New Zealand Threat Classification System, this species is listed as "Data Deficient" with the qualifiers of "Data Poor: Size" and "Data Poor: Trend".
