= Toxopsiella minuta =

Conservation status
- Not Threatened (NZ TCS)

Scientific classification
- Kingdom: Animalia
- Phylum: Arthropoda
- Subphylum: Chelicerata
- Class: Arachnida
- Order: Araneae
- Infraorder: Araneomorphae
- Family: Cycloctenidae
- Genus: Toxopsiella
- Species: T. minuta

Binomial name
- Toxopsiella minuta Forster, 1964

Species of spider

Toxopsiella minuta is a species of Cycloctenidae spider endemic to New Zealand.

== Taxonomy ==
This species was described in 1964 by Ray Forster from female specimens. It was most recently revised in 1979, in which the male genitalia was described. The holotype is stored in Otago Museum.

== Description ==
The female is recorded at 4.14mm in length. The carapace is yellow brown with dark brown markings dorsally. The abdomen is grey with pale markings.

== Distribution ==
This species is only known from the South Island of New Zealand.

== Conservation status ==
Under the New Zealand Threat Classification System, this species is listed as "Not Threatened".
