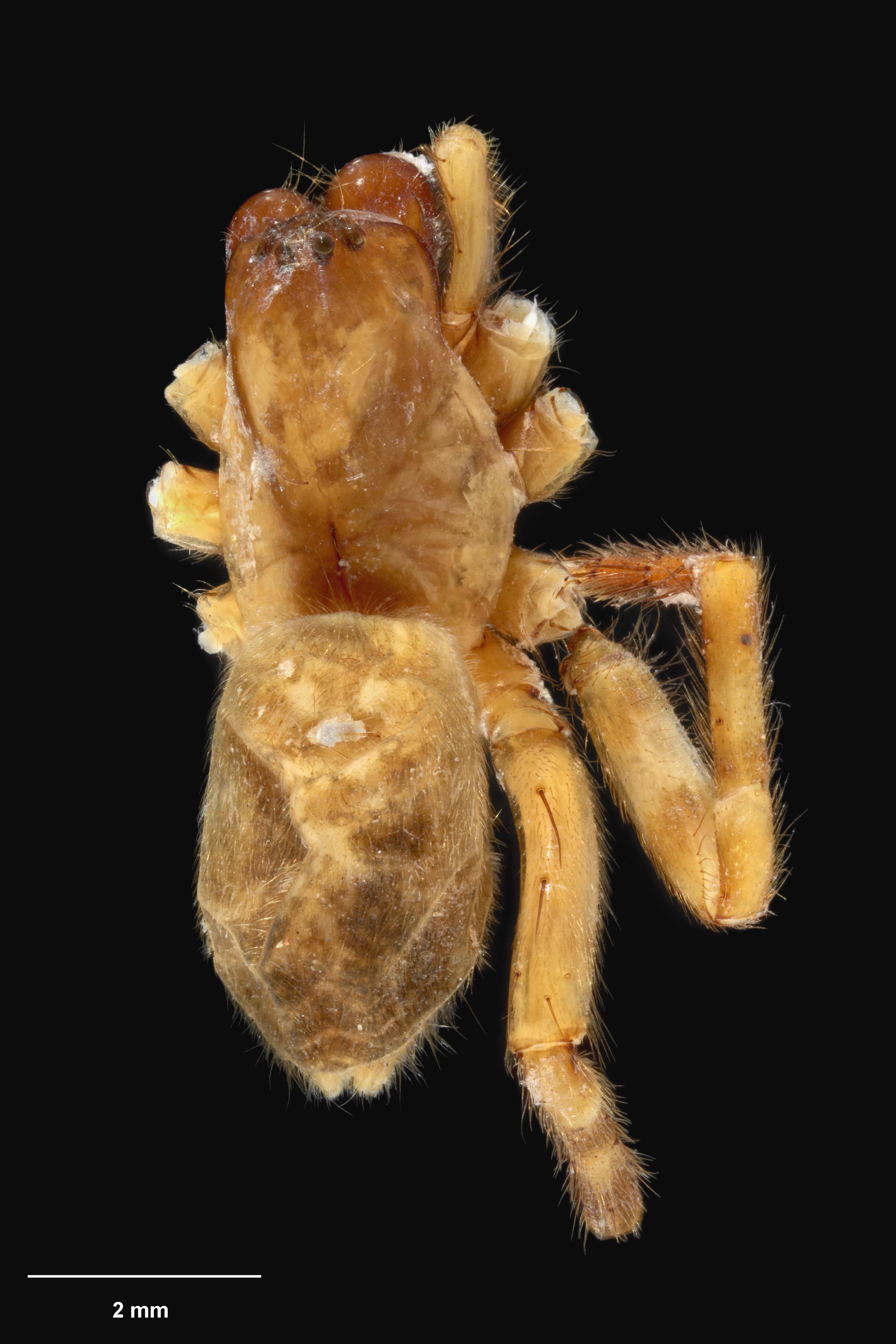

Conservation status
- Data Deficit (NZ TCS)

Scientific classification
- Kingdom: Animalia
- Phylum: Arthropoda
- Subphylum: Chelicerata
- Class: Arachnida
- Order: Araneae
- Infraorder: Araneomorphae
- Family: Cycloctenidae
- Genus: Orepukia
- Species: O. tanea

Binomial name
- Orepukia tanea Forster & Wilton, 1973

= Orepukia tanea =

Species of spider

Orepukia tanea is a species of Cycloctenidae that is endemic to New Zealand.

== Taxonomy ==
This species was described in 1973 by Ray Forster and Cecil Wilton from female specimens. The holotype is stored in Te Papa Museum under registration number AS.000116.

== Description ==
The female is recorded at 7.8mm in length. The carapace is coloured orange brown with dark brown markings dorsally. The legs are orange brown with dark bands. The abdomen is shaded black with some pale areas.

== Distribution ==
This species is only known from Fiordland, New Zealand.

== Conservation status ==
Under the New Zealand Threat Classification System, this species is listed as "Data Deficient" with the qualifiers of "Data Poor: Size", "Data Poor: Trend" and "One Location".
