= Orepukia virtuta =

Conservation status
- Data Deficit (NZ TCS)

Scientific classification
- Kingdom: Animalia
- Phylum: Arthropoda
- Subphylum: Chelicerata
- Class: Arachnida
- Order: Araneae
- Infraorder: Araneomorphae
- Family: Cycloctenidae
- Genus: Orepukia
- Species: O. virtuta

Binomial name
- Orepukia virtuta Forster & Wilton, 1973

Species of spider

Orepukia virtuta is a species of Cycloctenidae that is endemic to New Zealand.

== Taxonomy ==
This species was described in 1973 by Ray Forster and Cecil Wilton from male and female specimens. The holotype is stored in Otago Museum.

== Description ==
The male is recorded at 7.24mm in length whereas the female is 8.2mm. The carapace is coloured yellow brown with dark brown markings dorsally. The legs are yellow brown with dark bands. The abdomen is shaded black.

== Distribution ==
This species is only known from Westland, New Zealand.

== Conservation status ==
Under the New Zealand Threat Classification System, this species is listed as "Data Deficient" with the qualifiers of "Data Poor: Size" and "Data Poor: Trend".
