= Pakeha protecta =

Conservation status
- Not Threatened (NZ TCS)

Scientific classification
- Kingdom: Animalia
- Phylum: Arthropoda
- Subphylum: Chelicerata
- Class: Arachnida
- Order: Araneae
- Infraorder: Araneomorphae
- Family: Cycloctenidae
- Genus: Pakeha
- Species: P. protecta

Binomial name
- Pakeha protecta Forster & Wilton, 1973

Species of spider

Pakeha protecta is a species of Cycloctenidae spider that is endemic to New Zealand.

== Taxonomy ==
This species was described in 1973 by Ray Forster and Cecil Wilton from male and female specimens. The holotype is stored in Otago Museum. This is the type species for the genus Pakeha.

== Description ==
The male is recorded at 6.63mm in length whereas the female is 6.61mm. The carapace is coloured yellow brown with brown markings dorsally. The legs are yellowish brown with dark markings. The abdomen is shaded black.

== Distribution ==
This species is only known from Otago, New Zealand.

== Conservation status ==
Under the New Zealand Threat Classification System, this species is listed as "Not Threatened".
