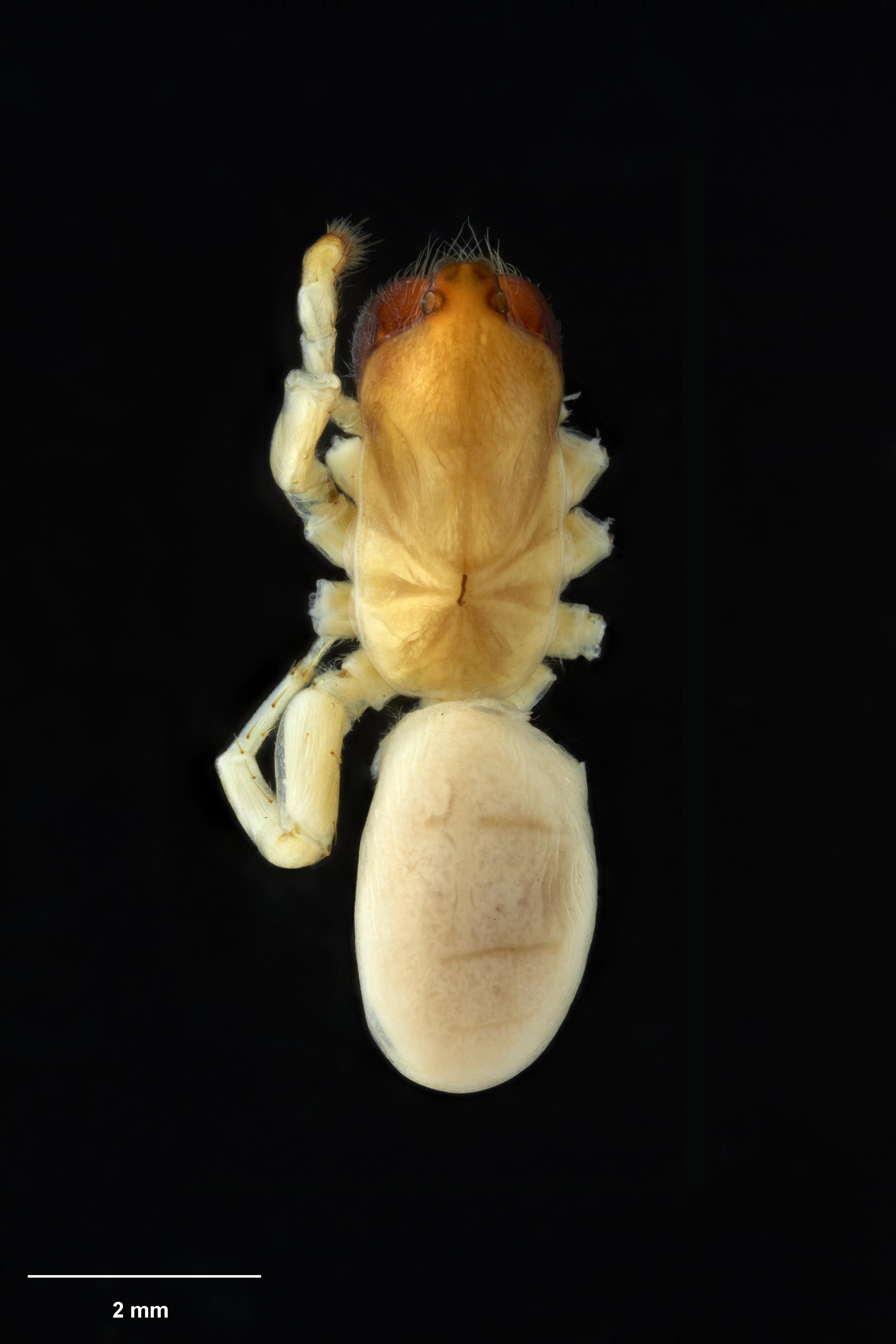

Conservation status
- Data Deficient (NZ TCS)

Scientific classification
- Kingdom: Animalia
- Phylum: Arthropoda
- Subphylum: Chelicerata
- Class: Arachnida
- Order: Araneae
- Infraorder: Araneomorphae
- Family: Cycloctenidae
- Genus: Plectophanes
- Species: P. hollowayae

Binomial name
- Plectophanes hollowayae Forster, 1964

= Plectophanes hollowayae =

Species of spider

Plectophanes hollowayae is a species of araneomorph spider in the family Cycloctenidae. This species is endemic to New Zealand and was first described by Ray Forster in 1964 and named in honour of Beverley Holloway. The holotype specimen was collected by Beverley Holloway and Richard Dell at Solomon Island, off Stewart Island, during the 1955 Dominion Museum expedition.

== Taxonomy ==
Plectophanes hollowayae is a member of the family Cycloctenidae. It was described by Ray Forster in 1964 and named in honour of one of the collectors, Beverly Holloway. Originally described in the family Toxopidae, Forster later transferred all members of the genus Plectophanes to Cycloctenidae. The original species name was Plectophanes hollowayi, but this was later corrected to P. hollowayae. Although the reason was not stated, it is assumed the change to an -ae ending was to align with standard procedure when a species is named after a female. The holotype specimen is held at Te Papa.

== Description ==
This species has eyes on a projection forward of the chelicerae, which is a typical feature for this genus. The colour of the carapace is red brown and the abdomen creamy white with a median band that expands into four faint chevrons. Forster stated that it most closely related to Plectophanes archeyi but can be distinguished by the form of the female epigynum and the arrangement of trichobothria on the legs. In P. hollowayae both the triangular projection of the epigynum and the epigynal depression are broader posteriorly than in P. archeyi. Plectophanes hollowayi has more trichobothria.

The male has not been described.

== Distribution ==
Plectophanes hollowayae has only been collected once from Solomon Island / Rerewhakaupoko, south-west of Stewart Island / Rakiura. This specimen, (the holotype) was collected by Beverley Holloway and Richard Dell during the 1955 Dominion Museum expedition.

== Conservation status ==
Plectophanes hollowayae has been assessed under the New Zealand Threat Classification System and categorised as Data Deficient (DD). It has also been given the qualifiers Data Poor Size (DPS), Data Poor Trend (DPT) and One Location (OL).
