= Pakeha minima =

Conservation status
- Not Threatened (NZ TCS)

Scientific classification
- Kingdom: Animalia
- Phylum: Arthropoda
- Subphylum: Chelicerata
- Class: Arachnida
- Order: Araneae
- Infraorder: Araneomorphae
- Family: Cycloctenidae
- Genus: Pakeha
- Species: P. minima

Binomial name
- Pakeha minima Forster & Wilton, 1973

Species of spider

Pakeha minima is a species in the spider family Cycloctenidae that is endemic to New Zealand.

== Taxonomy ==
This species was described in 1973 by Ray Forster and Cecil Wilton from male and female specimens. The holotype is stored in Otago Museum.

== Description ==
The male is recorded at 5.30mm in length whereas the female is 7.55mm.

== Distribution ==
This species is only known from Otago, New Zealand. It has been recorded at altitudes between 800' and 4500' (244-1372 m).

== Conservation status ==
Under the New Zealand Threat Classification System, this species is listed as "Not Threatened".
