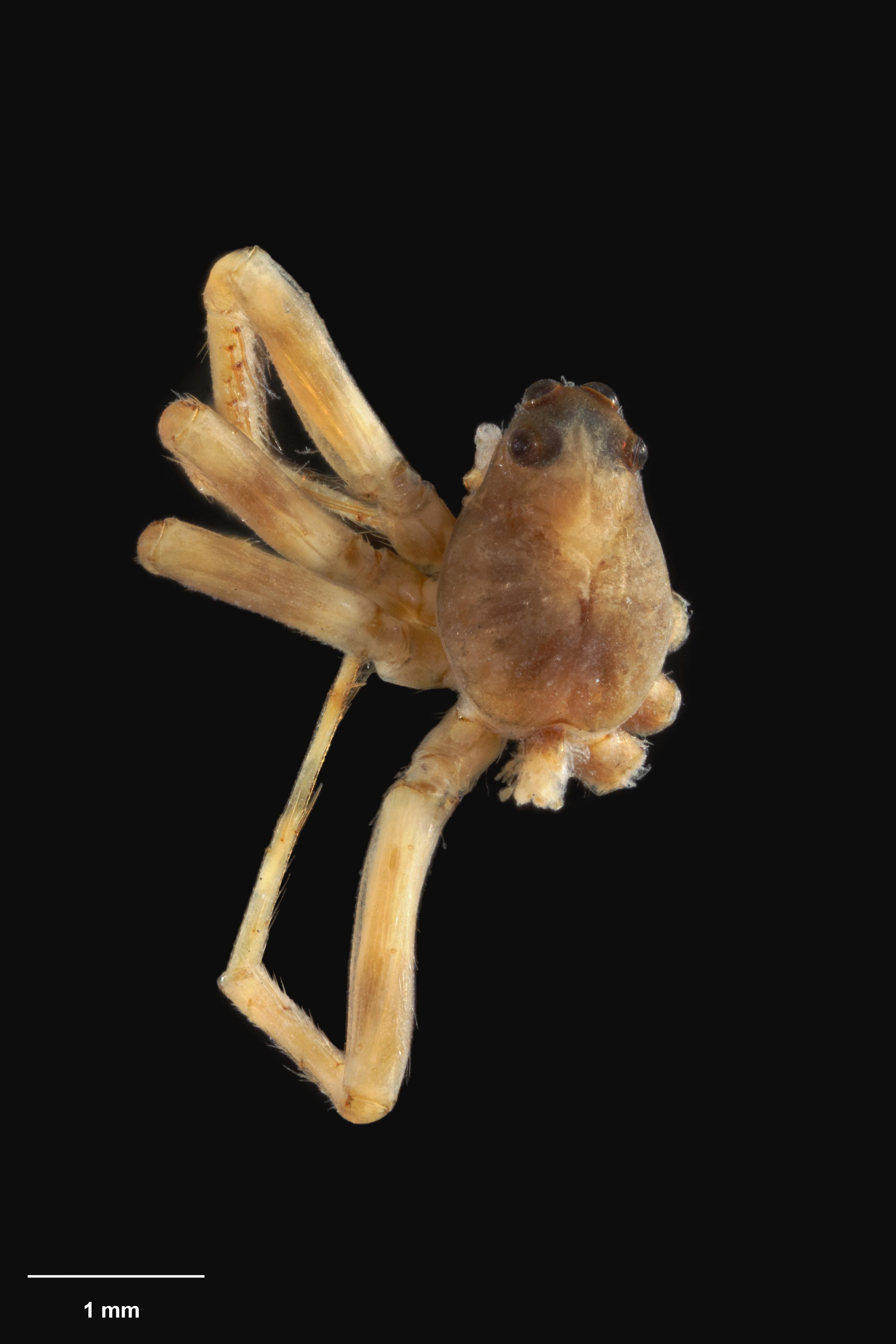

Conservation status
- Not Threatened (NZ TCS)

Scientific classification
- Kingdom: Animalia
- Phylum: Arthropoda
- Subphylum: Chelicerata
- Class: Arachnida
- Order: Araneae
- Infraorder: Araneomorphae
- Family: Cycloctenidae
- Genus: Toxopsiella
- Species: T. perplexa

Binomial name
- Toxopsiella perplexa Forster, 1964

= Toxopsiella perplexa =

Species of spider

Toxopsiella perplexa is a species of Cycloctenidae spider endemic to New Zealand.

== Taxonomy ==
This species was described in 1964 by Ray Forster from female specimens. It was most recently revised in 1979, in which the male was described. The holotype is stored Te Papa Museum under registration number AS.000083.

== Description ==
The male is recorded at 3.71mm in length The carapace is brown with pale markings dorsally. The abdomen is pale brown with reddish brown shading.

== Distribution ==
This species is known from the North Island and Marlborough region of New Zealand.

== Conservation status ==
Under the New Zealand Threat Classification System, this species is listed as "Not Threatened".
