= Toxopsiella nelsonensis =

Conservation status
- Not Threatened (NZ TCS)

Scientific classification
- Kingdom: Animalia
- Phylum: Arthropoda
- Subphylum: Chelicerata
- Class: Arachnida
- Order: Araneae
- Infraorder: Araneomorphae
- Family: Cycloctenidae
- Genus: Toxopsiella
- Species: T. nelsonensis

Binomial name
- Toxopsiella nelsonensis Forster, 1979

Species of spider

Toxopsiella nelsonensis is a species of Cycloctenidae spider endemic to New Zealand.

== Taxonomy ==
This species was described in 1979 by Ray Forster from male and female specimens. The holotype is stored in the New Zealand Arthropod Collection under registration number NZAC03014963.

== Description ==
The male is recorded at 4.7mm in length whereas the female is 7.1mm. The carapace has dark markings dorsally. The abdomen is mottled brown with dark markings dorsally.

== Distribution ==
This species is only known from Nelson and Marlborough in New Zealand.

== Conservation status ==
Under the New Zealand Threat Classification System, this species is listed as "Not Threatened".
