= Toxopsiella lawrencei =

Conservation status
- Not Threatened (NZ TCS)

Scientific classification
- Kingdom: Animalia
- Phylum: Arthropoda
- Subphylum: Chelicerata
- Class: Arachnida
- Order: Araneae
- Infraorder: Araneomorphae
- Family: Cycloctenidae
- Genus: Toxopsiella
- Species: T. lawrencei

Binomial name
- Toxopsiella lawrencei Forster, 1964

Species of spider

Toxopsiella lawrencei is a species of Cycloctenidae spider endemic to New Zealand.

== Taxonomy ==
This species was described in 1964 by Ray Forster from male and female specimens. It was most recently revised in 1979. It is the type specimen of the Toxopsiella genus. The holotype is stored in Otago Museum.

== Description ==
The male is recorded at 5.22mm in length whereas the female is 5.76mm. The carapace is dark brown with pale markings dorsally. The abdomen is mottled black and brown.

== Distribution ==
This species is only known from Otago and Southland in New Zealand.

== Conservation status ==
Under the New Zealand Threat Classification System, this species is listed as "Not Threatened".
