= Pakeha buechlerae =

Conservation status
- Not Threatened (NZ TCS)

Scientific classification
- Kingdom: Animalia
- Phylum: Arthropoda
- Subphylum: Chelicerata
- Class: Arachnida
- Order: Araneae
- Infraorder: Araneomorphae
- Family: Cycloctenidae
- Genus: Pakeha
- Species: P. buechlerae

Binomial name
- Pakeha buechlerae Forster & Wilton, 1973

Species of spider

Pakeha buechlerae is a species of cycloctenidae that is endemic to New Zealand.

== Taxonomy ==
This species was described in 1973 by Ray Forster and Cecil Wilton from female specimens. The holotype is stored in Otago Museum.

== Description ==
The female is recorded at 5.12mm in length. The carapace is coloured orange brown with black shading. The legs are orange brown. The abdomen is mottled greyish black and cream.

== Distribution ==
This species is only known from the Taranaki region and Waikato region near Te Aroha, in New Zealand.

== Conservation status ==
Under the New Zealand Threat Classification System, this species is listed as "Not Threatened".
