= Plectophanes pilgrimi =

Conservation status
- Data Deficit (NZ TCS)

Scientific classification
- Kingdom: Animalia
- Phylum: Arthropoda
- Subphylum: Chelicerata
- Class: Arachnida
- Order: Araneae
- Infraorder: Araneomorphae
- Family: Cycloctenidae
- Genus: Plectophanes
- Species: P. pilgrimi

Binomial name
- Plectophanes pilgrimi Forster, 1964

Species of spider

Plectophanes pilgrimi is a species of Cycloctenidae spider endemic to New Zealand.

== Taxonomy ==
This species was described in 1964 by Ray Forster from female specimens. It is named after Robert Pilgrim, a notable New Zealand entomologist. It was most recently revised in 1979. The holotype is stored in Canterbury Museum.

== Description ==
The female is recorded at 10.08mm in length. The carapace is brown. The abdomen is creamy white chevron patterns dorsally.

== Distribution ==
This species is only known from Canterbury and Westland in New Zealand.

== Conservation status ==
Under the New Zealand Threat Classification System, this species is listed as "Data Deficient" with the qualifiers of "Data Poor: Size" and "Data Poor: Trend".
