= Toxopsiella horningi =

Conservation status
- Naturally Uncommon (NZ TCS)

Scientific classification
- Kingdom: Animalia
- Phylum: Arthropoda
- Subphylum: Chelicerata
- Class: Arachnida
- Order: Araneae
- Infraorder: Araneomorphae
- Family: Cycloctenidae
- Genus: Toxopsiella
- Species: T. horningi

Binomial name
- Toxopsiella horningi Forster, 1979

Species of spider

Toxopsiella horningi is a species of Cycloctenidae spider endemic to New Zealand.

== Taxonomy ==
This species was described in 1979 by Ray Forster from male and female specimens. The holotype is stored in the New Zealand Arthropod Collection under registration number NZAC03014962.

== Description ==
The male is recorded at 8.1mm in length whereas the female is 11.3mm. The abdomen is shaded with dark brown.

== Distribution ==
This species is only known from Snares Island in New Zealand.

== Conservation status ==
Under the New Zealand Threat Classification System, this species is listed as "Naturally Uncommon" with the qualifiers of "Island Endemic" and "One Location".
