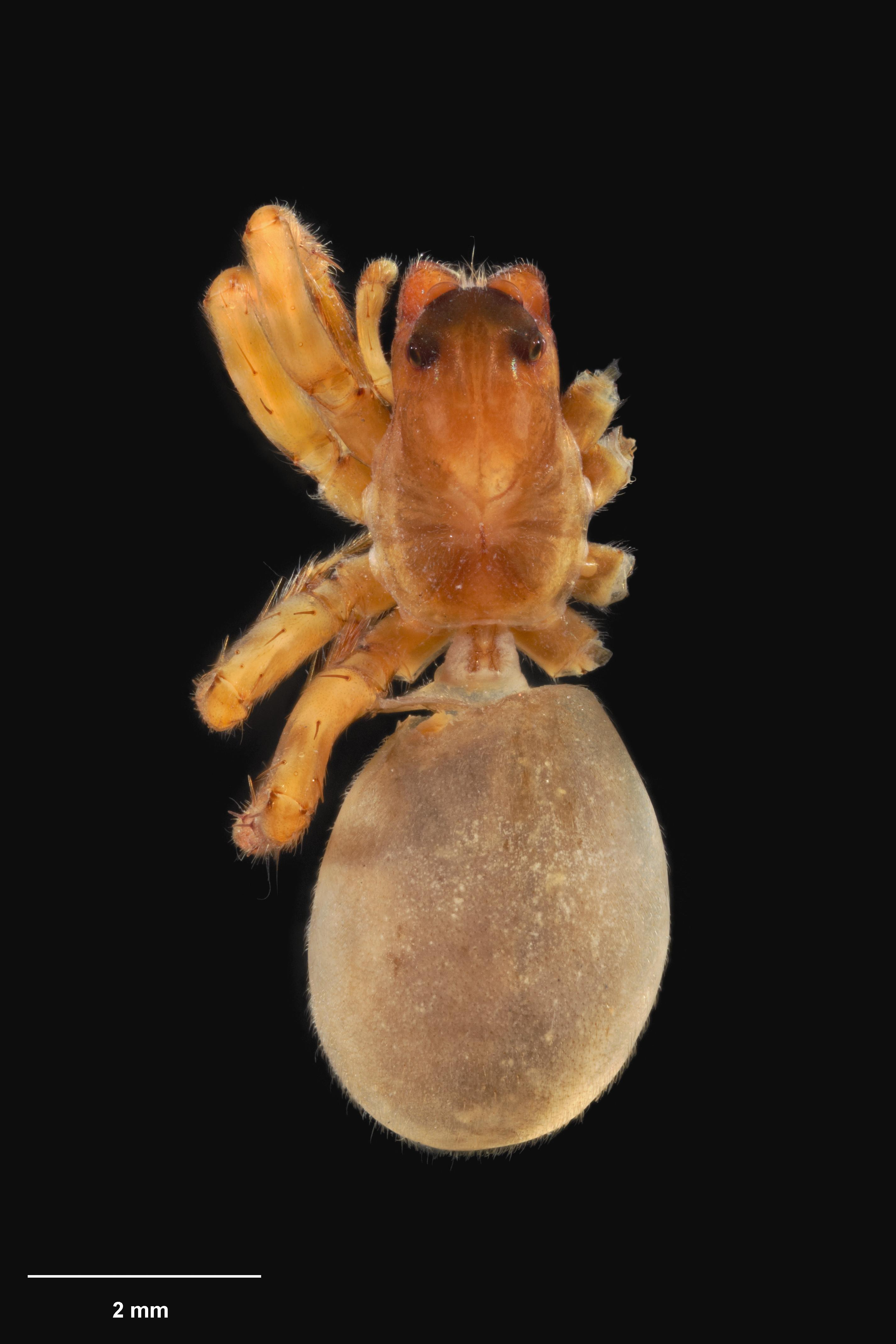

Conservation status
- Not Threatened (NZ TCS)

Scientific classification
- Kingdom: Animalia
- Phylum: Arthropoda
- Subphylum: Chelicerata
- Class: Arachnida
- Order: Araneae
- Infraorder: Araneomorphae
- Family: Cycloctenidae
- Genus: Toxopsiella
- Species: T. medialis

Binomial name
- Toxopsiella medialis Forster, 1964

= Toxopsiella medialis =

Species of spider

Toxopsiella medialis is a species of Cycloctenidae spider endemic to New Zealand.

== Taxonomy ==
This species was described in 1964 by Ray Forster from male and female specimens. It was most recently revised in 1979. The holotype is stored in Te Papa Museum under registration number AS.000067.

== Description ==
The male is recorded at 5.79mm in length whereas the female is 6.75mm. This carapace is dark brown with a pale marking dorsally. The abdomen is brown.

== Distribution ==
This species is only known from Wellington and Marlborough in New Zealand.

== Conservation status ==
Under the New Zealand Threat Classification System, this species is listed as "Not Threatened".
