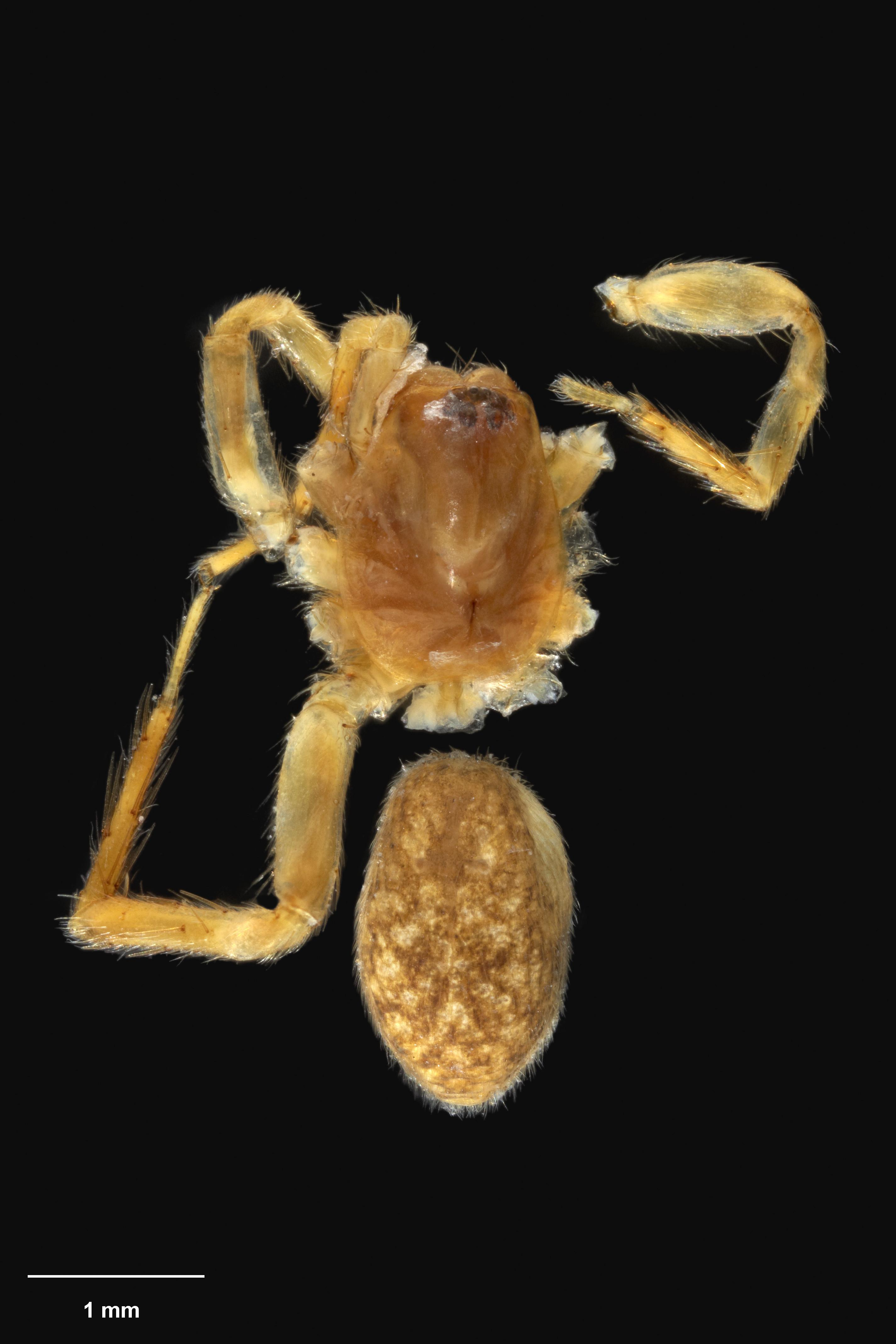

Conservation status
- Data Deficit (NZ TCS)

Scientific classification
- Kingdom: Animalia
- Phylum: Arthropoda
- Subphylum: Chelicerata
- Class: Arachnida
- Order: Araneae
- Infraorder: Araneomorphae
- Family: Cycloctenidae
- Genus: Pakeha
- Species: P. hiloa

Binomial name
- Pakeha hiloa Forster & Wilton, 1973

= Pakeha hiloa =

Species of spider

Pakeha hiloa is a species of Cycloctenidae that is endemic to New Zealand.

== Taxonomy ==
This species was described in 1973 by Ray Forster and Cecil Wilton from a female specimen. The holotype is stored in Te Papa Museum under registration number AS.000040.

== Description ==
The female is recorded at 3.48mm in length. The cephalothorax and legs are coloured dark reddish brown. The abdomen is shaded blackish brown. The male has not been described.

== Distribution ==
This species is only known from the Gisborne region of New Zealand.

== Conservation status ==
Under the New Zealand Threat Classification System, this species is listed as "Data Deficient" with the qualifiers of "Data Poor: Size", "Data Poor: Trend" and "One Location".
