= Pakeha paratecta =

Conservation status
- Not Threatened (NZ TCS)

Scientific classification
- Kingdom: Animalia
- Phylum: Arthropoda
- Subphylum: Chelicerata
- Class: Arachnida
- Order: Araneae
- Infraorder: Araneomorphae
- Family: Cycloctenidae
- Genus: Pakeha
- Species: P. paratecta

Binomial name
- Pakeha paratecta Forster & Wilton, 1973

Species of spider

Pakeha paratecta is a species of Cycloctenidae spider that is endemic to New Zealand.

== Taxonomy ==
This species was described in 1973 by Ray Forster and Cecil Wilton from female specimens. The holotype is stored in Otago Museum.

== Description ==
The female is recorded at 3mm in length. The cephalothorax and legs are coloured reddish brown. The abdomen has a reticulate blackish brown colour with a chevron pattern dorsally.

== Distribution ==
This species is only known from Southland and Stewart Island, New Zealand.

== Conservation status ==
Under the New Zealand Threat Classification System, this species is listed as "Not Threatened".
