= Pakeha insignita =

Conservation status
- Naturally Uncommon (NZ TCS)

Scientific classification
- Kingdom: Animalia
- Phylum: Arthropoda
- Subphylum: Chelicerata
- Class: Arachnida
- Order: Araneae
- Infraorder: Araneomorphae
- Family: Cycloctenidae
- Genus: Pakeha
- Species: P. insignita

Binomial name
- Pakeha insignita Forster & Wilton, 1973

Species of spider

Pakeha insignita is a species of Cycloctenidae spider that is endemic to New Zealand.

== Taxonomy ==
This species was described in 1973 by Ray Forster and Cecil Wilton from female and male specimens. The holotype is stored in Otago Museum.

== Description ==
The female is recorded at 6.09 mm (0.240 in) in length whereas the male is 4.69 mm (0.185 in). The carapace is coloured yellow brown and shaded black. The legs are banded. The abdomen is mottled black.

== Distribution ==
This species is only known from Southland, New Zealand.

== Conservation status ==
Under the New Zealand Threat Classification System, this species is listed as "Naturally Uncommon" with the qualifiers of "Data Poor: Size" and "Data Poor: Trend".
