= Toxopsiella orientalis =

Conservation status
- Not Threatened (NZ TCS)

Scientific classification
- Kingdom: Animalia
- Phylum: Arthropoda
- Subphylum: Chelicerata
- Class: Arachnida
- Order: Araneae
- Infraorder: Araneomorphae
- Family: Cycloctenidae
- Genus: Toxopsiella
- Species: T. orientalis

Binomial name
- Toxopsiella orientalis Forster, 1964

Species of spider

Toxopsiella orientalis is a species of Cycloctenidae spider endemic to New Zealand.

== Taxonomy ==
This species was described in 1964 by Ray Forster from male and female specimens. It was most recently revised in 1979, in which the male was described. The holotype is stored in Otago Museum.

== Description ==
The male is recorded at 8.08mm in length whereas the female is 8.46mm. The carapace is brown with pale markings dorsally. The abdomen is brown with pale markings dorsally.

== Distribution ==
This species is only known from Otago and Southland in New Zealand.

== Conservation status ==
Under the New Zealand Threat Classification System, this species is listed as "Not Threatened".
