= Pakeha stewartia =

Conservation status
- Data Deficit (NZ TCS)

Scientific classification
- Kingdom: Animalia
- Phylum: Arthropoda
- Subphylum: Chelicerata
- Class: Arachnida
- Order: Araneae
- Infraorder: Araneomorphae
- Family: Cycloctenidae
- Genus: Pakeha
- Species: P. stewartia

Binomial name
- Pakeha stewartia Forster & Wilton, 1973

Species of spider

Pakeha stewartia is a species of Cycloctenidae spider that is endemic to New Zealand.

== Taxonomy ==
This species was described in 1973 by Ray Forster and Cecil Wilton from female specimens. The holotype is stored in Otago Museum.

== Description ==
The female is recorded at 7.42mm in length. The carapace is coloured reddish brown. The legs are orange brown. The abdomen is pale brown with dark markings dorsally.

== Distribution ==
This species is only known from Stewart Island and Southland in New Zealand.

== Conservation status ==
Under the New Zealand Threat Classification System, this species is listed as "Data Deficient" with the qualifiers of "Data Poor: Size", "Data Poor: Trend" and "One Location".
