= Plectophanes frontalis =

Conservation status
- Not Threatened (NZ TCS)

Scientific classification
- Kingdom: Animalia
- Phylum: Arthropoda
- Subphylum: Chelicerata
- Class: Arachnida
- Order: Araneae
- Infraorder: Araneomorphae
- Family: Cycloctenidae
- Genus: Plectophanes
- Species: P. frontalis

Binomial name
- Plectophanes frontalis Bryant, 1935

Species of spider

Plectophanes frontalis is a species of Cycloctenidae spider endemic to New Zealand.

== Taxonomy ==
This species was described in 1935 by Elizabeth Bryant from female specimens. It was revised in 1964, in which the male was described. It was most recently revised in 1979. The holotype is stored in Canterbury Museum.

== Description ==
The male is recorded at 6.66mm in length whereas the female is 8.64mm. This species has a dark brown carapace. The abdomen has dark brown markings dorsally.

== Distribution ==
This species is only known from the North Island of New Zealand.

== Conservation status ==
Under the New Zealand Threat Classification System, this species is listed as "Not Threatened".
