= Paravoca opaca =

Conservation status
- Not Threatened (NZ TCS)

Scientific classification
- Kingdom: Animalia
- Phylum: Arthropoda
- Subphylum: Chelicerata
- Class: Arachnida
- Order: Araneae
- Infraorder: Araneomorphae
- Family: Cycloctenidae
- Genus: Paravoca
- Species: P. opaca

Binomial name
- Paravoca opaca Forster & Wilton, 1973

Species of spider

Paravoca opaca is a species of Cycloctenidae spider that is endemic to New Zealand.

== Taxonomy ==
This species was described in 1973 by Ray Forster and Cecil Wilton from male and female specimens. The holotype is stored in Otago Museum.

== Description ==
The male is recorded at 6.63mm in length whereas the female is 7.34mm. The carapace is coloured yellow brown with dark reddish brown markings dorsally. The legs are yellow brown with dark markings. The abdomen is creamy with a chevron pattern dorsally.

== Distribution ==
This species is only known from Fiordland, New Zealand.

== Conservation status ==
Under the New Zealand Threat Classification System, this species is listed as "Not Threatened".
