= Paravoca otagoensis =

Conservation status
- Not Threatened (NZ TCS)

Scientific classification
- Kingdom: Animalia
- Phylum: Arthropoda
- Subphylum: Chelicerata
- Class: Arachnida
- Order: Araneae
- Infraorder: Araneomorphae
- Family: Cycloctenidae
- Genus: Paravoca
- Species: P. otagoensis

Binomial name
- Paravoca otagoensis Forster & Wilton, 1973

Species of spider

Paravoca otagoensis is a species of Cycloctenidae spider that is endemic to New Zealand.

== Taxonomy ==
This species was described in 1973 by Ray Forster and Cecil Wilton from male and female specimens. The holotype is stored in Otago Museum.

== Description ==
The male is recorded at 5.25mm in length whereas the female is 5.30mm. The carapace is coloured reddish brown with pale markings dorsally. The legs are yellow brown. The abdomen is pale brown with various markings dorsally.

== Distribution ==
This species is only known from Otago, New Zealand.

== Conservation status ==
Under the New Zealand Threat Classification System, this species is listed as "Not Threatened".
