= Toxopsiella parrotti =

Conservation status
- Not Threatened (NZ TCS)

Scientific classification
- Kingdom: Animalia
- Phylum: Arthropoda
- Subphylum: Chelicerata
- Class: Arachnida
- Order: Araneae
- Infraorder: Araneomorphae
- Family: Cycloctenidae
- Genus: Toxopsiella
- Species: T. parrotti

Binomial name
- Toxopsiella parrotti Forster, 1964

Species of spider

Toxopsiella parrotti is a species of Cycloctenidae spider endemic to New Zealand.

== Taxonomy ==
This species was described in 1964 by Ray Forster from female specimens. It was most recently revised in 1979, in which the male was described. The holotype is stored in Otago Museum.

== Description ==
The female is recorded at 6.48mm in length. The carapace is dark brown with pale markings dorsally. The abdomen is mottled brown.

== Distribution ==
This species is only known from the South Island of New Zealand.

== Conservation status ==
Under the New Zealand Threat Classification System, this species is listed as "Not Threatened".
