= Toxopsiella alpina =

Conservation status
- Data Deficit (NZ TCS)

Scientific classification
- Kingdom: Animalia
- Phylum: Arthropoda
- Subphylum: Chelicerata
- Class: Arachnida
- Order: Araneae
- Infraorder: Araneomorphae
- Family: Cycloctenidae
- Genus: Toxopsiella
- Species: T. alpina

Binomial name
- Toxopsiella alpina Forster, 1964

Species of spider

Toxopsiella alpina is a species of Cycloctenidae spider endemic to New Zealand.

== Taxonomy ==
This species was described in 1964 by Ray Forster from female specimens. It was most recently revised in 1979. The holotype is stored in Canterbury Museum.

== Description ==
The female is recorded at 6.91mm in length. This species has a pale yellow cephalothorax. The abdomen is pale and has dark markings dorsally.

== Distribution ==
This species is only known from Canterbury, New Zealand.

== Conservation status ==
Under the New Zealand Threat Classification System, this species is listed as "Data Deficient" with the qualifiers of "Data Poor Size", "Data Poor: Trend" and "One Location".
