= Orepukia nota =

Conservation status
- Not Threatened (NZ TCS)

Scientific classification
- Kingdom: Animalia
- Phylum: Arthropoda
- Subphylum: Chelicerata
- Class: Arachnida
- Order: Araneae
- Infraorder: Araneomorphae
- Family: Cycloctenidae
- Genus: Orepukia
- Species: O. nota

Binomial name
- Orepukia nota Forster & Wilton, 1973

Species of spider

Orepukia nota is a species of Cycloctenidae that is endemic to New Zealand.

== Taxonomy ==
This species was described in 1973 by Ray Forster and Cecil Wilton from male and female specimens. The holotype is stored in Otago Museum.

== Description ==
The male is recorded at 7.46mm in length whereas the female is 7.44mm. The carapace is coloured dark brown with pale yellow areas dorsally. The legs are orange brown with dark bands. The abdomen is shaded black brown with pale markings dorsally.

== Distribution ==
This species is only known from Fiordland, New Zealand.

== Conservation status ==
Under the New Zealand Threat Classification System, this species is listed as "Not Threatened".
