= Orepukia tonga =

Conservation status
- Data Deficit (NZ TCS)

Scientific classification
- Kingdom: Animalia
- Phylum: Arthropoda
- Subphylum: Chelicerata
- Class: Arachnida
- Order: Araneae
- Infraorder: Araneomorphae
- Family: Cycloctenidae
- Genus: Orepukia
- Species: O. tonga

Binomial name
- Orepukia tonga Forster & Wilton, 1973

Species of spider

Orepukia tonga is a species of Cycloctenidae that is endemic to New Zealand.

== Taxonomy ==
This species was described in 1973 by Ray Forster and Cecil Wilton from a female specimen. The holotype is stored in Otago Museum.

== Description ==
The female is recorded at 5.8mm in length. The carapace is partly coloured reddish brown. The legs are orange brown and darken towards the apex. The abdomen is brown and covered with black markings.

== Distribution ==
This species is only known from Tongariro National Park, New Zealand.

== Conservation status ==
Under the New Zealand Threat Classification System, this species is listed as "Data Deficient" with the qualifiers of "Data Poor: Size", "Data Poor: Trend" and "One Location".
