= Orepukia grisea =

Conservation status
- Data Deficit (NZ TCS)

Scientific classification
- Kingdom: Animalia
- Phylum: Arthropoda
- Subphylum: Chelicerata
- Class: Arachnida
- Order: Araneae
- Infraorder: Araneomorphae
- Family: Cycloctenidae
- Genus: Orepukia
- Species: O. grisea

Binomial name
- Orepukia grisea Forster & Wilton, 1973

Species of spider

Orepukia grisea is a species of Cycloctenidae that is endemic to New Zealand.

== Taxonomy ==
This species was described in 1973 by Ray Forster and Cecil Wilton from a female specimen. The holotype is stored in Canterbury Museum.

== Description ==
The female is recorded at 6.6mm in length. The carapace is coloured pale brown with brown bands dorsally. The legs are yellow brown with dark bands. The abdomen is cream with pale brown markings dorsally.

== Distribution ==
This species is only known from Canterbury, New Zealand.

== Conservation status ==
Under the New Zealand Threat Classification System, this species is listed as "Data Deficient" with the qualifiers of "Data Poor: Size", "Data Poor: Trend" and "One Location".
