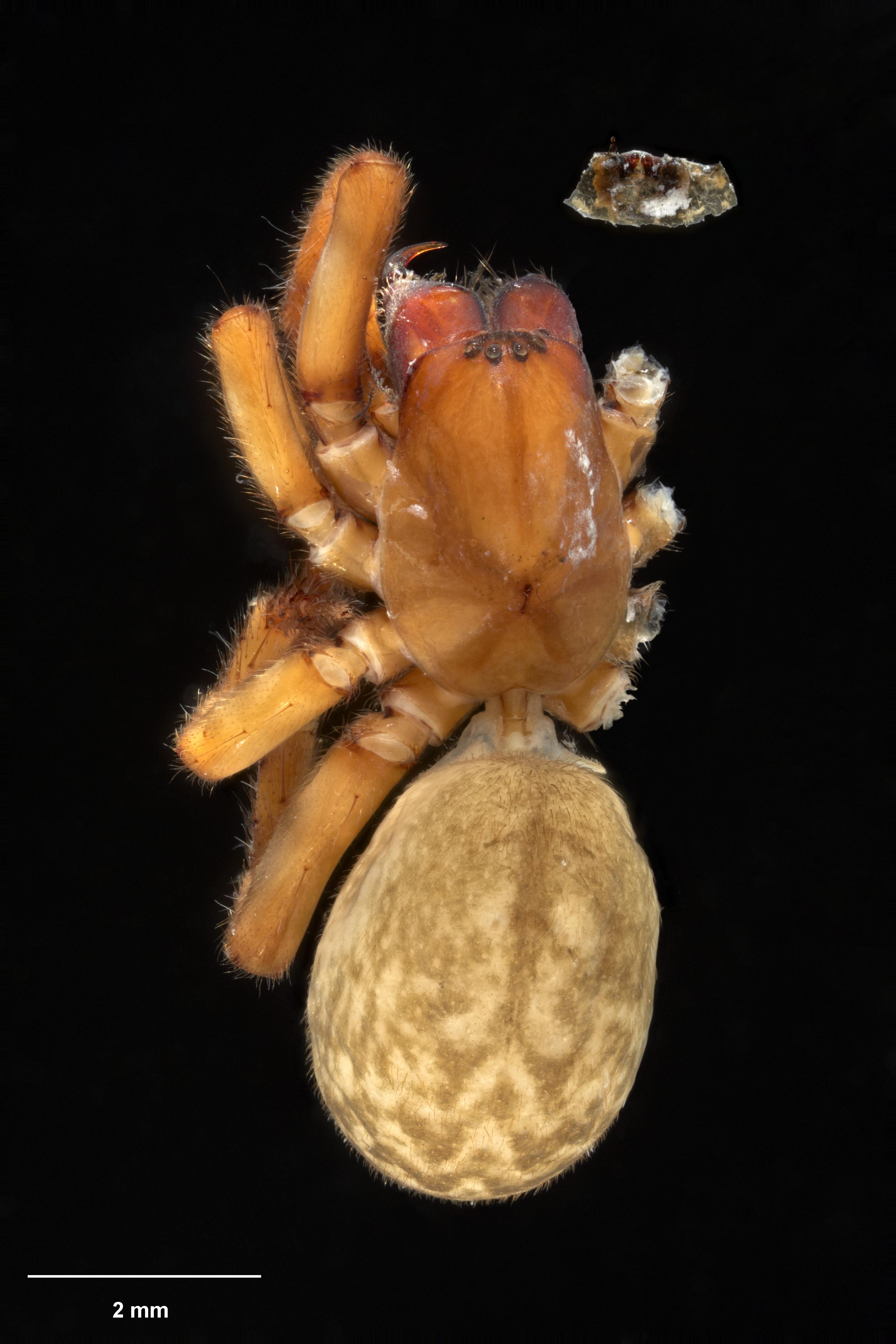

Conservation status
- Not Threatened (NZ TCS)

Scientific classification
- Kingdom: Animalia
- Phylum: Arthropoda
- Subphylum: Chelicerata
- Class: Arachnida
- Order: Araneae
- Infraorder: Araneomorphae
- Family: Cycloctenidae
- Genus: Pakeha
- Species: P. tecta

Binomial name
- Pakeha tecta Forster & Wilton, 1973

= Pakeha tecta =

Species of spider

Pakeha tecta is a species of Cycloctenidae spider that is endemic to New Zealand.

== Taxonomy ==
This species was described in 1973 by Ray Forster and Cecil Wilton from female specimens. The holotype is stored in Te Papa Museum under registration number AS.000118.

== Description ==
The female is recorded at 7.20mm in length. The carapace and legs are coloured orange brown. The abdomen is shaded blackish brown with pale markings dorsally. No descriptive details of the male were given in the original description except for figures of the male palp.

== Distribution ==
This species is only known from Southland and Stewart Island, New Zealand. It has been recorded from the coast to an altitude of 1000' (304 m).

== Conservation status ==
Under the New Zealand Threat Classification System, this species is listed as "Not Threatened".
