= Orepukia sorenseni =

Conservation status
- Not Threatened (NZ TCS)

Scientific classification
- Kingdom: Animalia
- Phylum: Arthropoda
- Subphylum: Chelicerata
- Class: Arachnida
- Order: Araneae
- Infraorder: Araneomorphae
- Family: Cycloctenidae
- Genus: Orepukia
- Species: O. sorenseni

Binomial name
- Orepukia sorenseni Forster & Wilton, 1973

Species of spider

Orepukia sorenseni is a species of Cycloctenidae that is endemic to New Zealand.

== Taxonomy ==
This species was described in 1973 by Ray Forster and Cecil Wilton from male and female specimens. The holotype is stored in Otago Museum.

== Description ==
The male is recorded at 6.71mm in length whereas the female is 6.40mm. The carapace and abdomen are patterned dorsally.

== Distribution ==
This species is only known from Southland and Stewart Island in New Zealand.

== Conservation status ==
Under the New Zealand Threat Classification System, this species is listed as "Not Threatened".
