= Toxopsiella centralis =

Conservation status
- Not Threatened (NZ TCS)

Scientific classification
- Kingdom: Animalia
- Phylum: Arthropoda
- Subphylum: Chelicerata
- Class: Arachnida
- Order: Araneae
- Infraorder: Araneomorphae
- Family: Cycloctenidae
- Genus: Toxopsiella
- Species: T. centralis

Binomial name
- Toxopsiella centralis Forster, 1964

Species of spider

Toxopsiella centralis is a species of Cycloctenidae spider endemic to New Zealand.

== Taxonomy ==
This species was described in 1964 by Ray Forster from female specimens. It was most recently revised in 1979, in which the male was described. The holotype is stored in Canterbury Museum.

== Description ==
The female is recorded at 7.56mm in length. This species has a dark brown carapace with pale markings dorsally. The abdomen is mottled with dark and brown patches.

== Distribution ==
This species is only known from the North Island of New Zealand.

== Conservation status ==
Under the New Zealand Threat Classification System, this species is listed as "Not Threatened".
