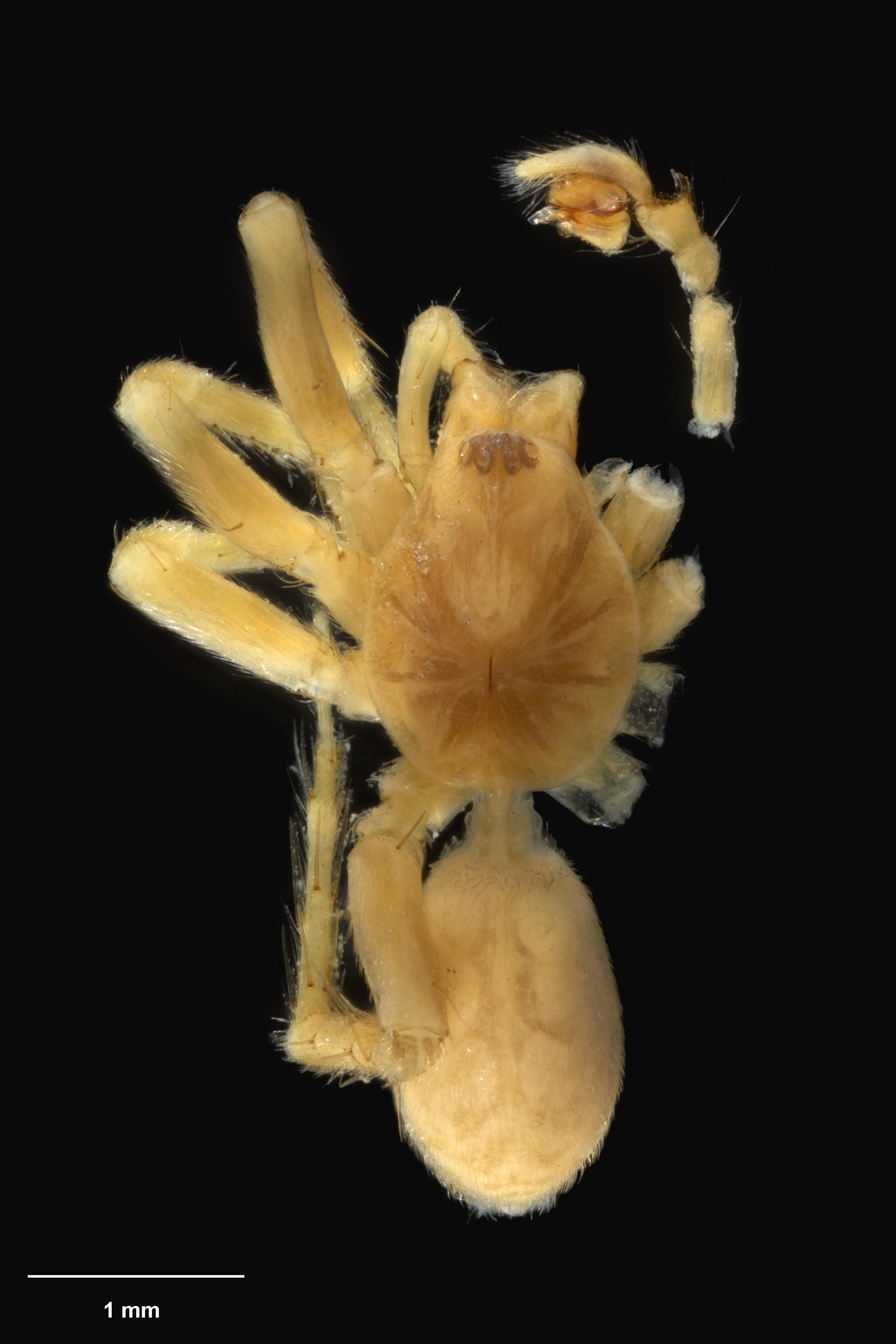

Conservation status
- Data Deficit (NZ TCS)

Scientific classification
- Kingdom: Animalia
- Phylum: Arthropoda
- Subphylum: Chelicerata
- Class: Arachnida
- Order: Araneae
- Infraorder: Araneomorphae
- Family: Cycloctenidae
- Genus: Pakeha
- Species: P. pula

Binomial name
- Pakeha pula Forster & Wilton, 1973

= Pakeha pula =

Species of spider

Pakeha pula is a species of Cycloctenidae spider that is endemic to New Zealand.

== Taxonomy ==
This species was described in 1973 by Ray Forster and Cecil Wilton from male and female specimens. The holotype is stored in Te Papa Museum under registration number AS.000090.

== Description ==
The male is recorded at 3.56mm in length whereas the female is 3.84mm. The carapace and legs are orange brown. The abdomen is cream with brown markings dorsally.

== Distribution ==
This species is only known from Nelson, New Zealand.

== Conservation status ==
Under the New Zealand Threat Classification System, this species is listed as "Data Deficient" with the qualifiers of "Data Poor: Size" and "Data Poor: Trend".
