= Plectophanes archeyi =

Conservation status
- Data Deficit (NZ TCS)

Scientific classification
- Kingdom: Animalia
- Phylum: Arthropoda
- Subphylum: Chelicerata
- Class: Arachnida
- Order: Araneae
- Infraorder: Araneomorphae
- Family: Cycloctenidae
- Genus: Plectophanes
- Species: P. archeyi

Binomial name
- Plectophanes archeyi Forster, 1964

Species of spider

Plectophanes archeyi is a species of Cycloctenidae spider endemic to New Zealand.

== Taxonomy ==
This species was described in 1964 by Ray Forster from female specimens. It was most recently revised in 1979. The holotype is stored in Canterbury Museum.

== Description ==
The female is recorded at 5.94mm. This species has a dark brown carapace. The abdomen is pale yellow with dark markings dorsally.

== Distribution ==
This species is only known from Canterbury, New Zealand.

== Conservation status ==
Under the New Zealand Threat Classification System, this species is listed as "Data Deficient" with the qualifiers of "Data Poor: Size" and "Data Poor: Trend".
