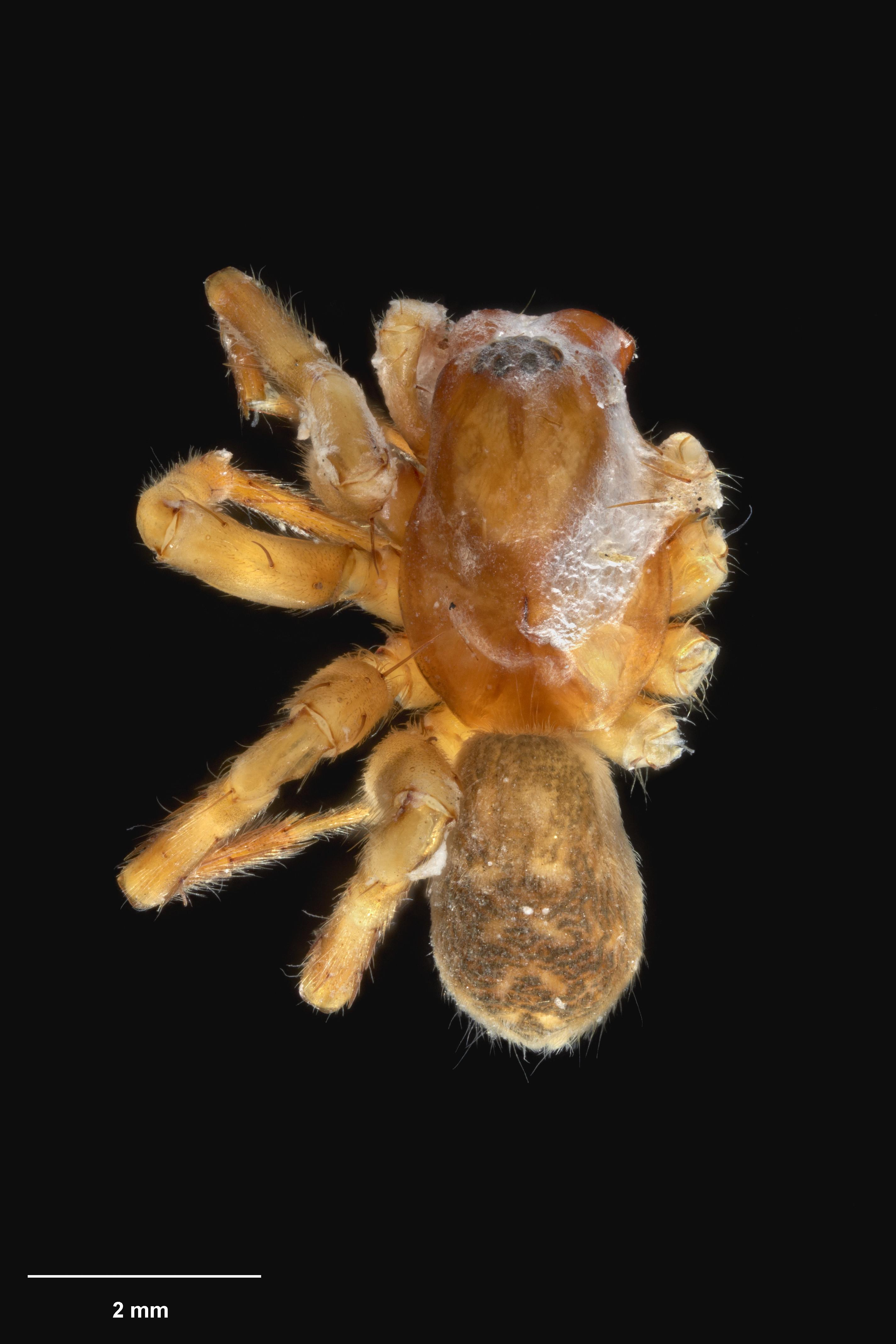

Conservation status
- Data Deficit (NZ TCS)

Scientific classification
- Kingdom: Animalia
- Phylum: Arthropoda
- Subphylum: Chelicerata
- Class: Arachnida
- Order: Araneae
- Infraorder: Araneomorphae
- Family: Cycloctenidae
- Genus: Orepukia
- Species: O. insula

Binomial name
- Orepukia insula Forster & Wilton, 1973

= Orepukia insula =

Species of spider

Orepukia insula is a species of Cycloctenidae that is endemic to New Zealand.

== Taxonomy ==
This species was described in 1973 by Ray Forster and Cecil Wilton from female specimens. The holotype is stored in Te Papa Museum under registration number AS.000054.

== Description ==
The female is recorded at 3.25mm in length. The carapace is an orange-brown color with dark-brown dorsall bands. The legs are yellow with dark bands. The abdomen is a dark shade with pale dorsall markings.

== Distribution ==
This species is only known from Solomon Island in the Stewart Island chain of New Zealand.

== Conservation status ==
Under the New Zealand Threat Classification System, this species is listed as "Data Deficient" with the qualifiers of "Data Poor: Size", "Data Poor: Trend" and "One Location".
