= Toxopsiella dugdalei =

Conservation status
- Not Threatened (NZ TCS)

Scientific classification
- Kingdom: Animalia
- Phylum: Arthropoda
- Subphylum: Chelicerata
- Class: Arachnida
- Order: Araneae
- Infraorder: Araneomorphae
- Family: Cycloctenidae
- Genus: Toxopsiella
- Species: T. dugdalei

Binomial name
- Toxopsiella dugdalei Forster, 1964

Species of spider

Toxopsiella dugdalei is a species of Cycloctenidae spider endemic to New Zealand.

== Taxonomy ==
This species was described in 1964 by Ray Forster from male and female specimens. It was most recently revised in 1979. The holotype is stored in Canterbury Museum.

== Description ==
The male is recorded at 5.67mm in length whereas the female is 5.58mm. This carapace is dark brown with a pale marking dorsally. The abdomen is mottled brown.

== Distribution ==
This species is only known from the South Island of New Zealand.

== Conservation status ==
Under the New Zealand Threat Classification System, this species is listed as "Not Threatened".
