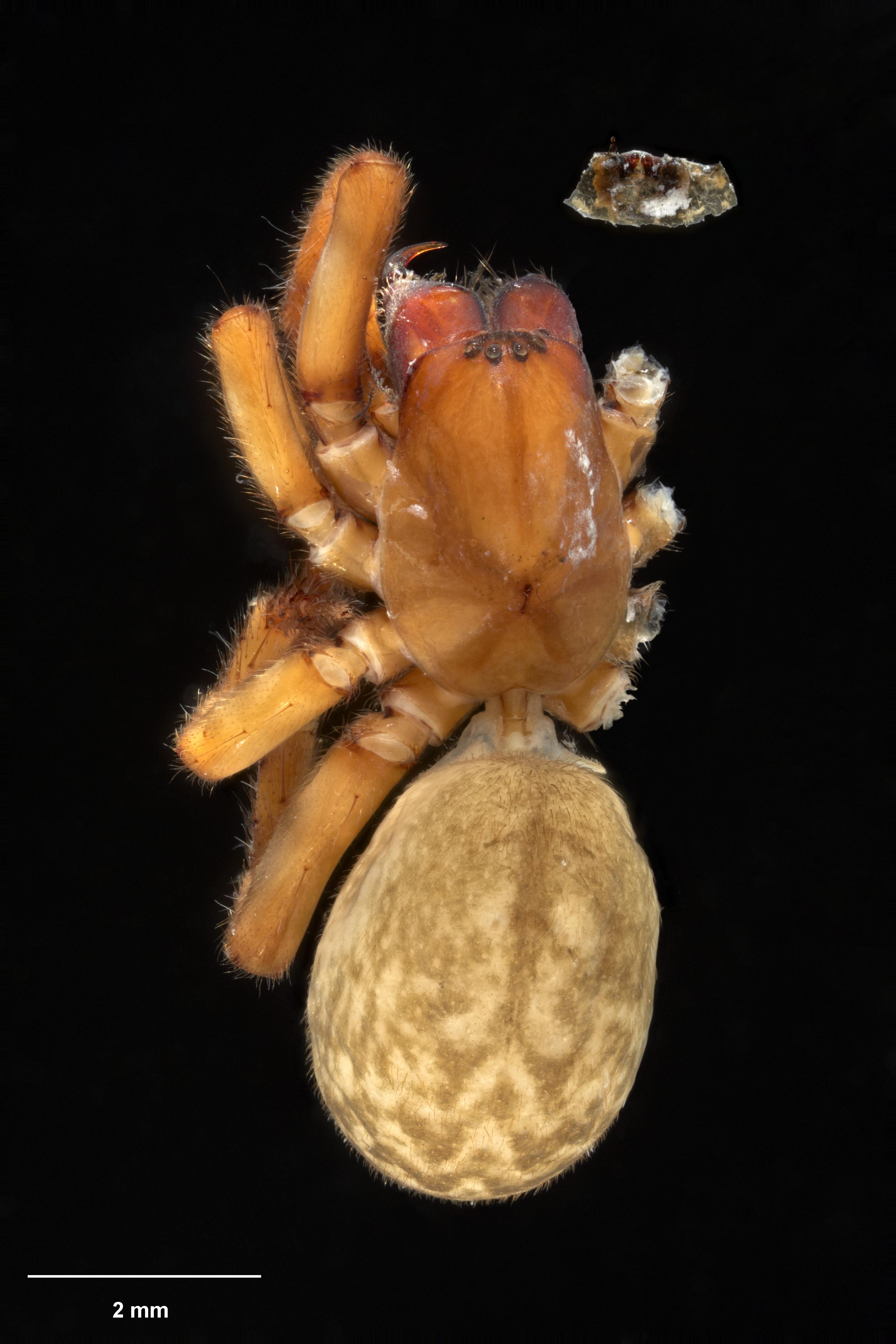
- Pakeha tecta

Scientific classification
- Kingdom: Animalia
- Phylum: Arthropoda
- Subphylum: Chelicerata
- Class: Arachnida
- Order: Araneae
- Infraorder: Araneomorphae
- Family: Cycloctenidae
- Genus: Pakeha; Forster & Wilton, 1973

Type species
- P. protecta Forster & Wilton, 1973

Species
- 18, see text

= Pakeha (spider) =

Genus of spiders

Pakeha is a genus of South Pacific araneomorph spiders in the family Cycloctenidae, first described by Raymond Robert Forster & C. L. Wilton in 1973. The genus is endemic to New Zealand.

== Taxonomy ==
This genus was initially placed in the family Amaurobiidae but was later transferred to Cycloctenidae.

== Species ==
As of April 2019 it contains eighteen species:

- Pakeha buechlerae Forster & Wilton, 1973 — New Zealand
- Pakeha duplex Forster & Wilton, 1973 — New Zealand
- Pakeha hiloa Forster & Wilton, 1973 — New Zealand
- Pakeha inornata Forster & Wilton, 1973 — New Zealand
- Pakeha insignita Forster & Wilton, 1973 — New Zealand
- Pakeha kirki (Hogg, 1909) — New Zealand (Snares Is.)
- Pakeha lobata Forster & Wilton, 1973 — New Zealand
- Pakeha manapouri Forster & Wilton, 1973 — New Zealand
- Pakeha maxima Forster & Wilton, 1973 — New Zealand
- Pakeha media Forster & Wilton, 1973 — New Zealand
- Pakeha minima Forster & Wilton, 1973 — New Zealand
- Pakeha paratecta Forster & Wilton, 1973 — New Zealand
- Pakeha parrotti Forster & Wilton, 1973 — New Zealand
- Pakeha protecta Forster & Wilton, 1973 — New Zealand
- Pakeha pula Forster & Wilton, 1973 — New Zealand
- Pakeha stewartia Forster & Wilton, 1973 — New Zealand
- Pakeha subtecta Forster & Wilton, 1973 — New Zealand
- Pakeha tecta Forster & Wilton, 1973 — New Zealand
