= Pakeha kirki =

Conservation status
- Naturally Uncommon (NZ TCS)

Scientific classification
- Domain: Eukaryota
- Kingdom: Animalia
- Phylum: Arthropoda
- Subphylum: Chelicerata
- Class: Arachnida
- Order: Araneae
- Infraorder: Araneomorphae
- Family: Cycloctenidae
- Genus: Pakeha
- Species: P. kirki

Binomial name
- Pakeha kirki (Hogg, 1909)

Synonyms
- Myro kirki

Species of spider

Pakeha kirki is a species of Cycloctenidae spider that is endemic to New Zealand.

== Taxonomy ==
This species was described as Myro kirki in 1909 by Henry Roughton Hogg from a female specimen. It was most recently revised in 1973, in which the male was described. The holotype is stored in Otago Museum.

== Description ==
The female and male are recorded at 16.32mm. The cephalothorax and legs are coloured pale reddish brown. The abdomen is pale grey with white markings dorsally.

== Distribution ==
This species is only known from Snares Island, New Zealand.

== Conservation status ==
Under the New Zealand Threat Classification System, this species is listed as "Naturally Uncommon" with the qualifiers of "Island Endemic" and "One Location".
