= Robert Pilgrim (entomologist) =

New Zealand entomologist (1921–2010)

- Born: 26 August 1921; Christchurch, New Zealand
- Died: 7 April 2010 (aged 88); Christchurch, New Zealand
- Education: University of Canterbury, London University College
- Spouse: Joy Davies (m. 1945)
- Children: 2
- Scientific career
- Fields: Entomology, Malacology
- Workplaces: University of Canterbury
- Thesis: (1951)

Robert Louis Cecil Pilgrim (26 August 1921 – 7 April 2010) was a New Zealand entomologist who is best known for his extensive research on fleas and bird lice.

== Early life and education ==
Pilgrim was born in Christchurch on 26 August 1921. He attended Christchurch Boys' Highschool but had to leave when he was 16 years old after his father's business collapsed during the Great Depression. While working as a public servant, he became a part-time student at Canterbury College and completed a Bachelor of Science in 1943.

After completing his bachelor's degree, Pilgrim served as a biochemist and diagnostician in the New Zealand Medical Corps during World War 2, during which he was stationed in New Caledonia. Pilgrim was released from his service to work as an essential research assistant.

Pilgrim then completed a Master of Science in zoology at Canterbury College in 1947, in which he wrote a thesis on freshwater mussels. After this, he went to England to undertake a PhD at London University College, which he completed in 1951.

== Career ==
Once Pilgrim returned to New Zealand after completing his PhD, he became a lecturer at Canterbury College and eventually became a senior lecturer in 1954. In 1957 he was given a fellowship that allowed him to conduct postdoctoral work in California, Washington, England and Italy. After this period he returned to New Zealand and continued to work at Canterbury College until his retirement in 1983.

Although Pilgrim is mainly known for his extensive research on fleas and bird lice, he researched many other topics such as neurophysiology, mussels and a wide range of New Zealand's invertebrates.

== Death ==
Pilgrim died on 7 April 2010 from a heart attack while at home.

== Eponymy ==
Pilgrim has numerous species of invertebrates named after him.

- Analges pilgrimi Mironov & Galloway, 2002
- Aorangia pilgrimi Forster & Wilton, 1973
- Ardeicola pilgrimi Tandan, 1972
- Colpocephalum pilgrimi Price, 1967
- Degeeriella mookerjeei pilgrimi Tendeiro, 1979
- Forficuloecus pilgrimi Guimarães, 1985
- Mecaderochondria pilgrimi Ho & Dojiri, 1987
- Neocyproidea pilgrimi Hurley, 1955
- Notiopsylla peregrinus Smit, 1979
- Nuncia (Micronuncia) roeweri pilgrimi Forster 1954
- Plectophanes pilgrimi Forster, 1964
- Pseudomenopon pilgrimi Price, 1974
- Rallicola pilgrimi Clay, 1972
- Scherocumella pilgrimi (Jones, 1963)
- Schistobrachia pilgrimi Kabata, 1988
- Spilomicrus pilgrimi Early, 1978
- Trizocheles pilgrimi Forest & McLaughlin, 2000

== Selected publications ==
- Pilgrim, R.L.C. (1954). Waste of carbon and of energy in nitrogen excretion. Nature 173: 491–492. https://doi.org/10.1038/173491a0
- Pilgrim, R.L.C. (1970). Knowledge of New Zealand Mecoptera, Mallophaga, Anoplura and Siphonaptera. New Zealand Entomologist 4(3): 72–79. https://doi.org/10.1080/00779962.1970.9722925
- Pilgrim, R.L.C. (1980). The New Zealand flea fauna. Pp. 173– 184. In: Traub, R. and Starcke, H. (eds). Fleas. Proceedings of the International Conference on Fleas, Ashton Wold, Peterborough, UK, 21–25 June 1977. Rotterdam: A.A. Balkema. x + 420 pp.
- Horning, D.S., Palma, R.L. and Pilgrim, R.L.C. (1980). The lice (Insecta: Phthiraptera) from the Snares Islands, New Zealand. National Museum of New Zealand Miscellaneous Series 3. 17 pp
- Pilgrim, R.L.C. (1992). An historic collection of fleas (Siphonaptera) in the Macleay Museum, Sydney, Australia. Proceedings of the Linnean Society of New South Wales 113(1): 77–86.
- Pilgrim, R.L.C. (1992). Preparation and examination of flea larvae (Siphonaptera) by light and electron microscopy. Journal of Medical Entomology 29(6): 953–959. https://doi.org/10.1093/jmedent/29.6.953
- Pilgrim, R.L.C. (1998). Larvae of the genus Notiopsylla (Siphonaptera: Pygiopsyllidae) with a key to their identification. Journal of Medical Entomology 35(4): 362–376. https://doi.org/10.1093/jmedent/35.4.362
- Pilgrim, R.L.C. and Galloway, T.D. (2007). Descriptions of flea larvae (Siphonaptera: Hystrichopsyllidae, Ctenophthalmi - dae, Leptopsyllidae) of the specific parasites of the mountain beaver (Rodentia: Aplodontidae) in North America. Canadian Entomologist 139: 489–509. https://doi.org/10.4039/n06-072
