= Toxopsiella australis =

Conservation status
- Not Threatened (NZ TCS)

Scientific classification
- Kingdom: Animalia
- Phylum: Arthropoda
- Subphylum: Chelicerata
- Class: Arachnida
- Order: Araneae
- Infraorder: Araneomorphae
- Family: Cycloctenidae
- Genus: Toxopsiella
- Species: T. australis

Binomial name
- Toxopsiella australis Forster, 1964

Species of spider

Toxopsiella australis is a species of Cycloctenidae spider endemic to New Zealand.

== Taxonomy ==
This species was described in 1964 by Ray Forster from female specimens. It was most recently revised in 1979, in which the male was described. The holotype is stored in Otago Museum.

== Description ==
The male is recorded at 5.74mm in length whereas the female is 6.66mm. The abdomen is shaded with black and has pale patches.

== Distribution ==
This species is only known from Fiordland, New Zealand.

== Conservation status ==
Under the New Zealand Threat Classification System, this species is listed as "Not Threatened".
