= Orepukia riparia =

Conservation status
- Data Deficit (NZ TCS)

Scientific classification
- Kingdom: Animalia
- Phylum: Arthropoda
- Subphylum: Chelicerata
- Class: Arachnida
- Order: Araneae
- Infraorder: Araneomorphae
- Family: Cycloctenidae
- Genus: Orepukia
- Species: O. riparia

Binomial name
- Orepukia riparia Forster & Wilton, 1973

Species of spider

Orepukia riparia is a species of Cycloctenidae that is endemic to New Zealand.

== Taxonomy ==
This species was described in 1973 by Ray Forster and Cecil Wilton from male and female specimens. The holotype is stored in Otago Museum.

== Description ==
The female is recorded at 8.2mm in length whereas the male is 5.8mm. The carapace is patterned dorsally. The legs have dark bands. The abdomen is shaded black with pale markings dorsally.

== Distribution ==
This species is only known from Southland, New Zealand.

== Conservation status ==
Under the New Zealand Threat Classification System, this species is listed as "Data Deficient" with the qualifiers of "Data Poor: Size", "Data Poor: Trend" and "One Location".
