= Orepukia nummosa =

Conservation status
- Naturally Uncommon (NZ TCS)

Scientific classification
- Domain: Eukaryota
- Kingdom: Animalia
- Phylum: Arthropoda
- Subphylum: Chelicerata
- Class: Arachnida
- Order: Araneae
- Infraorder: Araneomorphae
- Family: Cycloctenidae
- Genus: Orepukia
- Species: O. nummosa

Binomial name
- Orepukia nummosa (Hogg, 1909)

Synonyms
- Rubrius nummosus; Cheiracanthium nummosum

Species of spider

Orepukia nummosa is a species of Cycloctenidae that is endemic to New Zealand.

== Taxonomy ==
This species was described as Rubrius nummosus in 1909 by Henry Roughton Hogg from a female specimen. It was most recently revised in 1973. The holotype is stored in Otago Museum.

== Description ==
The female is recorded at 18.5mm in length. The cephalothorax is coloured red brown. The abdomen is yellow brown and has dark grey markings.

== Distribution ==
This species is only known from Bounty Island and Antipodes Island in New Zealand.

== Conservation status ==
Under the New Zealand Threat Classification System, this species is listed as "Naturally Uncommon" with the qualifiers of "Island Endemic" and "One Location".
