= Uzakia =

Conservation status
- Data Deficit (NZ TCS)

Scientific classification
- Kingdom: Animalia
- Phylum: Arthropoda
- Subphylum: Chelicerata
- Class: Arachnida
- Order: Araneae
- Infraorder: Araneomorphae
- Family: Cycloctenidae
- Genus: Uzakia; Koçak & Kemal, 2008
- Species: U. unica

Binomial name
- Uzakia unica (Forster, 1970)

Synonyms
- Anaua unica

Genus of spiders

Uzakia is a monotypic genus of South Pacific araneomorph spiders in the family Cycloctenidae containing the single species, Uzakia unica. and has only been found in New Zealand.

== Taxonomy ==
This species was first described as Anaua unica by Ray Forster in 1970 from female specimens. The genus name Uzakia is a replacement name for Anaua, which had already been used in the Orthoptera. The holotype is stored in Otago Museum.

== Description ==
The female is recorded at 5.4mm in length. The male palp was illustrated in a later publication, but no other character details were recorded.

== Distribution ==
This species is only known from Fiordland, New Zealand.

== Conservation status ==
Under the New Zealand Threat Classification System, this species is listed as "Data Deficient" with the qualifiers of "Data Poor: Size" and "Data Poor: Trend".
