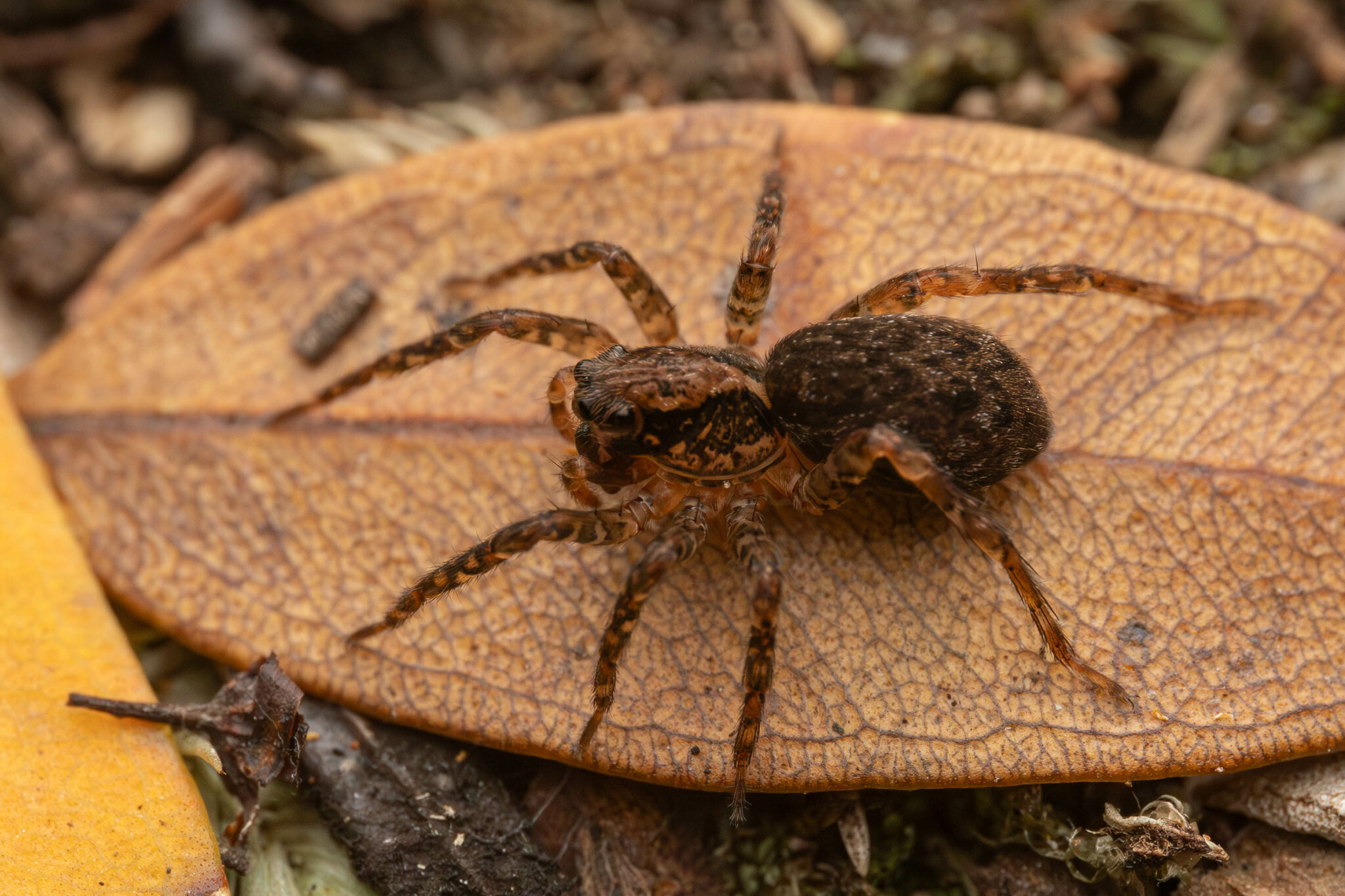
- Toxopsiella spp. seen near Te Miko, Punakaiki, West Coast

Scientific classification
- Domain: Eukaryota
- Kingdom: Animalia
- Phylum: Arthropoda
- Subphylum: Chelicerata
- Class: Arachnida
- Order: Araneae
- Infraorder: Araneomorphae
- Family: Cycloctenidae
- Genus: Toxopsiella; Forster, 1964

Type species
- T. lawrencei Forster, 1964

Species
- 12, see text

= Toxopsiella =

Genus of spiders

Toxopsiella is a genus of South Pacific araneomorph spiders in the family Cycloctenidae, and was first described by Raymond Robert Forster in 1964.

== Species ==
As of May 2019 it contains twelve species, all found in New Zealand:

- Toxopsiella alpina Forster, 1964 – New Zealand
- Toxopsiella australis Forster, 1964 – New Zealand
- Toxopsiella centralis Forster, 1964 – New Zealand
- Toxopsiella dugdalei Forster, 1964 – New Zealand
- Toxopsiella horningi Forster, 1979 – New Zealand
- Toxopsiella lawrencei Forster, 1964 (type) – New Zealand
- Toxopsiella medialis Forster, 1964 – New Zealand
- Toxopsiella minuta Forster, 1964 – New Zealand
- Toxopsiella nelsonensis Forster, 1979 – New Zealand
- Toxopsiella orientalis Forster, 1964 – New Zealand
- Toxopsiella parrotti Forster, 1964 – New Zealand
- Toxopsiella perplexa Forster, 1964 – New Zealand
