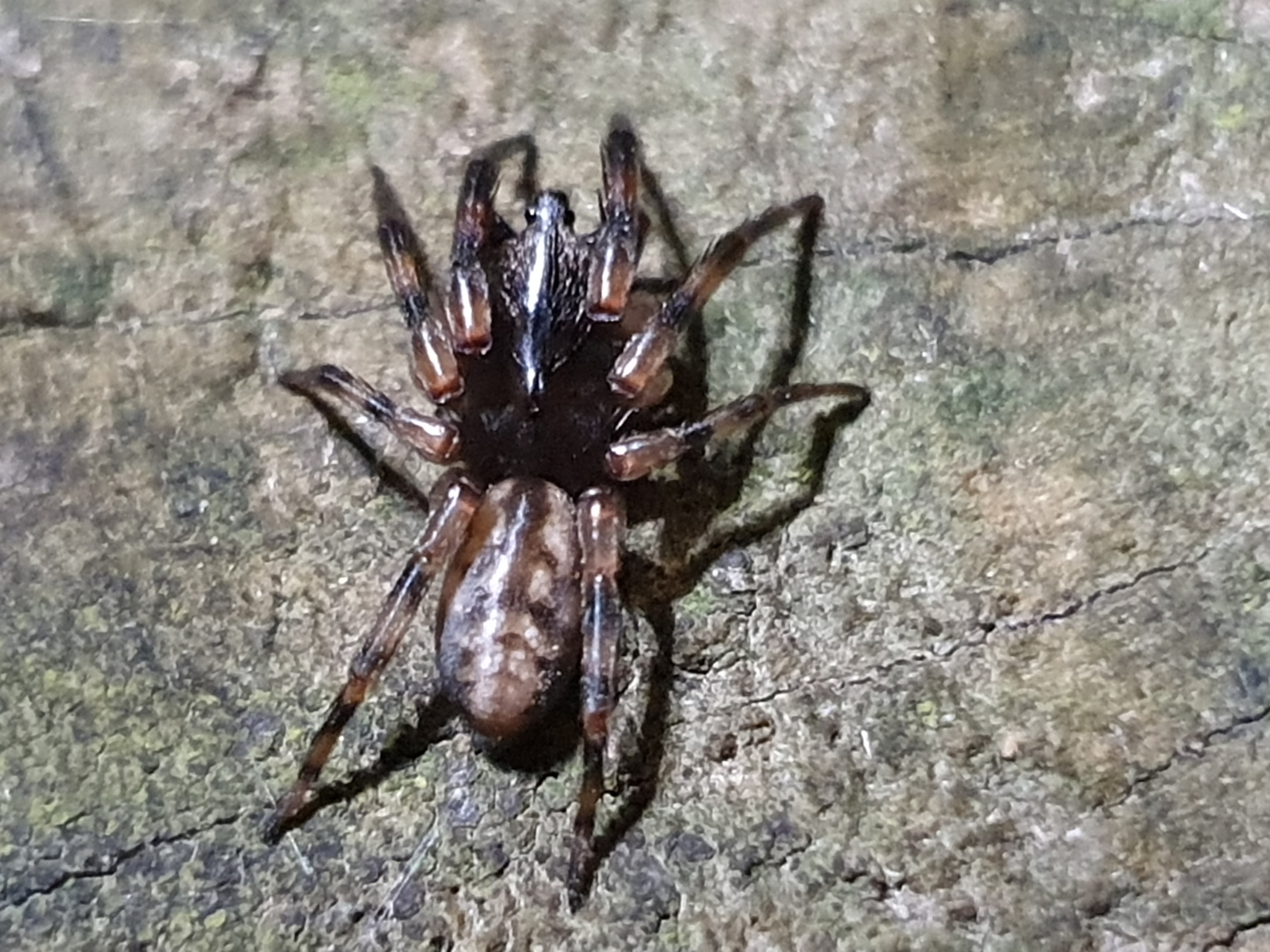
- Plectophanes sp.

Scientific classification
- Kingdom: Animalia
- Phylum: Arthropoda
- Subphylum: Chelicerata
- Class: Arachnida
- Order: Araneae
- Infraorder: Araneomorphae
- Family: Cycloctenidae
- Genus: Plectophanes; Bryant, 1935

Type species
- P. frontalis Bryant, 1935

Species
- 5, see text

= Plectophanes =

Genus of spiders

Plectophanes is a genus of South Pacific araneomorph spiders in the family Cycloctenidae, and was first described by Elizabeth B. Bryant in 1935. The eyes are positioned on an extension of the carapace that projects forward of the chelicerae.

== Description ==
These spiders are distinguished from other cycloctenids by the positioning of the eyes on an extension of the carapace that projects forward of the chelicerae.

== Species ==
As of May 2019 it contains five species, all found in New Zealand:

- Plectophanes altus Forster, 1964 – New Zealand
- Plectophanes archeyi Forster, 1964 – New Zealand
- Plectophanes frontalis Bryant, 1935 (type) – New Zealand
- Plectophanes hollowayae Forster, 1964 – New Zealand
- Plectophanes pilgrimi Forster, 1964 – New Zealand

== Biology ==
Members of this genus are noted for living in holes in trees and branches. Their unusual eye arrangement allows them to observe approaching prey while the rest of the body remains concealed.
