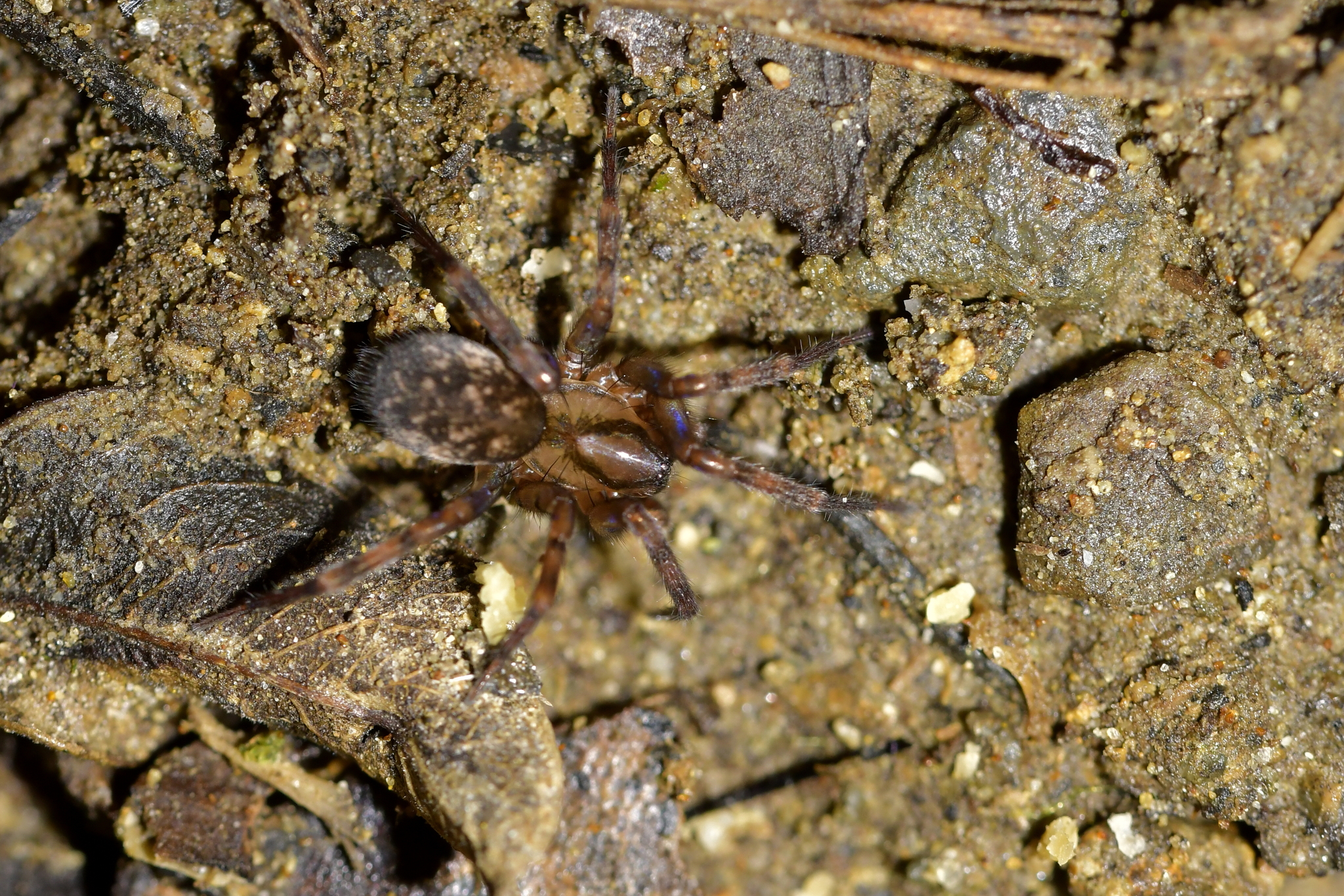
- Orepukia poppelwelli

Scientific classification
- Kingdom: Animalia
- Phylum: Arthropoda
- Subphylum: Chelicerata
- Class: Arachnida
- Order: Araneae
- Infraorder: Araneomorphae
- Family: Cycloctenidae
- Genus: Orepukia; Forster & Wilton, 1973

Type species
- O. sorenseni Forster & Wilton, 1973

Species
- 24, see text

= Orepukia =

Genus of spiders

Orepukia is a genus of South Pacific araneomorph spiders in the family Cycloctenidae, known only from New Zealand. First described by Raymond Robert Forster & C. L. Wilton in 1973, it was originally placed in Agelenidae, but was transferred to Cycloctenidae in 2017. Their webs are built on the ground between fallen branches, logs, and other debris, and they are commonly found on the South Island, but hardly ever anywhere else. They range in size from 6 to 7.5 millimetres (0.24 to 0.30 in) and lack a cribellum. Their eight eyes are in two rows, the anterior row straight and the other slightly curved. Their jaws are vertical and the labium is notched near the base.

== Species ==
As of April 2019 it contains twenty-four species:

- Orepukia alta Forster & Wilton, 1973 — New Zealand
- Orepukia catlinensis Forster & Wilton, 1973 — New Zealand
- Orepukia dugdalei Forster & Wilton, 1973 — New Zealand
- Orepukia egmontensis Forster & Wilton, 1973 — New Zealand
- Orepukia florae Forster & Wilton, 1973 — New Zealand
- Orepukia geophila Forster & Wilton, 1973 — New Zealand
- Orepukia grisea Forster & Wilton, 1973 — New Zealand
- Orepukia insula Forster & Wilton, 1973 — New Zealand
- Orepukia nota Forster & Wilton, 1973 — New Zealand
- Orepukia nummosa (Hogg, 1909) — New Zealand
- Orepukia orophila Forster & Wilton, 1973 — New Zealand
- Orepukia pallida Forster & Wilton, 1973 — New Zealand
- Orepukia poppelwelli Forster & Wilton, 1973 — New Zealand
- Orepukia prina Forster & Wilton, 1973 — New Zealand
- Orepukia rakiura Forster & Wilton, 1973 — New Zealand
- Orepukia redacta Forster & Wilton, 1973 — New Zealand
- Orepukia riparia Forster & Wilton, 1973 — New Zealand
- Orepukia sabua Forster & Wilton, 1973 — New Zealand
- Orepukia similis Forster & Wilton, 1973 — New Zealand
- Orepukia simplex Forster & Wilton, 1973 — New Zealand
- Orepukia sorenseni Forster & Wilton, 1973 — New Zealand
- Orepukia tanea Forster & Wilton, 1973 — New Zealand
- Orepukia tonga Forster & Wilton, 1973 — New Zealand
- Orepukia virtuta Forster & Wilton, 1973 — New Zealand
