= Galliena =

Scientific classification
- Kingdom: Animalia
- Phylum: Arthropoda
- Subphylum: Chelicerata
- Class: Arachnida
- Order: Araneae
- Infraorder: Araneomorphae
- Family: Cycloctenidae
- Genus: Galliena; Simon, 1898
- Species: G. montigena

Binomial name
- Galliena montigena Simon, 1898

Genus of spider

Galliena is a monotypic genus of Southeast Asian araneomorph spiders which are located in the family Cycloctenidae containing the single species, Galliena montigena. It was first described by Eugène Simon in 1898, and has only been found in Indonesia.
