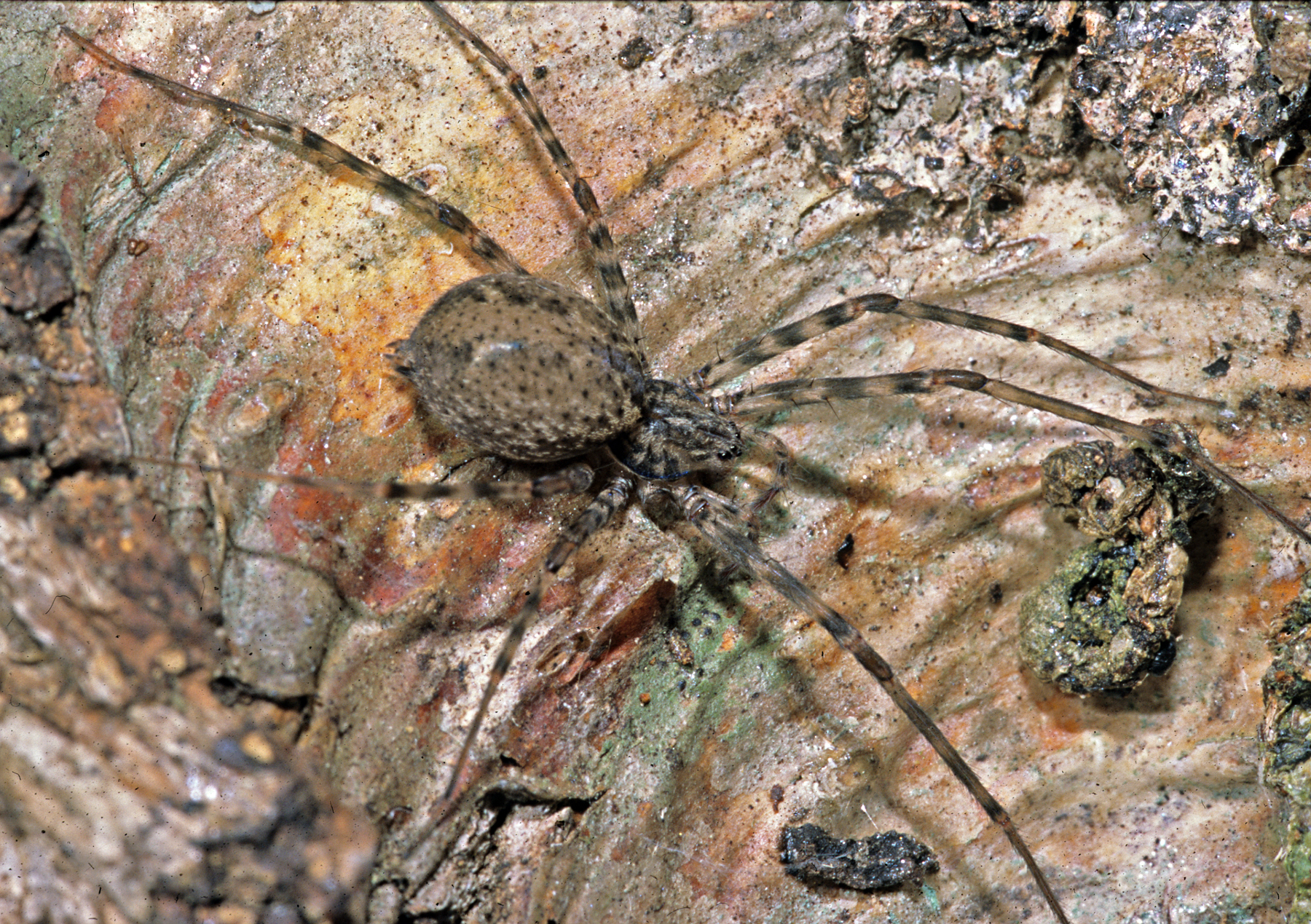
- Cycloctenus sp. from New Zealand
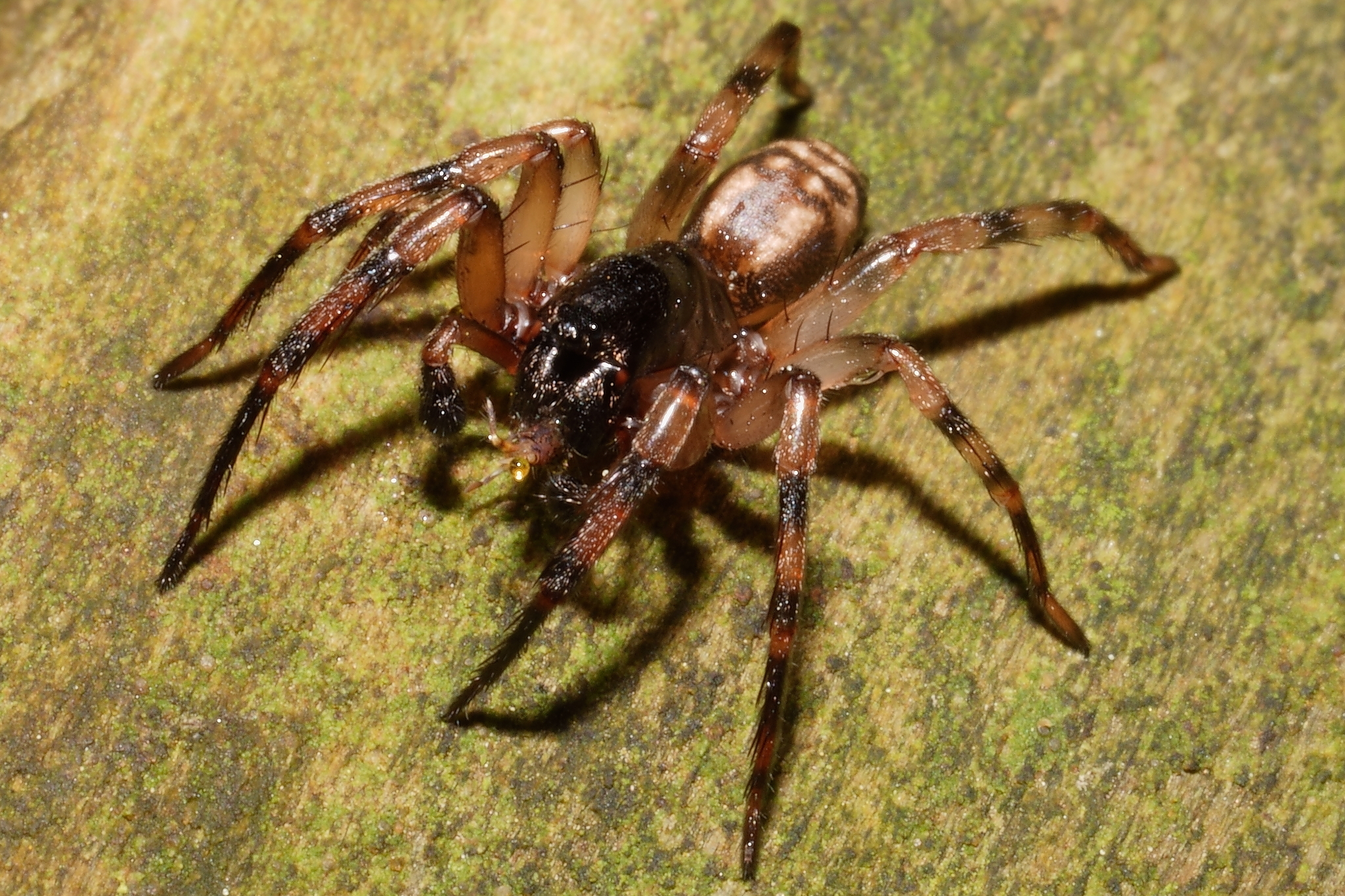
- male Plectophanes sp.

Scientific classification
- Kingdom: Animalia
- Phylum: Arthropoda
- Subphylum: Chelicerata
- Class: Arachnida
- Order: Araneae
- Infraorder: Araneomorphae
- Family: Cycloctenidae; Simon, 1898

Diversity
- 9 genera, 81 species
- blue: reported countries (WSC) green: observation hotspots (iNaturalist)

= Cycloctenidae =

Family of spiders

Cycloctenidae is a family of spiders first described by Eugène Simon in 1898.

== Distribution ==
Most genera are endemic to New Zealand, with one genus also found in Australia, and another endemic to Indonesia.

== Genera ==
As of January 2026, this family includes nine genera and 81 species:

- Cycloctenus L. Koch, 1878 – Australia, New Zealand
- Galliena Simon, 1898 – Indonesia
- Orepukia Forster & Wilton, 1973 – New Zealand
- Pacificana Hogg, 1904 – New Zealand
- Pakeha Forster & Wilton, 1973 – New Zealand
- Paravoca Forster & Wilton, 1973 – New Zealand
- Plectophanes Bryant, 1935 – New Zealand
- Toxopsiella Forster, 1964 – New Zealand
- Uzakia Koçak & Kemal, 2008 – New Zealand
