= C. lepidus =

C. lepidus may refer to:

- Calomys lepidus, a mouse species
- Cercartetus lepidus, a possum species
- Ceyx lepidus, a kingfisher species
- Chalcoscirtus lepidus, a jumping spider species in the genus Chalcoscirtus
- Crotalus lepidus, a pitviper species
- Cuculus lepidus, a cuckoo species
- Cycloctenus lepidus, a spider species in the genus Cycloctenus endemic to New Zealand

== See also ==
- Lepidus (disambiguation)
