= List of Linyphiidae species =

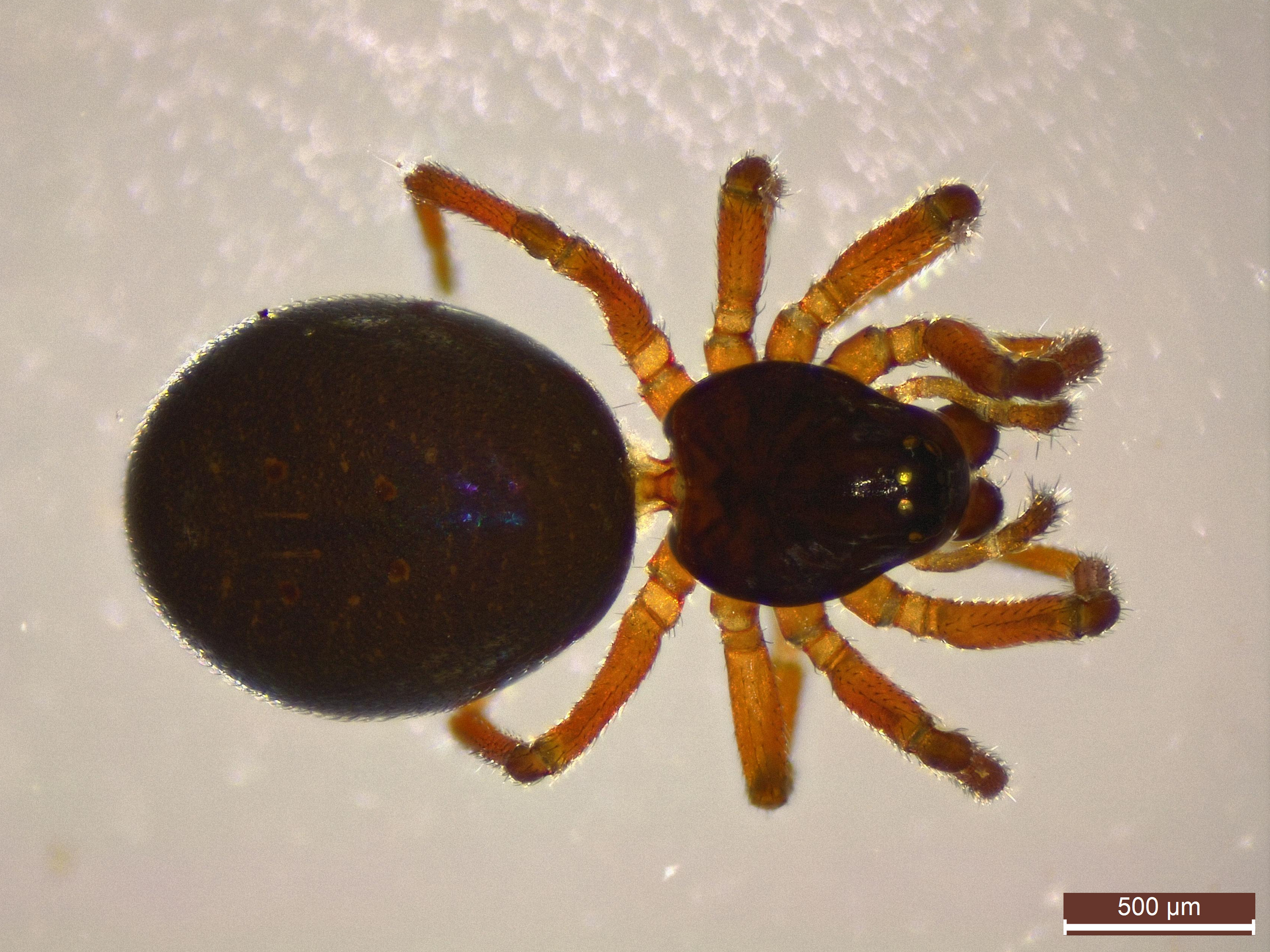
Silometopus reussi

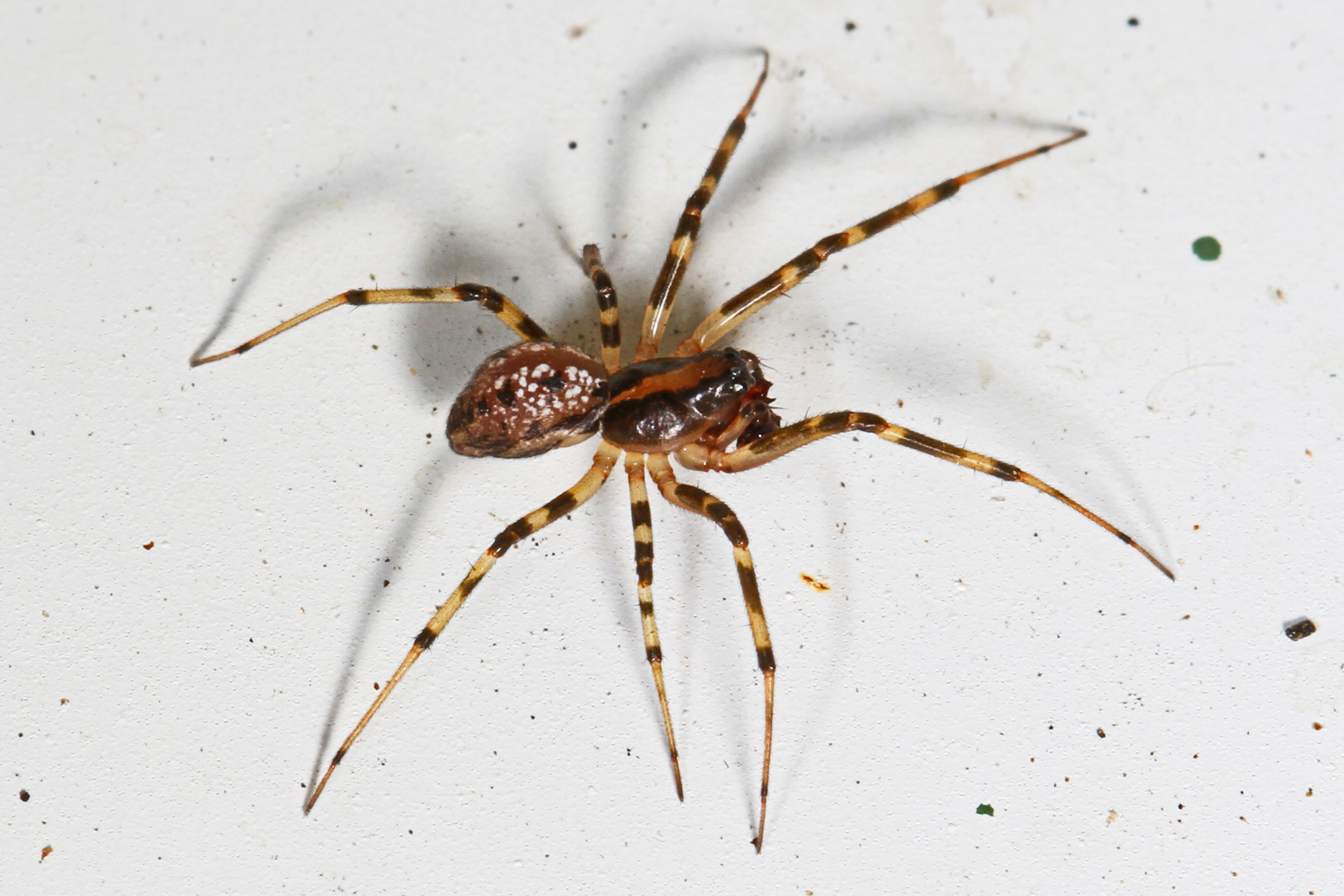
Tapinopa bilineata

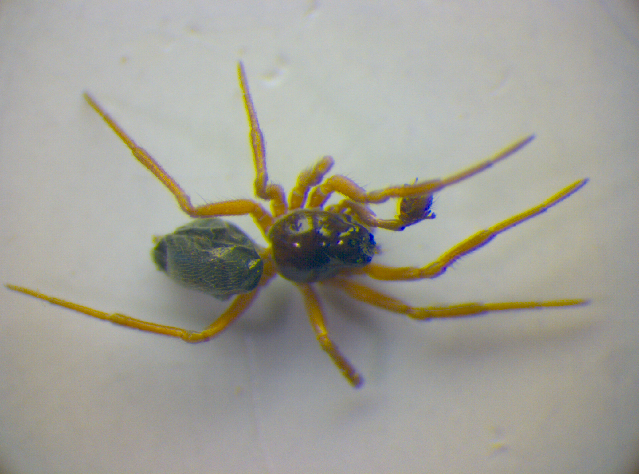
Araeoncus humilis

Lists of Linyphiidae species cover species of the spider family Linyphiidae. The overall list is divided into alphabetical sub-lists.

== Lists ==
- List of Linyphiidae species (A–H)
- List of Linyphiidae species (I–P)
- List of Linyphiidae species (Q–Z)
