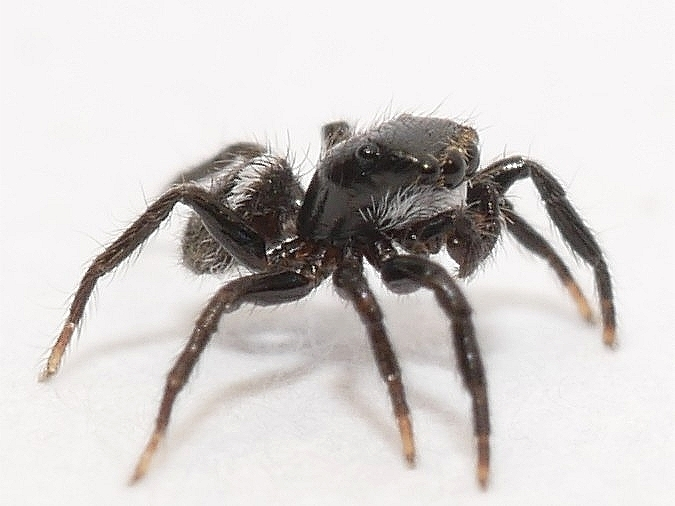
- The related species Chalcoscirtus diminutus

Scientific classification
- Kingdom: Animalia
- Phylum: Arthropoda
- Subphylum: Chelicerata
- Class: Arachnida
- Order: Araneae
- Infraorder: Araneomorphae
- Family: Salticidae
- Genus: Chalcoscirtus
- Species: C. picinus

Binomial name
- Chalcoscirtus picinus Wesołowska & van Harten, 2011

= Chalcoscirtus picinus =

Species of spider

Chalcoscirtus picinus is a species of jumping spider in the genus Chalcoscirtus that has been only found in the United Arab Emirates. The spider was first described in 2011 by Wanda Wesołowska and Antonius van Harten. It is a small spider, with a cephalothorax typically 1.4 mm (0.06 in) long and an abdomen typically 2 mm (0.08 in) long. It is hard to tell externally from other spiders as it is similar in size to others in the genus and, like many others, lacks a distinctive pattern on its body. Its carapace is generally greyish-brown with a black eye field while its abdomen is blackish-grey. The spider's copulatory organs. are its most distinguishing feature. The female has a small window made of membrane in the middle of its epigyne, which is narrower than that found in other species in the genus. The male has not been described.

== Taxonomy ==
Chalcoscirtus picinus is a jumping spider that was first described by Wanda Wesołowska and Antonius van Harten in 2011. It is one of over 500 species identified by the Polish arachnologist during her career. She allocated the species to the genus Chalcoscirtus. The genus was first circumscribed by Philipp Bertkau in 1880. The genus name derives from two Greek words, meaning bronze falcon. The species is named for a Latin word that can be translated "black" and refers to the colour of the spider's body.

In Wayne Maddison's 2015 study of spider phylogenetic classification, the genus Chalcoscirtus was placed in the tribe Euophryini. The tribe was part of the clade Simonida within the subfamily Saltafresia. The clade was named in honour of the arachnologist Eugène Simon. Two years later, in 2017, Jerzy Prószyński grouped the genus with nine other genera of jumping spiders under the name Euophryines, which was named after the genus Euophrys. He used the shape of the embolus and spermathecae as distinguishing signs for the group. Euophryines is itself placed within a supergroup named Euophryoida.

== Description ==
Chalcoscirtus picinus is a small spider that is typical for the genus, both in size and in the lack of patterns on its body. It has a body that consists of a cephalothorax and an abdomen that is typical in shape and colouration for the genus. The female has a cephalothorax that is typically 1.4 mm (0.06 in) long and 1 mm (0.04 in) wide. The carapace, the hard top of the cephalothorax, is a greyish-brown flattened oval. The eye field is black with a blue metallic lustre and long brown bristles near the eyes themselves. The spider's face, or clypeus, is very low. The spider's mouthparts, including the chelicerae, labium and maxilae, are brownish-black. The chelicerae are low with a few long bristles visible on the outside. There are two teeth at the front and none at the back. The abdomen is a slightly swollen oval that is blackish-grey and covered in fine brown hairs. It is typically 2 mm (0.08 in) long and 1.5 mm (0.06 in) wide. The spider's spinnerets are dark its legs are whitish-yellow with brown hairs and dark brown spines.

The spider has distinctive copulatory organs that help identify the species. The female has a small epigyne with a very small oval membrane forming a window in the centre. It is this window that helps distinguish the spider from others in the genus, mainly as is smaller and narrower than in other species. The copulatory openings lead to very short insemination ducts, initially marked with very small levels of sclerotisation. The receptacles, or spermathecae, are bean-shaped. The spider has large accessory glands. The male has not been described.

== Distribution ==
Chalcoscirtus species are found across Europe and Asia, and even as far as North America. They seem to particularly thrive in montane ecosystems, especially those with Alpine or Mediterranean climates. Some live on the Arabian Peninsula, including Chalcoscirtus picinus, which is endemic to the United Arab Emirates. The female holotype was found in Wadi Bih in 2010.
