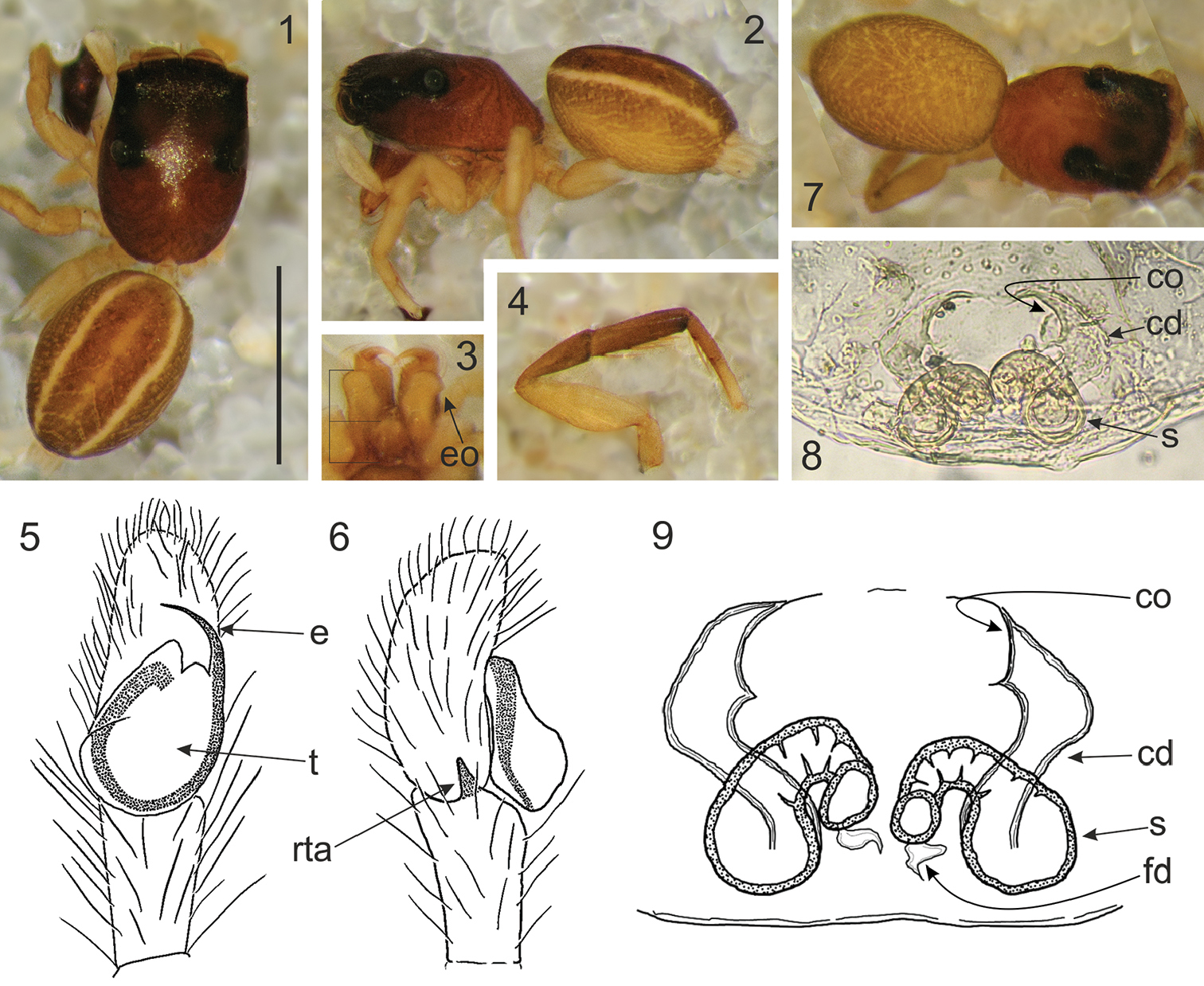

Scientific classification
- Kingdom: Animalia
- Phylum: Arthropoda
- Subphylum: Chelicerata
- Class: Arachnida
- Order: Araneae
- Infraorder: Araneomorphae
- Family: Salticidae
- Genus: Rogmocrypta
- Species: R. elegans

Binomial name
- Rogmocrypta elegans (Simon, 1885)

Synonyms
- Chalcoscirtus elegans Simon, 1885

= Rogmocrypta elegans =

Species of spider

Rogmocrypta elegans is a species of spiders in the jumping spider family, Salticidae. It is the type species of its genus (first described by Simon in 1885 as Chalcoscirtus elegans). It is found in New Caledonia and the Philippines.
