= Pseudotapinopa =

Scientific classification
- Kingdom: Animalia
- Phylum: Arthropoda
- Subphylum: Chelicerata
- Class: Arachnida
- Order: Araneae
- Infraorder: Araneomorphae
- Family: Linyphiidae
- Genus: Pseudotapinopa; Wunderlich, 2024
- Species: P. cotopaxi

Binomial name
- Pseudotapinopa cotopaxi Wunderlich, 2024

Species of spider

Pseudotapinopa is a monotypic genus of spiders in the family Linyphiidae containing the single species, Pseudotapinopa cotopaxi.

== Distribution ==
Pseudotapinopa cotopaxi has only been recorded from Ecuador.

== Description ==
The species is only known from two males that were beaten from a bush in 1979. It is yellowish, with a body length of 3.5-4.0 mm.

== Etymology ==
The genus is named for its apparent relationship to genus Tapinopa Westring, 1851, with the prefix "pseudo-" "false". The species name is derived from the place of collection of the holotype near the base of volcano Cotopaxi in Ecuador.
