= Cycloctenus agilis =

Conservation status
- Not Threatened (NZ TCS)

Scientific classification
- Kingdom: Animalia
- Phylum: Arthropoda
- Subphylum: Chelicerata
- Class: Arachnida
- Order: Araneae
- Infraorder: Araneomorphae
- Family: Cycloctenidae
- Genus: Cycloctenus
- Species: C. agilis

Binomial name
- Cycloctenus agilis Forster, 1979

Species of spider

Cycloctenus agilis is a species of Cycloctenidae spider endemic to New Zealand.

== Taxonomy ==
This species was described in 1979 by Ray Forster from female specimens. The holotype is stored in Otago Museum.

== Description ==
The female is recorded at 13 mm (0.51 in) in length. This species is very similar to Cycloctenus lepidus, but can be distinguished by minor differences in the genitalia.

== Distribution ==
This species is only known from Canterbury, New Zealand.

== Conservation status ==
Under the New Zealand Threat Classification System, this species is listed as "Not Threatened".
