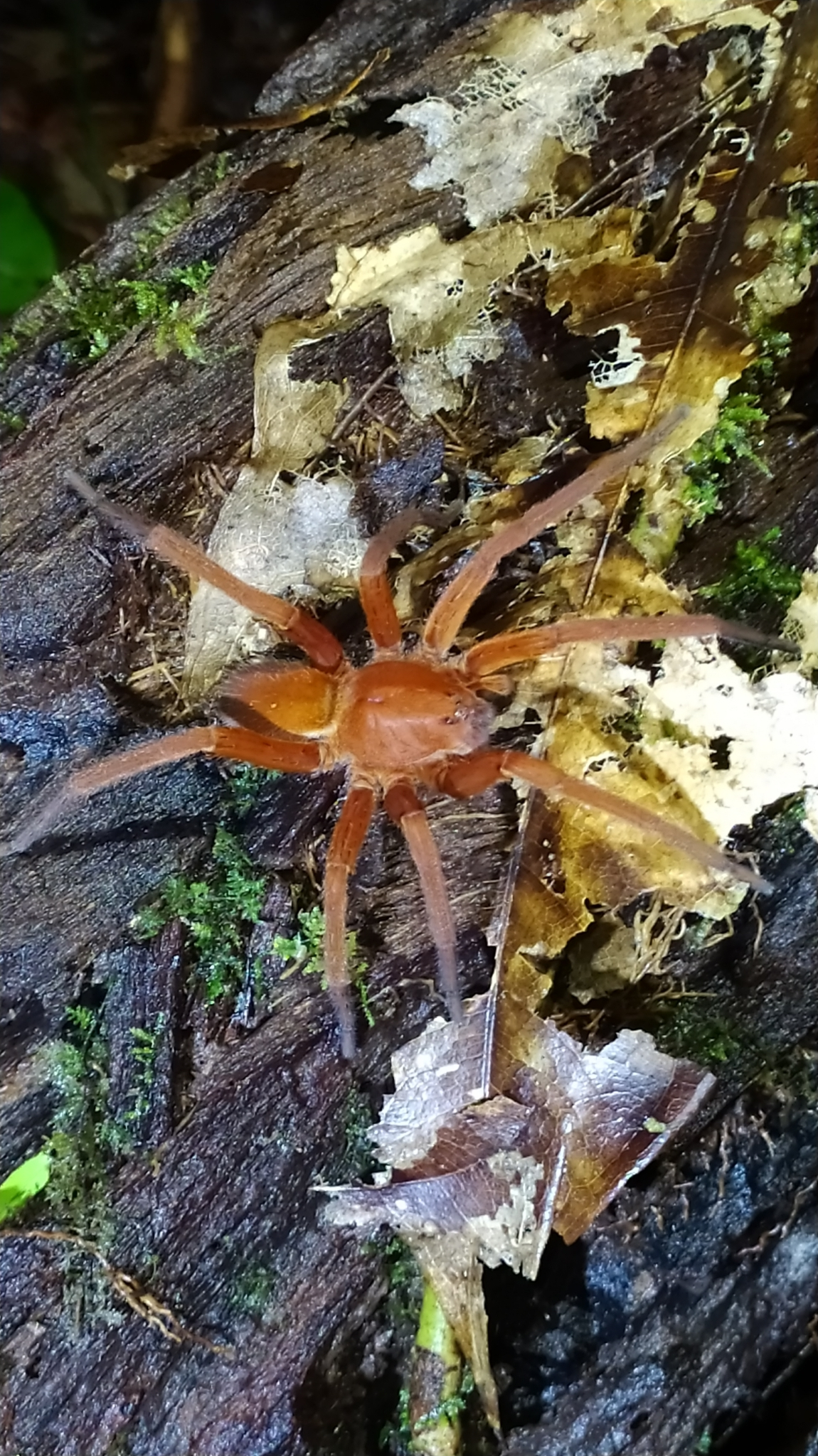

Scientific classification
- Kingdom: Animalia
- Phylum: Arthropoda
- Subphylum: Chelicerata
- Class: Arachnida
- Order: Araneae
- Infraorder: Araneomorphae
- Family: Ancylometidae
- Genus: Ancylometes
- Species: A. rufus

Binomial name
- Ancylometes rufus (Walckenaer, 1837)

= Ancylometes rufus =

Species of spider

Ancylometes rufus is a species from the genus Ancylometes. The species was originally described by Charles Athanase Walckenaer in 1837. It is typically found near water. It has been seen predating on frogs, Dendropsophus melanargyreus and Ameerega trivittata

Predation of another spider by Ancylometes rufus.
