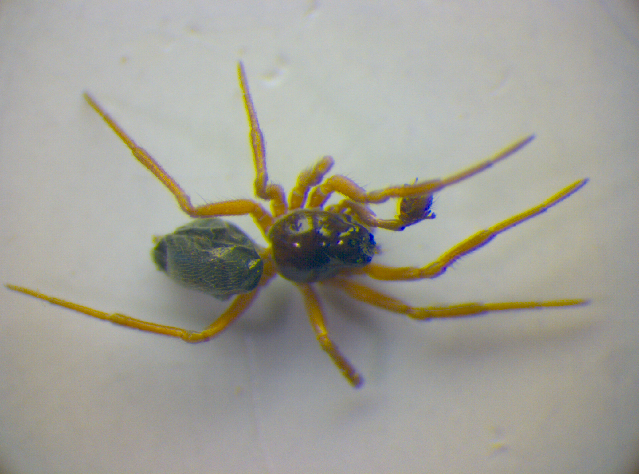
- A. humilis

Scientific classification
- Kingdom: Animalia
- Phylum: Arthropoda
- Subphylum: Chelicerata
- Class: Arachnida
- Order: Araneae
- Infraorder: Araneomorphae
- Family: Linyphiidae
- Genus: Araeoncus; Simon, 1884

Type species
- A. humilis (Blackwall, 1841)

Species
- 39, see text

= Araeoncus =

Genus of spiders

Araeoncus is a genus of dwarf spiders that was first described by Eugène Louis Simon in 1884. They closely resemble members of Diplocephalus; both genera have a uniquely shaped of the cephalothorax and a species-specific modification of the tibial apophysis of the pedipalp.

== Species ==
As of May 2019 it contains thirty-nine species:

- Araeoncus altissimus Simon, 1884 – France, Italy, Azerbaijan
- Araeoncus anguineus (L. Koch, 1869) – Europe
- Araeoncus banias Tanasevitch, 2013 – Israel
- Araeoncus caucasicus Tanasevitch, 1987 – Ukraine, Caucasus, Iran, Central Asia
- Araeoncus clavatus Tanasevitch, 1987 – Turkey, Armenia
- Araeoncus clivifrons Deltshev, 1987 – Bulgaria
- Araeoncus convexus Tullgren, 1955 – Sweden, Estonia
- Araeoncus crassiceps (Westring, 1861) – Europe, Russia (Europe to South Siberia)
- Araeoncus curvatus Tullgren, 1955 – Sweden, Estonia
- Araeoncus cypriacus Tanasevitch, 2011 – Cyprus
- Araeoncus discedens (Simon, 1881) – Spain, France, Italy
- Araeoncus dispar Tullgren, 1955 – Sweden
- Araeoncus duriusculus Caporiacco, 1935 – Karakorum
- Araeoncus etinde Bosmans & Jocqué, 1983 – Cameroon
- Araeoncus femineus (Roewer, 1942) – Equatorial Guinea (Bioko)
- Araeoncus galeriformis (Tanasevitch, 1987) – Russia (Caucasus), Azerbaijan
- Araeoncus gertschi Caporiacco, 1949 – Kenya
- Araeoncus hanno Simon, 1884 – Algeria
- Araeoncus humilis (Blackwall, 1841) (type) – Europe, North Africa, Russia (Europe to South Siberia), Japan. Introduced to New Zealand
- Araeoncus hyalinus Song & Li, 2010 – China
- Araeoncus impolitus Holm, 1962 – Kenya
- Araeoncus longispineus Song & Li, 2010 – China
- Araeoncus longiusculus (O. Pickard-Cambridge, 1875) – France (Corsica), Italy (Sardinia, mainland)
- Araeoncus macrophthalmus Miller, 1970 – Angola
- Araeoncus malawiensis Jocqué, 1981 – Malawi
- Araeoncus martinae Bosmans, 1996 – Morocco, Algeria
- Araeoncus mitriformis Tanasevitch, 2008 – Turkey, Iran
- Araeoncus obtusus Bosmans & Jocqué, 1983 – Cameroon
- Araeoncus picturatus Holm, 1962 – Tanzania
- Araeoncus rhodes Tanasevitch, 2011 – Greece (Rhodes)
- Araeoncus sicanus Brignoli, 1979 – Italy (Sicily)
- Araeoncus subniger Holm, 1962 – Kenya
- Araeoncus tauricus Gnelitsa, 2004 – Bulgaria, Greece (Crete), Turkey, Ukraine
- Araeoncus toubkal Bosmans, 1996 – Portugal, Morocco
- Araeoncus tuberculatus Tullgren, 1955 – Sweden
- Araeoncus vaporariorum (O. Pickard-Cambridge, 1875) – France, Italy
- Araeoncus victorianyanzae Berland, 1936 – Kenya, Tanzania
- Araeoncus viphyensis Jocqué, 1981 – Malawi
- Araeoncus vorkutensis Tanasevitch, 1984 – Russia (Europe to South Siberia), Kazakhstan
