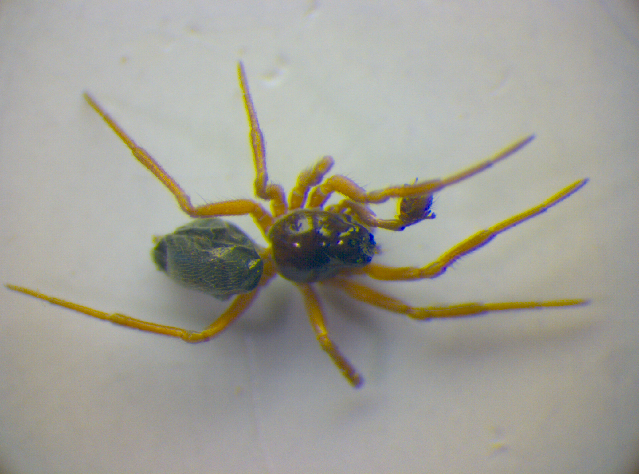

Scientific classification
- Domain: Eukaryota
- Kingdom: Animalia
- Phylum: Arthropoda
- Subphylum: Chelicerata
- Class: Arachnida
- Order: Araneae
- Infraorder: Araneomorphae
- Family: Linyphiidae
- Genus: Araeoncus
- Species: A. humilis

Binomial name
- Araeoncus humilis (Blackwall, 1841)

Synonyms
- Walckenaera humilis; Argus humilis; Lophocarenum globiceps; Erigone humilis; Araeoncus humilis; Diplocephalus humilis

= Araeoncus humilis =

Species of spider

Araeoncus humilis is a species of sheet weaver spider.

== Taxonomy ==
This species was first described as Walckenaera humilis in 1841 by John Blackwall. It was most recently revised in 2010.

== Distribution ==
This species is known from Europe, North Africa, Russia (Europe to South Siberia), Iran, Japan. It as also been introduced to New Zealand.
