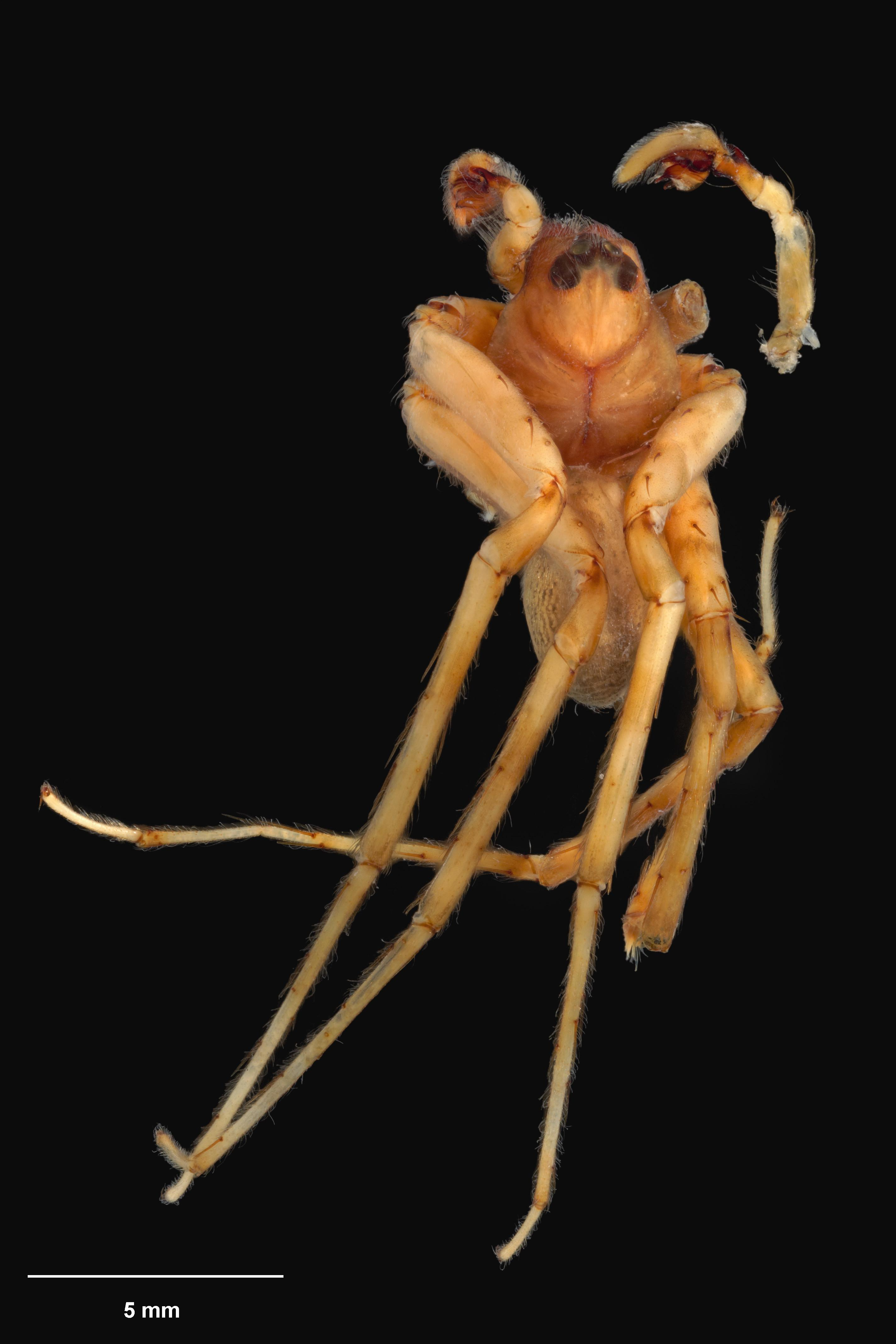

Conservation status
- Not Threatened (NZ TCS)

Scientific classification
- Kingdom: Animalia
- Phylum: Arthropoda
- Subphylum: Chelicerata
- Class: Arachnida
- Order: Araneae
- Infraorder: Araneomorphae
- Family: Cycloctenidae
- Genus: Cycloctenus
- Species: C. nelsonensis

Binomial name
- Cycloctenus nelsonensis Forster, 1979

= Cycloctenus nelsonensis =

Species of spider

Cycloctenus nelsonensis is a species of Cycloctenidae spider endemic to New Zealand.

== Taxonomy ==
This species was described in 1979 by Ray Forster from male and female specimens. The holotype is stored in Te Papa Museum under registration number AS.000076.

== Description ==
The male is recorded at 9.9 mm (0.39 in) in length whereas the female is 12.9 mm (0.51 in). This species has various brown and black markings of varying darkness throughout the body.

== Distribution ==
This species is only known from Nelson and Marlborough in New Zealand.

== Conservation status ==
Under the New Zealand Threat Classification System, this species is listed as "Not Threatened".
