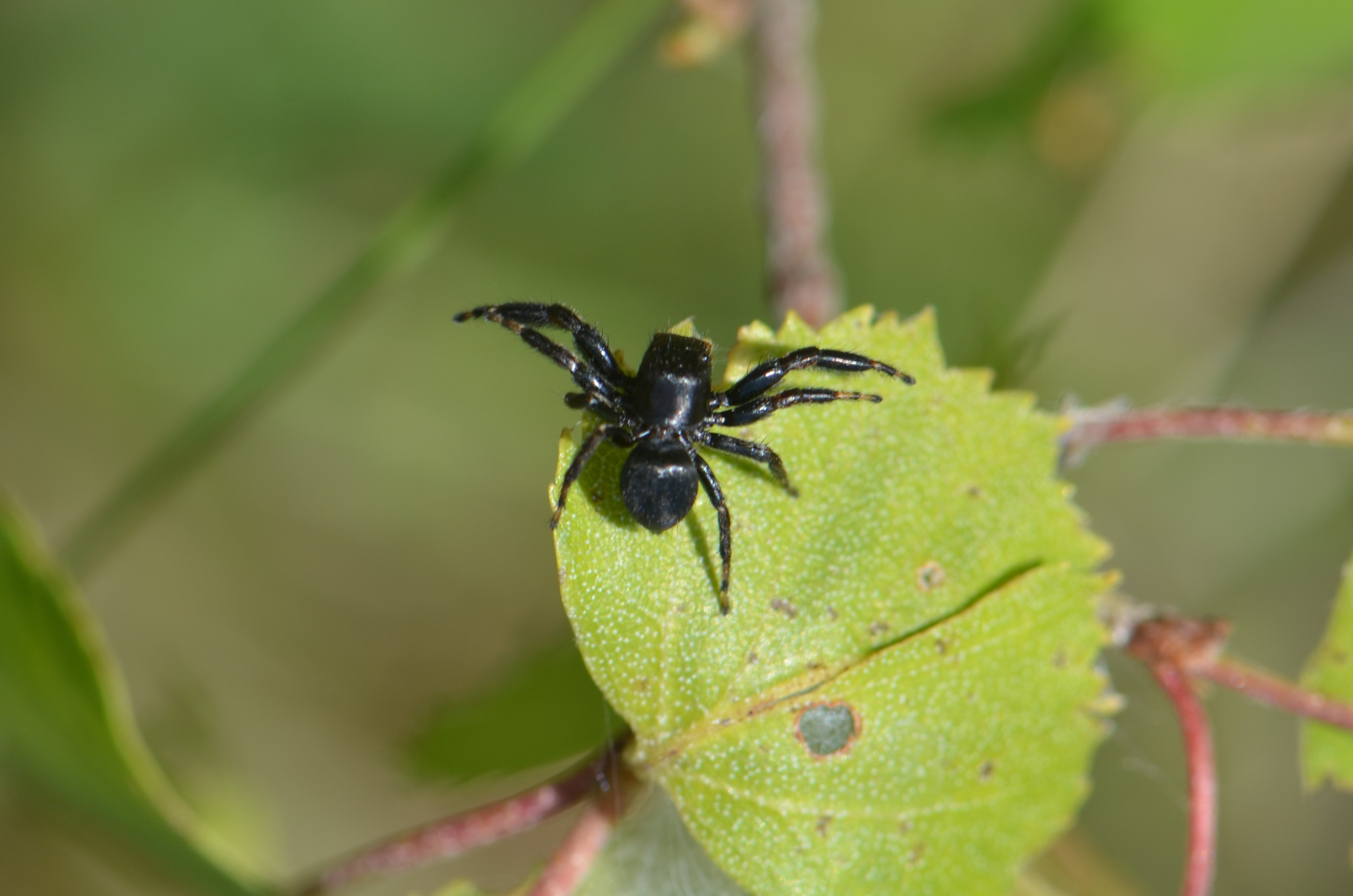
- The related species Chalcoscirtus infimus

Scientific classification
- Kingdom: Animalia
- Phylum: Arthropoda
- Subphylum: Chelicerata
- Class: Arachnida
- Order: Araneae
- Infraorder: Araneomorphae
- Family: Salticidae
- Genus: Chalcoscirtus
- Species: C. lepidus

Binomial name
- Chalcoscirtus lepidus Wesołowska, 1996

= Chalcoscirtus lepidus =

Species of spider

Chalcoscirtus lepidus is a species of jumping spider in the genus Chalcoscirtus that has been found in Afghanistan, Iran, Tajikistan, Turkmenistan and Uzbekistan. The spider was first described in 1996 by Wanda Wesołowska, although the first male was identified three years later. The spider is small, with a carapace between 1.06 and 1.2 mm (0.04 and 0.05 in) long and an abdomen between 1.03 and 2.2 mm (0.04 and 0.09 in) long. The female is larger and lighter than the male and has three narrower stripes on the back while the male has a large scutum. In both cases, the carapace is plain. The scutum and lack of pattern on the carapace help distinguish the spider from related species. It can also be identified by its copulatory organs, particularly the long curved embolus on the male and the position of the copulatory openings on the female epigyne, which differ from the otherwise similar Chalcoscirtus infimus.

== Taxonomy ==
Chalcoscirtus lepidus is a jumping spider that was first described by Wanda Wesołowska in 1996. It is one of over 500 species identified by the Polish arachnologist during her career. She allocated the species to the genus Chalcoscirtus. The genus was first circumscribed by Philipp Bertkau in 1880. The genus name derives from two Greek words, meaning bronze falcon. The species name is a Latin word that can be translated elegant. In Wayne Maddison's 2015 study of spider phylogenetic classification, the genus Chalcoscirtus was placed in the tribe Euophryini. The tribe was part of the clade Simonida within the subfamily Saltafresia. The clade was named in honour of the arachnologist Eugène Simon. Two years later, in 2017, Jerzy Prószyński grouped the genus with nine other genera of jumping spiders under the name Euophryines, which was named after the genus Euophrys. He used the shape of the embolus and spermathecae as distinguishing signs for the group. Euophryines is itself placed within a supergroup named Euophryoida.

== Description ==
Chalcoscirtus lepidus is a small spider. The male has a brown carapace that is typically 1.06 mm (0.04 in) long and 0.69 mm (0.03 in) wide. It has a pattern of black veins and has a sparse covering of light elongated scales. The eye field is dark brown with the area around the eyes is black. The spider's face, clypeus, is yellow-brown and hairless. The spider's mouthparts, the chelicerae and labium maxilae, are yellow with a hint of brown. The underside of the carapace, the sternum, is yellow with brown margins. The abdomen is yellow with three brown stripes down the back and a distinctive large scutum. It is typically 1.03 mm (0.04 in) long and 0.69 mm (0.03 in) wide. The sides are yellow-grey and underside is yellow. The spinnerets and legs are also yellow. The spider has distinctive copulatory organs. The palpal bulb has a cymbium that is typical for the genus and a long bent tibial apophysis. The spider has a long thin embolus that curves into the bulb.

The female is larger than the male. It has a fawn-brown carapace that is between 1.1 and 1.2 mm (0.04 and 0.05 in) long and typically 0.8 mm (0.03 in) wide. The eye field is short, nearly black with a blue metallic tint and has a sparse covering of white hairs. The chelicerae are brown with two small teeth to the front and none to the back. The yellow elongated abdomen is significantly larger, between 2.1 and 2.2 mm (0.08 and 0.09 in) long and 1.3 mm (0.05 in) wide, with a pattern of three parallel narrow brown stripes on the top. The spinnerets and legs are yellow like the male. The epigyne has two round barely visible copulatory openings that lead to twisted insemination ducts and bean-shaped receptacles.

The spider is similar to others in the genus. The female can be distinguished from the related Chalcoscirtus infimus by the position of the copulatory ducts. Chalcoscirtus kamchik is similar except that the abdomen has brown stripes on a yellow background while the other species has them reversed, yellow stripes on a brown background. It has similarities to Chalcoscirtus zyuzini, but differs in the lack of stripes on the topside of the carapace, the scutum on the abdomen and curved embolus.

== Distribution ==
Chalcoscirtus species are mostly found in Central Asia. Chalcoscirtus lepidus lives in Afghanistan, Iran, Tajikistan, Turkmenistan and Uzbekistan. The holotype, a female, was collected from the Chilmamedkum Desert near Türkmenbaşy, Turkmenistan, in 1987. Other examples, including the first male to be identified, were found approximately 20 km (12 mi) southeast of Pulikhatum in the Gezgyadyk Mountain Range at altitudes between 1,000 and 1,100 m (3,300 and 3,600 ft) above sea level in 1993, although they were not described until 1999. Others live in the Zulfagar Mountain Range and Badhyz State Nature Reserve. Meanwhile, the first examples living in Tajikistan had been discovered in 1991 in Khatlon Region and in Uzbekistan in 1986 near Samarkand. The species range was later extended to include Iran, particularly an area 50 km (31 mi) north-northeast of Shiraz. The first example from Afghanistan was found in 1963 in Uaidan-Täl at an altitude of 2,560 m (8,400 ft) above sea level but was not identified until 2005.
