= Cycloctenus paturau =

Conservation status
- Naturally Uncommon (NZ TCS)

Scientific classification
- Kingdom: Animalia
- Phylum: Arthropoda
- Subphylum: Chelicerata
- Class: Arachnida
- Order: Araneae
- Infraorder: Araneomorphae
- Family: Cycloctenidae
- Genus: Cycloctenus
- Species: C. paturau

Binomial name
- Cycloctenus paturau Forster, 1979

Species of spider

Cycloctenus paturau is a species of Cycloctenidae spider endemic to New Zealand.

== Taxonomy ==
This species was described in 1979 by Ray Forster from male and female specimens. The holotype is stored in the New Zealand Arthropod Collection under registration number NZAC03014961.

== Description ==
The male is recorded at 11.8mm in length whereas the female is 10.8mm. The body is coloured yellow brown and has very few dark markings.

== Distribution and habitat ==
This species is only known from Nelson, New Zealand. It is apparently restricted to caves.

== Conservation status ==
Under the New Zealand Threat Classification System, this species is listed as "Naturally Uncommon" with the qualifiers of "Range Restricted".
