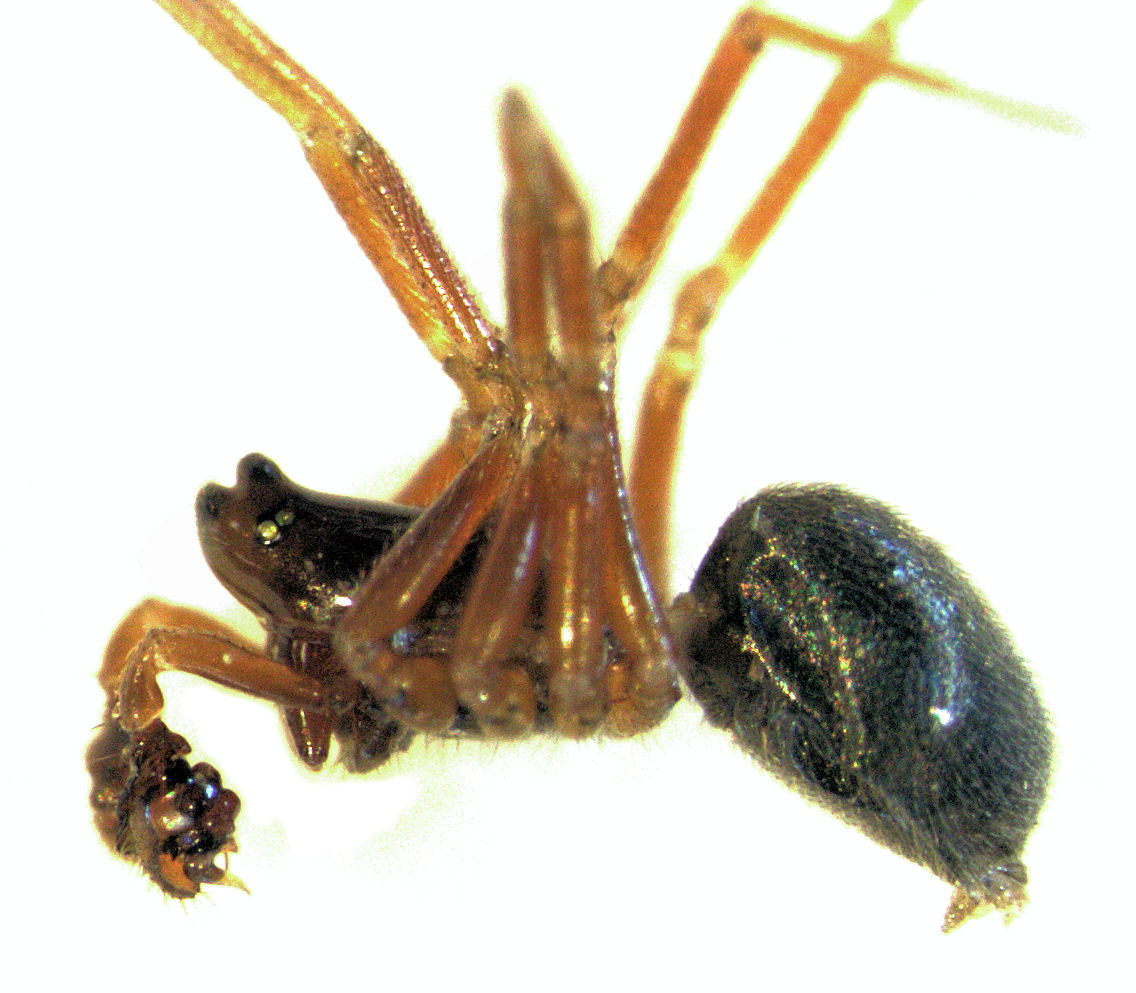

Scientific classification
- Domain: Eukaryota
- Kingdom: Animalia
- Phylum: Arthropoda
- Subphylum: Chelicerata
- Class: Arachnida
- Order: Araneae
- Infraorder: Araneomorphae
- Family: Linyphiidae
- Genus: Diplocephalus
- Species: D. cristatus

Binomial name
- Diplocephalus cristatus (Blackwall, 1833)

Synonyms
- Walckenaeria cristatus; Theridion bicorne; Argus bicornis; Micryphantes caespitum; Erigone bicornis; Melicertus bicornis; Lophomma bicorne; Erigone cristata; Erigone foraminifera; Lophomma cristata; Prosoponcus bicephalus; Prosoponcus cristatus; Prosoponcus foraminifer; Prosoponcus thyrsiger; Prosoponcus rectiloba; Diplocephalus crassilobus; Diplocephalus bicephalus; Lophomma cristatus; Diplocephalus arvernus

= Diplocephalus cristatus =

Species of spider

Diplocephalus cristatus is a species of sheet weaver spider.

== Taxonomy ==
This species was first described as Walckenaeria cristatus in 1833 by John Blackwall.

== Distribution ==
This species is known from Europe, Russia (Far East), Kazakhstan. It has all been introduced to North America, the Falkland Islands and New Zealand.
