= Carl Friedrich Roewer =

German arachnologist

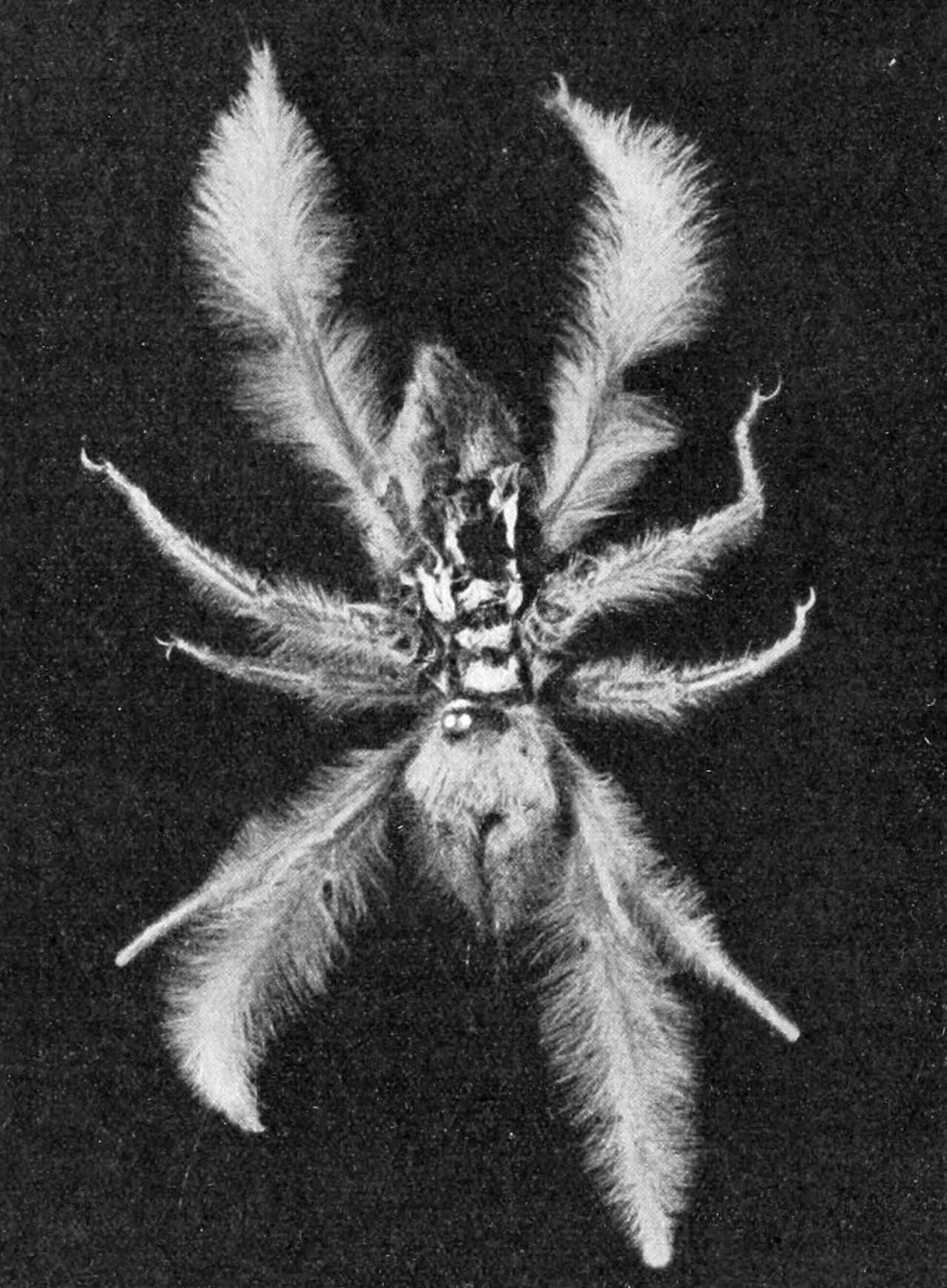
Type of spider : Paragaleodes sericeus - female

Carl Friedrich Roewer (12 October 1881, in Neustrelitz – 17 June 1963) was a German arachnologist. He concentrated on harvestmen, where he described almost a third (2,260) of today's known species, but also almost 700 taxa of spiders and numerous Solifugae.

After earning his D.Phil., he was appointed senior assistant to Ernst Haeckel at the Zoological Institute of Jena. Later he was appointed zoologist at the Zoological Museum, Hamburg where he worked with the arachnologist Karl Kraepelin. From 1933 on, he was the second director of the Übersee-Museum in Bremen, Germany. Under his direction the museum intensified its advocacy of scientific racism.

The Senckenbergische Naturforschende Gesellschaft bought his extensive collection (including type material from other arachnologists such as L. Koch, Eugène Simon, Thorell, Philipp Bertkau and Friedrich Dahl) and his private library. Some of his specimens are also in the Museum für Naturkunde Berlin.
