= Dendropsophus melanargyreus =

Conservation status
- Least Concern (IUCN 3.1)

Scientific classification
- Kingdom: Animalia
- Phylum: Chordata
- Class: Amphibia
- Order: Anura
- Family: Hylidae
- Genus: Dendropsophus
- Species: D. melanargyreus

Binomial name
- Dendropsophus melanargyreus (Cope, 1887)

Species of amphibian

Dendropsophus melanargyreus is a species of mid-size tree frog in the family Hylidae. It is found in Bolivia, Brazil, French Guiana, Paraguay, and Suriname. Its natural habitats are subtropical or tropical dry forests, subtropical or tropical moist lowland forests, and intermittent freshwater marshes. It is threatened by habitat loss.

D. melanargyreus is characterized by having dark blotches on its back, ranging in color from gray and tan to dark yellows and browns. It normally possesses a reddish brown X that descends from the upper eyelids and descends to the lower back. The underside is usually white and pale yellow in coloration with speckled black blotches. It is one of eight species in the Dendropsophus marmoratus group, which are all characterized by warty skin around the lower lip, large vocal sacs, and marbled dorsal patterns.
