= Rogmocrypta =

Scientific classification
- Kingdom: Animalia
- Phylum: Arthropoda
- Subphylum: Chelicerata
- Class: Arachnida
- Order: Araneae
- Infraorder: Araneomorphae
- Family: Salticidae
- Subfamily: Salticinae
- Genus: Rogmocrypta; Simon, 1900

Type species
- Chalcoscirtus elegans Simon, 1885

Species
- See text.

Genus of spiders

Rogmocrypta is a spider genus of the jumping spider family, Salticidae.

== Description ==
The short carapace of R. puta is orange, with a black eye area. The oval abdomen is about as long, but not as wide as the carapace. The scutum of males is shiny dark orange. The legs are pale orange.

== Species ==
- Rogmocrypta elegans (Simon, 1885) – New Caledonia
- Rogmocrypta nigella Simon, 1900 – Philippines
- Rogmocrypta puta Simon, 1900 – Singapore
