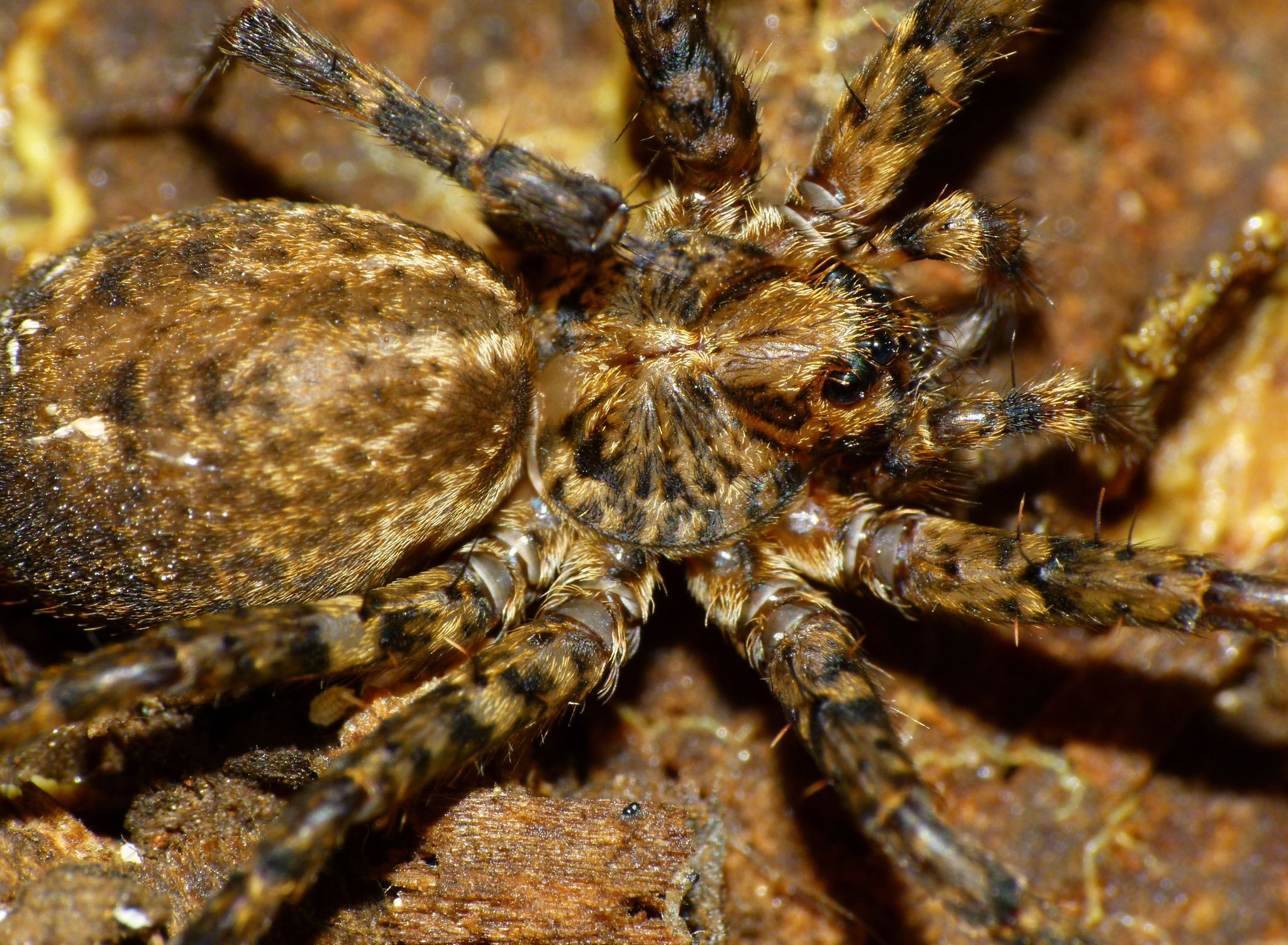

Conservation status
- Not Threatened (NZ TCS)

Scientific classification
- Domain: Eukaryota
- Kingdom: Animalia
- Phylum: Arthropoda
- Subphylum: Chelicerata
- Class: Arachnida
- Order: Araneae
- Infraorder: Araneomorphae
- Family: Cycloctenidae
- Genus: Cycloctenus
- Species: C. fugax

Binomial name
- Cycloctenus fugax Goyen, 1890

= Cycloctenus fugax =

Species of spider

Cycloctenus fugax is a species of Cycloctenidae spider endemic to New Zealand.

== Taxonomy ==
This species was described in 1890 by Peter Goyen from female specimens. It was most recently revised in 1979. The type material is considered lost.

== Description ==
The male is recorded at 9.6mm in length whereas the female is 11.7mm. This species has various brown and black markings of varying darkness throughout the body.

== Distribution ==
This species is only known from the Otago region of New Zealand. It occurs in forest and tussock habitats.

== Conservation status ==
Under the New Zealand Threat Classification System, this species is listed as "Not Threatened".
