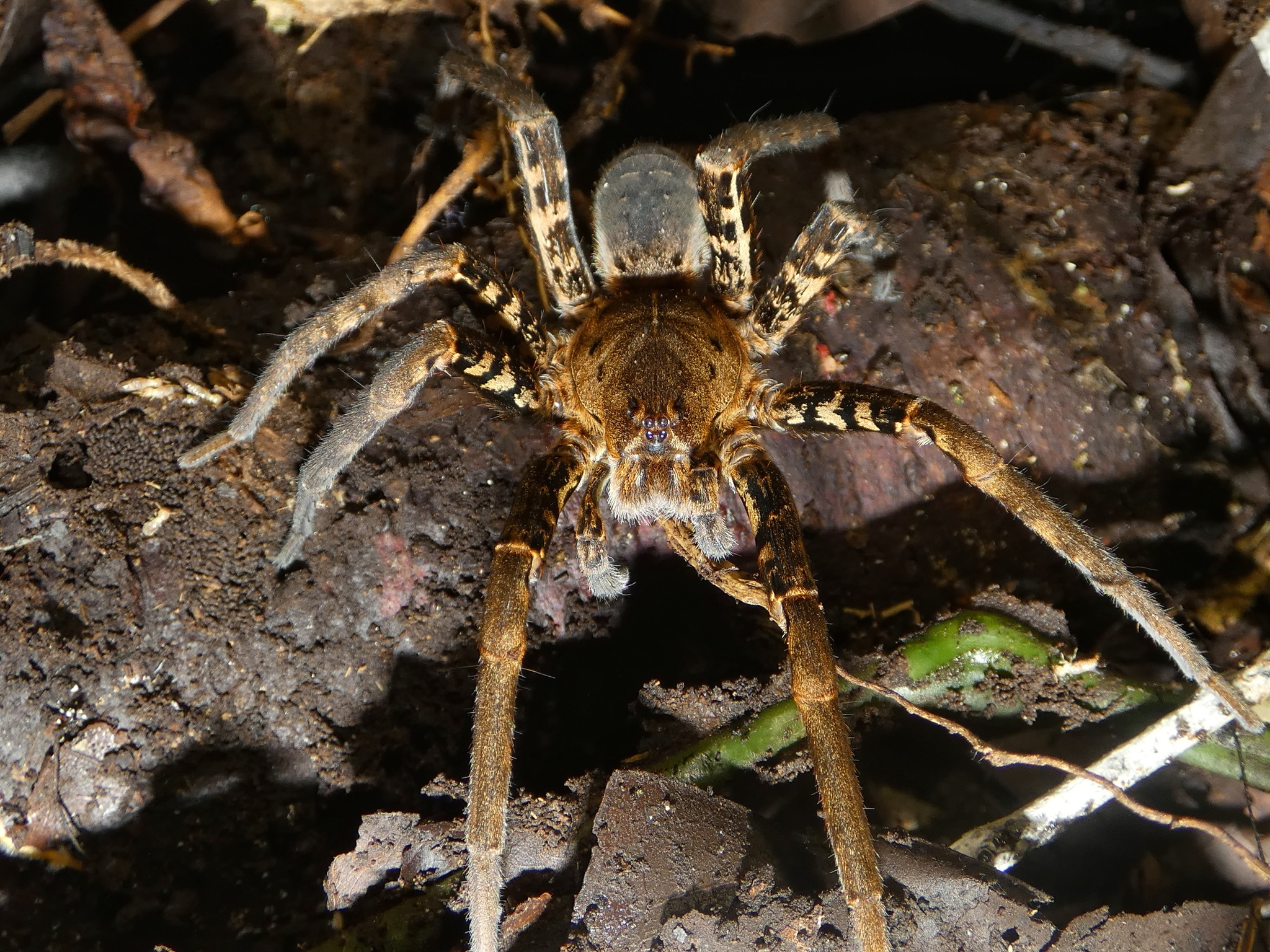
- female from Panama
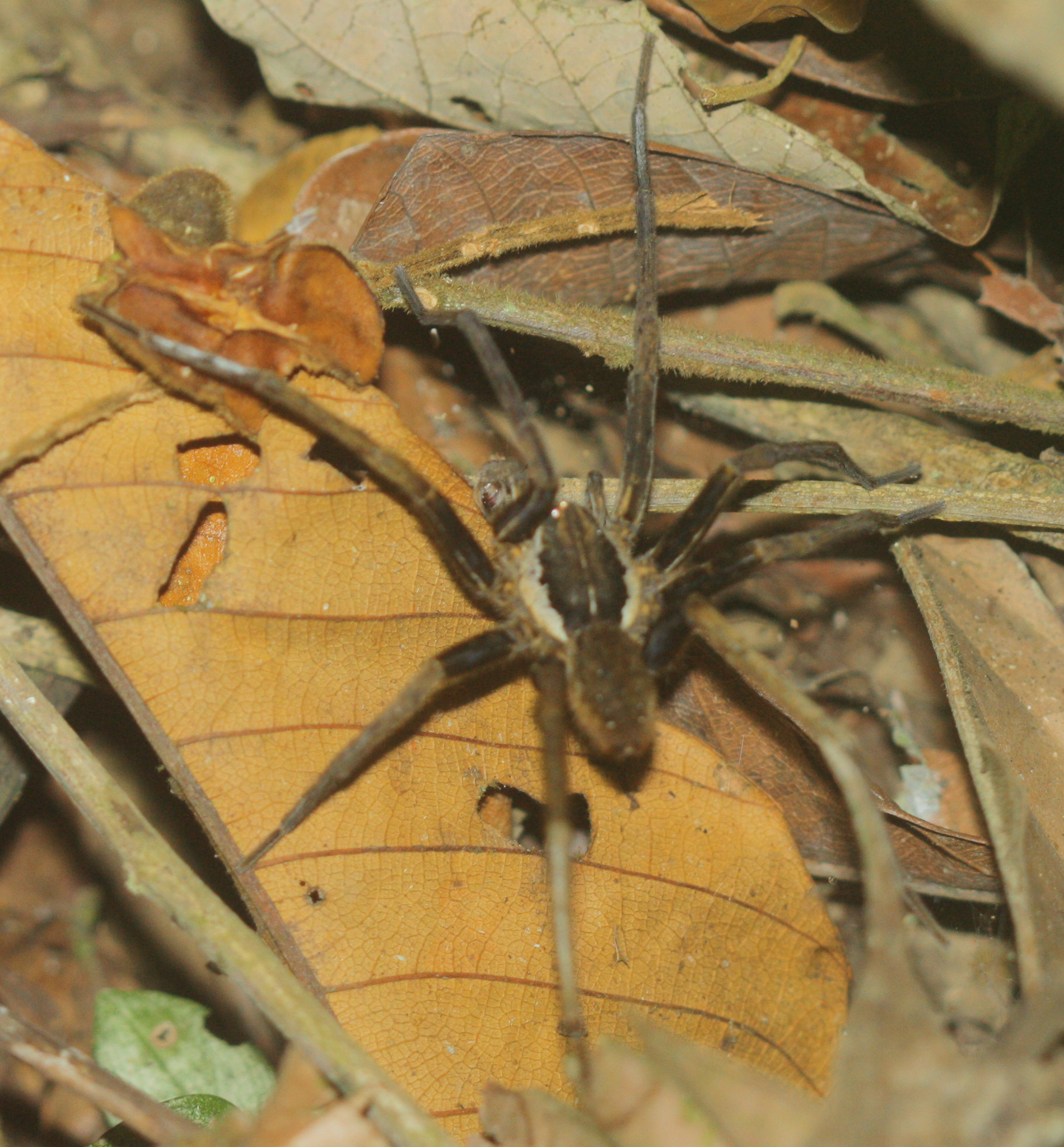
- male from Costa Rica

Scientific classification
- Kingdom: Animalia
- Phylum: Arthropoda
- Subphylum: Chelicerata
- Class: Arachnida
- Order: Araneae
- Infraorder: Araneomorphae
- Family: Ancylometidae
- Genus: Ancylometes
- Species: A. bogotensis

Binomial name
- Ancylometes bogotensis (Keyserling, 1877)

Synonyms
- Ctenus bogotensis Keyserling, 1877; Lycoctenus colombianus Pickard-Cambridge, 1897; Lycoctenus palustris Pickard-Cambridge, 1898; Ancylometes orinocensis Simon, 1898; Lycoctenus venezuelensis Strand, 1909; Lycoctenus caracasensis Strand, 1910; Ancylometes acostae Schenkel, 1953; Ctenus nasutus Kraus, 1955

= Ancylometes bogotensis =

Species of spider

Ancylometes bogotensis is a species of spider in the family Ancylometidae. It is widely distributed across northern and western South America and Central America, ranging from Honduras to Bolivia.

== Taxonomy ==
The species was originally described as Ctenus bogotensis by Eugen von Keyserling in 1877 based on a female specimen from Bogotá, Colombia. The species has a complex synonymy, with numerous species later determined to be the same taxon. A comprehensive revision by Höfer & Brescovit in 2000 synonymized eight previously recognized species with A. bogotensis, including Ancylometes orinocensis, Lycoctenus palustris, Lycoctenus venezuelensis, Lycoctenus caracasensis, Ancylometes acostae, and Ctenus nasutus.

== Distribution ==
A. bogotensis has been recorded from Nicaragua, Honduras, Panama, Costa Rica, Venezuela, Trinidad, Guyana, Colombia, Ecuador, Bolivia, and Brazil. The species shows a broad distribution pattern across the northern and western portions of South America, extending into Central America. Specimens collected in Recife, Brazil are considered likely introductions rather than part of the natural range.

== Habitat ==
In the Manaus region of Brazil, A. bogotensis is particularly abundant in floating meadows composed of Paspalum and other semi-aquatic and aquatic macrophytes surrounding islands in whitewater rivers like the Solimões River. The species also inhabits black- and whitewater inundation forests. These spiders are semi-aquatic and have been observed to hide underwater for up to 20 minutes when disturbed.

== Description ==
A. bogotensis shows considerable sexual dimorphism in size, with females being notably larger than males. Males have a total length of approximately 21 mm, while females reach about 26 mm.

In males, the prosoma is brown with distinctive broad lateral white bands, and the eye region is surrounded by white hairs. The chelicerae also have white hairs near their base. The abdomen and legs are yellowish brown. The male's reproductive structure (pedipalp) has characteristic features including an embolus with a small knob pointing toward a membranous lobe, and a distinctive hammer-like median apophysis.

Females have a uniform light brown coloration across the entire body, with femora showing patchy brown markings. The female reproductive opening (epigyne) features a narrow triangular median plate with a characteristic central, narrow but prominent protuberance.

Living specimens show some variation in coloration. Female prosomas are dark reddish brown with generally light brown abdomens. The clypeus and chelicerae are covered by white hairs, and the distal parts of the legs appear whitish due to hair coverage, while the femora are spotted with white hairs. Males are generally somewhat lighter brown, with the prosoma displaying broad lateral yellow bands.

== Behavior and reproduction ==
A. bogotensis is a semi-aquatic predator that has been observed hunting frogs and tadpoles. When disturbed, these spiders demonstrate remarkable aquatic adaptations by hiding underwater for extended periods. The courtship, mating behavior, and life cycle have been studied in laboratory populations. Females produce large egg sacs containing 300-400 eggs, though some egg sacs may contain up to 600 eggs. However, parasitism of eggs is common, with studies showing up to 200 eggs in a single sac being parasitized.
