= Diplocephalus subrostratus =

Conservation status
- Secure (NatureServe)

Scientific classification
- Kingdom: Animalia
- Phylum: Arthropoda
- Subphylum: Chelicerata
- Class: Arachnida
- Order: Araneae
- Infraorder: Araneomorphae
- Family: Linyphiidae
- Genus: Diplocephalus
- Species: D. subrostratus

Binomial name
- Diplocephalus subrostratus (O. P.-Cambridge, 1873)

Species of spider

Diplocephalus subrostratus is a species of dwarf spider in the family Linyphiidae. It is found in North America, Greenland, a range from Russia (European to Far East), and Mongolia.
