= Cycloctenus duplex =

Conservation status
- Not Threatened (NZ TCS)

Scientific classification
- Kingdom: Animalia
- Phylum: Arthropoda
- Subphylum: Chelicerata
- Class: Arachnida
- Order: Araneae
- Infraorder: Araneomorphae
- Family: Cycloctenidae
- Genus: Cycloctenus
- Species: C. duplex

Binomial name
- Cycloctenus duplex Forster, 1979

Species of spider

Cycloctenus duplex is a species of Cycloctenidae spider endemic to New Zealand.

== Taxonomy ==
This species was described in 1979 by Ray Forster from male and female specimens. The holotype is stored in Otago Museum.

== Description ==
The male is recorded at 10 mm (0.39 in) in length whereas the female is 15.2 mm (0.60 in). This species has various brown and black markings of varying darkness throughout the body. It is most similar to Cycloctenus westlandica but can be separated by differences in the genitalia.

== Distribution ==
This species is only known from Otago, New Zealand.

== Conservation status ==
Under the New Zealand Threat Classification System, this species is listed as "Not Threatened".
