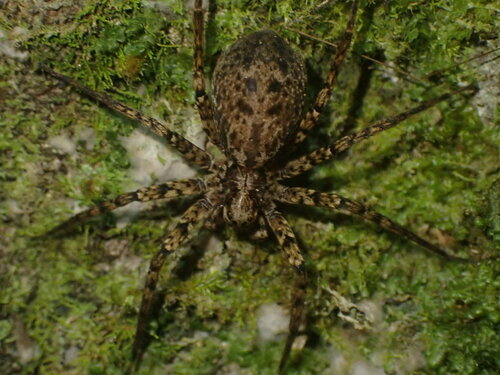

Conservation status
- Not Threatened (NZ TCS)

Scientific classification
- Domain: Eukaryota
- Kingdom: Animalia
- Phylum: Arthropoda
- Subphylum: Chelicerata
- Class: Arachnida
- Order: Araneae
- Infraorder: Araneomorphae
- Family: Cycloctenidae
- Genus: Cycloctenus
- Species: C. pulcher

Binomial name
- Cycloctenus pulcher Urquhart, 1891

= Cycloctenus pulcher =

Species of spider

Cycloctenus pulcher is a species of Cycloctenidae spider endemic to New Zealand.

== Taxonomy ==
This species was described in 1890 by Arthur Urquhart from a female specimen. It was most recently revised in 1979, in which the male was described. The holotype is considered lost.

== Description ==
The male is recorded at 8.5mm in length whereas the female is 15.5mm. This species has various brown and black markings of varying darkness throughout the body.

== Distribution ==
This species is only known from Wellington and Marlborough in New Zealand.

== Conservation status ==
Under the New Zealand Threat Classification System, this species is listed as "Not Threatened".
