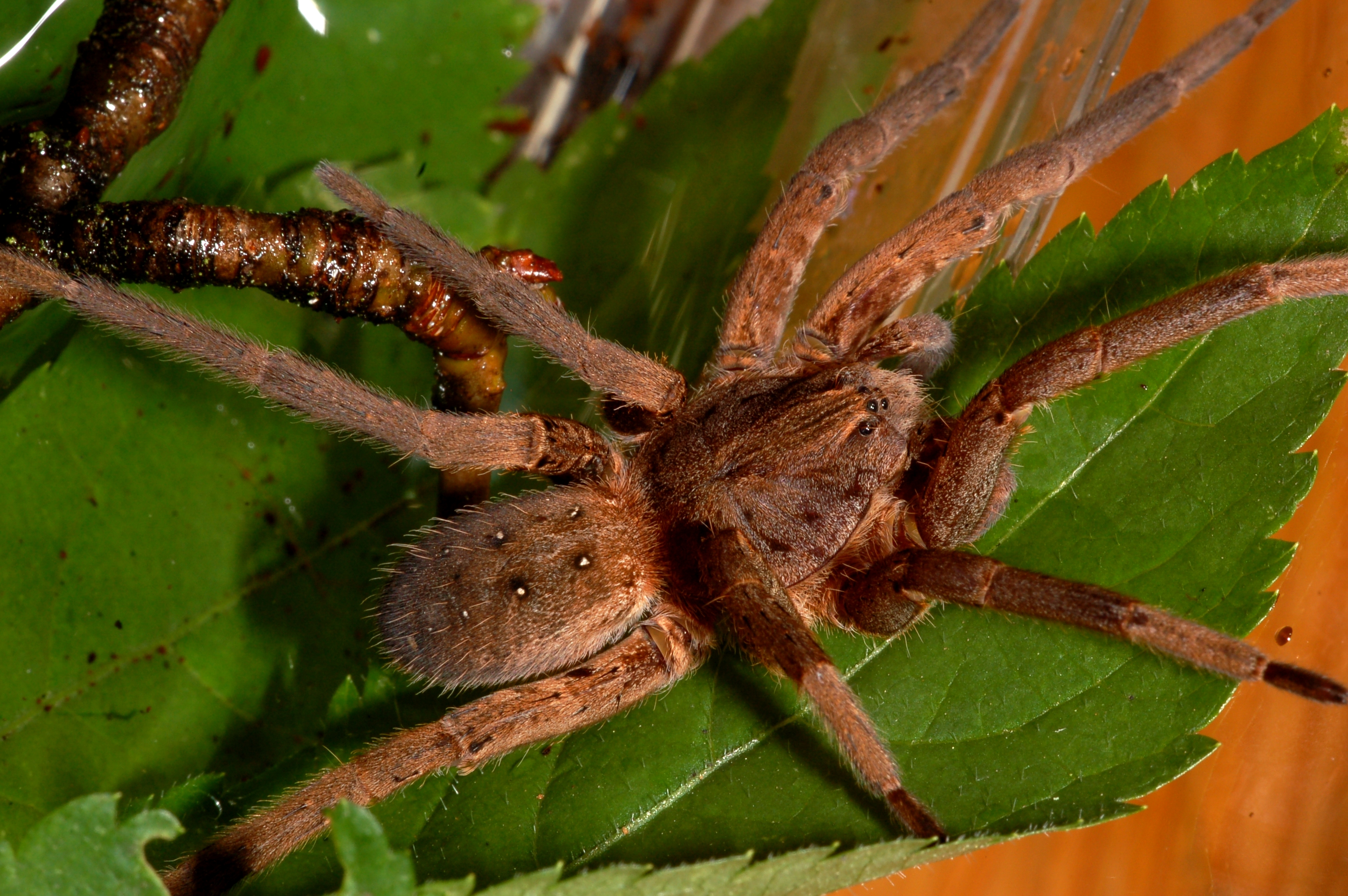
- Ancylometes bogotensis

Scientific classification
- Kingdom: Animalia
- Phylum: Arthropoda
- Subphylum: Chelicerata
- Class: Arachnida
- Order: Araneae
- Infraorder: Araneomorphae
- Family: Ancylometidae; Hazzi, Wood & Hormiga, 2025
- Genus: Ancylometes; Bertkau, 1880

Type species
- A. concolor (Perty, 1833)

Species
- 10, see text
- blue: reported countries (WSC) green: observation hotspots (iNaturalist)

Synonyms
- Corinoctenus Mello-Leitão, 1939

= Ancylometes =

Genus of spiders

Ancylometes is a genus of Central and South American semiaquatic spiders first described by Philipp Bertkau in 1880. Originally placed with the nursery web spiders, it was moved to the Ctenidae in 1967 and in 2025 transferred to the new family Ancylometidae, of which it is the only member. The genus name is derived in part from Ancient Greek "ἀγκύλος" (ancylo-), meaning "crooked, bent".

These spiders live near ponds, lakes, rivers and other freshwater habitats, and can walk on water like water striders due to fine air-trapping hairs on the tips of their legs. They can also dive under the surface, and can stay underwater for over an hour by using the air trapped in hairs surrounding their book lungs. They will consume anything from insects to small lizards and, occasionally, small fish.

== Description ==
Members of Ancylometes are among the largest araneomorph spiders, with a typical body length of 1.5 to 4 cm (0.59 to 1.57 in). They are sometimes referred to as "giant fishing spiders" to distinguish them from Dolomedes, a genus of smaller spiders also called "fishing spiders". The largest species is A. rufus, with females that grow to a body length of 5 cm (2.0 in) and a leg span of 12 cm (4.7 in). Males of the species only grow up to 3 cm (1.2 in) in body length, but usually have longer legs than the females. Both sexes are brown with dark spots on the abdomen, and males have two thin lines along their carapace.

They have a 2-4-2 eye pattern and a reduced third claw, characteristics of the Ctenidae and Pisauridae, respectively. Members of this genus can be distinguished from all others by ventral spines found on the tarsi of the third and fourth legs.

Ancylometes and the more fully aquatic Argyroneta are the only known genera of spiders that can spin webs in water. Though these webs can catch fish, they mostly prey on fish by diving down or lying in wait until prey passes within striking distance. Once caught, these spiders will bring their prey back to the surface before eating it.

During mating, the male wraps the female with silk, and the female enters an immobile state. After about a week, she produces a cocoon and carries it with her fangs. After a month, she builds a nursery web above the ground, about 10 centimetres (3.9 in) in diameter. Over one hundred baby spiders will hatch inside this egg case, each only about 2 millimetres (0.079 in) long. The baby spiders take about a year to mature. Males only live for sixteen months at most, while females can live for more than two years.

The venom of Acyclomete sp, has effects on muscle contraction and preparation of the phrenic nerve diaphragm muscle, 50 μg causes depolarization of the diaphragm muscle fiber membranes. These studies indicate that the Ancylometes venom activates voltage-gated sodium channels. All of these effects of Ancylometes sp. venom on this nerve muscle preparation increase in twitch tension.

== Species ==
As of October 2026, this genus includes ten species:

- Ancylometes amazonicus Simon, 1898 – Peru, Brazil
- Ancylometes bogotensis (Keyserling, 1877) – Honduras to Bolivia
- Ancylometes concolor (Perty, 1833) – Brazil, Bolivia, Paraguay, Argentina
- Ancylometes hewitsoni (F. O. Pickard-Cambridge, 1897) – Bolivia, Brazil
- Ancylometes japura Höfer & Brescovit, 2000 – Brazil
- Ancylometes jau Höfer & Brescovit, 2000 – Brazil
- Ancylometes pantanal Höfer & Brescovit, 2000 – Brazil
- Ancylometes riparius Höfer & Brescovit, 2000 – Brazil
- Ancylometes rufus (Walckenaer, 1837) – Northern South America
- Ancylometes terrenus Höfer & Brescovit, 2000 – Brazil
