= Cycloctenus centralis =

Conservation status
- Not Threatened (NZ TCS)

Scientific classification
- Kingdom: Animalia
- Phylum: Arthropoda
- Subphylum: Chelicerata
- Class: Arachnida
- Order: Araneae
- Infraorder: Araneomorphae
- Family: Cycloctenidae
- Genus: Cycloctenus
- Species: C. centralis

Binomial name
- Cycloctenus centralis Forster, 1979

Species of spider

Cycloctenus centralis is a species of Cycloctenidae spider endemic to New Zealand.

== Taxonomy ==
This species was described in 1979 by Ray Forster from male and female specimens. The holotype is stored in Otago Museum.

== Description ==
The male is recorded at 10 mm (0.39 in) in length whereas the female is 10.3 mm (0.41 in). This species has various brown and black markings of varying darkness throughout the body.

== Distribution ==
This species is only known from the North Island of New Zealand.

== Conservation status ==
Under the New Zealand Threat Classification System, this species is listed as "Not Threatened".
