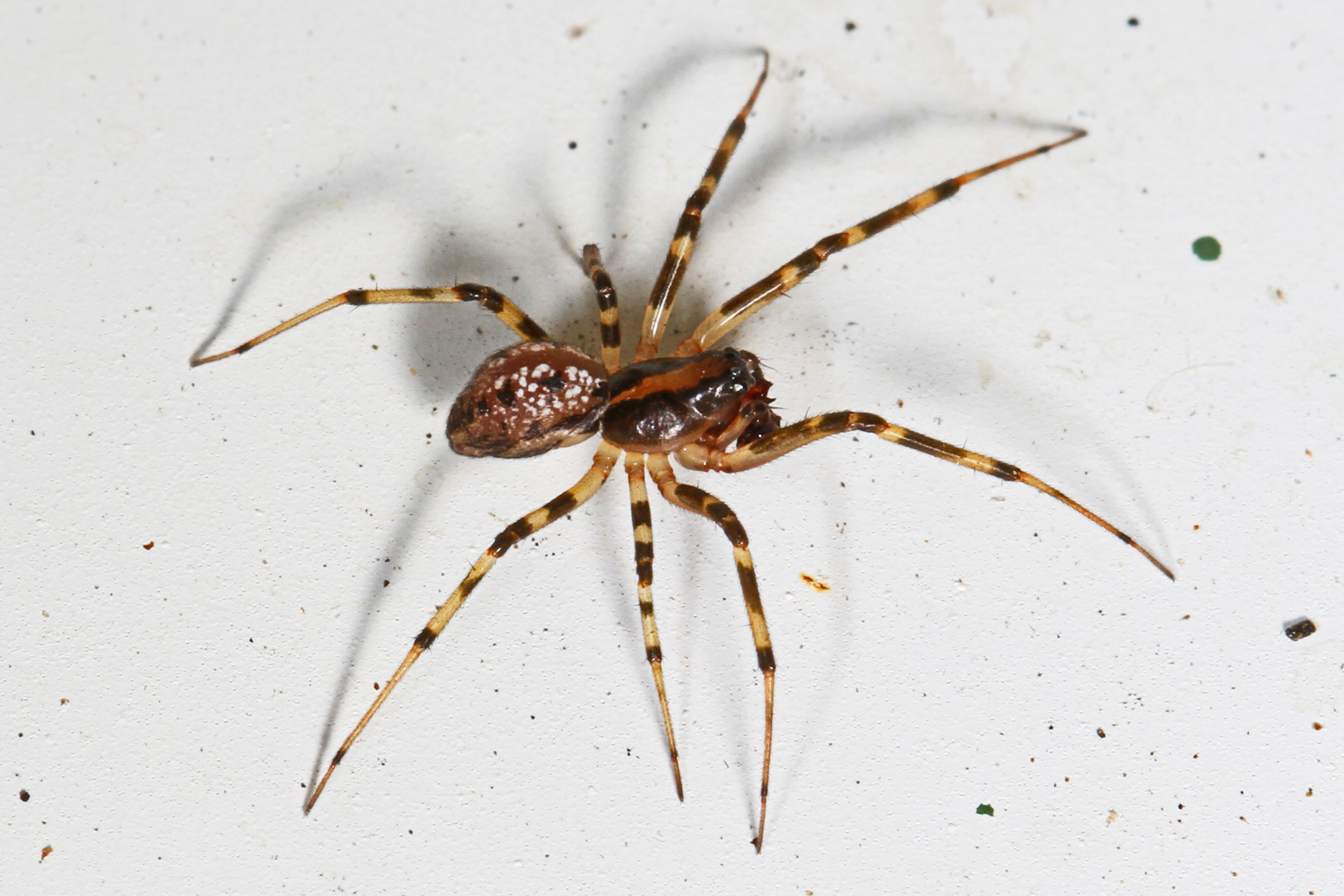
- T. bilineata in North America

Scientific classification
- Kingdom: Animalia
- Phylum: Arthropoda
- Subphylum: Chelicerata
- Class: Arachnida
- Order: Araneae
- Infraorder: Araneomorphae
- Family: Linyphiidae
- Genus: Tapinopa; Westring, 1851

Type species
- T. longidens (Wider, 1834)

Species
- 8, see text

= Tapinopa =

Genus of spiders

Tapinopa is a genus of sheet weavers that was first described by Niklas Westring in 1851.

== Distribution ==
Spiders in this genus are found in Asia, Europe, and the United States:

== Species ==
As of January 2026, this genus includes nine species:

- Tapinopa bilineata Banks, 1893 – Canada, United States
- Tapinopa disjugata Simon, 1884 – Algeria, Portugal, Spain, France, Italy (Sardinia)
- Tapinopa gerede Saaristo, 1997 – Turkey
- Tapinopa guttata Komatsu, 1937 – Russia (Far East), China, Japan
- Tapinopa hentzi Gertsch, 1951 – United States
- Tapinopa longicisterna Irfan, Zhang & Peng, 2022 – China
- Tapinopa longidens (Wider, 1834) – Europe, Turkey, Caucasus, Russia (Europe to West Siberia)
- Tapinopa undata Zhao & Li, 2014 – China, Vietnam, Malaysia (peninsula)
- Tapinopa vara Locket, 1982 – China, Thailand, Malaysia (peninsula), Indonesia (Sumatra)
