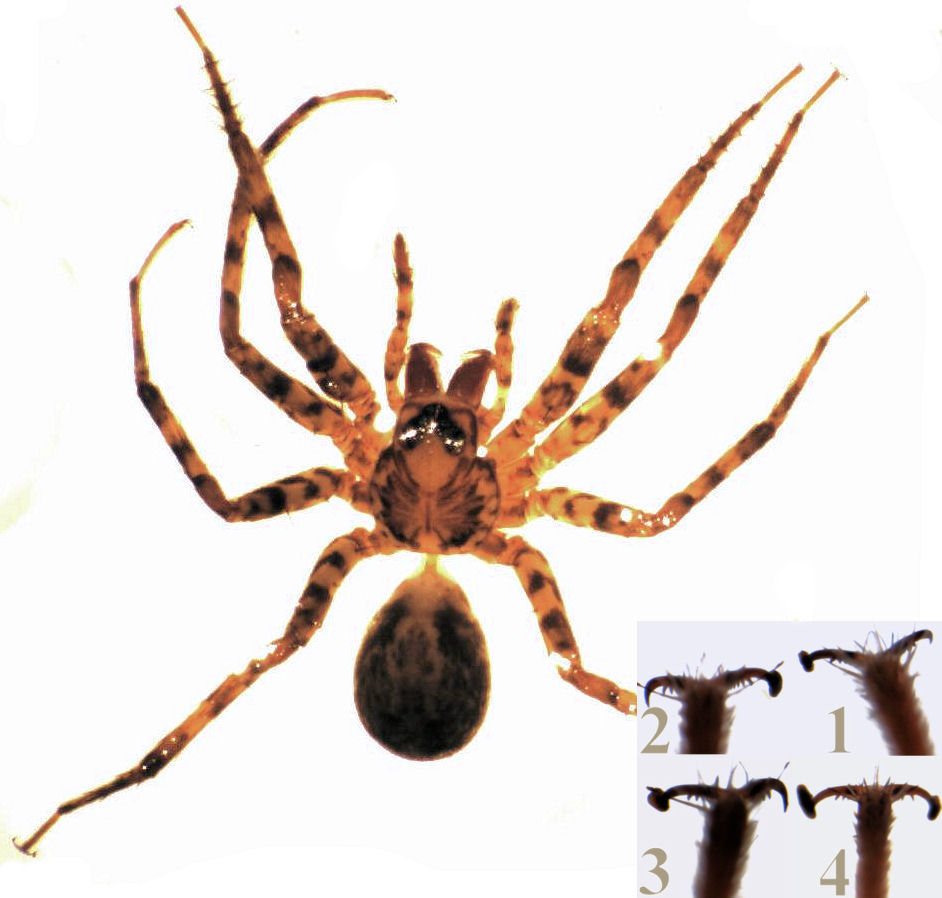
- Cycloctenus sp. (female)

Scientific classification
- Domain: Eukaryota
- Kingdom: Animalia
- Phylum: Arthropoda
- Subphylum: Chelicerata
- Class: Arachnida
- Order: Araneae
- Infraorder: Araneomorphae
- Family: Cycloctenidae
- Genus: Cycloctenus; L. Koch, 1878

Type species
- C. flaviceps L. Koch, 1878

Species
- 17, see text

Synonyms
- Pycnoctenus L. Koch, 1878

= Cycloctenus =

Genus of spiders

Cycloctenus is a genus of Australasian araneomorph spiders in the family Cycloctenidae, first described by L. Koch in 1878. Originally placed with the nursery web spiders, it was transferred to the family Toxopidae because of the distinctive arrangement of its eyes, particularly the enlarged posterolateral eyes. It was moved to the Cycloctenidae in 1967.

== Species ==
As of May 2019 it contains seventeen species:

- Cycloctenus abyssinus Urquhart, 1890 – Australia (New South Wales)
- Cycloctenus agilis Forster, 1979 – New Zealand
- Cycloctenus centralis Forster, 1979 – New Zealand
- Cycloctenus cryptophilus Hickman, 1981 – Australia (Tasmania)
- Cycloctenus duplex Forster, 1979 – New Zealand
- Cycloctenus fiordensis Forster, 1979 – New Zealand
- Cycloctenus flaviceps L. Koch, 1878 (type) – Australia
- Cycloctenus flavus Hickman, 1981 – Australia (Tasmania)
- Cycloctenus fugax Goyen, 1890 – New Zealand
- Cycloctenus infrequens Hickman, 1981 – Australia (Tasmania)
- Cycloctenus lepidus Urquhart, 1890 – New Zealand
- Cycloctenus montivagus Hickman, 1981 – Australia (Tasmania)
- Cycloctenus nelsonensis Forster, 1979 – New Zealand
- Cycloctenus paturau Forster, 1979 – New Zealand
- Cycloctenus pulcher Urquhart, 1891 – New Zealand
- Cycloctenus robustus (L. Koch, 1878) – Australia (New South Wales)
- Cycloctenus westlandicus Forster, 1964 – New Zealand
