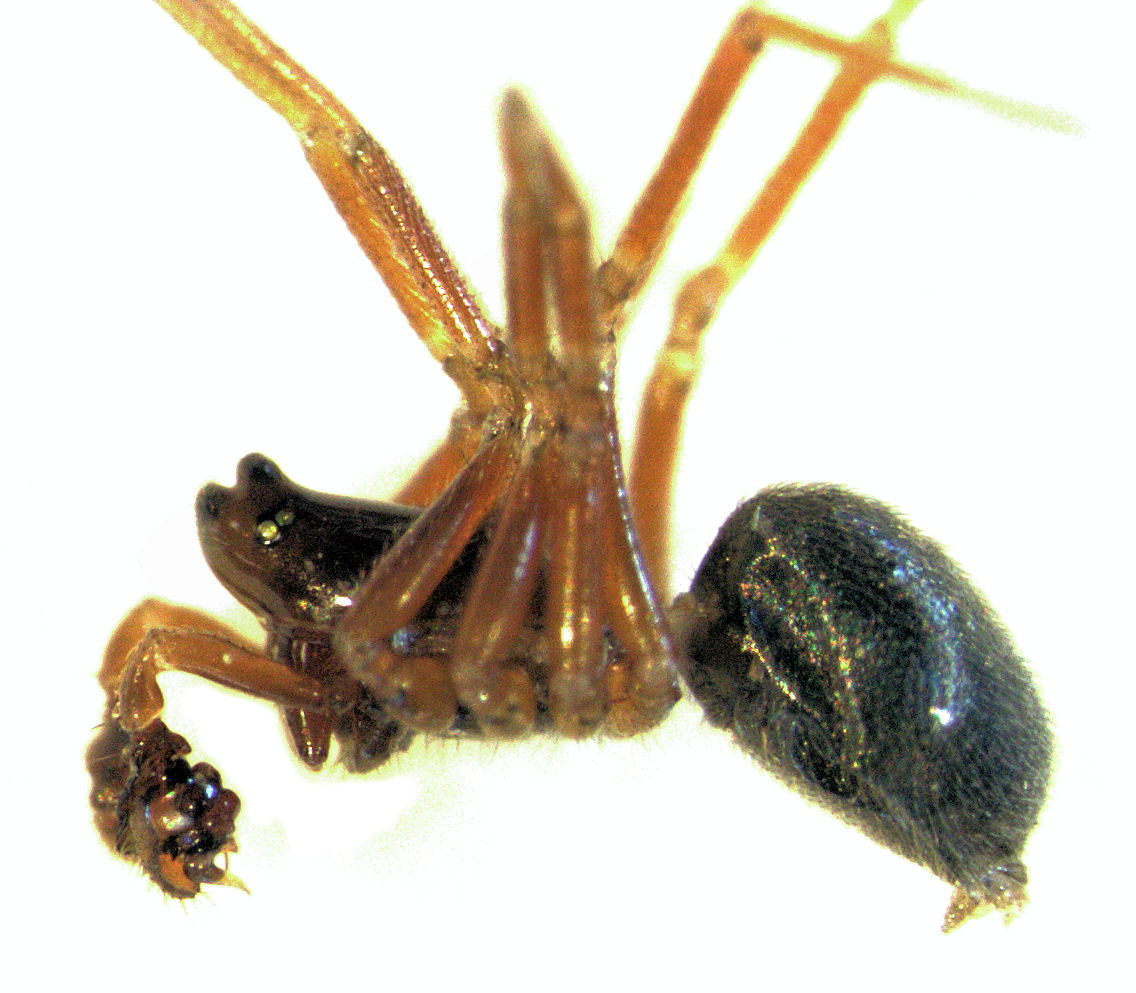
- D. cristatus

Scientific classification
- Domain: Eukaryota
- Kingdom: Animalia
- Phylum: Arthropoda
- Subphylum: Chelicerata
- Class: Arachnida
- Order: Araneae
- Infraorder: Araneomorphae
- Family: Linyphiidae
- Genus: Diplocephalus; Bertkau, 1883

Species
- 50, see text

Synonyms
- Chocorua; Plaesiocraerus; Streptosphaenus

= Diplocephalus =

Genus of spiders

Diplocephalus is a genus of sheet weavers first described by Philipp Bertkau in 1883.

== Species ==
As of May 2021, it contains 49 widely distributed species and one subspecies.

- Diplocephalus algericus Bosmans, 1996
- Diplocephalus alpinus (O. Pickard-Cambridge, 1873)
- Diplocephalus altimontanus Deltshev, 1984
- Diplocephalus arnoi Isaia, 2005
- Diplocephalus arvernus Denis, 1948
- Diplocephalus barbiger (Roewer, 1955)
- Diplocephalus bicephalus (Simon, 1884)
- Diplocephalus bicurvatus Bösenberg & Strand, 1906
- Diplocephalus bifurcatus Tanasevitch, 1989
- Diplocephalus caecus Denis, 1952
- Diplocephalus caucasicus Tanasevitch, 1987
- Diplocephalus connatus Bertkau, 1889
  - Diplocephalus c. jacksoni O. Pickard-Cambridge, 1904
- Diplocephalus crassilobus (Simon, 1884)
- Diplocephalus cristatus (Blackwall, 1833)
- Diplocephalus culminicola Simon, 1884
- Diplocephalus dentatus Tullgren, 1955
- Diplocephalus graecus (O. Pickard-Cambridge, 1873)
- Diplocephalus gravidus Strand, 1906
- Diplocephalus guidoi Frick & Isaia, 2012
- Diplocephalus helleri (L. Koch, 1869)
- Diplocephalus hispidulus Saito & Ono, 2001
- Diplocephalus hungaricus Kulczyński, 1915
- Diplocephalus inanis Tanasevitch, 2014
- Diplocephalus komposchi Milasowszky, Bauder & Hepner, 2017
- Diplocephalus lancearius (Simon, 1884)
- Diplocephalus latifrons (O. Pickard-Cambridge, 1863)
- Diplocephalus longicarpus (Simon, 1884)
- Diplocephalus lusiscus (Simon, 1872)
- Diplocephalus machadoi Bosmans & Cardoso, 2010
- Diplocephalus marijae Bosmans, 2010
- Diplocephalus marusiki Eskov, 1988
- Diplocephalus mirabilis Eskov, 1988
- Diplocephalus montaneus Tanasevitch, 1992
- Diplocephalus montanus Eskov, 1988
- Diplocephalus mystacinus (Simon, 1884)
- Diplocephalus parentalis Song & Li, 2010
- Diplocephalus pavesii Pesarini, 1996
- Diplocephalus permixtus (O. Pickard-Cambridge, 1871)
- Diplocephalus picinus (Blackwall, 1841)
- Diplocephalus procer (Simon, 1884)
- Diplocephalus protuberans (O. Pickard-Cambridge, 1875)
- Diplocephalus pseudocrassilobus Gnelitsa, 2006
- Diplocephalus pullinus Simon, 1918
- Diplocephalus rostratus Schenkel, 1934
- Diplocephalus sphagnicola Eskov, 1988
- Diplocephalus subrostratus (O. Pickard-Cambridge, 1873)
- Diplocephalus tiberinus (Caporiacco, 1936)
- Diplocephalus toscanaensis Wunderlich, 2011
- Diplocephalus transcaucasicus Tanasevitch, 1990
- Diplocephalus turcicus Brignoli, 1972
- Diplocephalus uliginosus Eskov, 1988
