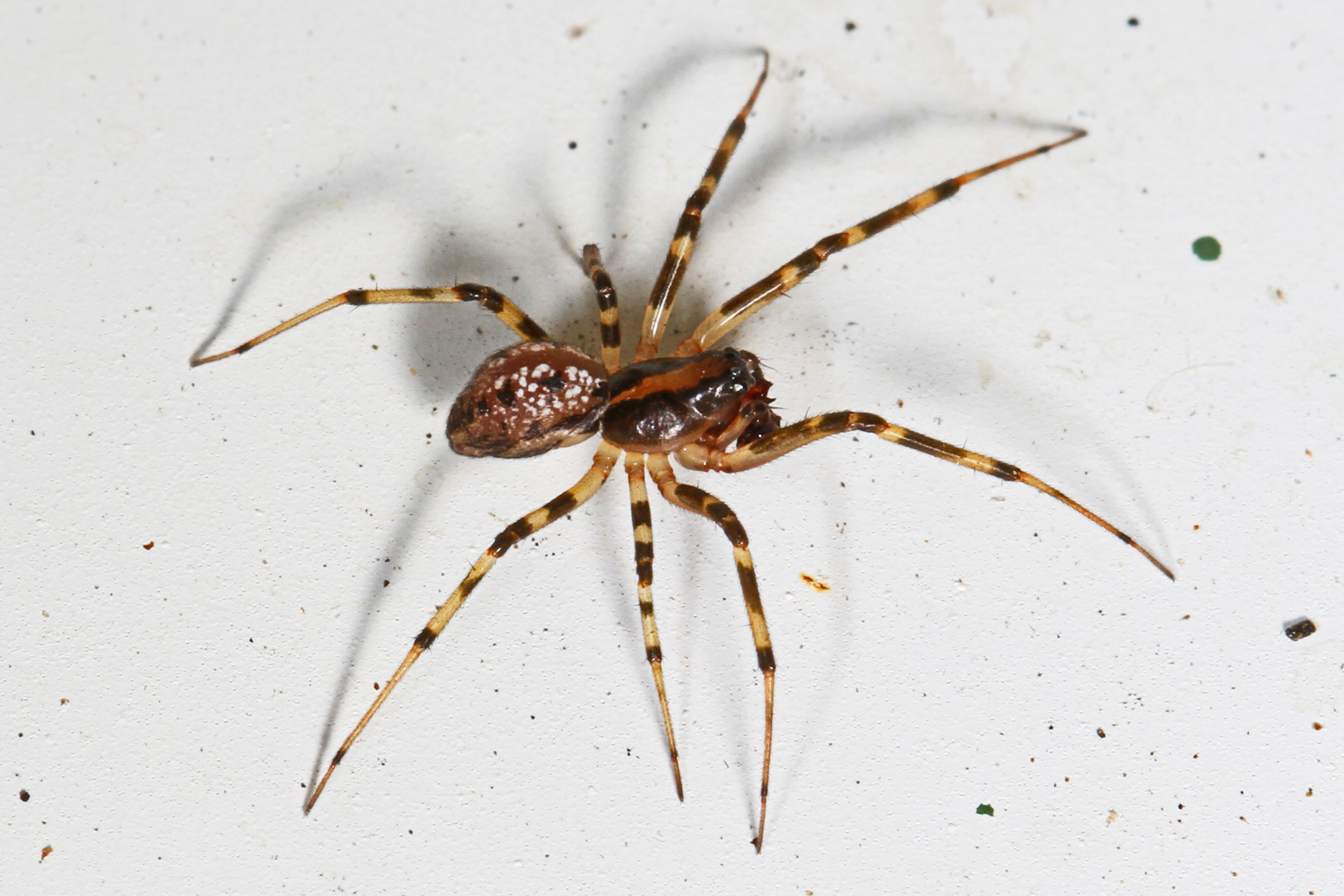

Scientific classification
- Domain: Eukaryota
- Kingdom: Animalia
- Phylum: Arthropoda
- Subphylum: Chelicerata
- Class: Arachnida
- Order: Araneae
- Infraorder: Araneomorphae
- Family: Linyphiidae
- Genus: Tapinopa
- Species: T. bilineata

Binomial name
- Tapinopa bilineata Banks, 1893

= Tapinopa bilineata =

Species of spider

Tapinopa bilineata is a species of sheetweb spider in the family Linyphiidae. It is found in the United States.
