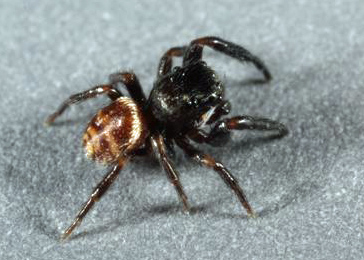

Scientific classification
- Kingdom: Animalia
- Phylum: Arthropoda
- Subphylum: Chelicerata
- Class: Arachnida
- Order: Araneae
- Infraorder: Araneomorphae
- Family: Salticidae
- Genus: Chalcoscirtus
- Species: C. diminutus

Binomial name
- Chalcoscirtus diminutus (Banks, 1896)

= Chalcoscirtus diminutus =

Species of spider

Chalcoscirtus diminutus is a species of jumping spider in the family Salticidae. It is found in the United States.

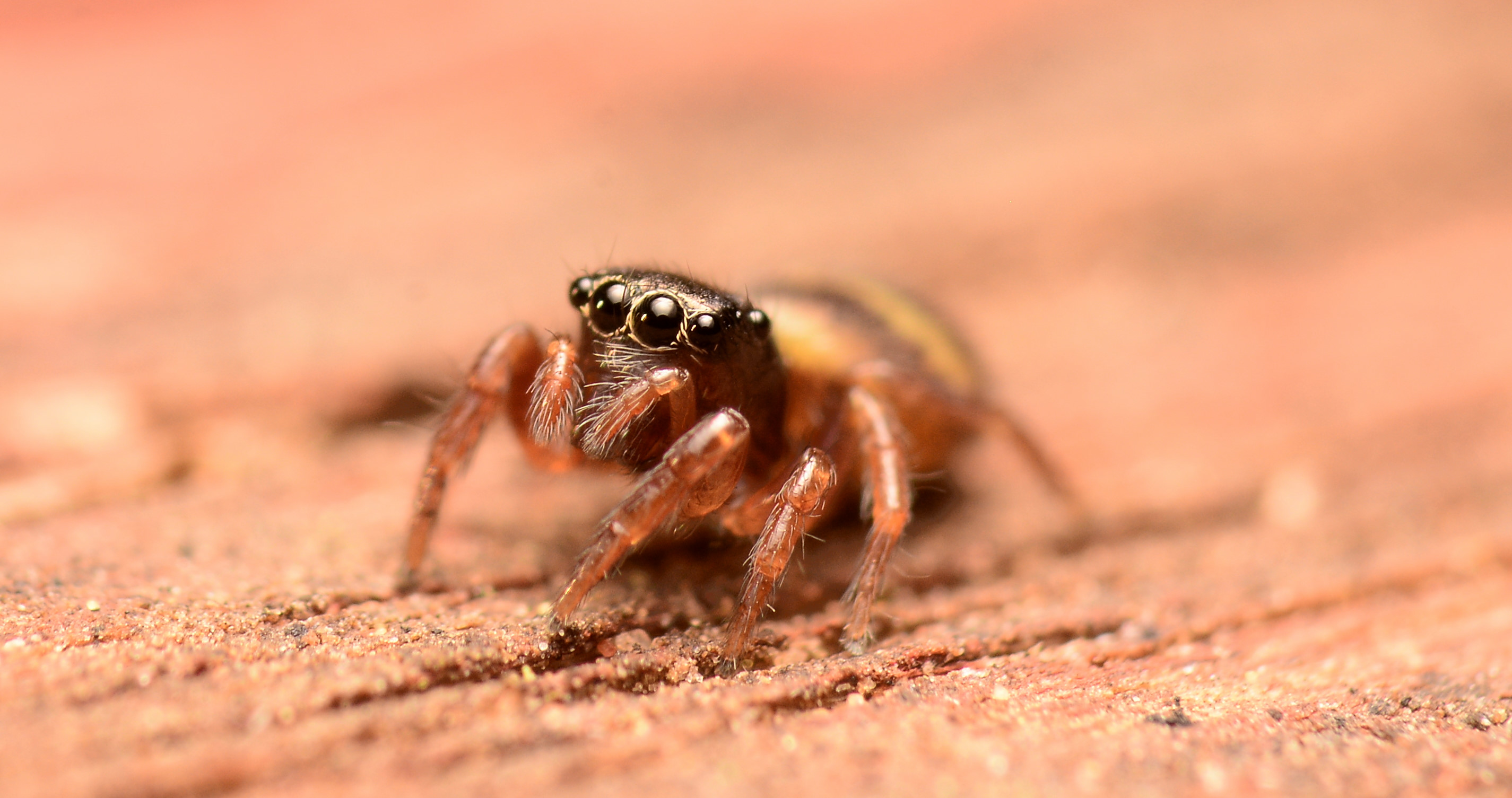
Female face

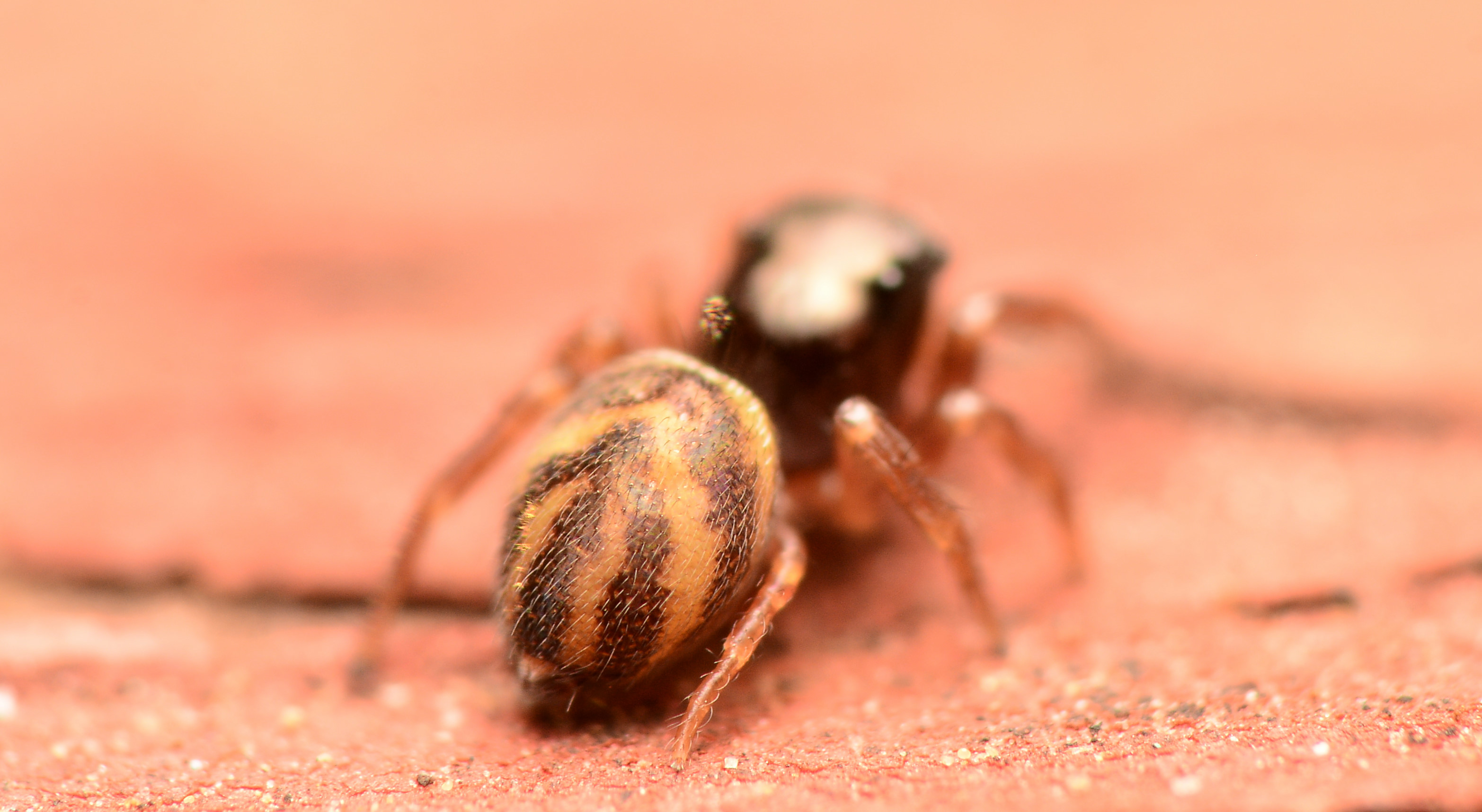
Female dorsal

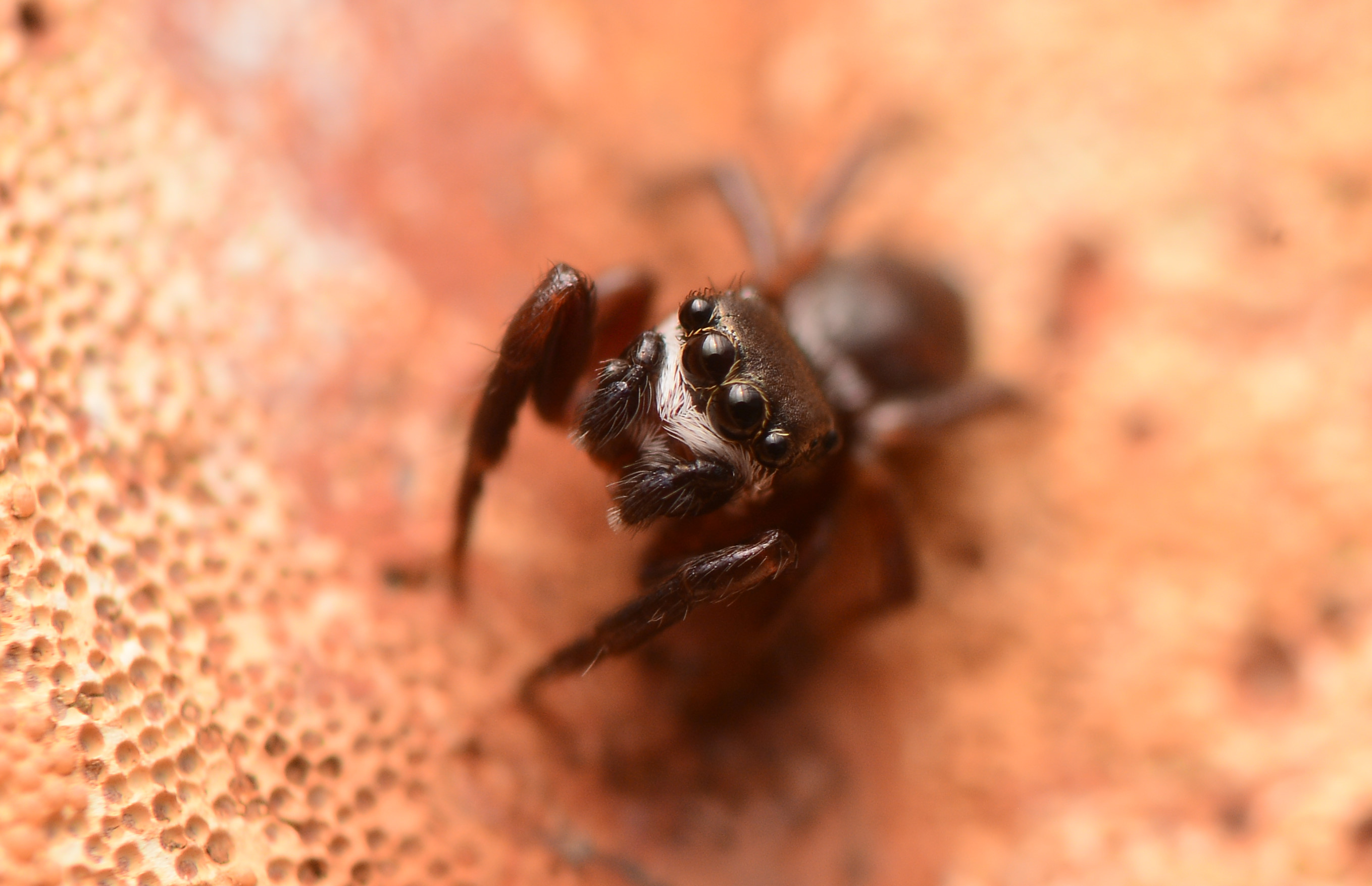
Male face

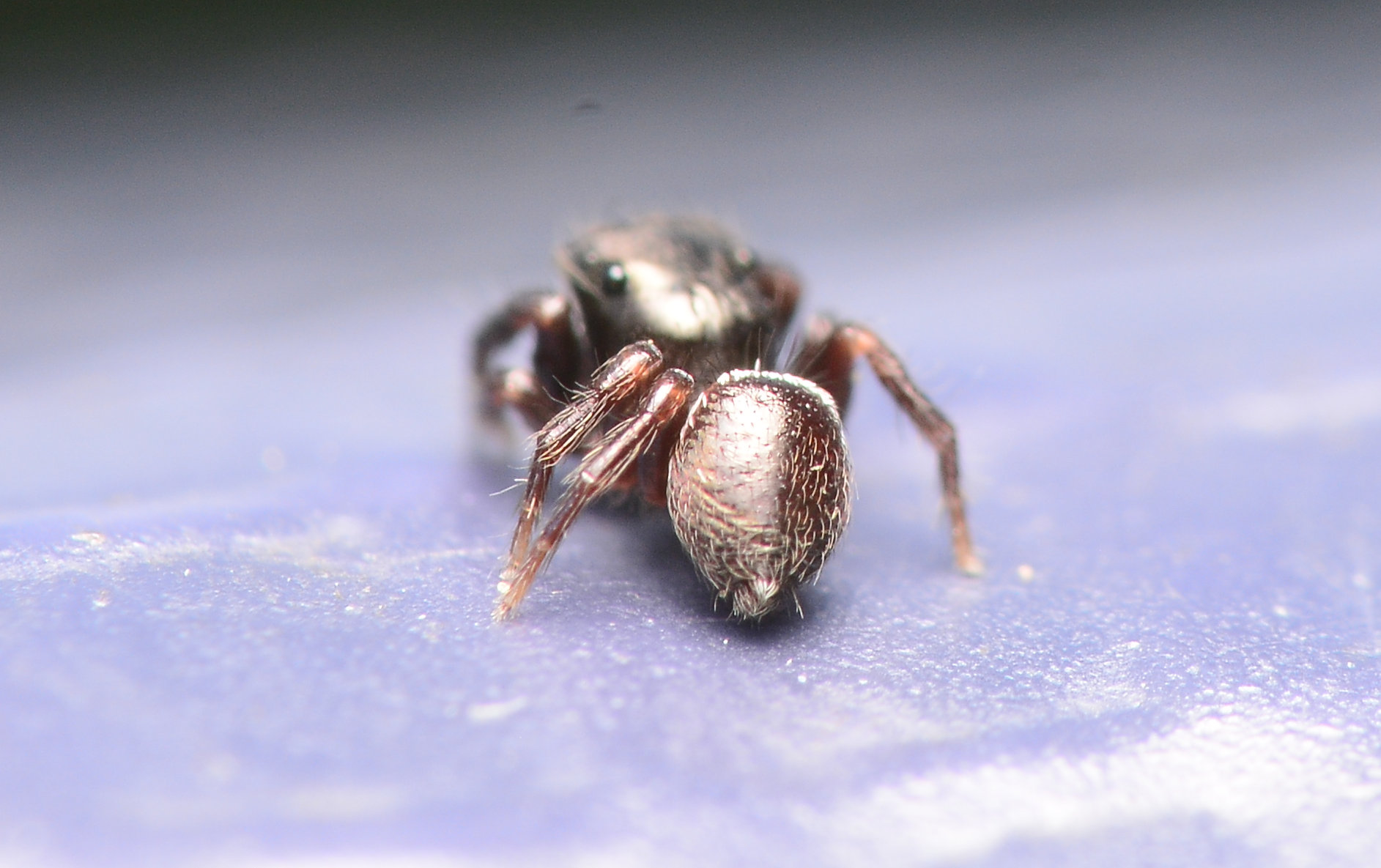
Male dorsal

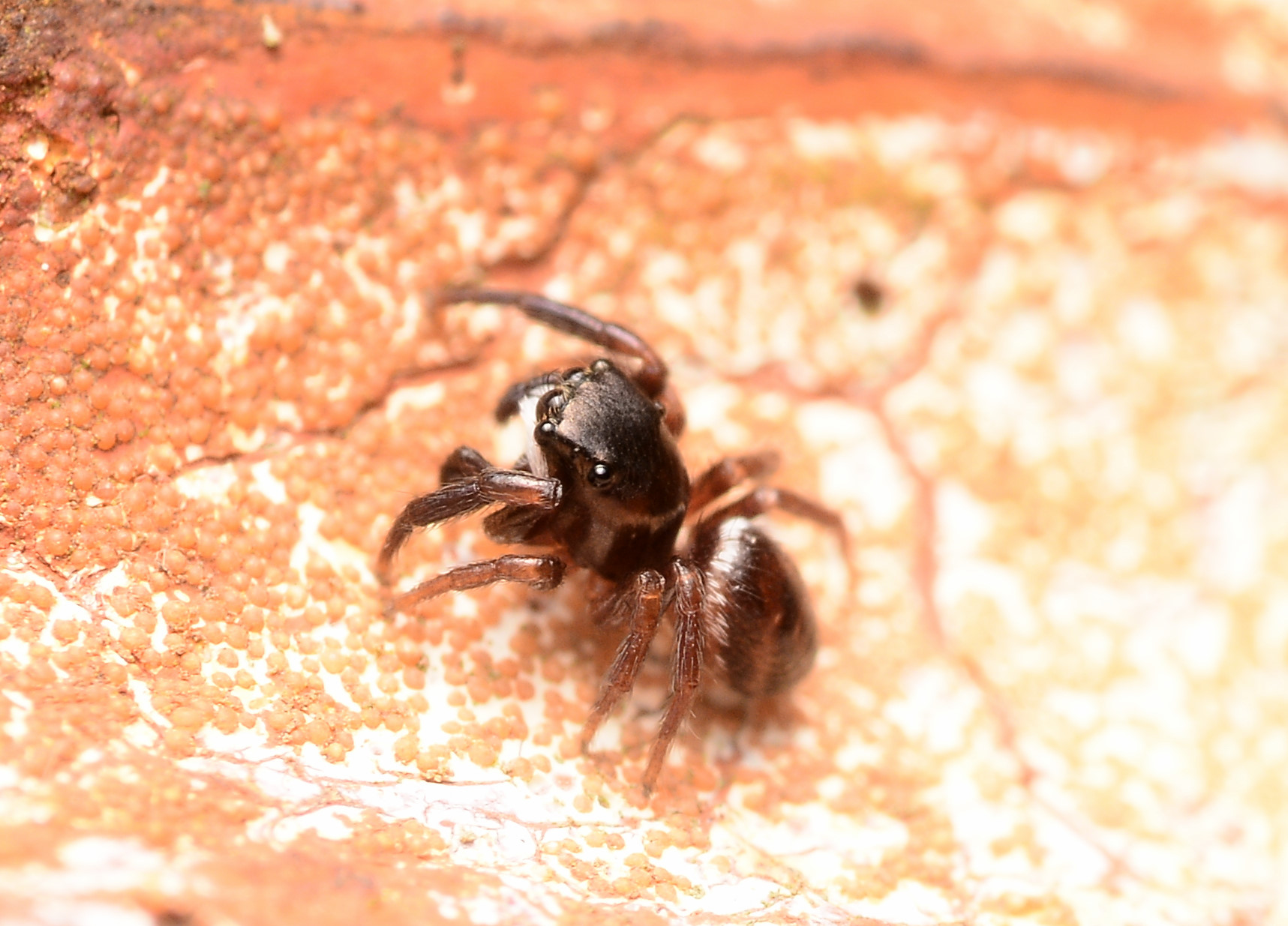
Male side
