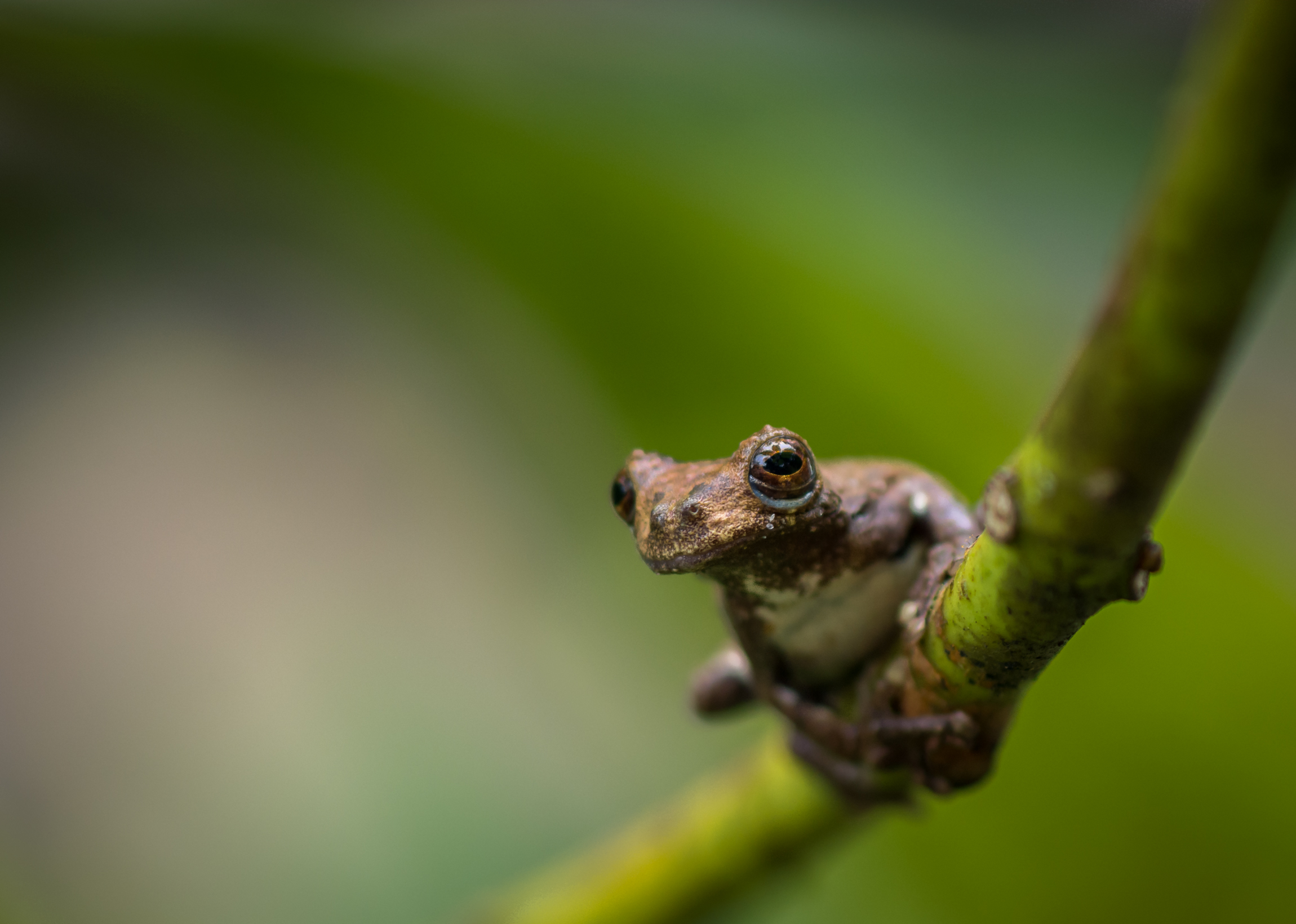

Conservation status
- Least Concern (IUCN 3.1)

Scientific classification
- Kingdom: Animalia
- Phylum: Chordata
- Class: Amphibia
- Order: Anura
- Family: Hylidae
- Genus: Dendropsophus
- Species: D. marmoratus

Binomial name
- Dendropsophus marmoratus (Laurenti, 1768)

= Dendropsophus marmoratus =

Species of frog

Dendropsophus marmoratus (the marmorea frog or South American bird poop frog) is a species of frog in the family Hylidae. It is found in the Amazon rainforest and montane forests in the eastern piedmont in Bolivia, Brazil, Colombia, Ecuador (Morona Santiago, Napo, Orellana, Pastaza, and Sucumbíos provinces), French Guiana, Guyana, Peru, Suriname, and Venezuela. Its natural habitats are subtropical or tropical moist lowland forests, intermittent freshwater marshes, and heavily degraded former forest. The species is threatened by habitat loss.

== Identification ==
Dendropsophus marmoratus is a medium-sized frog. The snout–vent length in males averages 35.8 mm with a range of 29.8–41.5 mm, and in females the average is 47.7 mm with a range of 46.5–49.7 mm.

According to Duellman, the snout is round in dorsal and profile view. Eardrums are present. The outer finger of the hand has a membrane to the base of the disc; the other manual fingers have membranes along about 2/3 of their length. The toes also have membranes at the base of the discs. Males in reproduction lack cornified nuptial excrescences. Scalloped skin folds are present on the outer edges of the feet, forearms and hands. The skin on the back is weakly tuberculated and that of the belly is granular.

The back varies from greyish-bronze to greenish-bronze and has a black, dark brown, or reddish mottle that generally includes dorsolaterally olive-green areas. In most individuals, there are pairs of large brown or reddish scapular marks. The armpit, groin, and posterior surface of the thighs are yellow-orange with black spots or mottled on the thighs. The anterior surfaces of the thighs are pale yellow-green with black dots. The chin and belly are white or light yellow with black dots; the ventral surfaces of the limbs are dark gray to black. The membranes are orange distally and black proximally. The iris is pale gray with fine black crosslinks. None of the species near Dendropsophus marmoratus has this pattern of coloration, which makes it clearly distinguishable from other sympatric species.

== Habitat and distribution ==
Dendropsophus marmoratus is an arboreal inhabitant of the forest, but individuals migrate to breeding sites in open areas. About two-thirds of the individuals registered in Santa Cecilia (Sucumbíos Province, Ecuador) were near temporary pools and ditches filled with water in clearings near the forest. A minority were in tree branches in secondary forest and primary forest. On Lago Agrio, frogs were recorded on tree branches felled in primary forest. Many of the frogs had been at heights of more than 20 m. In Yasuni National Park, Ron recorded it in open areas and Read (notes from the field) found choirs of Dendropsophus marmoratusin recently created temporary pools along roads in primary and secondary forest; It was especially common in large clearings within primary forest, such as oil well platforms, where water was present. Scinax ruber males also sing in their choirs.

D. marmoratus is found at altitudes of 0–1000 m above sea level in the Amazon Basin in Bolivia, Brazil, Colombia, Ecuador, French Guiana, Guyana, Peru, Suriname, and southern Venezuela.

== Taxonomy ==
"Marmoratus" in Latin means "marble," perhaps referring to the dorsal coloring pattern.

The species is part of the Dendropsophus marmoratus group. The group has eight species of which only Dendropsophus marmoratus is in Ecuador. The phylogeny presented by Wiens et al. supports the monophyly of the group but its analysis and Faivovich's analysis only included two species. Faivovich et al. suggested synapomorphy (the presence of tuberculated skin on the margin of the lower lip) as a possible character shared by the group.

== Behavior ==
Beetles and orthoptera are the most abundant prey; Menéndez-Guerrero reports that the diet has a high frequency of ants and attributes this fact to its short jaws and thin head compared to other species. Lee and Crump demonstrate selection of partners in relation to size since males in bridal embrace (amplexus) were on average larger than males who were not in amplexus.

== Use as pets ==
Among the exotic pet trade, Dendropsophus marmoratus specimens have become popular for their patterns, as many equate the frogs' mottled appearances to bird feces. The common name of "South American bird poop frog" stems from these observations.
