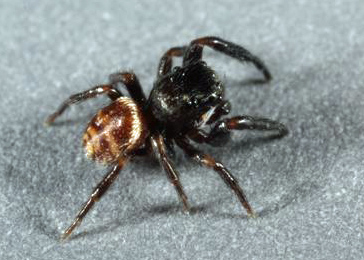
- Male Chalcoscirtus diminutus

Scientific classification
- Kingdom: Animalia
- Phylum: Arthropoda
- Subphylum: Chelicerata
- Class: Arachnida
- Order: Araneae
- Infraorder: Araneomorphae
- Family: Salticidae
- Subfamily: Salticinae
- Genus: Chalcoscirtus; Bertkau, 1880

Type species
- C. infimus (Simon, 1868)

Species
- 45, see text

= Chalcoscirtus =

Genus of spiders

Chalcoscirtus is a genus of jumping spiders that was first described by Philipp Bertkau in 1880. The name is derived from the Ancient Greek chalc-, meaning "copper", and scirt-, meaning "leap".

== timeline ==
As of June 2019 it contains forty-five species and one subspecies, found in Asia, Europe, North America, and Egypt:

- Chalcoscirtus alpicola (L. Koch, 1876) – North America, Central and Eastern Europe, Russia (European to Far East)
- Chalcoscirtus ansobicus Andreeva, 1976 – Tajikistan
- Chalcoscirtus atratus (Thorell, 1875) – Europe
- Chalcoscirtus bortolgois Logunov & Marusik, 1999 – Mongolia
- Chalcoscirtus brevicymbialis Wunderlust 1980 – Germany, Austria to Kazakhstan
- Chalcoscirtus carbonarius Emerton, 1917 – USA, Canada, Russia
- Chalcoscirtus catherinae Prószyński, 2000 – Egypt, Israel, Turkey
- Chalcoscirtus charynensis Logunov & Marusik, 1999 – Kazakhstan
- Chalcoscirtus diminutus (Banks, 1896) – USA
- Chalcoscirtus flavipes Caporiacco, 1935 – Tajikistan, Karakorum
- Chalcoscirtus fulvus Saito, 1939 – Japan
- Chalcoscirtus glacialis Caporiacco, 1935 – USA (Alaska), Russia (Siberia), Kazakhstan, Mongolia
  - Chalcoscirtus g. sibiricus Marusik, 1991 – Russia
- Chalcoscirtus grishkanae Marusik, 1988 – Russia (Siberia)
- Chalcoscirtus hosseinieorum Logunov, Marusik & Mozaffarian, 2002 – Iran
- Chalcoscirtus hyperboreus Marusik, 1991 – Russia
- Chalcoscirtus infimus (Simon, 1868) (type) – Southern, Central Europe to Central Asia
- Chalcoscirtus iranicus Logunov & Marusik, 1999 – Iran
- Chalcoscirtus janetscheki (Denis, 1957) – Spain
- Chalcoscirtus jerusalemicus Prószyński, 2000 – Israel
- Chalcoscirtus kamchik Marusik, 1991 – Uzbekistan
- Chalcoscirtus karakurt Marusik, 1991 – Central Asia, Iran
- Chalcoscirtus kirghisicus Marusik, 1991 – Kyrgyzstan
- Chalcoscirtus koponeni Logunov & Marusik, 1999 – Russia
- Chalcoscirtus lepidus Wesolowska, 1996 – Central Asia, Iran
- Chalcoscirtus lii Lei & Peng, 2010 – China
- Chalcoscirtus martensi Zabka, 1980 – Central Asia, Nepal, India, China
- Chalcoscirtus michailovi Logunov & Marusik, 1999 – Kazakhstan
- Chalcoscirtus minutus Marusik, 1990 – Tajikistan
- Chalcoscirtus molo Marusik, 1991 – Kyrgyzstan
- Chalcoscirtus nenilini Marusik, 1990 – Kyrgyzstan
- Chalcoscirtus nigritus (Thorell, 1875) – Europe, Turkey, Caucasus, Russia to Central Asia, China
- Chalcoscirtus paraansobicus Marusik, 1990 – Russia, Central Asia
- Chalcoscirtus parvulus Marusik, 1991 – Greece to Central Asia
- Chalcoscirtus picinus Wesolowska & van Harten, 2011 – United Arab Emirates
- Chalcoscirtus platnicki Marusik, 1995 – Kazakhstan
- Chalcoscirtus pseudoinfimus Ovtsharenko, 1978 – Georgia
- Chalcoscirtus rehobothicus (Strand, 1915) – Israel
- Chalcoscirtus sinevi Marusik, Fomichev & Vahtera, 2018 – Russia (South Siberia)
- Chalcoscirtus sublestus (Blackwall, 1867) – Madeira
- Chalcoscirtus talturaensis Logunov & Marusik, 2000 – Russia
- Chalcoscirtus tanasevichi Marusik, 1991 – Turkey, Caucasus, Russia (Europe to West Siberia), Kazakhstan, Central Asia
- Chalcoscirtus tanyae Logunov & Marusik, 1999 – Russia
- Chalcoscirtus vietnamensis Zabka, 1985 – Vietnam
- Chalcoscirtus yinae Lei & Peng, 2010 – China
- Chalcoscirtus zyuzini Marusik, 1991 – Central Asia
