= Philipp Bertkau =

German zoologist (1849–1894)

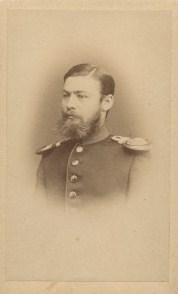
Philipp Bertkau

Philipp Bertkau (11 January 1849 – 22 October 1894) was a German zoologist born in Cologne.

He studied natural sciences at the University of Bonn, where in 1872 he earned his doctorate. In 1873, he became an assistant at the botanical institute in Munich, and during the following spring was an assistant at the zoological institute at Bonn. In 1882 he was appointed professor at the Agricultural Academy of Poppelsdorf, and in 1890 became curator at the Institute of Zoology and Comparative Anatomy.

Bertkau is remembered for his work involving the anatomy and physiology of spiders, research on sense of smell in butterflies, and anatomical studies of hermaphroditic arthropods. At Bonn he was secretary of Bonner Gesellschaft für Naturgeschichte (Bonn Society of Natural History).

He is the taxonomic authority of the families Anyphaenidae, Hahniidae, Sparassidae and Zoropsidae, and of the genera Ancylometes, Chalcoscirtus, Comaroma and Diplocephalus.

== Selected works ==
- Über die Respirationsorgane der Araneen, 1872 (dissertation) - On the respiratory organs of Araneae.
- Arachniden, 1880 - On arachnids.
- Verzeichniss der von Prof. E. van Beneden auf seiner im Auftrage der belgischen Regierung unternommenen wissenschaftlichen Reise nach Brasilien und La Plata in Jahren 1872-5 gesammelten Arachniden, 1880 - Directory of Edouard Van Beneden on behalf of the Belgian government involving scientific travel to Brazil and La Plata in 1872–1875 (collecting arachnids).
- Ueber das Cribellum und Calamistrum. Ein Beitrag zur Histiologie, Biologie und Systematik der Spinnen. Arch. f. Naturgesch. 1882. 48. 1. 316-362. pl. 18. - On the cribellum and calamistrum. A contribution involving the histology, biology and systematics of spiders.
- "Various pamphlets on arachnida", 1889-1890 (published in English).
