= List of Hahniidae species =

This page lists all described species of the spider family Hahniidae accepted by the World Spider Catalog as of February 2021:

== A ==
=== Alistra ===
Alistra Thorell, 1894

- A. annulata Zhang, Li & Zheng, 2011 — China
- A. astrolomae (Hickman, 1948) — Australia (Tasmania)
- A. berlandi (Marples, 1955) — Samoa
- A. centralis (Forster, 1970) — New Zealand
- A. hamata Zhang, Li & Pham, 2013 — Vietnam
- A. hippocampa Zhang, Li & Zheng, 2011 — China
- A. inanga (Forster, 1970) — New Zealand
- A. longicauda Thorell, 1894 (type) — Indonesia (Sumatra)
- A. mangareia (Forster, 1970) — New Zealand
- A. mendanai Brignoli, 1986 — Solomon Is., Réunion
- A. myops (Simon, 1898) — Philippines
- A. napua (Forster, 1970) — New Zealand
- A. opina (Forster, 1970) — New Zealand
- A. personata Ledoux, 2004 — Réunion
- A. pusilla (Rainbow, 1920) — Australia (Lord Howe Is.)
- A. radleyi (Simon, 1898) — Sri Lanka
- A. reinga (Forster, 1970) — New Zealand
- A. stenura (Simon, 1898) — Sri Lanka
- A. sulawesensis Bosmans, 1992 — Indonesia (Sulawesi)
- A. taprobanica (Simon, 1898) — Sri Lanka
- A. tuna (Forster, 1970) — New Zealand

=== Amaloxenops ===
Amaloxenops Schiapelli & Gerschman, 1958

- A. palmarum (Schiapelli & Gerschman, 1958) — Argentina
- A. vianai Schiapelli & Gerschman, 1958 (type) — Argentina

=== Antistea ===
Antistea

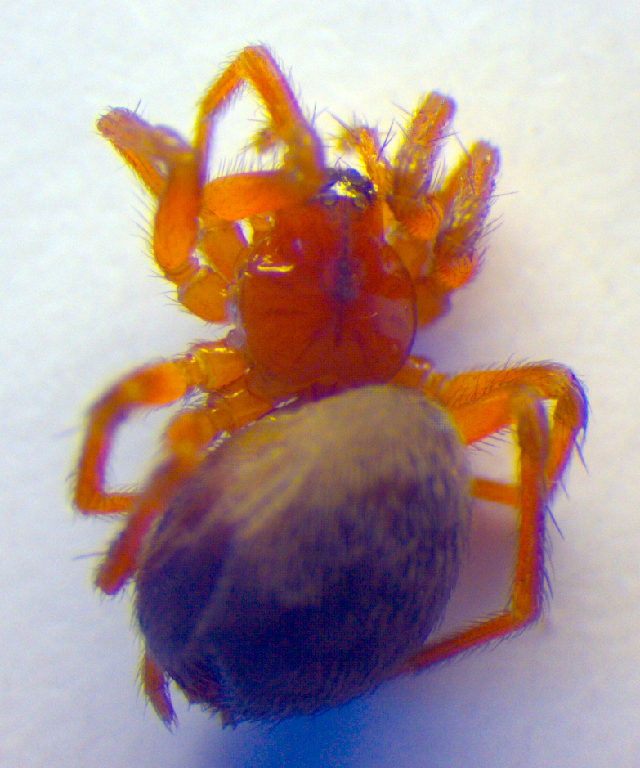
Marsh combtail
(Antistea elegans)

Antistea Simon, 1898

- A. brunnea (Emerton, 1909) — USA, Canada
- A. elegans (Blackwall, 1841) (type) — Europe, Turkey, Russia (Europe to South Siberia), Japan

=== Asiohahnia ===
Asiohahnia Ovtchinnikov, 1992

- A. alatavica Ovtchinnikov, 1992 (type) — Kazakhstan, Kyrgyzstan
- A. dzhungarica Ovtchinnikov, 1992 — Kazakhstan
- A. ketmenica Ovtchinnikov, 1992 — Kazakhstan
- A. liangdangensis (Tang, Yang & Kim, 1996) — China
- A. longipes Ovtchinnikov, 1992 — Kyrgyzstan
- A. reniformis (Chen, Yan & Yin, 2009) — China
- A. spinulata Ovtchinnikov, 1992 — Kyrgyzstan
- A. xinjiangensis (Wang & Liang, 1989) — China

=== Austrohahnia ===
Austrohahnia Mello-Leitão, 1942

- A. catleyi Rubio, Lo-Man-Hung & Iuri, 2014 — Argentina
- A. melloleitaoi (Schiapelli & Gerschman, 1942) — Argentina
- A. praestans Mello-Leitão, 1942 (type) — Argentina

== C ==
=== Cybaeolus ===
Cybaeolus Simon, 1884

- C. delfini (Simon, 1904) — Chile
- C. pusillus Simon, 1884 (type) — Chile, Argentina
- C. rastellus (Roth, 1967) — Chile

=== † Cymbiohahnia ===
† Cymbiohahnia Wunderlich, 2004

- † C. parens Wunderlich, 2004

== E ==
=== † Eohahnia ===
† Eohahnia Petrunkevitch, 1958

- † E. succini Petrunkevitch, 1958

== H ==
=== Hahnia ===
Hahnia

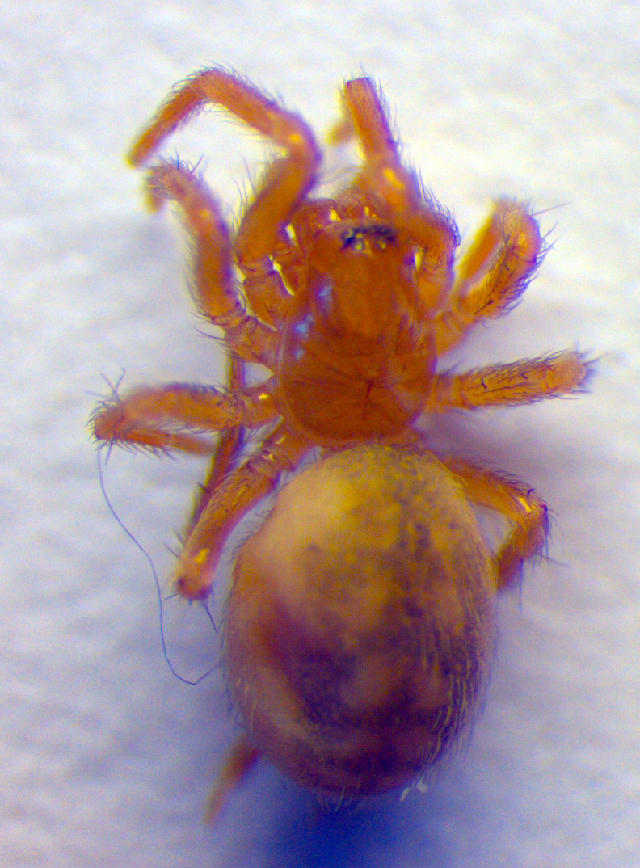
Hahnia helveola

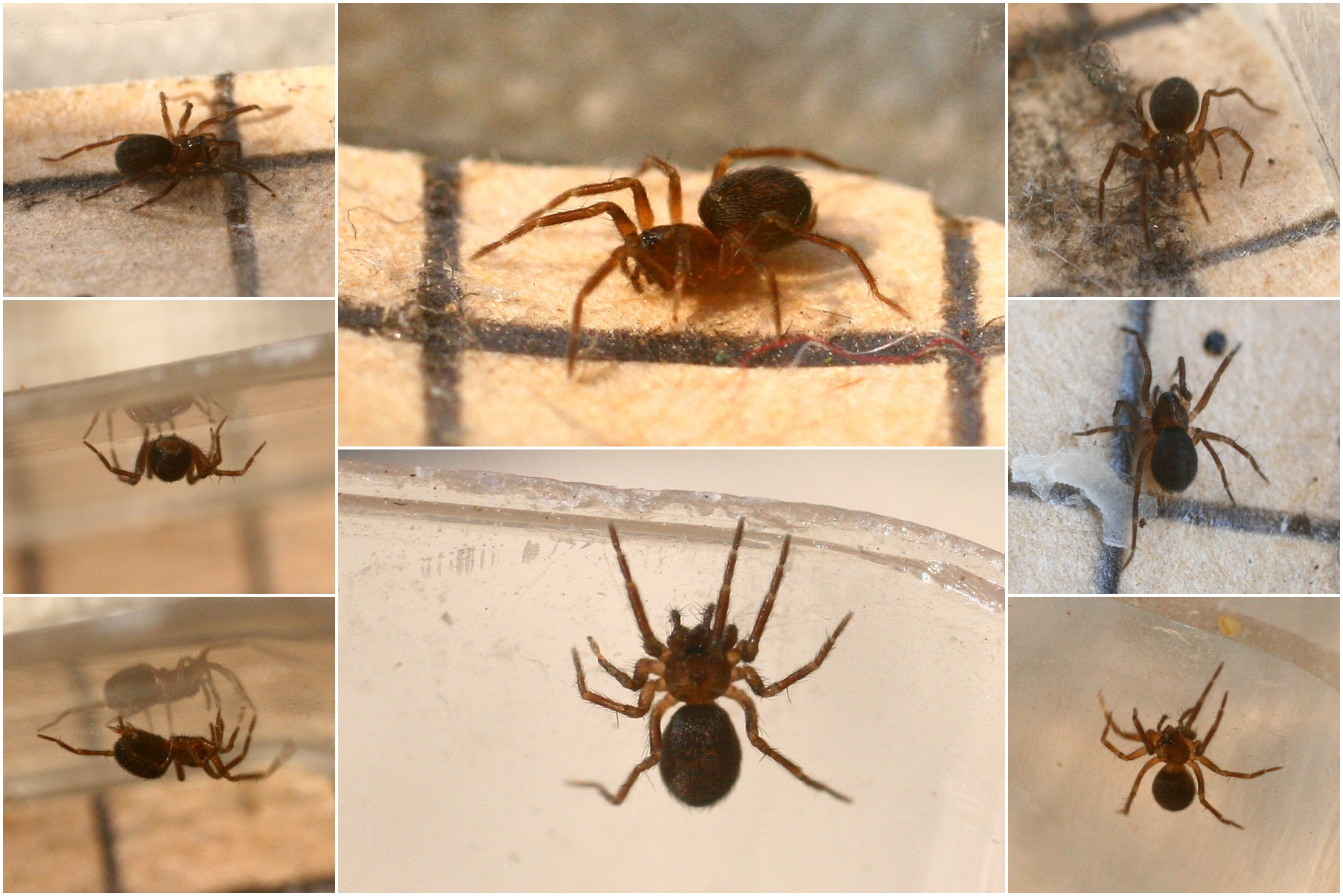
Hahnia montana

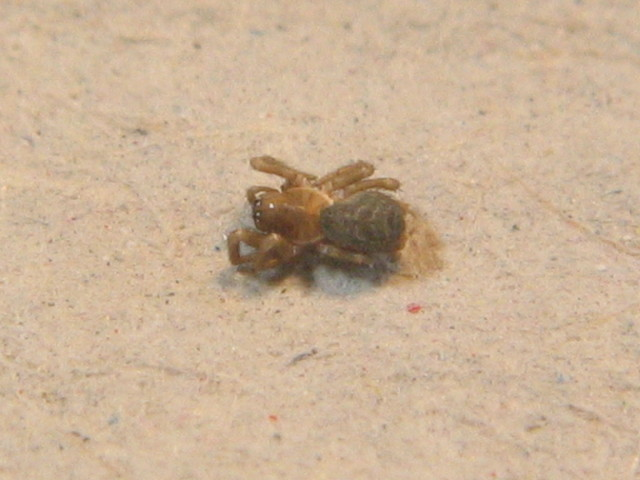
Hahnia pusilla

Hahnia C. L. Koch, 1841

- H. abrahami (Hewitt, 1915) — South Africa
- H. alini Tikader, 1964 — Nepal
- H. arizonica Chamberlin & Ivie, 1942 — USA
- H. banksi Fage, 1938 — Costa Rica, Panama
- H. barbara Denis, 1937 — Algeria
- H. barbata Bosmans, 1992 — Indonesia (Sulawesi)
- H. benoiti Bosmans & Thijs, 1980 — Kenya
- H. biapophysis Huang & Zhang, 2017 — China
- H. breviducta Bosmans & Thijs, 1980 — Kenya
- H. caeca (Georgescu & Sarbu, 1992) — Romania
- H. caelebs Brignoli, 1978 — Bhutan
- H. cameroonensis Bosmans, 1987 — Cameroon
- H. cervicornata Wang & Zhang, 1986 — China
- H. chaoyangensis Zhu & Zhu, 1983 — China
- H. cinerea Emerton, 1890 — North America
- H. clathrata Simon, 1898 — South Africa
- H. corticicola Bösenberg & Strand, 1906 — Russia (East Siberia, Far East), China, Korea, Taiwan, Japan
- H. crozetensis Hickman, 1939 — Crozet Is.
- H. deiocesi Zamani & Marusik, 2021 — Iran
- H. dewittei Bosmans, 1986 — Congo
- H. dongi Huang & Zhang, 2017 — China
- H. eburneensis Jocqué & Bosmans, 1982 — Ivory Coast
- H. eidmanni (Roewer, 1942) — Equatorial Guinea (Bioko)
- H. falcata Wang, 1989 — China
- H. flaviceps Emerton, 1913 — USA
- H. gigantea Bosmans, 1986 — Central Africa
- H. glacialis Sørensen, 1898 — Russia (East Siberia, Far East), Canada, USA, Greenland
- H. harmae Brignoli, 1977 — Tunisia
- H. hauseri Brignoli, 1978 — Spain (Balearic Is.)
- H. helveola Simon, 1875 — Europe, Turkey
- H. heterophthalma Simon, 1905 — Argentina
- H. himalayaensis Hu & Zhang, 1990 — China, Vietnam
- H. implexa Seo, 2017 — Korea
- H. inflata Benoit, 1978 — Kenya
- H. innupta Brignoli, 1978 — Bhutan
- H. insulana Schenkel, 1938 — Madeira
- H. jocquei Bosmans, 1982 — Malawi
- H. laodiana Song, 1990 — China
- H. larseni Marusik, 2017 — South Africa
- H. laticeps Simon, 1898 — South Africa
- H. lehtineni Brignoli, 1978 — Bhutan
- H. leopoldi Bosmans, 1982 — Cameroon
- H. linderi Wunderlich, 1992 — Canary Is.
- H. lobata Bosmans, 1981 — South Africa
- H. maginii Brignoli, 1977 — Italy
- H. major Benoit, 1978 — Kenya
- H. manengoubensis Bosmans, 1987 — Cameroon
- H. martialis Bösenberg & Strand, 1906 — Japan
- H. mauensis Bosmans, 1986 — Kenya
- H. michaelseni Simon, 1902 — Chile, Argentina, Falkland Is.
- H. molossidis Brignoli, 1979 — Greece
- H. montana Seo, 2017 — Korea
- H. mridulae Tikader, 1970 — India
- H. musica Brignoli, 1978 — Bhutan, China
- H. naguaboi (Lehtinen, 1967) — Puerto Rico
- H. nava (Blackwall, 1841) — Europe, Russia (Europe to Far East), Turkey, Israel, Caucasus, Iran, Korea, Japan
- H. ngai Rivera-Quiroz, Petcharad & Miller, 2020 — Thailand
- H. nigricans Benoit, 1978 — Kenya
- H. nobilis Opell & Beatty, 1976 — Mexico
- H. obliquitibialis Bosmans, 1982 — Malawi
- H. okefinokensis Chamberlin & Ivie, 1934 — USA
- H. ononidum Simon, 1875 — USA, Canada, Europe, Turkey, Russia (Europe to Far East), Kazakhstan
- H. oreophila Simon, 1898 — Sri Lanka
- H. ovata Song & Zheng, 1982 — China
- H. petrobia Simon, 1875 — Spain, France, Italy, Germany
- H. pinicola Arita, 1978 — Japan
- H. pusilla C. L. Koch, 1841 (type) — Europe, Russia (Europe to South Siberia)
- H. pusio Simon, 1898 — Sri Lanka
- H. pyriformis Yin & Wang, 1984 — China
- H. quadriseta Galán-Sánchez & Álvarez-Padilla, 2017 — Mexico
- H. rimaformis Zhang, Li & Pham, 2013 — Vietnam
- H. rossii Brignoli, 1977 — Italy, Iran
- H. saccata Zhang, Li & Zheng, 2011 — China, Thailand
- H. sanjuanensis Exline, 1938 — USA, Mexico
- H. schubotzi Strand, 1913 — Central, East Africa
- H. sexoculata Ponomarev, 2009 — Russia (Caucasus)
- H. sibirica Marusik, Hippa & Koponen, 1996 — Russia (Europe to Far East), China
- H. simoni Mello-Leitão, 1919 — Brazil
- H. sirimoni Benoit, 1978 — Kenya
- H. spasskyi Denis, 1958 — Afghanistan
- H. spinata Benoit, 1978 — Kenya
- H. subcorticicola Liu, Huang & Zhang, 2015 — China
- H. submaginii Zhang, Li & Zheng, 2011 — China
- H. subsaccata Huang & Zhang, 2017 — China
- H. tabulicola Simon, 1898 — Africa
- H. tanikawai Suguro, 2015 — Japan
- H. tatei (Gertsch, 1934) — Venezuela
- H. thorntoni Brignoli, 1982 — China, Hong Kong, Laos, Japan
- H. thymorum Emerit & Ledoux, 2014 — France
- H. tikaderi Brignoli, 1978 — Bhutan
- H. tortuosa Song & Kim, 1991 — China
- H. tuybaana Barrion & Litsinger, 1995 — Philippines
- H. ulyxis Brignoli, 1974 — Greece
- H. upembaensis Bosmans, 1986 — Congo
- H. vangoethemi Benoit, 1978 — Kenya
- H. vanwaerebeki Bosmans, 1987 — Cameroon
- H. veracruzana Gertsch & Davis, 1940 — Mexico
- H. wangi Huang & Zhang, 2017 — China
- H. weiningensis Huang, Chen & Zhang, 2018 — China
- H. yakouensis Chen, Yan & Yin, 2009 — China
- H. zhejiangensis Song & Zheng, 1982 — China, Taiwan, Vietnam
- H. zhui Zhang & Chen, 2015 — China
- H. zodarioides (Simon, 1898) — South Africa

=== Hahniharmia ===
Hahniharmia Wunderlich, 2004

- H. picta (Kulczyński, 1897) (type) — Europe

=== Harmiella ===
Harmiella Brignoli, 1979

- H. schiapelliae Brignoli, 1979 (type) — Brazil

=== Hexamatia ===
Hexamatia Rivera-Quiroz, Petcharad & Miller, 2020

- H. seekhaow Rivera-Quiroz, Petcharad & Miller, 2020 (type) — Thailand
- H. senaria (Zhang, Li & Zheng, 2011) — China

== I ==
=== Iberina ===
Iberina Simon, 1881

- I. candida (Simon, 1875) — Europe, North Africa, Turkey, Israel
- I. difficilis (Harm, 1966) — France, Italy, Central Europe, Romania
- I. ljovuschkini Pichka, 1965 — Russia (Caucasus)
- I. mazarredoi Simon, 1881 (type) — Spain, France
- I. microphthalma (Snazell & Duffey, 1980) — Britain, Switzerland, Germany, Czechia, Hungary
- I. montana (Blackwall, 1841) — Europe, Turkey

=== Intihuatana ===
Intihuatana Lehtinen, 1967

- I. antarctica (Simon, 1902) (type) — Argentina

== K ==
=== Kapanga ===
Kapanga Forster, 1970

- K. alta Forster, 1970 — New Zealand
- K. festiva Forster, 1970 — New Zealand
- K. grana Forster, 1970 — New Zealand
- K. hickmani (Forster, 1964) — New Zealand (Auckland Is.)
- K. isulata (Forster, 1970) — New Zealand
- K. luana Forster, 1970 — New Zealand
- K. mana Forster, 1970 — New Zealand
- K. manga Forster, 1970 — New Zealand
- K. solitaria (Bryant, 1935) — New Zealand
- K. wiltoni Forster, 1970 (type) — New Zealand

== L ==
=== Lizarba ===
Lizarba Roth, 1967

- L. separata Roth, 1967 (type) — Brazil

== M ==
=== Mastigusa ===
Mastigusa Menge, 1854

- M. arietina (Thorell, 1871) — Europe, Iran
- M. lucifuga (Simon, 1898) — France
- M. macrophthalma (Kulczyński, 1897) — Hungary, Balkans, Caucasus?, Russia (Middle and South Siberia)?

== N ==
=== Neoantistea ===
Neoantistea Gertsch, 1934

- N. agilis (Keyserling, 1887) (type) — USA, Canada
- N. alachua Gertsch, 1946 — USA
- N. aspembira Galán-Sánchez & Álvarez-Padilla, 2017 — Mexico
- N. caporiaccoi Brignoli, 1976 — Kashmir
- N. coconino Chamberlin & Ivie, 1942 — USA
- N. crandalli Gertsch, 1946 — USA
- N. gosiuta Gertsch, 1934 — USA
- N. hidalgoensis Opell & Beatty, 1976 — Mexico
- N. inaffecta Opell & Beatty, 1976 — Mexico
- N. jacalana Gertsch, 1946 — Mexico
- N. janetscheki Brignoli, 1976 — Nepal
- N. kaisaisa Barrion & Litsinger, 1995 — Philippines
- N. lyrica Opell & Beatty, 1976 — Mexico to Costa Rica
- N. magna (Keyserling, 1887) — USA, Canada
- N. maxima (Caporiacco, 1935) — Kashmir
- N. mulaiki Gertsch, 1946 — USA, Mexico
- N. multidentata Galán-Sánchez & Álvarez-Padilla, 2017 — Mexico
- N. oklahomensis Opell & Beatty, 1976 — USA
- N. procteri Gertsch, 1946 — USA
- N. pueblensis Opell & Beatty, 1976 — Mexico
- N. quelpartensis Paik, 1958 — Russia (Far East), China, Korea, Japan
- N. riparia (Keyserling, 1887) — USA
- N. santana Chamberlin & Ivie, 1942 — USA
- N. spica Opell & Beatty, 1976 — Mexico
- N. unifistula Opell & Beatty, 1976 — Mexico

=== Neoaviola ===
Neoaviola Butler, 1929

- N. insolens Butler, 1929 (type) — Australia (Victoria)

=== Neohahnia ===
Neohahnia Mello-Leitão, 1917

- N. chibcha Heimer & Müller, 1988 — Colombia
- N. ernsti (Simon, 1898) — St. Vincent, Venezuela
- N. palmicola Mello-Leitão, 1917 — Brazil
- N. sylviae Mello-Leitão, 1917 (type) — Brazil

== P ==
=== Pacifantistea ===
Pacifantistea Marusik, 2011

- P. ovtchinnikovi Marusik, 2011 (type) — Russia, Japan

=== Porioides ===
Porioides Forster, 1989

- P. rima (Forster, 1970) (type) — New Zealand
- P. tasmani (Forster, 1970) — New Zealand

=== † Protohahnia ===
† Protohahnia Wunderlich, 2004

- † P. antiqua Wunderlich, 2004
- † P. tripartita Wunderlich, 2004

== R ==
=== Rinawa ===
Rinawa Forster, 1970

- R. bola Forster, 1970 — New Zealand
- R. cantuaria Forster, 1970 — New Zealand
- R. otagoensis Forster, 1970 (type) — New Zealand
- R. pula Forster, 1970 — New Zealand

== S ==
=== Scotospilus ===
Scotospilus Simon, 1886

- S. ampullarius (Hickman, 1948) — Australia (Tasmania)
- S. bicolor Simon, 1886 (type) — Australia (Tasmania)
- S. divisus (Forster, 1970) — New Zealand
- S. longus Zhang, Li & Pham, 2013 — Vietnam
- S. maindroni (Simon, 1906) — India
- S. nelsonensis (Forster, 1970) — New Zealand
- S. plenus (Forster, 1970) — New Zealand
- S. wellingtoni (Hickman, 1948) — Australia (Tasmania)
- S. westlandicus (Forster, 1970) — New Zealand
