= Alistra pikachu =

Scientific classification
- Kingdom: Animalia
- Phylum: Arthropoda
- Subphylum: Chelicerata
- Class: Arachnida
- Order: Araneae
- Infraorder: Araneomorphae
- Family: Hahniidae
- Genus: Alistra
- Species: A. pikachu

Binomial name
- Alistra pikachu Lin & Li, 2021

Species of spider

Alistra pikachu is a species of dwarf sheet spider found in China.

== Etymology ==
The species is named after Pikachu, a fictional character from Pokémon, as the general color of this species is yellow.

== Taxonomy and systematics ==
Males of A. pikachu are similar to those of A. hippocampa in having a slender embolus, short cymbial furrow, and an absence of the median apophysis and conductor, but they differ by the absence of patellar apophyses (present in A. hippocampa) and by having a long, thin retrolateral tibial apophysis (short in A. hippocampa). Females are distinguished from other Alistra species by the folded copulatory ducts and oval spermathecae.

== Description ==
The male holotype has a total length of 1.55 mm while males total length varies 1.45 to 1.62 mm. The prosoma is 0.71 mm long and 0.63 mm wide; the opisthosoma is 0.92 mm long and 0.63 mm wide. Leg formula is 4123. The palp has a patella without an apophysis. The palpal tibia is longer than the patella, and the retrolateral tibial apophysis is sickle-shaped. The embolus originates prolatero-basally, curves clockwise along the tegular margin, and is semicircular. The cymbium has a short, deep furrow one quarter the length of the cymbial length.

The female paratype has a total length of 1.84 mm while females' total length varies from 1.63 to 1.84 mm. The prosoma is 0.71 mm long and 0.72 mm wide; the opisthosoma is 1.12 mm long and 0.79 mm wide. Leg formula is 4123. The opisthosoma is yellow-brown. The epigyne is small and simple, with folded copulatory ducts and an oval spermathecae.

== Distribution and habitat ==
The species is known only from the type locality: Jile Cave, Gaofengdaoban, Yangshan County, Guangdong, China.
