= Neoaviola =

Scientific classification
- Domain: Eukaryota
- Kingdom: Animalia
- Phylum: Arthropoda
- Subphylum: Chelicerata
- Class: Arachnida
- Order: Araneae
- Infraorder: Araneomorphae
- Family: Hahniidae
- Genus: Neoaviola; Butler, 1929
- Species: N. insolens

Binomial name
- Neoaviola insolens Butler, 1929

Genus of spiders

Neoaviola is a monotypic genus of Australian dwarf sheet spiders containing the single species, Neoaviola insolens. It was first described by Arthur Gardiner Butler in 1929, and has only been found in Australia. It might be a synonym for Rinawa.
