= Hahnia abrahami =

Scientific classification
- Kingdom: Animalia
- Phylum: Arthropoda
- Subphylum: Chelicerata
- Class: Arachnida
- Order: Araneae
- Infraorder: Araneomorphae
- Family: Hahniidae
- Genus: Hahnia
- Species: H. abrahami

Binomial name
- Hahnia abrahami (Hewitt, 1915)

Synonyms
- Muizenbergia abrahami Hewitt, 1915

Species of spider

Hahnia abrahami is a species of spider in the family Hahniidae. It is endemic to South Africa and is commonly known as Abraham's comb-tailed spider.

== Distribution ==
Hahnia abrahami is endemic to the Western Cape province of South Africa. It is presently known only from three coastal localities, at elevations ranging from 6 to 198 m above sea level. The species occurs at Muizenberg, Hermanus (Brekfisbaai), and St. James.

== Habitat and ecology ==
The species was originally collected while searching for Desis spiders in the interspaces of calcareous masses built up by marine annelids. These might be littoral spiders or a derivative of the South African terrestrial fauna. The Hermanus specimen was sampled from a coastal dune.

== Description ==
Hahnia abrahami is known from both sexes.

== Conservation ==
Hahnia abrahami is listed as Data Deficient due to insufficient knowledge about its distribution, habitat requirements, and potential threats. Two of the records were sampled prior to 1915, with only the third specimen collected from Hermanus more recently in 2008. More sampling is needed to determine the species' range. As a littoral species, oil spills and sea pollution may pose threats.

== Taxonomy ==
The species was originally described by John Hewitt in 1915 as Muizenbergia abrahami from Muizenberg. It was revised by Bosmans in 1992 and transferred to the genus Hahnia.
