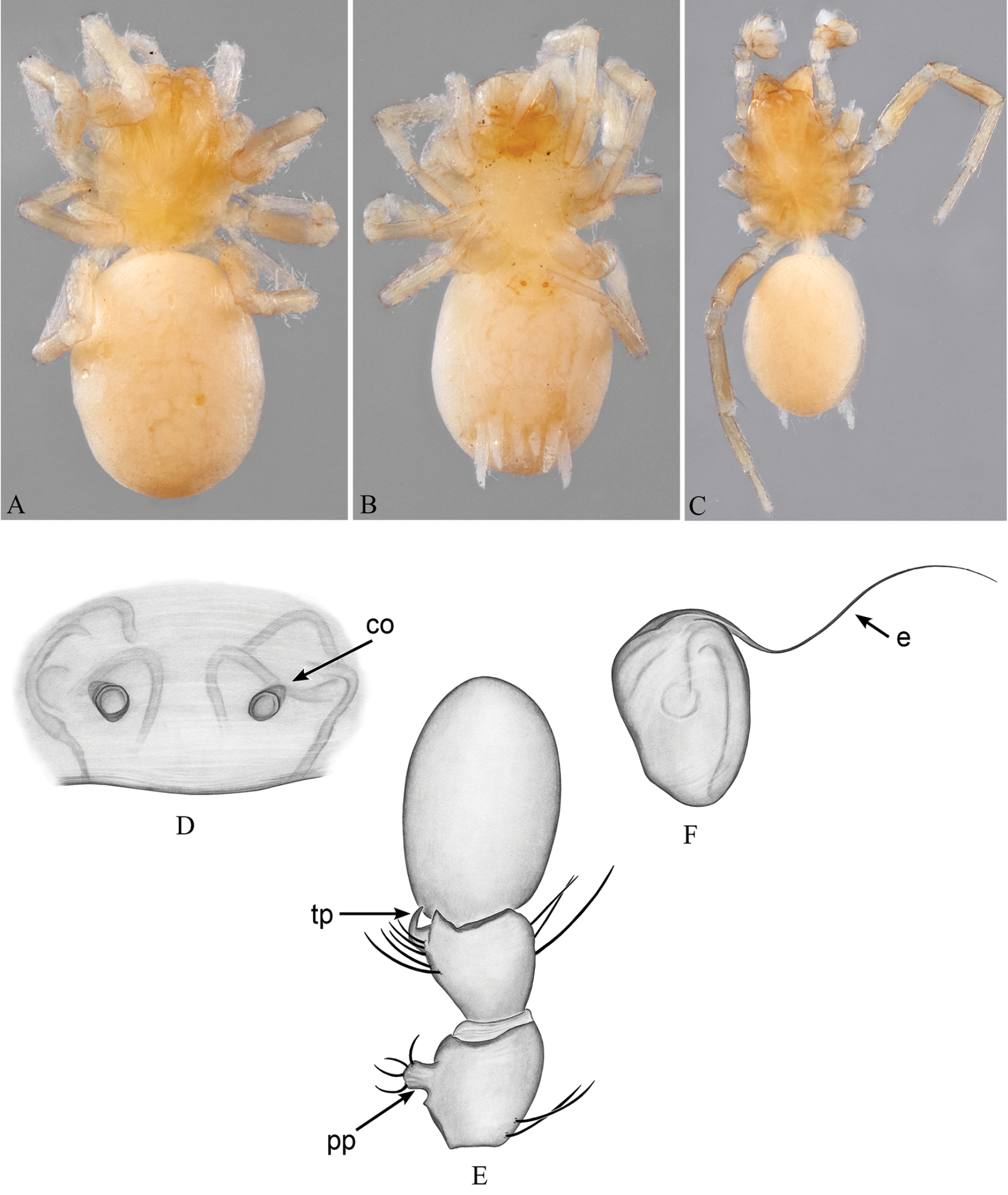

Scientific classification
- Kingdom: Animalia
- Phylum: Arthropoda
- Subphylum: Chelicerata
- Class: Arachnida
- Order: Araneae
- Infraorder: Araneomorphae
- Family: Hahniidae
- Genus: Intihuatana; Lehtinen, 1967
- Species: I. antarctica

Binomial name
- Intihuatana antarctica (Simon, 1902)

= Intihuatana antarctica =

Genus of spiders

Intihuatana antarctica is a species of South American spider in the dwarf sheet spider family, Hahniidae. It is the only species in the monotypic genus Intihuatana. It was first described by Eugène Simon in 1902, and was moved to its present genus by Pekka T. Lehtinen in 1967. It has only been found in Argentina.
