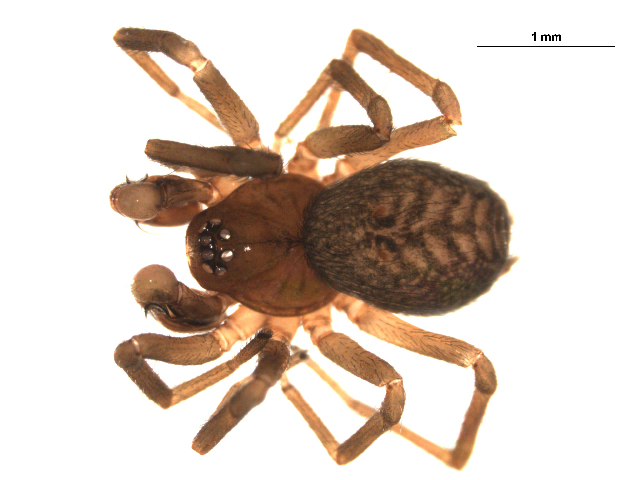
- A. brunnea, adult male

Conservation status
- Secure (NatureServe)

Scientific classification
- Kingdom: Animalia
- Phylum: Arthropoda
- Subphylum: Chelicerata
- Class: Arachnida
- Order: Araneae
- Infraorder: Araneomorphae
- Family: Hahniidae
- Genus: Antistea
- Species: A. brunnea

Binomial name
- Antistea brunnea (Emerton, 1909)

= Antistea brunnea =

Species of spider

Antistea brunnea is a species of true spider in the family Hahniidae. It is found in the United States and Canada.
