= Alistra reinga =

Conservation status
- Naturally Uncommon (NZ TCS)

Scientific classification
- Kingdom: Animalia
- Phylum: Arthropoda
- Subphylum: Chelicerata
- Class: Arachnida
- Order: Araneae
- Infraorder: Araneomorphae
- Family: Hahniidae
- Genus: Alistra
- Species: A. reinga

Binomial name
- Alistra reinga (Forster, 1970)

Synonyms
- Tawerana reinga

Species of spider

Alistra reinga is a species of Hahniidae spider endemic to New Zealand.

== Taxonomy ==
This species was described as Tawerana reinga in 1970 by Ray Forster from male and female specimens. In 1986 it was transferred to the Alistra genus. The holotype is stored in Otago Museum.

== Description ==
The male is recorded at 1.41mm in length whereas the female is 1.56mm. The carapace has a black patch dorsally. The abdomen has black markings dorsally.

== Distribution ==
This species is only known from the Te Paki Sand Dunes in Northland Region, New Zealand.

== Conservation status ==
Under the New Zealand Threat Classification System, this species is listed as "Naturally Uncommon".
