= Harmiella =

Scientific classification
- Domain: Eukaryota
- Kingdom: Animalia
- Phylum: Arthropoda
- Subphylum: Chelicerata
- Class: Arachnida
- Order: Araneae
- Infraorder: Araneomorphae
- Family: Hahniidae
- Genus: Harmiella; Brignoli, 1979
- Species: H. schiapelliae

Binomial name
- Harmiella schiapelliae Brignoli, 1979

Genus of spiders

Harmiella is a monotypic genus of South American dwarf sheet spiders containing the single species, Harmiella schiapelliae. It was first described by Paolo Brignoli in 1979, and has only been found in Brazil. The genus is named in honour of German arachnologist Marie Harm.
