= Porioides tasmani =

Conservation status
- Data Deficit (NZ TCS)

Scientific classification
- Kingdom: Animalia
- Phylum: Arthropoda
- Subphylum: Chelicerata
- Class: Arachnida
- Order: Araneae
- Infraorder: Araneomorphae
- Family: Hahniidae
- Genus: Porioides
- Species: P. tasmani

Binomial name
- Porioides tasmani (Forster, 1970)

Synonyms
- Poria tasmani

Species of spider

Porioides tasmani is a species of Hahniidae spider endemic to New Zealand.

== Taxonomy ==
This species was described as Poria tasmani by Ray Forster in 1970 from male specimens. It was renamed as Porioides tasmani in 1989. The holotype is stored in Otago Museum.

== Description ==
The male is recorded at 1.46mm in length. The carapace is pale yellow. The abdomen has a chevron pattern dorsally.

== Distribution ==
This species is only known from Nelson, New Zealand.

== Conservation status ==
Under the New Zealand Threat Classification System, this species is listed as "Data Deficient" with the qualifiers of "Data Poor: Size", "Data Poor: Trend" and "One Location".
