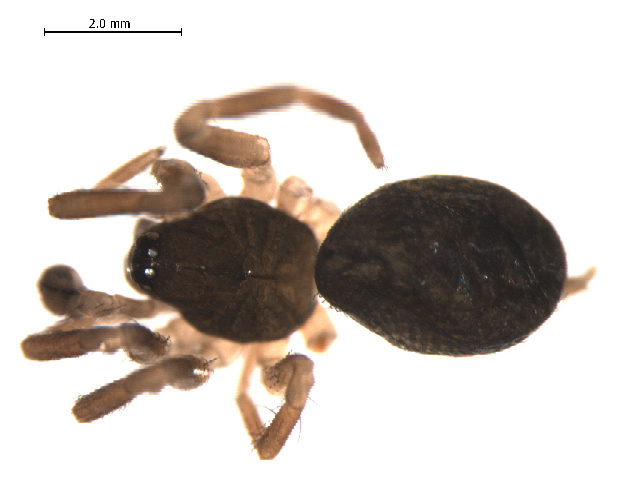
- H. cinerea, adult male
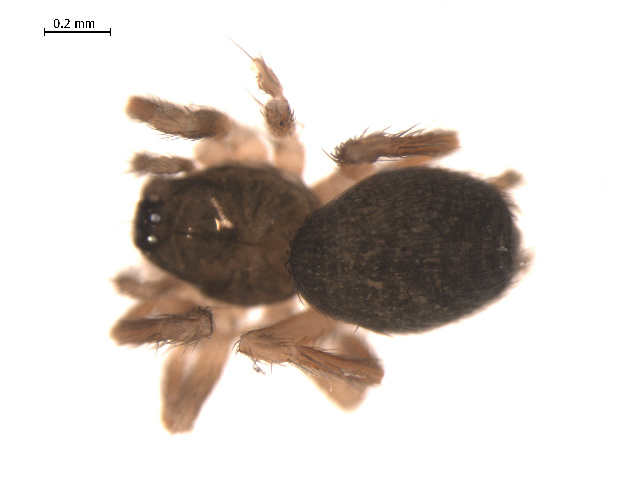
- H. cinerea, adult female

Scientific classification
- Domain: Eukaryota
- Kingdom: Animalia
- Phylum: Arthropoda
- Subphylum: Chelicerata
- Class: Arachnida
- Order: Araneae
- Infraorder: Araneomorphae
- Family: Hahniidae
- Genus: Hahnia
- Species: H. cinerea

Binomial name
- Hahnia cinerea Emerton, 1890

= Hahnia cinerea =

Species of spider

Hahnia cinerea is a species of true spider in the family Hahniidae. It is found in North America.
