= Hahniharmia =

Scientific classification
- Kingdom: Animalia
- Phylum: Arthropoda
- Subphylum: Chelicerata
- Class: Arachnida
- Order: Araneae
- Infraorder: Araneomorphae
- Family: Hahniidae
- Genus: Hahniharmia; Wunderlich, 2004
- Species: H. picta

Binomial name
- Hahniharmia picta (Kulczyński, 1897)

Synonyms
- Hahnia picta Kulczyński, 1897

Genus of spiders

Hahniharmia is a genus of spiders in the family Hahniidae. It was first described in 2004 by Wunderlich. As of 2025, it contains only one species, Hahniharmia picta. The genus is named in honour of German arachnologist Marie Harm.
