= Alistra mangareia =

Conservation status
- Data Deficit (NZ TCS)

Scientific classification
- Kingdom: Animalia
- Phylum: Arthropoda
- Subphylum: Chelicerata
- Class: Arachnida
- Order: Araneae
- Infraorder: Araneomorphae
- Family: Hahniidae
- Genus: Alistra
- Species: A. mangareia

Binomial name
- Alistra mangareia (Forster, 1970)

Synonyms
- Tawerana mangareia

Species of spider

Alistra mangareia is a species of Hahniidae spider endemic to New Zealand.

== Taxonomy ==
This species was described as Tawerana mangareia in 1970 by Ray Forster from a female specimen. In 1986 it was transferred to the Alistra genus. The holotype is stored in Otago Museum.

== Description ==
The female is recorded at 1.59mm in length. The carapace is pale brown with dark markings dorsally. The legs pale yellow. The abdomen is shaded dark brown dorsally and has pale markings dorsally.

== Distribution ==
This species is only known from Wairarapa, New Zealand.

== Conservation status ==
Under the New Zealand Threat Classification System, this species is listed as "Data Deficient" with the qualifiers of "Data Poor: Size", "Data Poor: Trend" and "One Location".
