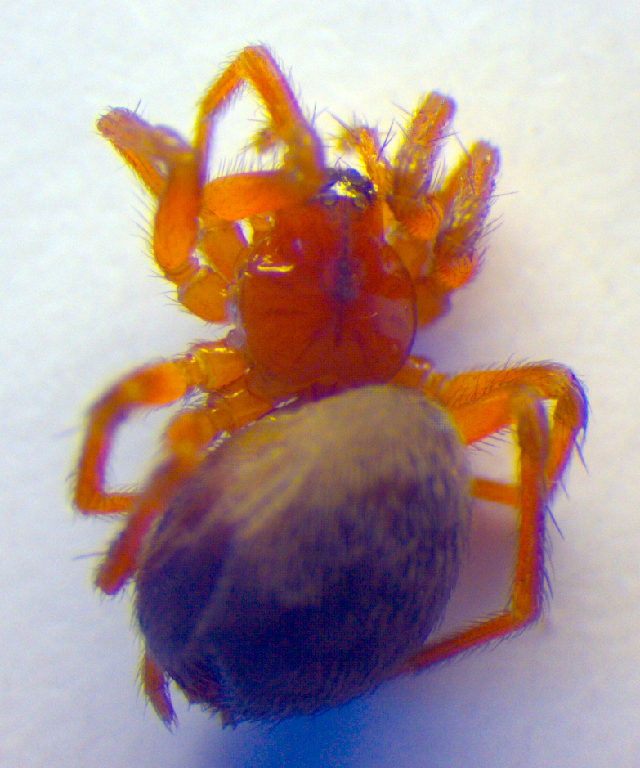

Scientific classification
- Domain: Eukaryota
- Kingdom: Animalia
- Phylum: Arthropoda
- Subphylum: Chelicerata
- Class: Arachnida
- Order: Araneae
- Infraorder: Araneomorphae
- Family: Hahniidae
- Genus: Antistea
- Species: A. elegans

Binomial name
- Antistea elegans (Blackwall, 1841)

Synonyms
- Agelena elegans Blackwall, 1841; Hahnia pratensis C. L. Koch, 1841; Hahnia elegans (Blackwall, 1841); Hahnia propinqua Simon, 1875

= Antistea elegans =

Species of spider

Anitistea elegans, the marsh combtail, is a species of dwarf sheet web spider in the family Hahniidae which has a Palearctic distribution.

== Description ==
Antistea elegans are small spiders the males have a body length of 2.3-2.6mm, the females 2.5-4.3mm. Their most obvious feature is the arrangement of their spinners in a transverse row. The prosoma is yellow-brown to reddish yellow, with dark spots while the opisthosoma is dark grey-brown with brighter patches.

== Biology ==
Antistea elegans constructs small sheet webs over depressions in wetland soil, normally underneath plants. The adults have been found mainly in late summer and autumn, although females have been recorded throughout the year.

== Habitat ==
In Great Britain Antistea elegans has been recorded from fens, marshes, upland blanket bogs, lowland raised bogs, seeps and woodland pool-sides. Specimens have been recorded from wet Sphagnum in Snowdonia National Park at 470m. It has been recorded from similar wetland habitats in Germany.

== Distribution ==
Antistea elegans has a Palearctic distribution. It is widespread in Great Britain and Europe as farwest as Ireland, south to Tunisia and east to Japan.
