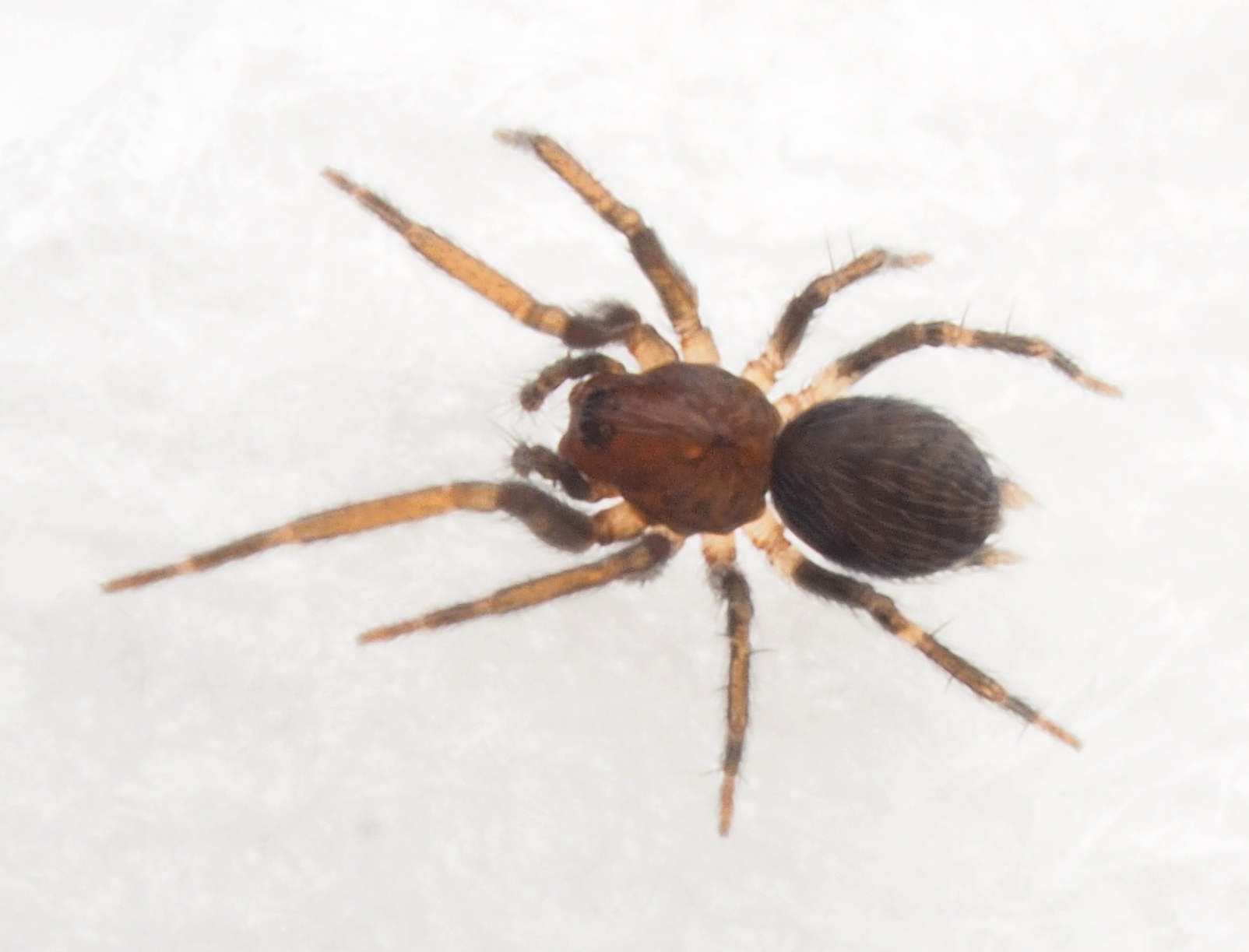
- Alistra sp. in Queensland, Australia

Scientific classification
- Kingdom: Animalia
- Phylum: Arthropoda
- Subphylum: Chelicerata
- Class: Arachnida
- Order: Araneae
- Infraorder: Araneomorphae
- Family: Hahniidae
- Genus: Alistra; Thorell, 1894

Type species
- A. longicauda Thorell, 1894

Species
- 22, see text

Synonyms
- Aviola Simon, 1898; Bigois Simon, 1898; Nannonymphaeus Rainbow, 1920; Tawerana Forster, 1970

= Alistra =

Genus of spiders

Alistra is a genus of dwarf sheet spiders that was first described by Tamerlan Thorell in 1894.

== Species ==
As of October 2025, this genus includes 22 species:

- Alistra annulata Zhang, Li & Zheng, 2011 – China
- Alistra astrolomae (Hickman, 1948) – Australia (Tasmania)
- Alistra berlandi (Marples, 1955) – Samoa
- Alistra centralis (Forster, 1970) – New Zealand
- Alistra hamata Zhang, Li & Pham, 2013 – Vietnam
- Alistra hippocampa Zhang, Li & Zheng, 2011 – China
- Alistra inanga (Forster, 1970) – New Zealand
- Alistra longicauda Thorell, 1894 – Indonesia (Sumatra) (type species)
- Alistra mangareia (Forster, 1970) – New Zealand
- Alistra mendanai Brignoli, 1986 – Solomon Islands, Réunion
- Alistra myops (Simon, 1898) – Philippines
- Alistra napua (Forster, 1970) – New Zealand
- Alistra opina (Forster, 1970) – New Zealand
- Alistra personata Ledoux, 2004 – Réunion
- Alistra pikachu Lin & Li, 2021 – China
- Alistra pusilla (Rainbow, 1920) – Australia (Lord Howe Island)
- Alistra radleyi (Simon, 1898) – Sri Lanka
- Alistra reinga (Forster, 1970) – New Zealand
- Alistra stenura (Simon, 1898) – Sri Lanka
- Alistra sulawesensis Bosmans, 1992 – Indonesia (Sulawesi)
- Alistra taprobanica (Simon, 1898) – Sri Lanka
- Alistra tuna (Forster, 1970) – New Zealand
