= Alistra radleyi =

Scientific classification
- Kingdom: Animalia
- Phylum: Arthropoda
- Subphylum: Chelicerata
- Class: Arachnida
- Order: Araneae
- Infraorder: Araneomorphae
- Family: Hahniidae
- Genus: Alistra
- Species: A. radleyi

Binomial name
- Alistra radleyi (Simon, 1898)

Species of spider

Alistra radleyi is a species of spider of the genus Alistra. It is endemic to Sri Lanka.
