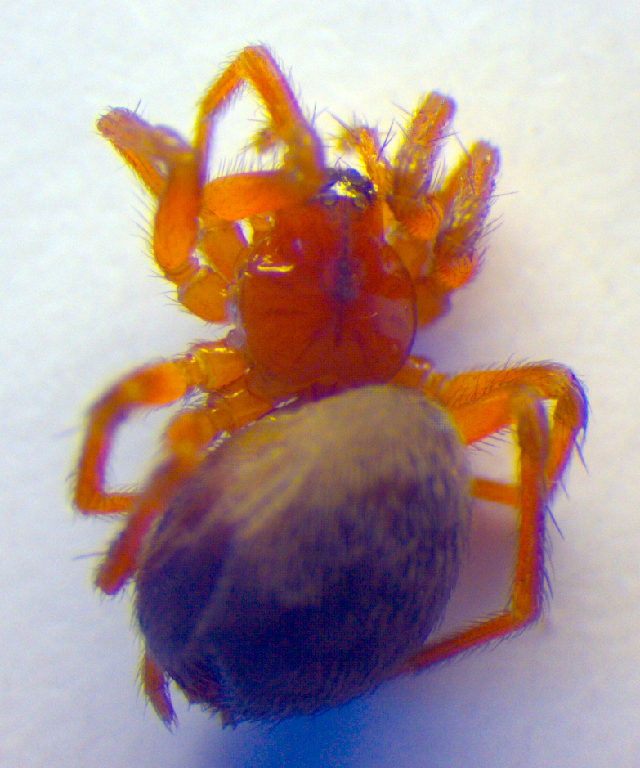
- Antistea elegans

Scientific classification
- Domain: Eukaryota
- Kingdom: Animalia
- Phylum: Arthropoda
- Subphylum: Chelicerata
- Class: Arachnida
- Order: Araneae
- Infraorder: Araneomorphae
- Family: Hahniidae
- Genus: Antistea; Simon, 1898

Type species
- A. elegans (Blackwall, 1841)

Species
- A. brunnea (Emerton, 1909) – USA, Canada; A. elegans (Blackwall, 1841) – Europe, Turkey, Russia (Europe to South Siberia), Japan

= Antistea =

Genus of spiders

Antistea is a genus of dwarf sheet spiders that was first described by Eugène Simon in 1898. As of May 2019 it contains only two species: A. brunnea and A. elegans. Combined, they have a Holarctic distribution, one Palearctic and the other Nearctic.
