= Rinawa otagoensis =

Conservation status
- Not Threatened (NZ TCS)

Scientific classification
- Kingdom: Animalia
- Phylum: Arthropoda
- Subphylum: Chelicerata
- Class: Arachnida
- Order: Araneae
- Infraorder: Araneomorphae
- Family: Hahniidae
- Genus: Rinawa
- Species: R. otagoensis

Binomial name
- Rinawa otagoensis Forster, 1970

Species of spider

Rinawa otagoensis is a species of Hahniidae spider endemic to New Zealand.

== Taxonomy ==
This species was described by Ray Forster in 1970 from male and female specimens. It is the type species of Rinawa. The holotype is stored in Otago Museum.

== Description ==
The male is recorded at 2.47mm in length whereas the female is 2.37mm. The carapace is pale yellow with black shading.

== Distribution ==
This species is only known from Otago, New Zealand.

== Conservation status ==
Under the New Zealand Threat Classification System, this species is listed as "Not Threatened".
