= Alistra stenura =

Scientific classification
- Kingdom: Animalia
- Phylum: Arthropoda
- Subphylum: Chelicerata
- Class: Arachnida
- Order: Araneae
- Infraorder: Araneomorphae
- Family: Hahniidae
- Genus: Alistra
- Species: A. stenura

Binomial name
- Alistra stenura (Simon, 1898)

Species of spider

Alistra stenura, is a species of spider of the genus Alistra. It is endemic to Sri Lanka.
