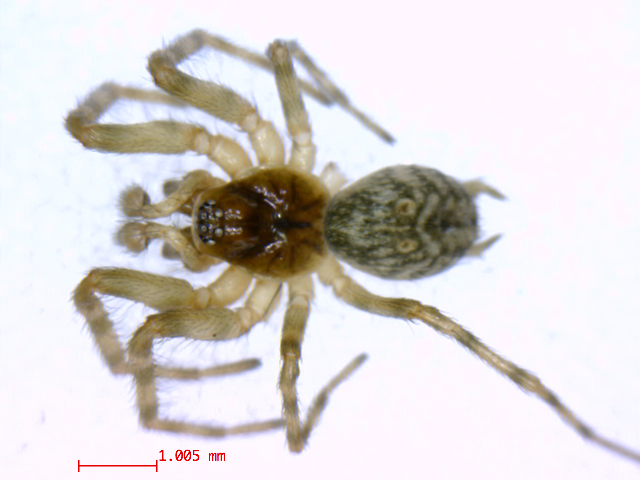

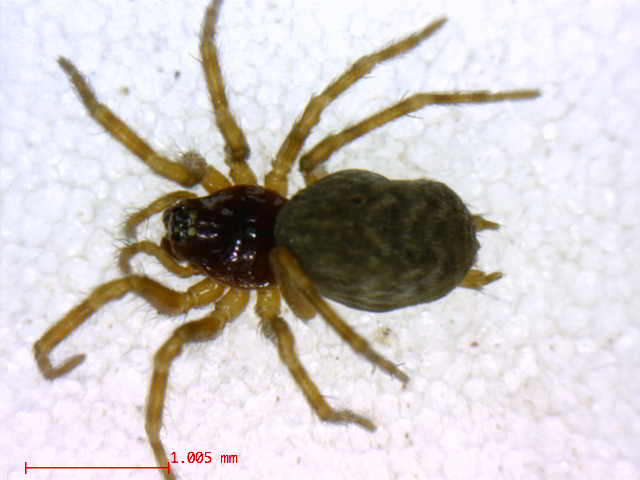
- N. magna

Scientific classification
- Domain: Eukaryota
- Kingdom: Animalia
- Phylum: Arthropoda
- Subphylum: Chelicerata
- Class: Arachnida
- Order: Araneae
- Infraorder: Araneomorphae
- Family: Hahniidae
- Genus: Neoantistea
- Species: N. magna

Binomial name
- Neoantistea magna (Keyserling, 1887)

= Neoantistea magna =

Species of spider

Neoantistea magna is a species of true spider in the family Hahniidae. It is found in the United States and Canada.
