= Pacifantistea =

Scientific classification
- Kingdom: Animalia
- Phylum: Arthropoda
- Subphylum: Chelicerata
- Class: Arachnida
- Order: Araneae
- Infraorder: Araneomorphae
- Family: Hahniidae
- Genus: Pacifantistea; Marusik, 2011
- Species: P. ovtchinnikovi

Binomial name
- Pacifantistea ovtchinnikovi Marusik, 2011

Genus of spiders

Pacifantistea is a monotypic genus of Asian dwarf sheet spiders containing the single species, Pacifantistea ovtchinnikovi. It was first described by Yuri M. Marusik in 2011, and has only been found in Russia and in Japan.
