= Hahnia oreophila =

Scientific classification
- Kingdom: Animalia
- Phylum: Arthropoda
- Subphylum: Chelicerata
- Class: Arachnida
- Order: Araneae
- Infraorder: Araneomorphae
- Family: Hahniidae
- Genus: Hahnia
- Species: H. oreophila

Binomial name
- Hahnia oreophila Simon, 1898

Species of spider

Hahnia oreophila, is a species of spider of the genus Hahnia. It is endemic to Sri Lanka.
