= Porioides =

Scientific classification
- Kingdom: Animalia
- Phylum: Arthropoda
- Subphylum: Chelicerata
- Class: Arachnida
- Order: Araneae
- Infraorder: Araneomorphae
- Family: Hahniidae
- Genus: Porioides; Forster, 1989

Type species
- P. rima (Forster, 1970)

Species
- P. rima (Forster, 1970) – New Zealand; P. tasmani (Forster, 1970) – New Zealand

Genus of spiders

Porioides is a genus of South Pacific dwarf sheet spiders that was first described by Norman I. Platnick in 1989. As of May 2019 it contains only two species, both found in New Zealand: P. rima and P. tasmani.
