= Hahnia clathrata =

Cape Comb-Tailed Spider

Conservation status
- Least Concern (SANBI Red List)

Scientific classification
- Kingdom: Animalia
- Phylum: Arthropoda
- Subphylum: Chelicerata
- Class: Arachnida
- Order: Araneae
- Infraorder: Araneomorphae
- Family: Hahniidae
- Genus: Hahnia
- Species: H. clathrata

Binomial name
- Hahnia clathrata Simon, 1898

Species of spider

Hahnia clathrata is a species of spider in the family Hahniidae. It is endemic to southern Africa and is commonly known as the Cape comb-tailed spider.

== Distribution ==
Hahnia clathrata is a southern African endemic, recorded from Namibia and South Africa. In South Africa it is known from four provinces: Eastern Cape, KwaZulu-Natal, Mpumalanga, and Western Cape. The species occurs at elevations ranging from 39 to 1698 m above sea level.

== Habitat and ecology ==
The species makes small sheet-webs in litter and has been sampled from the Fynbos, Savanna, and Thicket biomes.

== Description ==
Hahnia clathrata is known only from the female.

== Conservation ==
Hahnia clathrata is listed as Least Concern by the South African National Biodiversity Institute due to its wide geographic range. The species is protected in ten protected areas.

== Taxonomy ==
The species was originally described by Eugène Simon in 1898 with the type locality given only as "Prom. Bonae Spei" (Cape of Good Hope). Although identification of the male is still problematic, the female has been sampled over a wide range.
