= Hahnia larseni =

Scientific classification
- Kingdom: Animalia
- Phylum: Arthropoda
- Subphylum: Chelicerata
- Class: Arachnida
- Order: Araneae
- Infraorder: Araneomorphae
- Family: Hahniidae
- Genus: Hahnia
- Species: H. larseni

Binomial name
- Hahnia larseni Marusik, 2017

Species of spider

Hahnia larseni is a species of spider in the family Hahniidae. It is endemic to South Africa.

== Distribution ==
Hahnia larseni is endemic to the Western Cape province of South Africa. It is known only from six specimens sampled at the type locality at 322 m above sea level.

== Habitat and ecology ==
The species was sampled from litter under bushes in the Fynbos biome.

== Description ==
Hahnia larseni is known from both sexes.

== Conservation ==
Hahnia larseni is listed as Data Deficient due to insufficient knowledge about its habitat and threats. More sampling is needed to determine the species' range. The species is protected in Karoo Desert National Botanical Garden. As this species' distribution has yet to be determined, the threats are still unknown; however, if it occurs more widely in the Breede River Valley it may be threatened by habitat loss as a result of vineyard cultivation and urban development.

== Taxonomy ==
The species was described by Yuri Marusik in 2017 from the Karoo Desert National Botanical Garden.
