= Hahnia schubotzi =

Schubotz's Comb-Tailed Spider

Conservation status
- Least Concern (SANBI Red List)

Scientific classification
- Kingdom: Animalia
- Phylum: Arthropoda
- Subphylum: Chelicerata
- Class: Arachnida
- Order: Araneae
- Infraorder: Araneomorphae
- Family: Hahniidae
- Genus: Hahnia
- Species: H. schubotzi

Binomial name
- Hahnia schubotzi Strand, 1913

Synonyms
- Hahnia macrovulva Strand, 1913; Hahnia rouleti Lessert, 1915; Hahnia kästneri Roewer, 1955

Species of spider

Hahnia schubotzi is a species of spider in the family Hahniidae. It is found in several African countries and is commonly known as Schubotz's comb-tailed spider.

== Distribution ==
Hahnia schubotzi is an African endemic found in Rwanda, Tanzania, Kenya, and South Africa. In South Africa it is presently known from two provinces, Mpumalanga and Western Cape, at elevations ranging from 103 to 1,557 m above sea level.

== Habitat and ecology ==
The species makes small sheet-webs in litter and has been sampled from the Savanna and Fynbos biomes as well as in apple orchards.

== Description ==
Hahnia schubotzi is known from both sexes.

== Conservation ==
Hahnia schubotzi is listed as Least Concern by the South African National Biodiversity Institute due to its wide geographical range in Africa. The species is protected in the Bergvliet Forest Station.

== Etymology ==
The species is named after German zoologist Hermann Schubotz (1881–1955).

== Taxonomy ==
The species was originally described by Embrik Strand in 1913 from Rwanda. It was redescribed by Bosmans in 1986, who synonymized several related species including Hahnia kästneri and H. rouleti.
