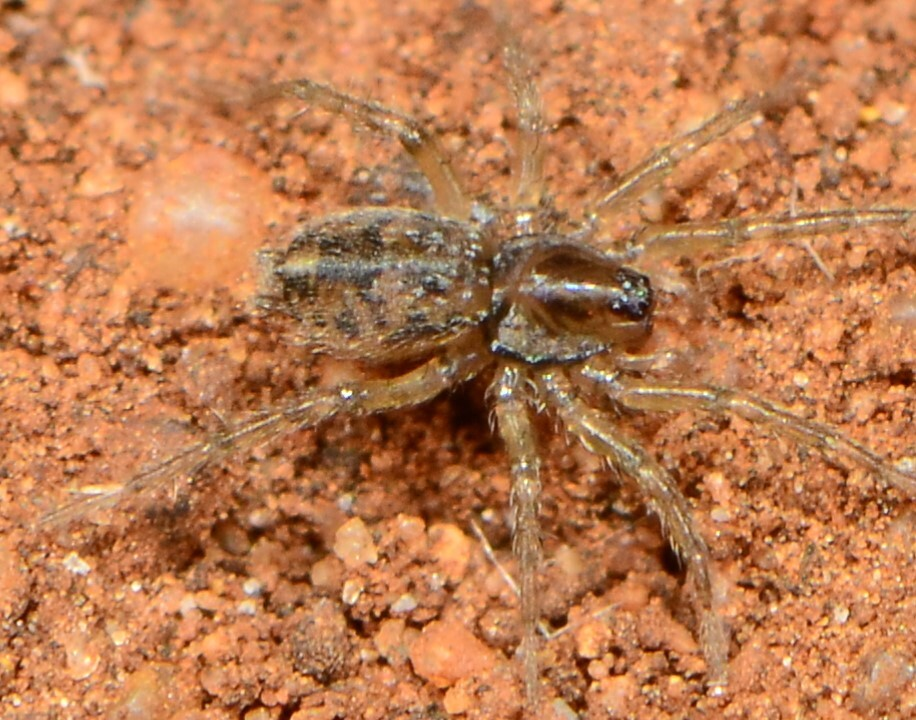
- Female H. lobata
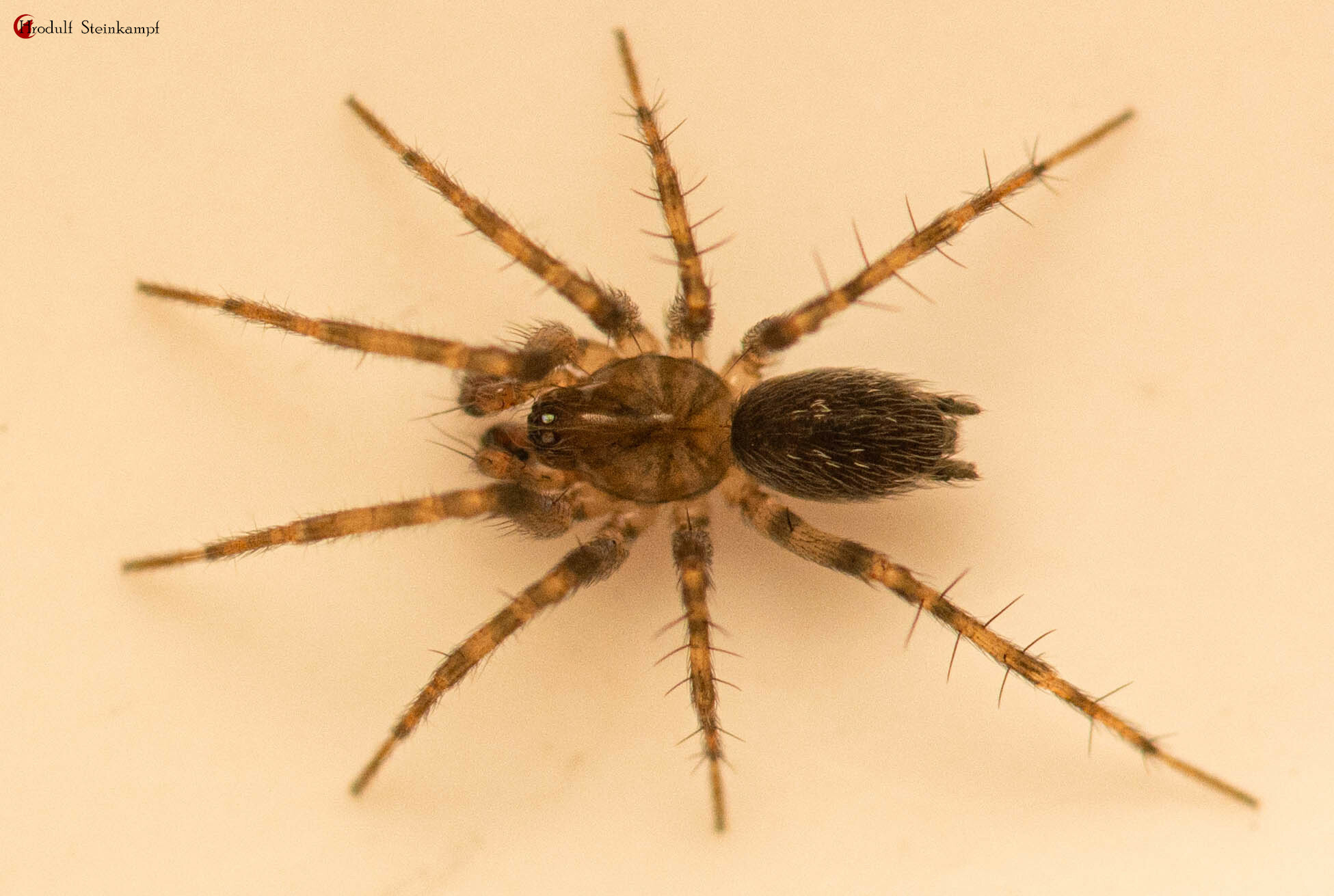
- Male H. tabulicola

Scientific classification
- Kingdom: Animalia
- Phylum: Arthropoda
- Subphylum: Chelicerata
- Class: Arachnida
- Order: Araneae
- Infraorder: Araneomorphae
- Family: Hahniidae
- Genus: Hahnia; C. L. Koch, 1841

Type species
- H. pusilla C. L. Koch, 1841

Species
- 105, see text

Synonyms
- Hahniops Roewer, 1942; Hahnistea Chamberlin & Ivie, 1942; Muizenbergia Hewitt, 1915; Simonida Schiapelli & Gerschman, 1958; Unzickeria Lehtinen, 1967

= Hahnia (spider) =

Genus of spiders

Hahnia is a genus of dwarf sheet spiders that was first described by C. L. Koch in 1841.

== Species ==
As of October 2025, this genus includes 105 species:

- Hahnia abrahami (Hewitt, 1915) – South Africa
- Hahnia alini Tikader, 1964 – Nepal
- Hahnia anophthalma Barrientos & Mederos, 2024 – Morocco
- Hahnia arizonica Chamberlin & Ivie, 1942 – Alaska, Canada, United States
- Hahnia banksi Fage, 1938 – Costa Rica, Panama
- Hahnia barbara Denis, 1937 – Algeria
- Hahnia barbata Bosmans, 1992 – Indonesia (Sulawesi)
- Hahnia benoiti Bosmans & Thijs, 1980 – Kenya
- Hahnia biapophysis Huang & Zhang, 2017 – China
- Hahnia breviducta Bosmans & Thijs, 1980 – Kenya
- Hahnia caelebs Brignoli, 1978 – Bhutan
- Hahnia cameroonensis Bosmans, 1987 – Cameroon
- Hahnia cervicornata Wang & Zhang, 1986 – China
- Hahnia chaoyangensis C. D. Zhu & S. F. Zhu, 1983 – China
- Hahnia cinerea Emerton, 1890 – Alaska, Canada, United States, Mexico
- Hahnia clathrata Simon, 1898 – Namibia, South Africa
- Hahnia corticicola Bösenberg & Strand, 1906 – Russia (East Siberia, Far East), Korea, Japan, China, Taiwan
- Hahnia crozetensis Hickman, 1939 – Crozet Is.
- Hahnia deiocesi Zamani & Marusik, 2021 – Iran
- Hahnia dewittei Bosmans, 1986 – DR Congo
- Hahnia dongi Huang & Zhang, 2017 – China
- Hahnia eburneensis Jocqué & Bosmans, 1982 – Ivory Coast
- Hahnia eidmanni (Roewer, 1942) – Equatorial Guinea (Bioko)
- Hahnia falcata Wang, 1989 – China
- Hahnia flaviceps Emerton, 1913 – United States
- Hahnia gigantea Bosmans, 1986 – DR Congo, Uganda
- Hahnia glacialis Sørensen, 1898 – Russia (East Siberia, Far East), Alaska, Canada, United States, Greenland
- Hahnia harmae Brignoli, 1977 – Tunisia
- Hahnia hauseri Brignoli, 1978 – Spain (Balearic Is.)
- Hahnia helveola Simon, 1875 – Europe, Turkey, Georgia, Azerbaijan
- Hahnia heterophthalma Simon, 1905 – Argentina
- Hahnia himalayaensis Hu & Zhang, 1990 – China, Vietnam
- Hahnia implexa Seo, 2017 – Korea
- Hahnia inflata Benoit, 1978 – Kenya
- Hahnia innupta Brignoli, 1978 – Bhutan
- Hahnia insulana Schenkel, 1938 – Madeira
- Hahnia jiangkou Gan, Wang & Mi, 2023 – China
- Hahnia jocquei Bosmans, 1982 – Malawi
- Hahnia laodiana Song, 1990 – China
- Hahnia larseni Marusik, 2017 – South Africa
- Hahnia laticeps Simon, 1898 – South Africa, St. Helena
- Hahnia lehtineni Brignoli, 1978 – Bhutan
- Hahnia leopoldi Bosmans, 1982 – Cameroon
- Hahnia linderi Wunderlich, 1992 – Canary Islands
- Hahnia lobata Bosmans, 1981 – South Africa
- Hahnia maginii Brignoli, 1977 – Italy
- Hahnia major Benoit, 1978 – Kenya
- Hahnia manengoubensis Bosmans, 1987 – Cameroon
- Hahnia martialis Bösenberg & Strand, 1906 – Japan
- Hahnia mauensis Bosmans, 1986 – Kenya
- Hahnia michaelseni Simon, 1902 – Chile, Argentina, Falkland Is.
- Hahnia molossidis Brignoli, 1979 – Greece
- Hahnia montana Seo, 2017 – Korea
- Hahnia mridulae Tikader, 1970 – India
- Hahnia musica Brignoli, 1978 – Bhutan, China
- Hahnia naguaboi (Lehtinen, 1967) – Puerto Rico
- Hahnia nava (Blackwall, 1841) – Europe, Morocco, Russia (Europe to Far East), Turkey, Israel, Caucasus, Iran, Korea, Japan
- Hahnia ngai Rivera-Quiroz, Petcharad & Miller, 2020 – Thailand
- Hahnia nigricans Benoit, 1978 – Kenya
- Hahnia nobilis Opell & Beatty, 1976 – Mexico
- Hahnia obliquitibialis Bosmans, 1982 – Malawi
- Hahnia okefinokensis Chamberlin & Ivie, 1934 – United States
- Hahnia ononidum Simon, 1875 – Canada, United States, Europe, Turkey, Russia (Europe to Far East), Kazakhstan, China
- Hahnia oreophila Simon, 1898 – Sri Lanka
- Hahnia ovata Song & Zheng, 1982 – China
- Hahnia petrobia Simon, 1875 – Spain, France, Italy, Germany
- Hahnia pinicola Arita, 1978 – Japan
- Hahnia pusilla C. L. Koch, 1841 – Europe, Russia (Europe, Caucasus, South Siberia) (type species)
- Hahnia pusio Simon, 1898 – Sri Lanka
- Hahnia pyriformis Yin & Wang, 1984 – China
- Hahnia quadriseta Galán-Sánchez & Álvarez-Padilla, 2017 – Mexico
- Hahnia rimiformis Zhang, Li & Pham, 2013 – Vietnam
- Hahnia rossii Brignoli, 1977 – Italy, Iran
- Hahnia saccata Zhang, Li & Zheng, 2011 – China, Thailand
- Hahnia sanjuanensis Exline, 1938 – United States, Mexico
- Hahnia schubotzi Strand, 1913 – Kenya, Rwanda, Tanzania, South Africa
- Hahnia sexoculata Ponomarev, 2009 – Russia (Caucasus)
- Hahnia sibirica Marusik, Hippa & Koponen, 1996 – Russia (Europe to Far East), China
- Hahnia simoni Mello-Leitão, 1919 – Brazil
- Hahnia sirimoni Benoit, 1978 – Kenya
- Hahnia spasskyi Denis, 1958 – Afghanistan
- Hahnia spinata Benoit, 1978 – Kenya
- Hahnia subcorticicola Liu, Huang & Zhang, 2015 – China
- Hahnia submaginii Zhang, Li & Zheng, 2011 – China
- Hahnia subsaccata Huang & Zhang, 2017 – China
- Hahnia tabulicola Simon, 1898 – Cameroon, DR Congo, Kenya, Tanzania, Malawi, Botswana, South Africa
- Hahnia tanikawai Suguro, 2015 – Japan
- Hahnia tatei (Gertsch, 1934) – Venezuela
- Hahnia thorntoni Brignoli, 1982 – China, Hong Kong, Laos, Japan
- Hahnia thymorum Emerit & Ledoux, 2014 – France
- Hahnia tikaderi Brignoli, 1978 – Bhutan
- Hahnia tortuosa Song & Kim, 1991 – China
- Hahnia tuybaana Barrion & Litsinger, 1995 – Philippines
- Hahnia ulyxis Brignoli, 1974 – Greece
- Hahnia upembaensis Bosmans, 1986 – Congo
- Hahnia vangoethemi Benoit, 1978 – Kenya
- Hahnia vanwaerebeki Bosmans, 1987 – Cameroon
- Hahnia veracruzana Gertsch & Davis, 1940 – Mexico
- Hahnia wangi Huang & Zhang, 2017 – China
- Hahnia weiningensis Huang, Chen & Zhang, 2018 – China
- Hahnia yakouensis Chen, Yan & Yin, 2009 – China
- Hahnia zhejiangensis Song & Zheng, 1982 – China, Taiwan, Vietnam
- Hahnia zhui Zhang & Chen, 2015 – China
- Hahnia zhuyifani Lin & Li, 2024 – China
- Hahnia zodarioides (Simon, 1898) – South Africa
