= Rinawa cantuaria =

Conservation status
- Not Threatened (NZ TCS)

Scientific classification
- Kingdom: Animalia
- Phylum: Arthropoda
- Subphylum: Chelicerata
- Class: Arachnida
- Order: Araneae
- Infraorder: Araneomorphae
- Family: Hahniidae
- Genus: Rinawa
- Species: R. cantuaria

Binomial name
- Rinawa cantuaria Forster, 1970

Species of spider

Rinawa cantuaria is a species of Hahniidae spider endemic to New Zealand.

== Taxonomy ==
This species was described by Ray Forster in 1970 from male and female specimens. The holotype is stored in Canterbury Museum.

== Description ==
The male is recorded at 1.96mm in length whereas the female is 1.24mm. The carapace is yellow brown. The abdomen has a chevron pattern dorsally.

== Distribution ==
This species is only known from Canterbury, New Zealand.

== Conservation status ==
Under the New Zealand Threat Classification System, this species is listed as "Not Threatened".
