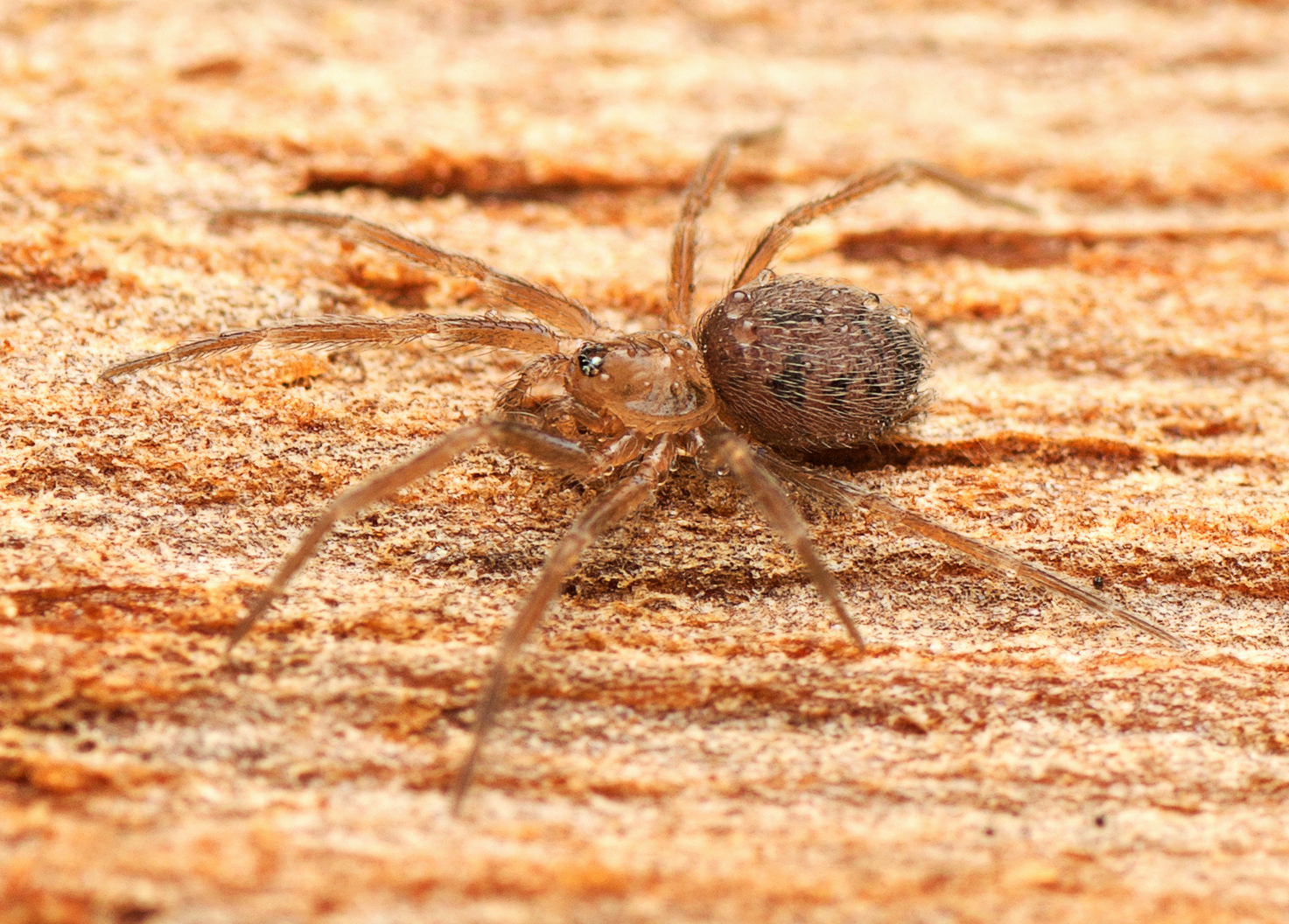
- S. ampullarius in Queensland, Australia

Scientific classification
- Kingdom: Animalia
- Phylum: Arthropoda
- Subphylum: Chelicerata
- Class: Arachnida
- Order: Araneae
- Infraorder: Araneomorphae
- Family: Hahniidae
- Genus: Scotospilus; Simon, 1886

Type species
- S. bicolor Simon, 1886

Species
- 9, see text

Synonyms
- Tuana Forster, 1970

= Scotospilus =

Genus of spiders

Scotospilus is a genus of dwarf sheet spiders that was first described by Eugène Simon in 1886.

== Species ==
As of October 2025, this genus includes nine species:

- Scotospilus ampullarius (Hickman, 1948) – Australia (Tasmania)
- Scotospilus bicolor Simon, 1886 – Australia (Tasmania) (type species)
- Scotospilus divisus (Forster, 1970) – New Zealand
- Scotospilus longus Zhang, Li & Pham, 2013 – Vietnam
- Scotospilus maindroni (Simon, 1906) – India
- Scotospilus nelsonensis (Forster, 1970) – New Zealand
- Scotospilus plenus (Forster, 1970) – New Zealand
- Scotospilus wellingtoni (Hickman, 1948) – Australia (Tasmania)
- Scotospilus westlandicus (Forster, 1970) – New Zealand
