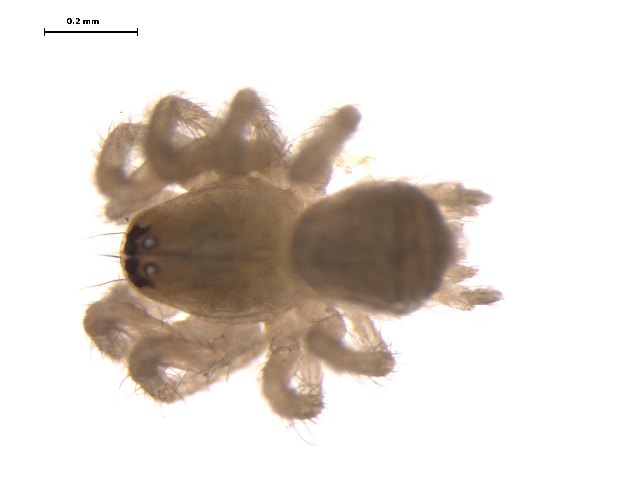
- Immature N. agilis
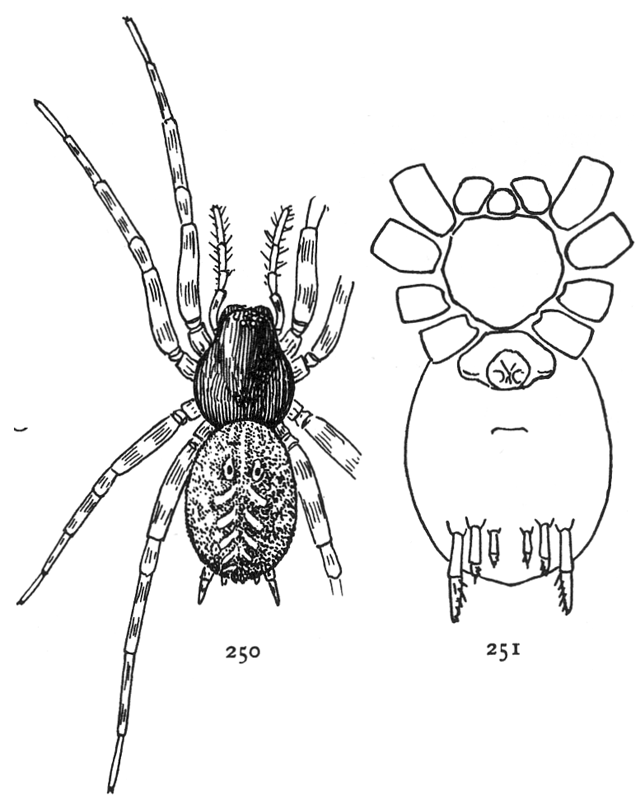
- drawing of N. agilis

Scientific classification
- Kingdom: Animalia
- Phylum: Arthropoda
- Subphylum: Chelicerata
- Class: Arachnida
- Order: Araneae
- Infraorder: Araneomorphae
- Family: Hahniidae
- Genus: Neoantistea; Gertsch, 1934

Type species
- N. agilis (Keyserling, 1887)

Species
- 25, see text

= Neoantistea =

Genus of spiders

Neoantistea is a genus of dwarf sheet spiders that was first described by Willis J. Gertsch in 1934.

== Species ==
As of May 2019 it contains twenty-five species:

- Neoantistea agilis (Keyserling, 1887) (type) – USA, Canada
- Neoantistea alachua Gertsch, 1946 – USA
- Neoantistea aspembira Galán-Sánchez & Álvarez-Padilla, 2017 – Mexico
- Neoantistea caporiaccoi Brignoli, 1976 – Kashmir
- Neoantistea coconino Chamberlin & Ivie, 1942 – USA
- Neoantistea crandalli Gertsch, 1946 – USA
- Neoantistea gosiuta Gertsch, 1934 – USA
- Neoantistea hidalgoensis Opell & Beatty, 1976 – Mexico
- Neoantistea inaffecta Opell & Beatty, 1976 – Mexico
- Neoantistea jacalana Gertsch, 1946 – Mexico
- Neoantistea janetscheki Brignoli, 1976 – Nepal
- Neoantistea kaisaisa Barrion & Litsinger, 1995 – Philippines
- Neoantistea lyrica Opell & Beatty, 1976 – Mexico to Costa Rica
- Neoantistea magna (Keyserling, 1887) – USA, Canada
- Neoantistea maxima (Caporiacco, 1935) – Kashmir
- Neoantistea mulaiki Gertsch, 1946 – USA, Mexico
- Neoantistea multidentata Galán-Sánchez & Álvarez-Padilla, 2017 – Mexico
- Neoantistea oklahomensis Opell & Beatty, 1976 – USA
- Neoantistea procteri Gertsch, 1946 – USA
- Neoantistea pueblensis Opell & Beatty, 1976 – Mexico
- Neoantistea quelpartensis Paik, 1958 – Russia, China, Korea, Japan
- Neoantistea riparia (Keyserling, 1887) – USA
- Neoantistea santana Chamberlin & Ivie, 1942 – USA
- Neoantistea spica Opell & Beatty, 1976 – Mexico
- Neoantistea unifistula Opell & Beatty, 1976 – Mexico
