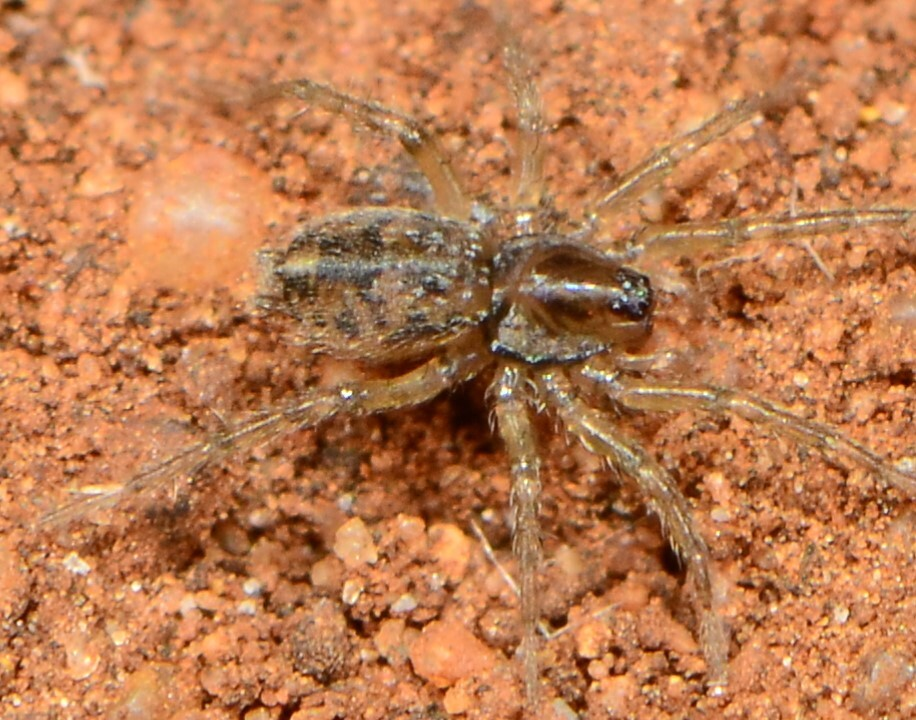
- Female

Scientific classification
- Kingdom: Animalia
- Phylum: Arthropoda
- Subphylum: Chelicerata
- Class: Arachnida
- Order: Araneae
- Infraorder: Araneomorphae
- Family: Hahniidae
- Genus: Hahnia
- Species: H. lobata

Binomial name
- Hahnia lobata Bosmans, 1981

= Hahnia lobata =

Bosman's Comb-Tailed Spider

Species of spider

Hahnia lobata is a species of spider in the family Hahniidae. It is endemic to South Africa and is commonly known as Bosman's comb-tailed spider.

== Distribution ==
Hahnia lobata is endemic to South Africa, known from KwaZulu-Natal and Western Cape. The species occurs at elevations ranging from 24 to 1498 m above sea level.

== Habitat and ecology ==
The species makes small sheet-webs in litter and has been collected from forest litter, pine plantations, and caves in the Fynbos, Forest, Indian Ocean Coastal Belt, and Savanna biomes. The species was commonly found at the Ngome State Forest where more than 650 specimens were sampled with pitfall traps, also from pine forest at Ngome.

== Description ==
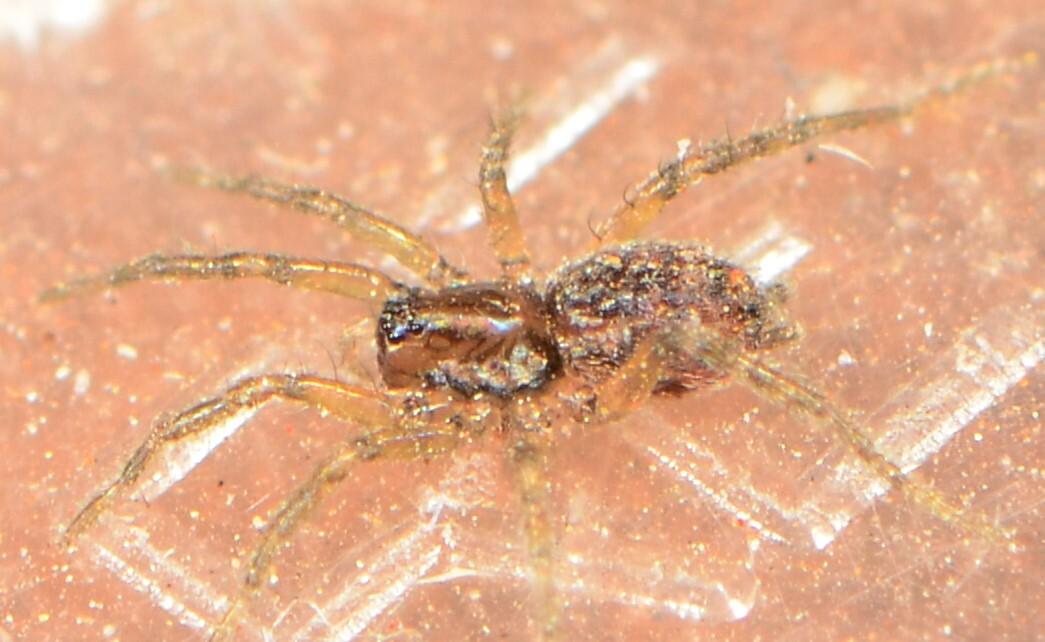
female

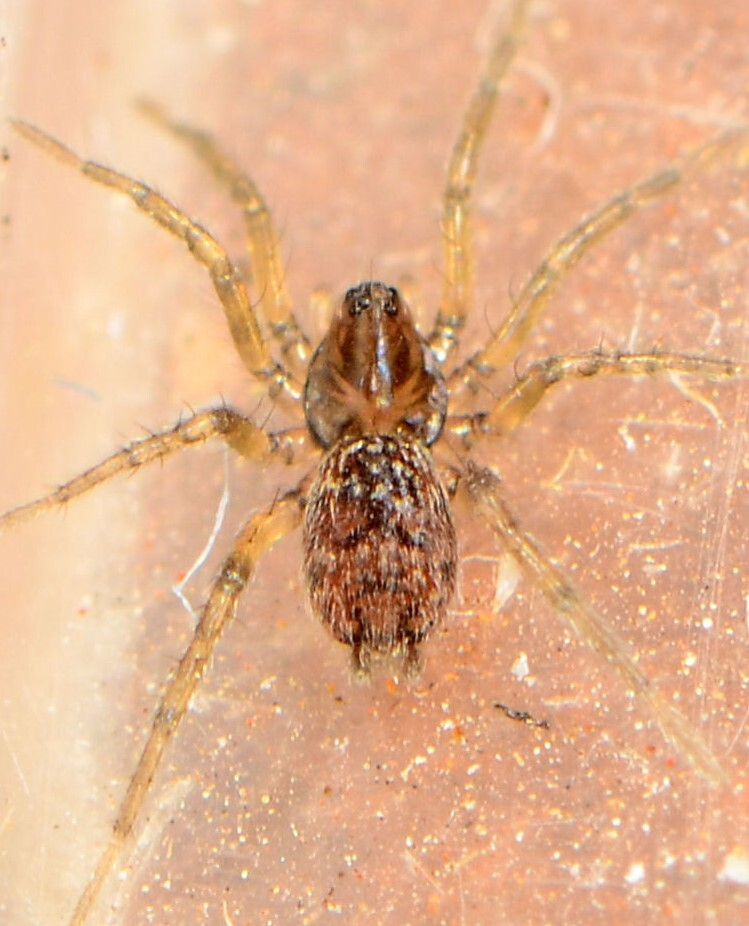
female

== Conservation ==
Hahnia lobata is listed as Least Concern by the South African National Biodiversity Institute due to its wide geographical range. The species is protected in five protected areas.

== Taxonomy ==
The species was described by Belgian arachnologist Robert Bosmans in 1981 from the type locality given only as "Cap de Bonne Espérance" (Cape of Good Hope).
