= Hahnia zodarioides =

Cederberg Comb-Tailed Spider

Conservation status
- Least Concern (SANBI Red List)

Scientific classification
- Kingdom: Animalia
- Phylum: Arthropoda
- Subphylum: Chelicerata
- Class: Arachnida
- Order: Araneae
- Infraorder: Araneomorphae
- Family: Hahniidae
- Genus: Hahnia
- Species: H. zodarioides

Binomial name
- Hahnia zodarioides (Simon, 1898)

Synonyms
- Scotussa zodarioides Simon, 1898; Simonida zodarioides Schiapelli & Gerschman, 1958

Species of spider

Hahnia zodarioides is a species of spider in the family Hahniidae. It is endemic to South Africa and is commonly known as the Cederberg comb-tailed spider.

== Distribution ==
Hahnia zodarioides is endemic to South Africa, known from two provinces: Western Cape and Northern Cape. The species occurs at elevations ranging from 9 to 1755 m above sea level.

== Habitat and ecology ==
The species makes small sheet-webs in litter and has been collected using pitfall traps in the Fynbos biome.

== Description ==
Hahnia zodarioides is known from both sexes, though the male has been sampled but remains undescribed.

== Conservation ==
Hahnia zodarioides is listed as Least Concern by the South African National Biodiversity Institute due to its wide geographic range. The species is protected in several protected areas including the Cederberg Wilderness Area, Asante Sana Private Game Reserve, Witteberg Nature Reserve, and Table Mountain National Park.

== Etymology ==
The specific name is derived from the spider genus Zodarion.

== Taxonomy ==
The species was originally described by Eugène Simon in 1898 as Scotussa zodarioides with the type locality given as Cape of Good Hope. It was transferred to the genus Simonida by Schiapelli & Gerschman in 1958 as a replacement name, then to Hahnia by Robert Bosmans in 1992.
