= Lizarba =

Scientific classification
- Domain: Eukaryota
- Kingdom: Animalia
- Phylum: Arthropoda
- Subphylum: Chelicerata
- Class: Arachnida
- Order: Araneae
- Infraorder: Araneomorphae
- Family: Hahniidae
- Genus: Lizarba; Roth, 1967
- Species: L. separata

Binomial name
- Lizarba separata Roth, 1967

Genus of spiders

Lizarba is a monotypic genus of South American dwarf sheet spiders containing the single species, Lizarba separata. It was first described by V. D. Roth in 1967, and has only been found in Brazil.
