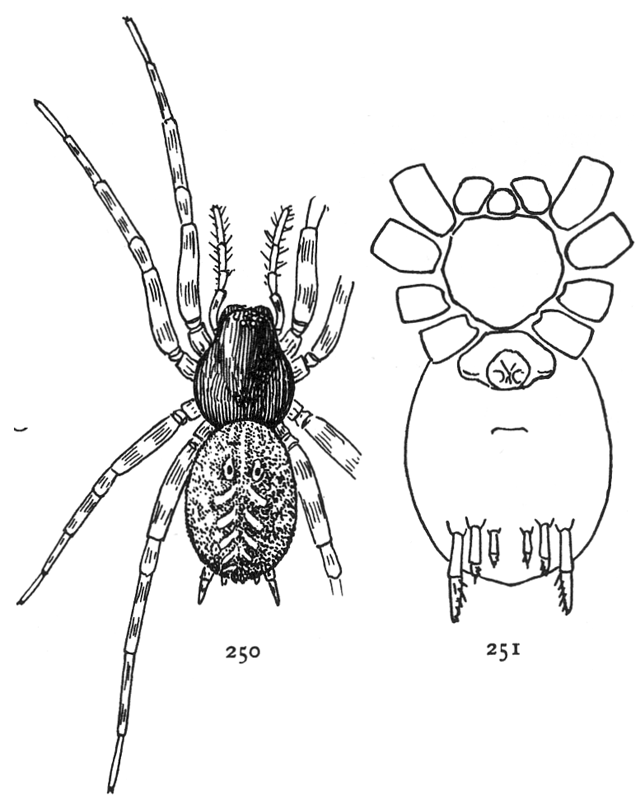

Scientific classification
- Domain: Eukaryota
- Kingdom: Animalia
- Phylum: Arthropoda
- Subphylum: Chelicerata
- Class: Arachnida
- Order: Araneae
- Infraorder: Araneomorphae
- Family: Hahniidae
- Genus: Neoantistea
- Species: N. agilis

Binomial name
- Neoantistea agilis (Keyserling, 1887)

= Neoantistea agilis =

Species of spider

Neoantistea agilis is a species of true spider in the family Hahniidae. It is found in the United States and Canada.
