= Alistra napua =

Conservation status
- Data Deficit (NZ TCS)

Scientific classification
- Kingdom: Animalia
- Phylum: Arthropoda
- Subphylum: Chelicerata
- Class: Arachnida
- Order: Araneae
- Infraorder: Araneomorphae
- Family: Hahniidae
- Genus: Alistra
- Species: A. napua

Binomial name
- Alistra napua (Forster, 1970)

Synonyms
- Tawerana napua

Species of spider

Alistra napua is a species of Hahniidae spider endemic to New Zealand.

== Taxonomy ==
This species was described as Tawerana napua in 1970 by Ray Forster from a male specimen. In 1986 it was transferred to the Alistra genus. The holotype is stored in Otago Museum.

== Description ==
The female is recorded at 2.12mm in length. The carapace is yellow brown with black markings dorsally. The legs have black bands. The abdomen is cream with black markings dorsally.

== Distribution ==
This species is only known from Wellington, New Zealand.

== Conservation status ==
Under the New Zealand Threat Classification System, this species is listed as "Data Deficient" with the qualifiers of "Data Poor: Size", "Data Poor: Trend" and "One Location".
