= Alistra inanga =

Conservation status
- Data Deficit (NZ TCS)

Scientific classification
- Kingdom: Animalia
- Phylum: Arthropoda
- Subphylum: Chelicerata
- Class: Arachnida
- Order: Araneae
- Infraorder: Araneomorphae
- Family: Hahniidae
- Genus: Alistra
- Species: A. inanga

Binomial name
- Alistra inanga (Forster, 1970)

Synonyms
- Tawerana inanga

Species of spider

Alistra inanga is a species of Hahniidae spider endemic to New Zealand.

== Taxonomy ==
This species was described as Tawerana inanga in 1970 by Ray Forster from a female specimen. In 1986 it was transferred to the Alistra genus. The holotype is stored in Otago Museum.

== Description ==
The female is recorded at 2.06mm in length. The carapace has a black shading dorsally. The legs are pale yellow with some black bands. The abdomen has black markings dorsally.

== Distribution ==
This species is only known from Westland, New Zealand.

== Conservation status ==
Under the New Zealand Threat Classification System, this species is listed as "Data Deficient" with the qualifiers of "Data Poor: Size", "Data Poor: Trend" and "One Location".
