= Scotospilus divisus =

Conservation status
- Data Deficit (NZ TCS)

Scientific classification
- Kingdom: Animalia
- Phylum: Arthropoda
- Subphylum: Chelicerata
- Class: Arachnida
- Order: Araneae
- Infraorder: Araneomorphae
- Family: Hahniidae
- Genus: Scotospilus
- Species: S. divisus

Binomial name
- Scotospilus divisus (Forster, 1970)

Synonyms
- Tuana divisa

Species of spider

Scotospilus divisus is a species of Hahniidae spider endemic to New Zealand.

== Taxonomy ==
This species was described as Tuana divisa by Ray Forster in 1970 from a female specimen. In 1986, Tuana was recognized as a synonym of Scotospilus, so the species name was changed to Scotospilus divisus. The holotype is stored in Otago Museum.

== Description ==
The female is recorded at 2.34mm in length. The carapace is yellowish brown with grey shading. The legs are yellow brown. The abdomen is yellow brown with a chevron pattern dorsally.

== Distribution ==
This species is only known from Otago, New Zealand.

== Conservation status ==
Under the New Zealand Threat Classification System, this species is listed as "Data Deficient" with the qualifiers of "Data Poor: Size" and "Data Poor: Trend".
