= Porioides rima =

Conservation status
- Data Deficit (NZ TCS)

Scientific classification
- Kingdom: Animalia
- Phylum: Arthropoda
- Subphylum: Chelicerata
- Class: Arachnida
- Order: Araneae
- Infraorder: Araneomorphae
- Family: Hahniidae
- Genus: Porioides
- Species: P. rima

Binomial name
- Porioides rima (Forster, 1970)

Synonyms
- Poria rima

Species of spider

Porioides rima is a species of Hahniidae spider endemic to New Zealand.

== Taxonomy ==
This species was described as Poria rima by Ray Forster in 1970 from male and female specimens. It was renamed as Porioides rima in 1989. The holotype is stored in Canterbury Museum.

== Description ==
The male is recorded at 1.36mm in length whereas the female is 1.52mm. The carapace is orange. The abdomen is grey with a pattern dorsally.

== Distribution ==
This species is only known from Fiordland, New Zealand.

== Conservation status ==
Under the New Zealand Threat Classification System, this species is listed as "Data Deficient" with the qualifiers of "Data Poor: Size" and "Data Poor: Trend".
