= Alistra centralis =

Conservation status
- Naturally Uncommon (NZ TCS)

Scientific classification
- Kingdom: Animalia
- Phylum: Arthropoda
- Subphylum: Chelicerata
- Class: Arachnida
- Order: Araneae
- Infraorder: Araneomorphae
- Family: Hahniidae
- Genus: Alistra
- Species: A. centralis

Binomial name
- Alistra centralis (Forster, 1970)

Synonyms
- Tawerana centralis

Species of spider

Alistra centralis is a species of Hahniidae spider endemic to New Zealand.

== Taxonomy ==
This species was described as Tawerana centralis in 1970 by Ray Forster from female specimens. In 1986 it was transferred to the Alistra genus. The holotype is stored in Otago Museum.

== Description ==
The female is recorded at 1.64mm in length. This species is overall reddish brown in life.

== Distribution ==
This species is only known from Otago, New Zealand.

== Conservation status ==
Under the New Zealand Threat Classification System, this species is listed as "Naturally Uncommon" with the qualifiers of "Data Poor: Size" and "Data Poor: Trend".
