= Alistra taprobanica =

Scientific classification
- Kingdom: Animalia
- Phylum: Arthropoda
- Subphylum: Chelicerata
- Class: Arachnida
- Order: Araneae
- Infraorder: Araneomorphae
- Family: Hahniidae
- Genus: Alistra
- Species: A. taprobanica

Binomial name
- Alistra taprobanica (Simon, 1898)

Species of spider

Alistra taprobanica is a species of spider of the genus Alistra. It is endemic to Sri Lanka, described by Eugène Simon in 1898.

The species name “taprobanica” refers to Taprobane, an ancient Greek name for the island of Sri Lanka.

== Habitat and Characteristics ==
Spiders in the Hahniidae family are generally very small, often just a few millimeters in length.

They are known for building small, flat, sheet-like webs, often close to the ground, in leaf litter, moss, under stones, or in damp environments.

A distinctive feature of Hahniidae spiders is that their spinnerets are arranged in a single, transverse line at the rear of their abdomen, rather than in a cluster. This is a key identifying characteristic for the family.

They are typically ground-dwelling and are active hunters, using their small webs to trap tiny invertebrates.
