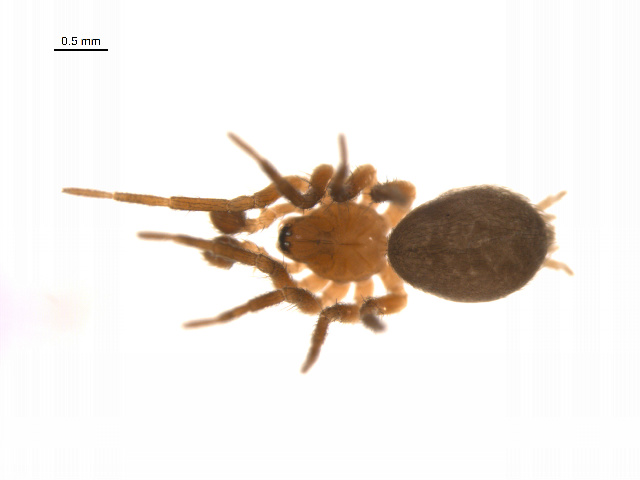
- H. glacialis, adult male
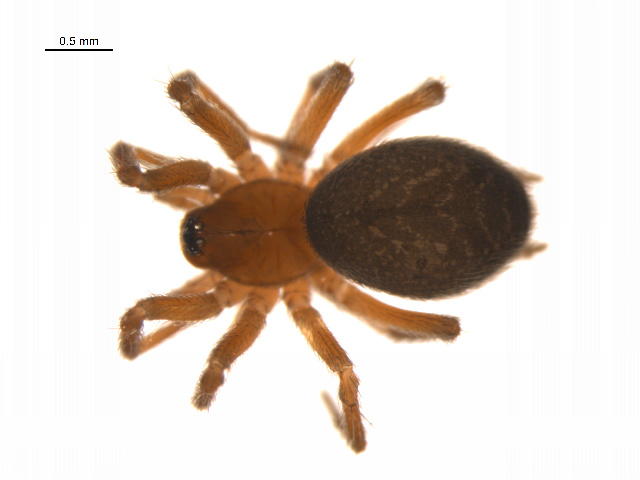
- H. glacialis, adult female

Scientific classification
- Domain: Eukaryota
- Kingdom: Animalia
- Phylum: Arthropoda
- Subphylum: Chelicerata
- Class: Arachnida
- Order: Araneae
- Infraorder: Araneomorphae
- Family: Hahniidae
- Genus: Hahnia
- Species: H. glacialis

Binomial name
- Hahnia glacialis Sorensen, 1898

= Hahnia glacialis =

Species of spider

Hahnia glacialis is a species of true spider in the family Hahniidae. It is found in Russia (Siberia) and North America.
