= Scotospilus nelsonensis =

Conservation status
- Data Deficit (NZ TCS)

Scientific classification
- Kingdom: Animalia
- Phylum: Arthropoda
- Subphylum: Chelicerata
- Class: Arachnida
- Order: Araneae
- Infraorder: Araneomorphae
- Family: Hahniidae
- Genus: Scotospilus
- Species: S. nelsonensis

Binomial name
- Scotospilus nelsonensis (Forster, 1970)

Synonyms
- Tuana nelsonensis

Species of spider

Scotospilus nelsonensis is a species of Hahniidae spider endemic to New Zealand.

== Taxonomy ==
This species was described as Tuana nelsonensis by Ray Forster in 1970 from male and female specimens. In 1986, Tuana was recognized as a synonym of Scotospilus, so the species name was changed to Scotospilus nelsonensis. The holotype is stored in Otago Museum.

== Description ==
The male is recorded at 1.90mm in length whereas the female is 2.37mm. The carapace is darkly coloured with black markings dorsally. The legs are pale brown with dark markings. The abdomen is blackish with pale chevron pattern dorsally.

== Distribution ==
This species is only known from Nelson, New Zealand.

== Conservation status ==
Under the New Zealand Threat Classification System, this species is listed as "Data Deficient" with the qualifiers of "Data Poor: Size", "Data Poor: Trend" and "One Location".
