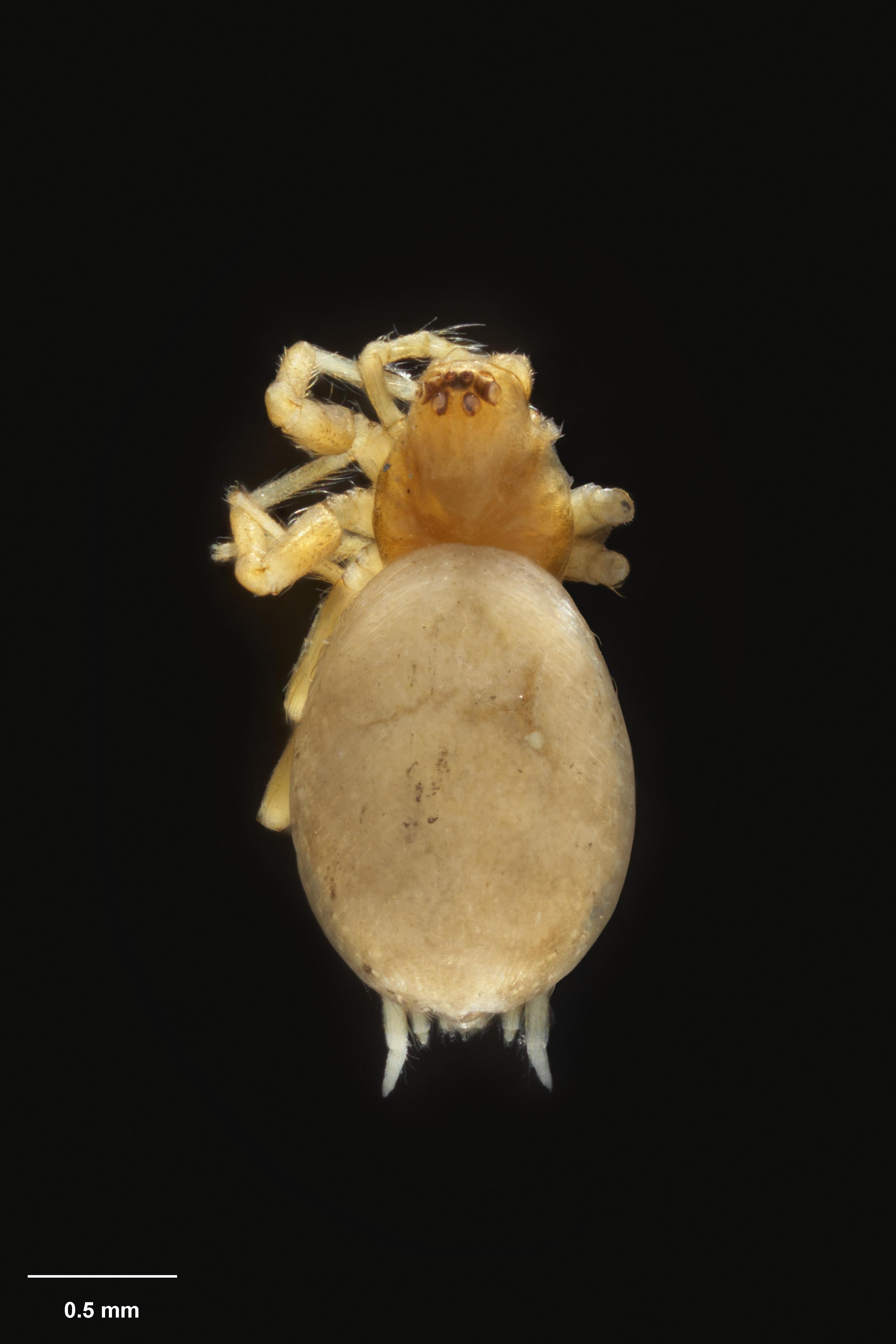

Conservation status
- Data Deficient (NZ TCS)

Scientific classification
- Kingdom: Animalia
- Phylum: Arthropoda
- Subphylum: Chelicerata
- Class: Arachnida
- Order: Araneae
- Infraorder: Araneomorphae
- Family: Hahniidae
- Genus: Alistra
- Species: A. opina

Binomial name
- Alistra opina (Forster, 1970)

Synonyms
- Tawerana opina Forster, 1970

= Alistra opina =

Species of spider

Alistra opina is a species of dwarf sheet spider of the genus Alistra. This species is endemic to New Zealand.

== Taxonomy ==
This species was first described from a single female by Ray Forster in 1970, originally named Tawerana opina. It was transferred into the Alistra genus in 1986. The holotype specimen was collected by Richard Dell and Beverley Holloway at Crooked Reach, Port Pegasus on Stewart Island, during the 1955 Dominion Museum expedition.

The holotype is stored at Te Papa under the registration number AS.000078.

== Description ==
The body is around 2.4 mm (0.094 in) long. The carapace, legs and chelicerae are yellow. The abdomen is cream coloured.

== Distribution ==
This species is only recorded from Port Pegasus on Stewart Island in New Zealand.

== Conservation status ==
Under the New Zealand Threat Classification System, this species is listed as Data Deficient with the qualifiers of "Data Poor: Size", "Data Poor: Trend" and "One Location".
