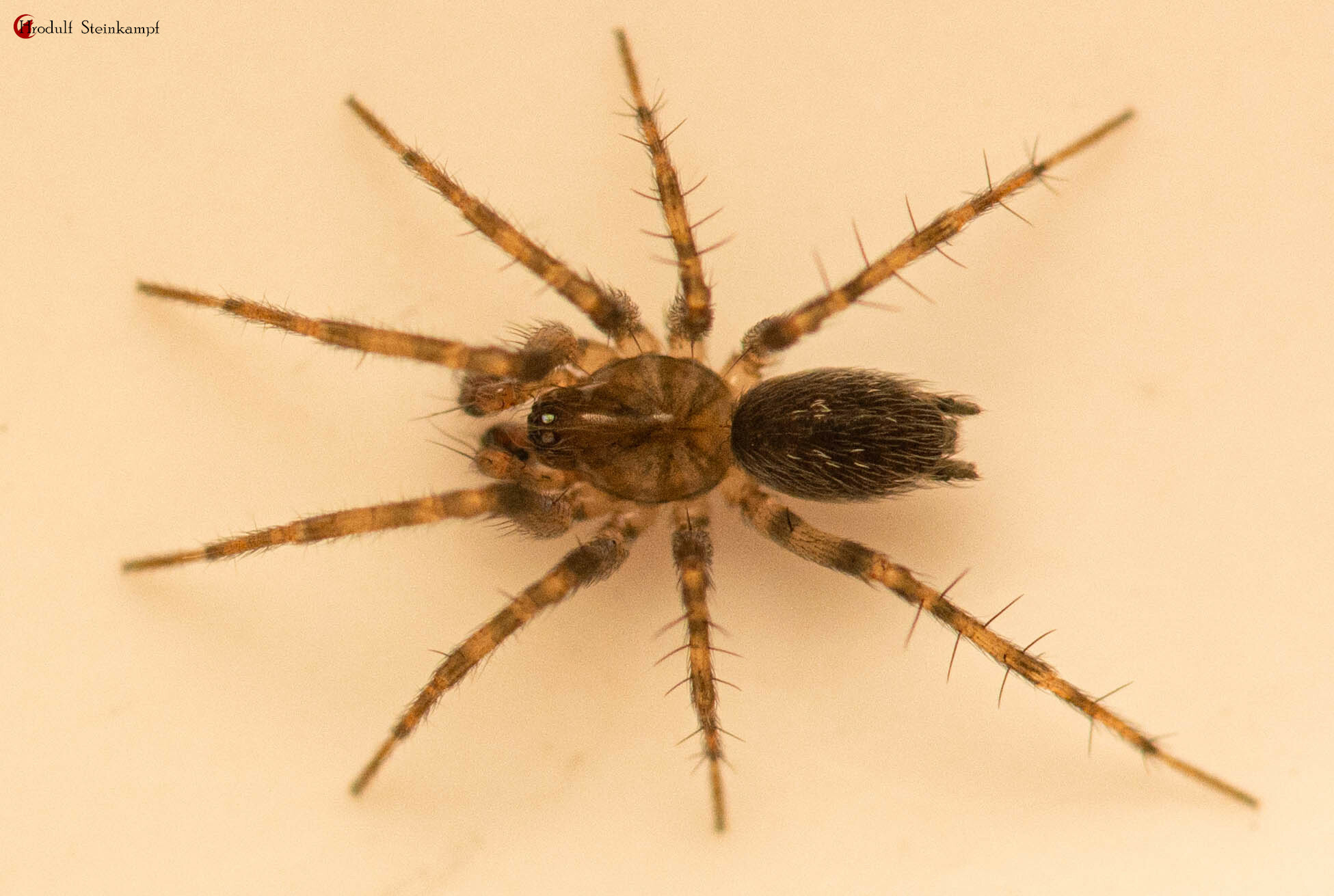
- male
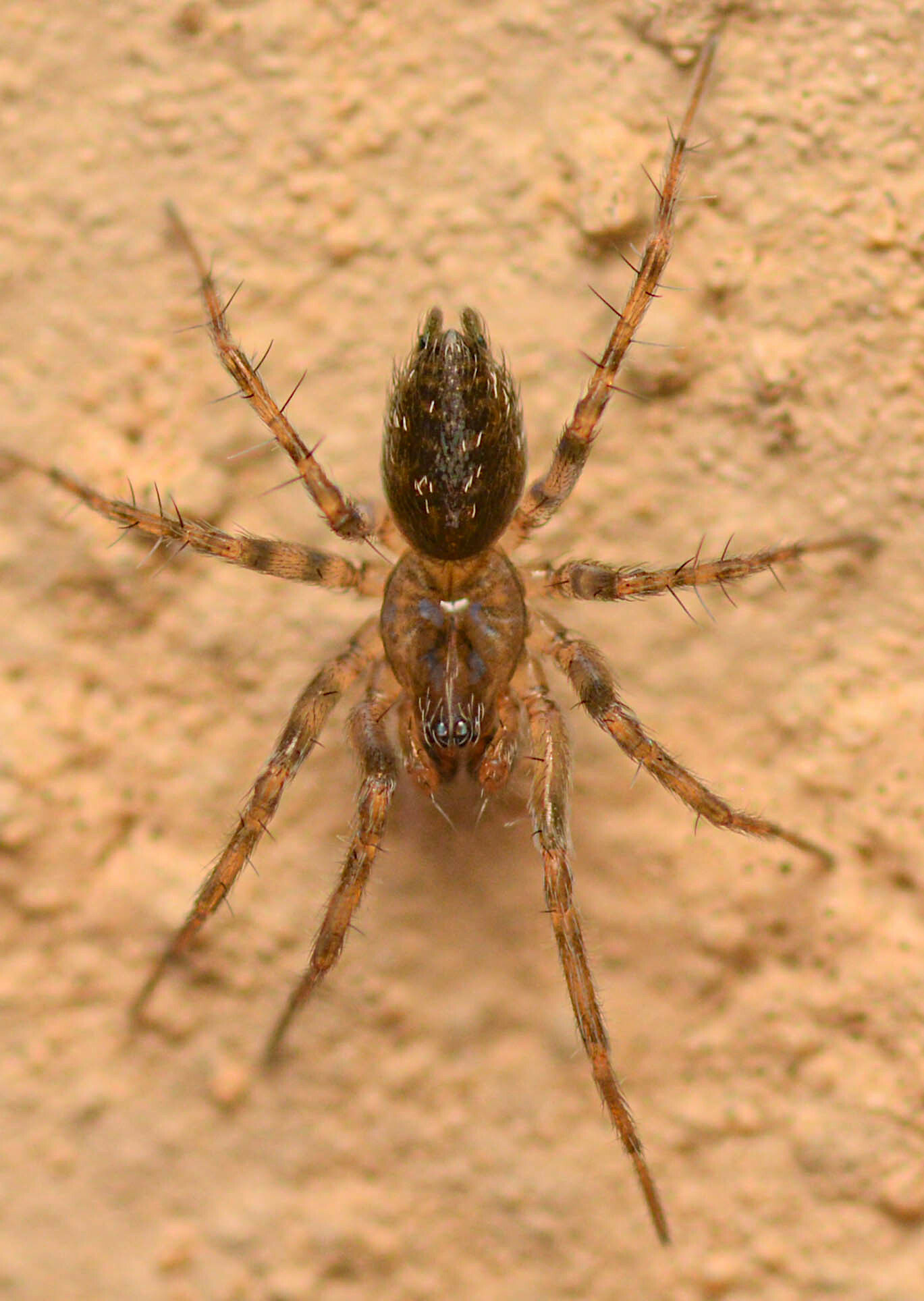
- male

Scientific classification
- Kingdom: Animalia
- Phylum: Arthropoda
- Subphylum: Chelicerata
- Class: Arachnida
- Order: Araneae
- Infraorder: Araneomorphae
- Family: Hahniidae
- Genus: Hahnia
- Species: H. tabulicola

Binomial name
- Hahnia tabulicola Simon, 1898

Synonyms
- Hahnia rouleti annulata Lessert, 1915; Hahnia annulata Roewer, 1955; Hahnia tubicola Roewer, 1955 (lapsus)

= Hahnia tabulicola =

Common Comb-Tailed Spider

Species of spider

Hahnia tabulicola is a species of spider in the family Hahniidae. It is found in several African countries and is commonly known as the common comb-tailed spider.

== Distribution ==
Hahnia tabulicola is an African endemic recorded from Botswana, Cameroon, Democratic Republic of the Congo, Kenya, Malawi, Tanzania, and South Africa. The species is commonly found throughout South Africa, where it has been recorded from seven provinces at elevations ranging from 4 to 2892 m above sea level. It is found in more than 10 protected areas.

== Habitat and ecology ==
The species makes small sheet-webs in litter and has been collected using pitfall traps. It has been sampled from all the floral biomes except the Thicket and Desert biomes. It has also been sampled from cotton and maize.

== Description ==
Hahnia tabulicola is known from both sexes.

== Conservation ==
Hahnia tabulicola is listed as Least Concern by the South African National Biodiversity Institute due to its wide distribution range. The species is protected in numerous areas including De Hoop Nature Reserve, Asante Sana Private Game Reserve, Cederberg Wilderness Area, Witteberg Nature Reserve, and Table Mountain National Park.

== Taxonomy ==
The species was originally described by Eugène Simon in 1898 from South Africa with the type locality as "Prom. Bonae Spei" (Cape of Good Hope). It was revised by Robert Bosmans in 1981, who synonymized Hahnia annulata.
