= Hahnia laticeps =

Simonstown Comb-Tailed Spider

Conservation status
- Least Concern (SANBI Red List)

Scientific classification
- Kingdom: Animalia
- Phylum: Arthropoda
- Subphylum: Chelicerata
- Class: Arachnida
- Order: Araneae
- Infraorder: Araneomorphae
- Family: Hahniidae
- Genus: Hahnia
- Species: H. laticeps

Binomial name
- Hahnia laticeps Simon, 1898

Species of spider

Hahnia laticeps is a species of spider in the family Hahniidae. It is endemic to South Africa and is commonly known as the Simonstown comb-tailed spider.

== Distribution ==
Hahnia laticeps is endemic to South Africa, known from three provinces: Eastern Cape, KwaZulu-Natal, and Western Cape. The species occurs at elevations ranging from 39 to 2,985 m above sea level. Numerous specimens were recently sampled on the Sani Pass in the Drakensberg.

== Habitat and ecology ==
The species makes small sheet-webs in litter in the Grassland and Fynbos biomes.

== Description ==
Hahnia laticeps is known only from the female.

== Conservation ==
Hahnia laticeps is listed as Least Concern by the South African National Biodiversity Institute due to its wide range. The species is protected in four protected areas.

== Taxonomy ==
The species was originally described by Eugène Simon in 1898 from Simon's Town in the Western Cape.
