= Rinawa =

Scientific classification
- Domain: Eukaryota
- Kingdom: Animalia
- Phylum: Arthropoda
- Subphylum: Chelicerata
- Class: Arachnida
- Order: Araneae
- Infraorder: Araneomorphae
- Family: Hahniidae
- Genus: Rinawa; Forster, 1970

Type species
- R. otagoensis Forster, 1970

Species
- 4, see text

Genus of spiders

Rinawa is a genus of South Pacific dwarf sheet spiders that was first described by Raymond Robert Forster in 1970.

== Species ==
As of May 2019 it contains four species, all found in New Zealand:

- Rinawa bola Forster, 1970 – New Zealand
- Rinawa cantuaria Forster, 1970 – New Zealand
- Rinawa otagoensis Forster, 1970 (type) – New Zealand
- Rinawa pula Forster, 1970 – New Zealand
