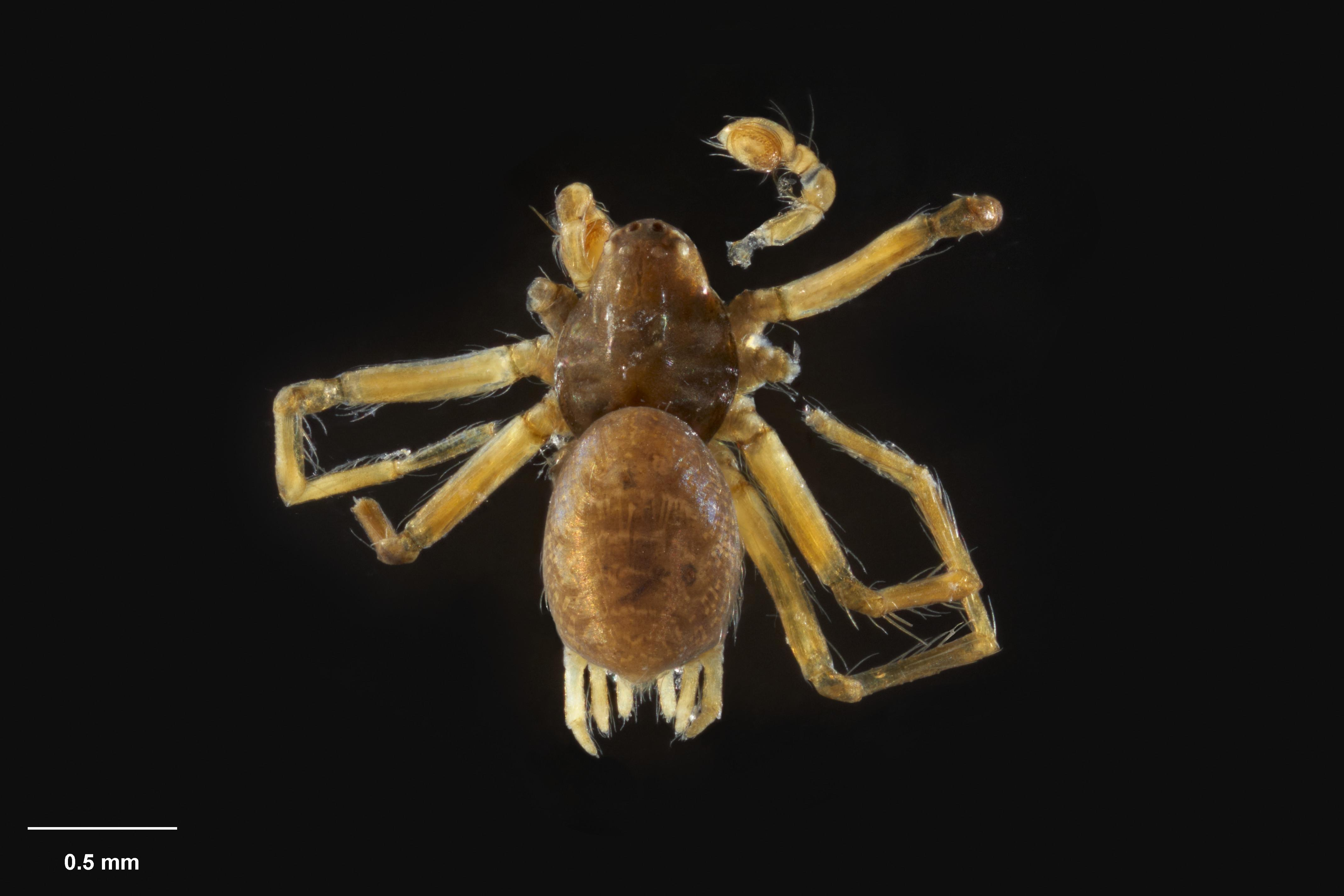

Conservation status
- Data Deficit (NZ TCS)

Scientific classification
- Kingdom: Animalia
- Phylum: Arthropoda
- Subphylum: Chelicerata
- Class: Arachnida
- Order: Araneae
- Infraorder: Araneomorphae
- Family: Hahniidae
- Genus: Scotospilus
- Species: S. plenus

Binomial name
- Scotospilus plenus (Forster, 1970)

Synonyms
- Tuana plena

= Scotospilus plenus =

Species of spider

Scotospilus plenus is a species of Hahniidae spider endemic to New Zealand.

== Taxonomy ==
This species was described as Tuana plena by Ray Forster in 1970 from male and female specimens. In 1986, Tuana was recognized as a synonym of Scotospilus, so the species name was changed to Scotospilus plenus. The holotype is stored in Te Papa Museum under registration number AS.000089.

== Description ==
The male is recorded at 1.72mm in length whereas the female is 2mm. The carapace is dark brown. The legs are yellow brown. The abdomen is purplish with faint markings dorsally.

== Distribution ==
This species is only known from Westland, New Zealand.

== Conservation status ==
Under the New Zealand Threat Classification System, this species is listed as "Data Deficient" with the qualifiers of "Data Poor: Size", "Data Poor: Trend" and "One Location".
