= Lord River =

Lord River may refer to:

- Lord River (Canada), British Columbia
- Lord River (New Zealand), West Coast Region

== See also ==
- Lords River
- Lord of the River (disambiguation)
- Lord Rivers
