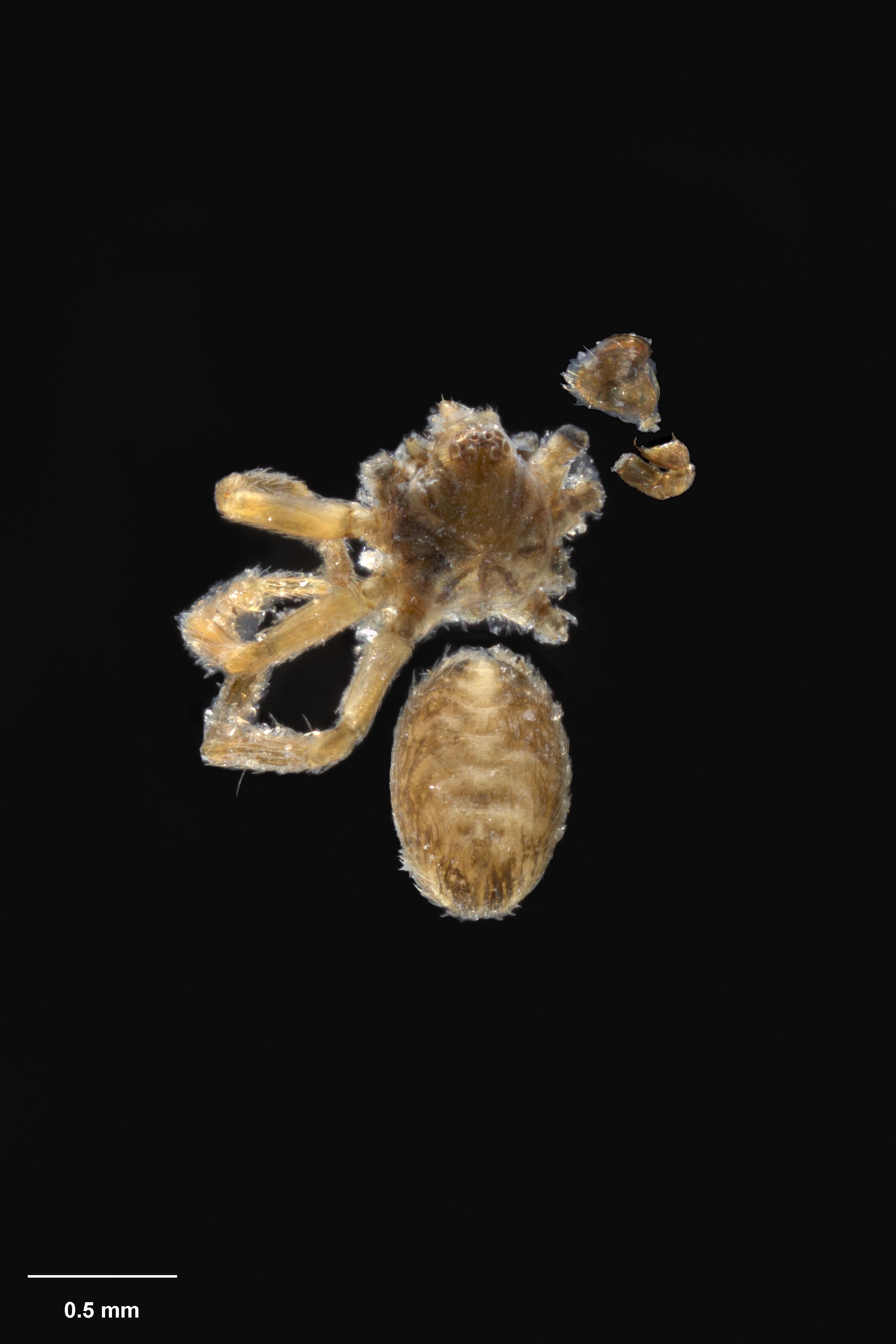

Conservation status
- Data Deficit (NZ TCS)

Scientific classification
- Kingdom: Animalia
- Phylum: Arthropoda
- Subphylum: Chelicerata
- Class: Arachnida
- Order: Araneae
- Infraorder: Araneomorphae
- Family: Hahniidae
- Genus: Kapanga
- Species: K. grana

Binomial name
- Kapanga grana Forster, 1970

= Kapanga grana =

Species of spider

Kapanga grana is a species of Dwarf sheet spider that is endemic to New Zealand

== Taxonomy ==
This species was first described from a single male specimen by Ray Forster in 1970. The holotype specimen was collected by Richard Dell and Beverley Holloway at Lords River, on Stewart Island, during the 1955 Dominion Museum expedition.

The holotype is stored at Te Papa under registration number AS.000031.

== Description ==
The body is around 1.6mm long. The carapace is coloured dark brown and has some black shading in the head and lateral regions. The abdomen has five indistinct chevrons on the dorsal surface.

== Distribution ==
Kapanga grana is only known from Stewart Island.

== Conservation status ==
Under the New Zealand Threat Classification System, this species is listed as Data Deficient with the qualifiers of "Data Poor: Size", "Data Poor: Trend" and "One Location".
