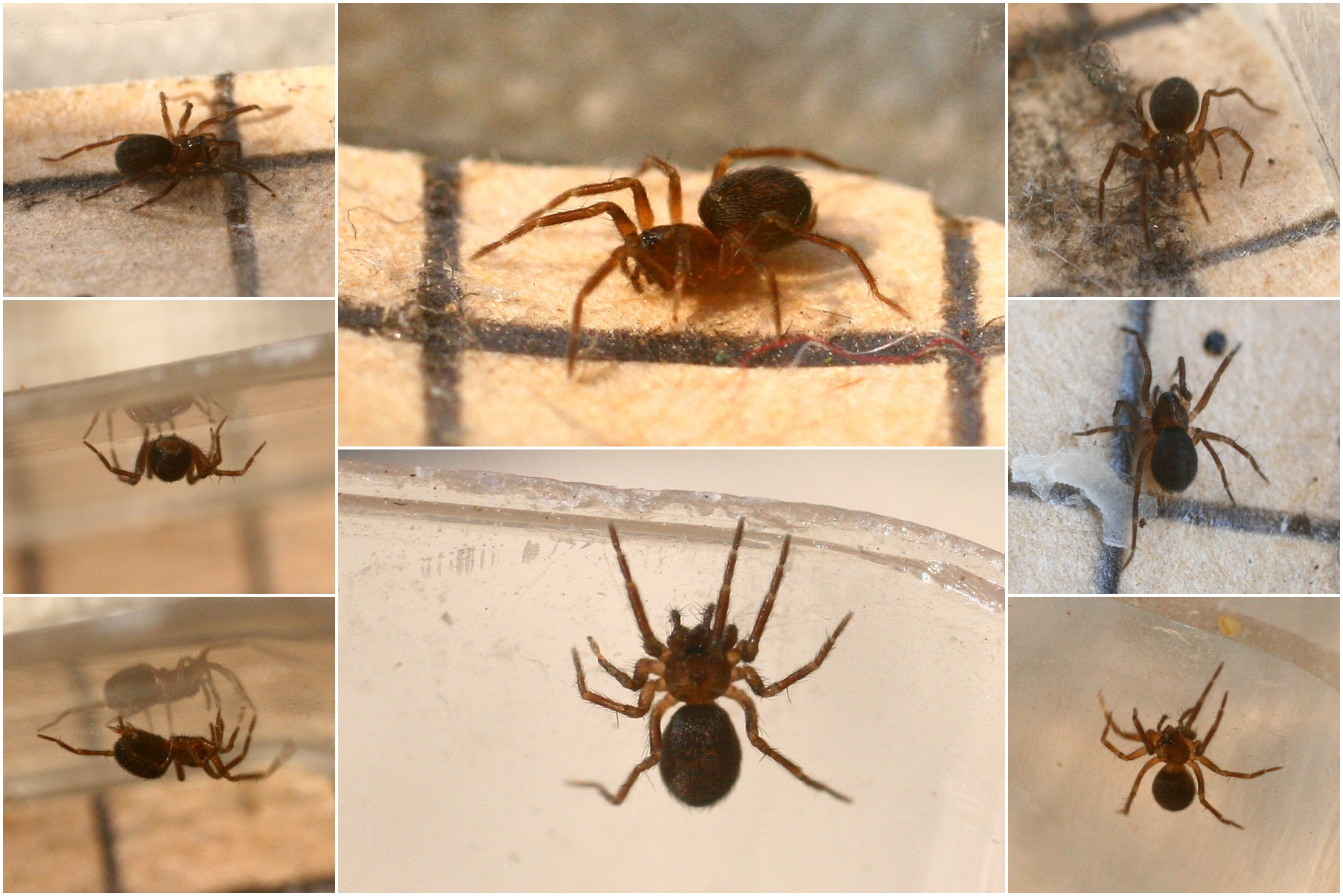

Scientific classification
- Kingdom: Animalia
- Phylum: Arthropoda
- Subphylum: Chelicerata
- Class: Arachnida
- Order: Araneae
- Infraorder: Araneomorphae
- Family: Hahniidae
- Genus: Iberina
- Species: I. montana

Binomial name
- Iberina montana (Blackwall, 1841)

Synonyms
- Agelena montana Blackwall, 1841; Argus montanus (Blackwall, 1841); Hahnia montana (Blackwall, 1841); Hahnia parva Kulczyński, 1882; Hahnia cacuminata Bösenberg, 1902

= Iberina montana =

Species of spider

Iberina montana, the common combtailed spider, which was formerly better known as Hahnia montana, is a species of dwarf sheet spider, family Hahniidae, which is found mainly in Europe.

== Description ==
Iberina montana is a small spider with a body length of 1.4–2 mm. The palps on the male have 3 black bristles on the outer side of femur which break off easily, although the base is always still visible. The vulva has a small, median spermatheca with the distance between the primary spermathecae smaller than their width. The prosoma is yellowish, suffused with black, while the opisthosoma is dark with vague chevrons. Its body is quite densely covered with long pale hairs. The legs are yellow-brown with relatively strong spines.

== Biology ==
Female Iberina montana are mature throughout the year, but mature males are found only from late summer through autumn and winter, but mainly during the autumn. Its small sheet web is placed close to the ground among the mosses or under stones, or in leaf litter, including fallen pine needles, and among moss and other detritus, normally in woodlands.

== Habitat ==
Iberina montana is mainly found in woodland but it is occasionally recorded from other habitats such as grassland, heathland, fen, sand dunes and coastal shingle.

== Distribution ==
Iberina montana is found mainly in western and central Europe east to Russia but not as far as the Ural Mountains or the Caucasus. In a survey in the Eifel mountains of the Rhineland, this was the commonest hahnid spider encountered. Despite being so far unrecorded in European Turkey or adjacent parts of the Balkans, it has been recorded in Anatolia. In Great Britain it is a common species but it is included in the Red List for Sweden, where it is only found on Gotland and Öland.
