= Kapanga wiltoni =

Conservation status
- Not Threatened (NZ TCS)

Scientific classification
- Kingdom: Animalia
- Phylum: Arthropoda
- Subphylum: Chelicerata
- Class: Arachnida
- Order: Araneae
- Infraorder: Araneomorphae
- Family: Hahniidae
- Genus: Kapanga
- Species: K. wiltoni

Binomial name
- Kapanga wiltoni Forster, 1970

Species of spider

Kapanga wiltoni is a species of Hahniidae spider endemic to New Zealand.

== Taxonomy ==
This species was described in 1970 by Ray Forster from male and female specimens. It is the type species of Kapanga. The holotype is stored in Otago Museum.

== Description ==
The male is recorded at 1.62mm in length whereas the female is 1.95mm.

== Distribution ==
This species is only known from Otago, New Zealand.

== Conservation status ==
Under the New Zealand Threat Classification System, this species is listed as "Not Threatened".
