= Kapanga isulata =

Conservation status
- Data Deficit (NZ TCS)

Scientific classification
- Kingdom: Animalia
- Phylum: Arthropoda
- Subphylum: Chelicerata
- Class: Arachnida
- Order: Araneae
- Infraorder: Araneomorphae
- Family: Hahniidae
- Genus: Kapanga
- Species: K. isulata

Binomial name
- Kapanga isulata (Forster, 1970)

Synonyms
- Tuata isulata

Species of spider

Kapanga isulata is a species of Hahniidae spider endemic to New Zealand.

== Taxonomy ==
This species was described as Tuata isulata in 1970 by Ray Forster from female specimens. In 1986 it was moved to the Kapanga genus. The holotype is stored in Otago Museum.

== Description ==
The female is recorded at 2.38mm in length. The carapace is orange brown. The legs are yellow brown with dark markings. The abdomen has a chevron pattern dorsally.

== Distribution ==
This species is only known from Southland, New Zealand.

== Conservation status ==
Under the New Zealand Threat Classification System, this species is listed as "Data Deficient" with the qualifiers of "Data Poor: Size", "Data Poor: Trend" and "One Location".
