= Goblinia =

Scientific classification
- Kingdom: Animalia
- Phylum: Arthropoda
- Subphylum: Chelicerata
- Class: Arachnida
- Order: Araneae
- Infraorder: Araneomorphae
- Family: Hahniidae
- Genus: Goblinia; Lin & Li, 2023
- Species: G. tiane

Binomial name
- Goblinia tiane Lin & Li, 2023

Species of spider

Goblinia is a monotypic genus of spiders in the family Hahniidae, containing the single species Goblinia tiane.

== Distribution ==
Goblinia tiane has only been recorded from Tian'e County, Guangxi province in China.

== Etymology ==
The genus name is "a combination of goblin (a legendary creature that lives underground) and Hahnia.

The species is named after the type locality 天峨; Tiān'é.

== Taxonomy ==
The genus can be distinguished from Iberina by the anatomy of sexual organs.
