= Kapanga solitaria =

Conservation status
- Data Deficient (NZ TCS)

Scientific classification
- Domain: Eukaryota
- Kingdom: Animalia
- Phylum: Arthropoda
- Subphylum: Chelicerata
- Class: Arachnida
- Order: Araneae
- Infraorder: Araneomorphae
- Family: Hahniidae
- Genus: Kapanga
- Species: K. solitaria

Binomial name
- Kapanga solitaria (Bryant, 1935)

Synonyms
- Hahnia solitaria

Species of spider

Kapanga solitaria is a species of Hahniidae spider endemic to New Zealand.

== Taxonomy ==
This species was described as Hahnia solitaria by Elizabeth Bryant in 1935 from female specimens. It was moved to the Kapanga genus in 1970. The holotype is stored in Canterbury Museum.

== Description ==
The female is recorded at 1.86mm in length. The carapace is orange brown. The abdomen has a chevron pattern dorsally.

== Distribution ==
This species is only known from Canterbury, New Zealand.

== Conservation status ==
Under the New Zealand Threat Classification System, this species is listed as "Data Deficient" with the qualifiers of "Data Poor: Size" and "Data Poor: Trend".
