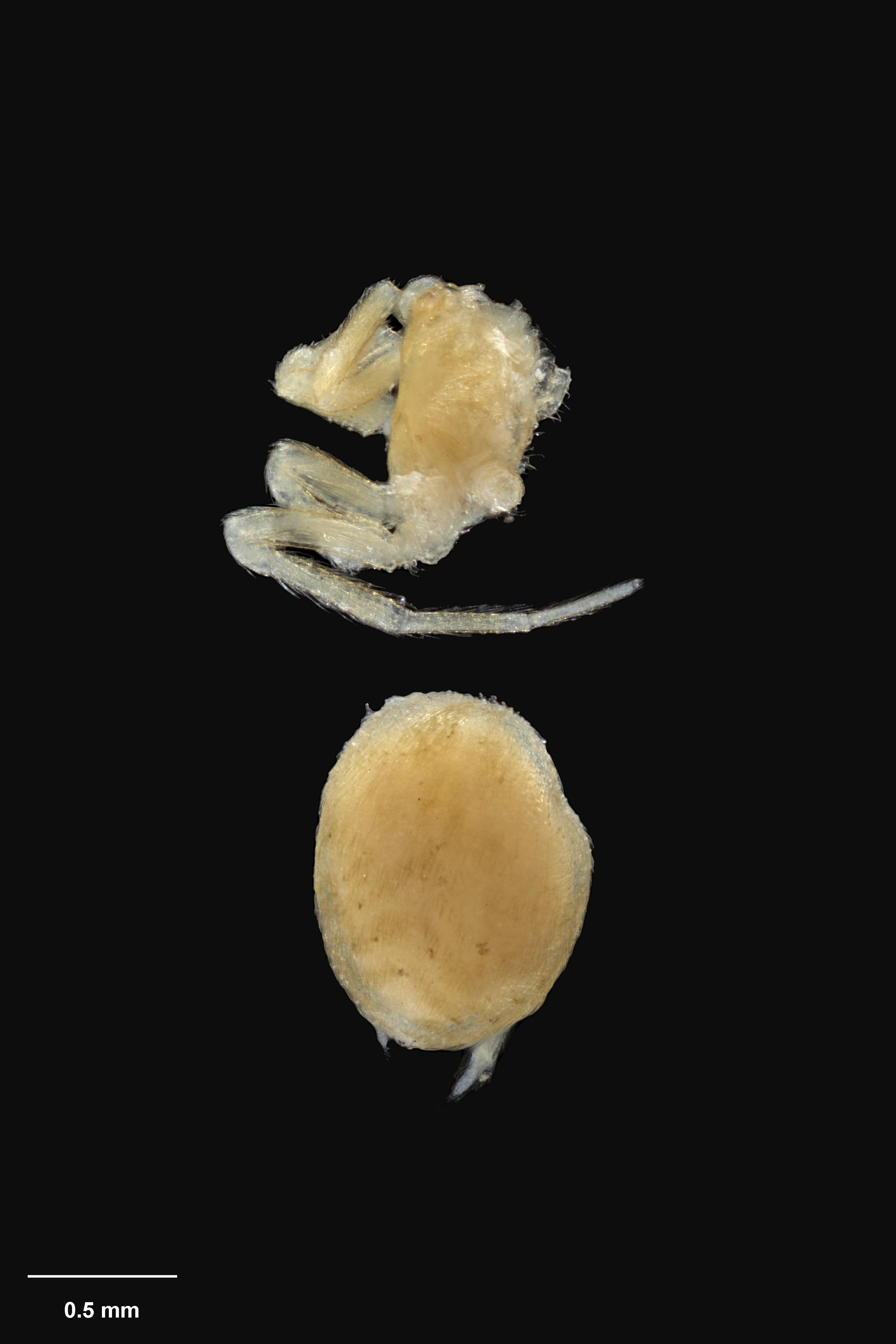

Conservation status
- Naturally Uncommon (NZ TCS)

Scientific classification
- Kingdom: Animalia
- Phylum: Arthropoda
- Subphylum: Chelicerata
- Class: Arachnida
- Order: Araneae
- Infraorder: Araneomorphae
- Family: Hahniidae
- Genus: Kapanga
- Species: K. hickmani

Binomial name
- Kapanga hickmani (Forster, 1964)

= Kapanga hickmani =

Species of spider

Kapanga hickmani is a species of Hahniidae spider endemic to New Zealand.

== Taxonomy ==
This species was described as Hahnia hickmani in 1964 by Ray Forster from female specimens. It was most recently revised in 1970. The holotype is stored in Te Papa Museum under registration number AS.000038.

== Description ==
The female is recorded at 1.78mm in length. The carapace is pale coloured. The legs are light brown. The abdomen has a chevron dorsally.

== Distribution ==
This species is only known from Auckland Island, New Zealand.

== Conservation status ==
Under the New Zealand Threat Classification System, this species is listed as "Naturally Uncommon" with the qualifiers of "One Location" and "Range Restricted".
