= Kapanga festiva =

Conservation status
- Data Deficit (NZ TCS)

Scientific classification
- Kingdom: Animalia
- Phylum: Arthropoda
- Subphylum: Chelicerata
- Class: Arachnida
- Order: Araneae
- Infraorder: Araneomorphae
- Family: Hahniidae
- Genus: Kapanga
- Species: K. festiva

Binomial name
- Kapanga festiva Forster, 1970

Species of spider

Kapanga festiva is a species of Hahniidae spider endemic to New Zealand.

== Taxonomy ==
This species was described in 1970 by Ray Forster from male and female specimens. The holotype is stored in Otago Museum.

== Description ==
The male is recorded at 1.38mm in length whereas the female is 1.67mm. This species has an orange brown carapace with dark patches dorsally. The legs are yellow brown. The abdomen has dark markings dorsally.

== Distribution ==
This species is only known from Wairarapa, New Zealand.

== Conservation status ==
Under the New Zealand Threat Classification System, this species is listed as "Data Deficient" with the qualifiers of "Data Poor: Size", "Data Poor: Trend" and "One Location".
