= Myahnia =

Scientific classification
- Kingdom: Animalia
- Phylum: Arthropoda
- Subphylum: Chelicerata
- Class: Arachnida
- Order: Araneae
- Infraorder: Araneomorphae
- Family: Hahniidae
- Genus: Myahnia; Lin & Li, 2023
- Species: M. kanpetlet

Binomial name
- Myahnia kanpetlet Lin & Li, 2023

Species of spider

Myahnia is a monotypic genus of spiders in the family Hahniidae containing the single species, Myahnia kanpetlet.

== Distribution ==
Myahnia kanpetlet is endemic to Myanmar.

== Etymology ==
The genus name is a combination of Myanmar and Hahnia.

The specific name refers to the type locality Kanpetlet in West Myanmar.

== Taxonomy ==
Myahnia can be distinguished from Hexamatia by its larger size and differences in male palpal structure.
