= Kapanga manga =

Conservation status
- Data Deficit (NZ TCS)

Scientific classification
- Kingdom: Animalia
- Phylum: Arthropoda
- Subphylum: Chelicerata
- Class: Arachnida
- Order: Araneae
- Infraorder: Araneomorphae
- Family: Hahniidae
- Genus: Kapanga
- Species: K. manga

Binomial name
- Kapanga manga Forster, 1970

Species of spider

Kapanga manga is a species of Hahniidae spider endemic to New Zealand.

== Taxonomy ==
This species was described in 1970 by Ray Forster from a female specimen. The holotype is stored in Otago Museum.

== Description ==
The female is recorded at 1.91mm in length. The cephalothorax has black markings dorsally. The abdomen has a dark chevron pattern dorsally.

== Distribution ==
This species is only known from Northland, New Zealand.

== Conservation status ==
Under the New Zealand Threat Classification System, this species is listed as "Data Deficient" with the qualifiers of "Data Poor: Size", "Data Poor: Trend" and "One Location".
