= Pristirana =

Scientific classification
- Kingdom: Animalia
- Phylum: Arthropoda
- Subphylum: Chelicerata
- Class: Arachnida
- Order: Araneae
- Infraorder: Araneomorphae
- Family: Hahniidae
- Subfamily: Hahniinae
- Genus: Pristirana; Dupérré & Tapia, 2024

Type species
- P. niederi Dupérré & Tapia, 2024

Species
- 3, see text

Genus of spiders

Pristirana is a genus of spiders in the family Hahniidae.

== Distribution ==
All currently described species of the genus are endemic to Ecuador.

== Etymology ==
The genus is named after the Pristirana Biological Reserve in Cotopaxi province, where the type species is found.

The specific names honor German botanists Dr. Wilhelm Barthlott, Dr. Jürgen Nieder and Dr. Christoph Nowicki.

== Species ==
As of October 2025, this genus includes three species:

- Pristirana barthlotti Dupérré & Tapia, 2024 – Ecuador
- Pristirana niederi Dupérré & Tapia, 2024 – Ecuador (type species)
- Pristirana nowickii Dupérré & Tapia, 2024 – Ecuador
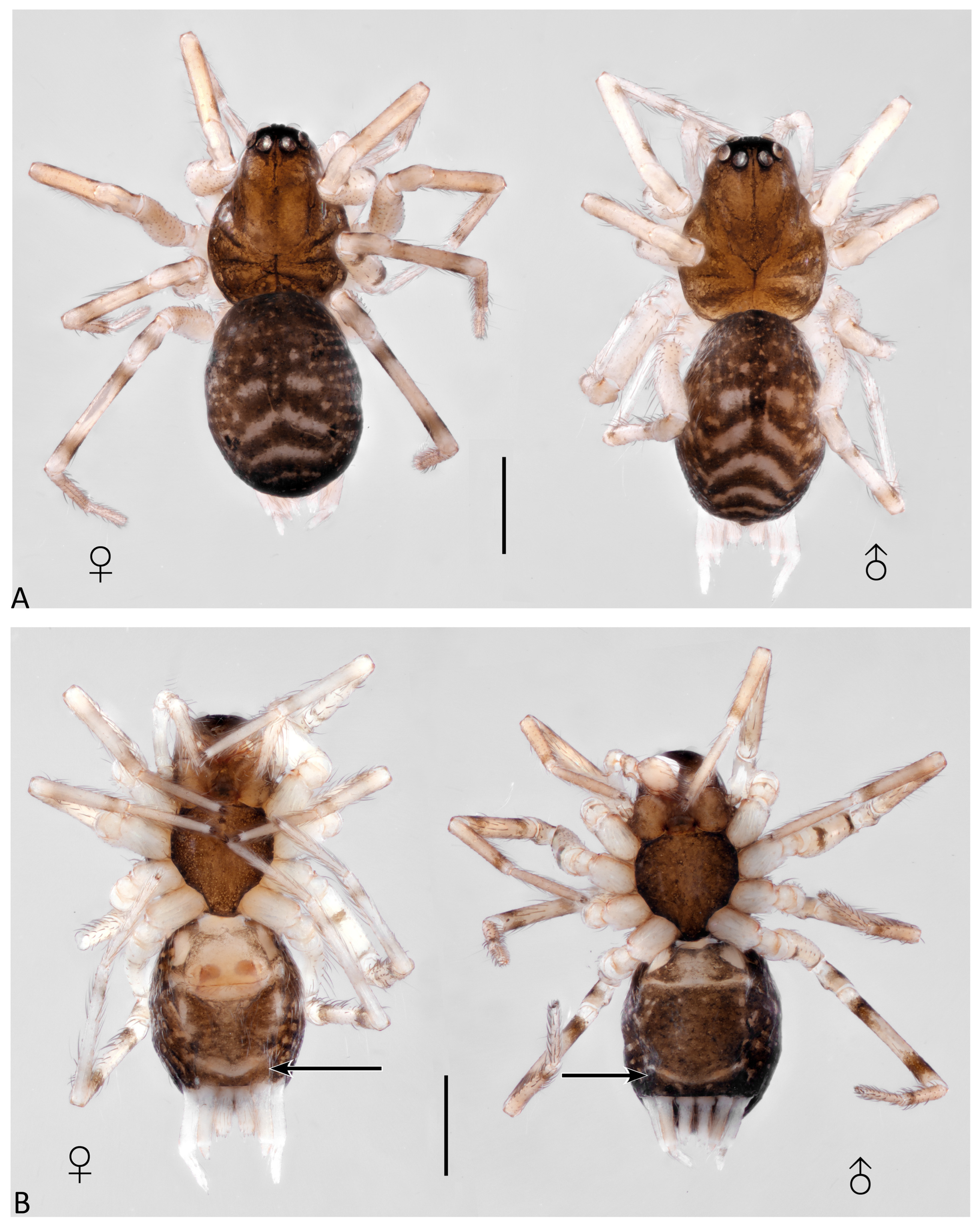
Diagnostic images of P. barthlotti

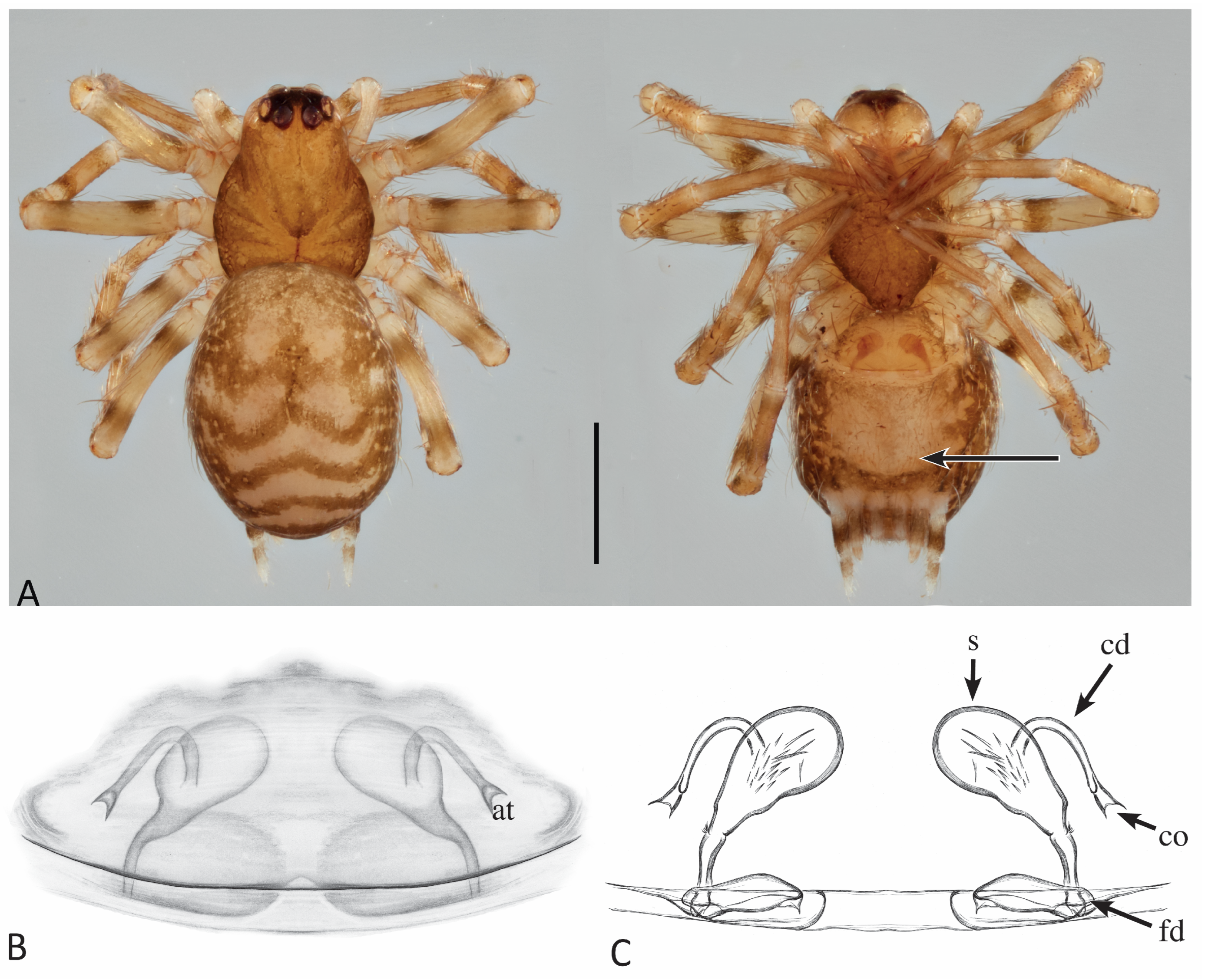
Diagnostic images of P. niederi

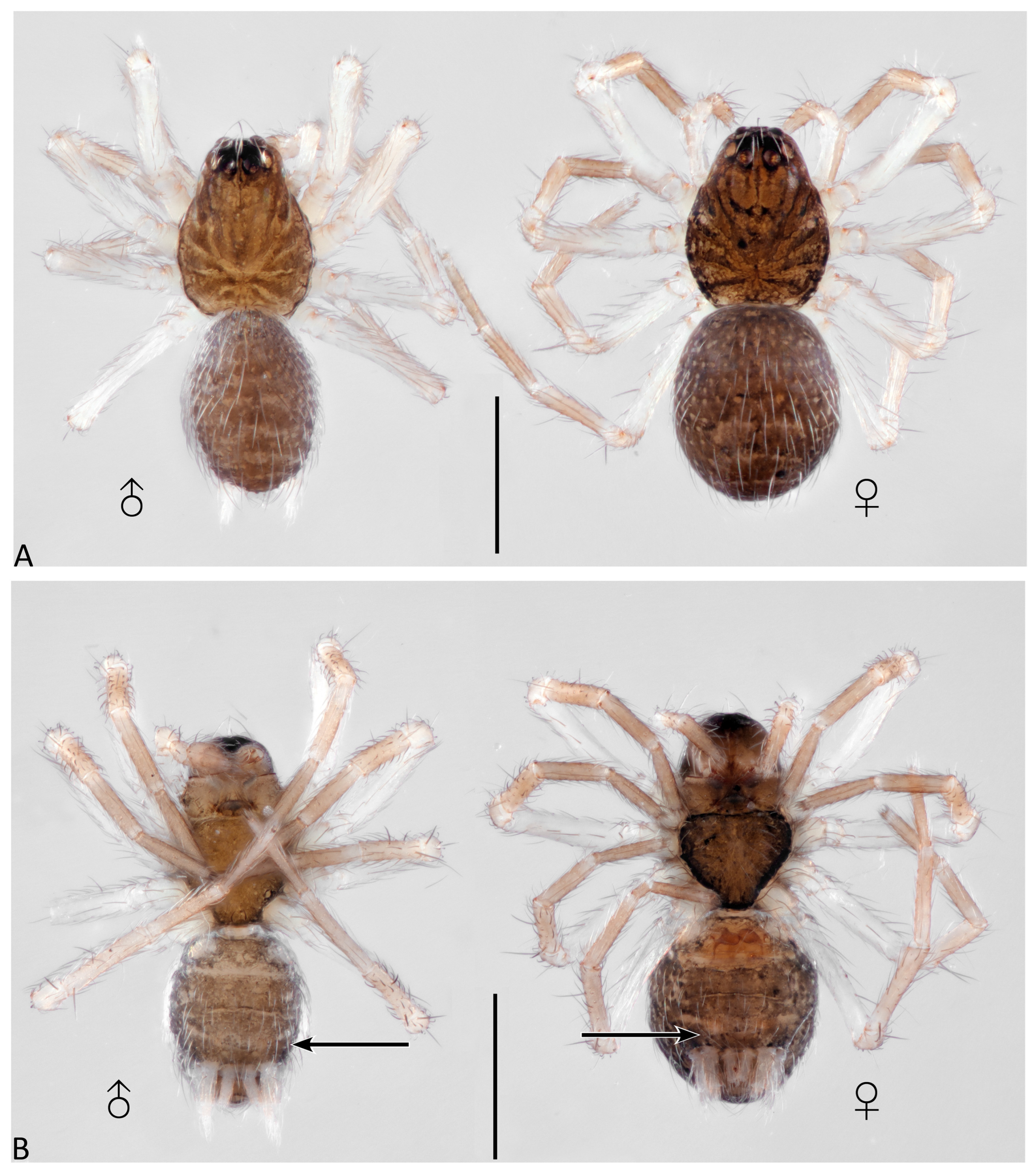
Diagnostic images of P. nowickii
