= Amaloxenops =

Scientific classification
- Domain: Eukaryota
- Kingdom: Animalia
- Phylum: Arthropoda
- Subphylum: Chelicerata
- Class: Arachnida
- Order: Araneae
- Infraorder: Araneomorphae
- Family: Hahniidae
- Genus: Amaloxenops; Schiapelli & Gerschman, 1958

Type species
- A. vianai Schiapelli & Gerschman, 1958

Species
- A. palmarum (Schiapelli & Gerschman, 1958) – Argentina; A. vianai Schiapelli & Gerschman, 1958 – Argentina

Genus of spiders

Amaloxenops is a genus of South American dwarf sheet spiders that was first described by R. D. Schiapelli & B. S. Gerschman de P. in 1958. As of May 2019 it contains only two species, both found in Argentina: A. palmarum and A. vianai.
