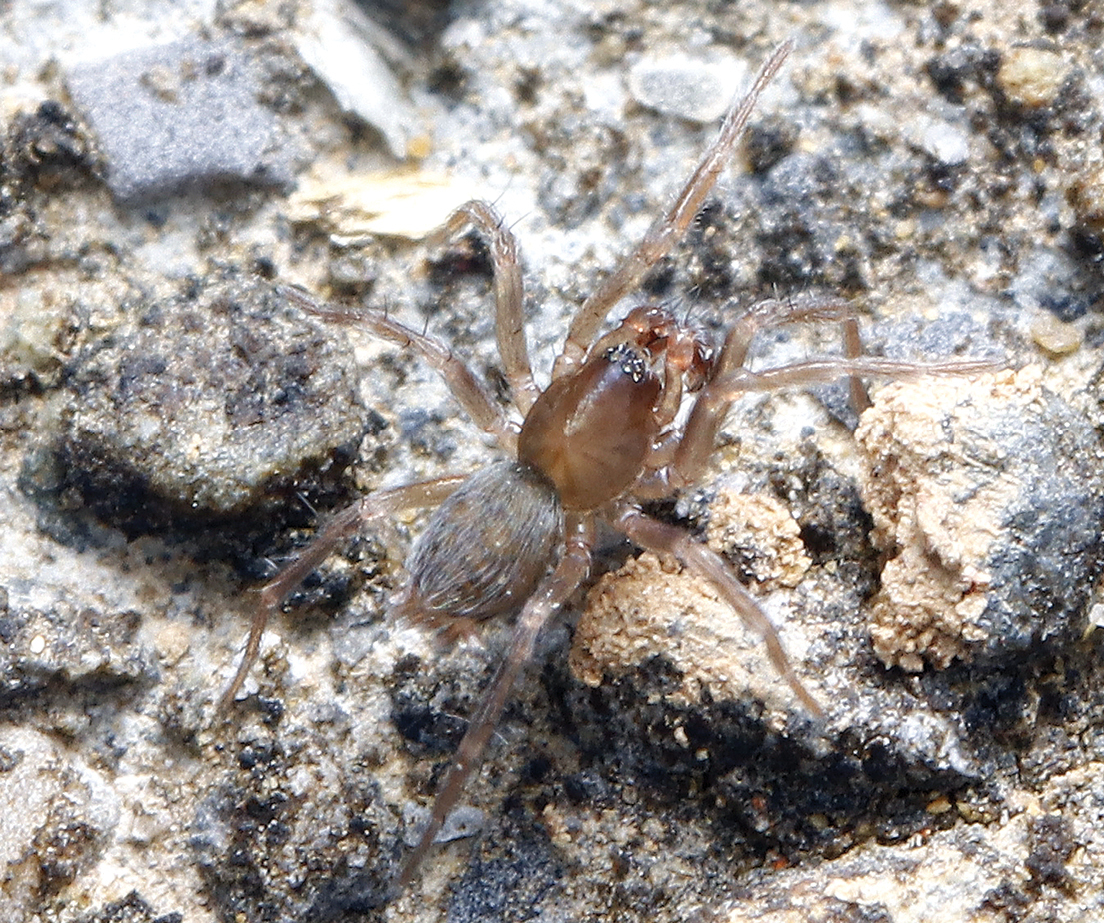
- Sinahahnia eyu, male

Scientific classification
- Domain: Eukaryota
- Kingdom: Animalia
- Phylum: Arthropoda
- Subphylum: Chelicerata
- Class: Arachnida
- Order: Araneae
- Infraorder: Araneomorphae
- Family: Hahniidae
- Genus: Sinahahnia; Wang & Zhang, 2024

Type species
- Sinahahnia eyu Wang & Zhang, 2024

Species
- Sinahahnia eyu (Wang & Zhang, 2024); Sinahahnia fanjingshan (Wang & Zhang, 2024); Sinahahnia yintiaoling (Wang & Zhang, 2024)

= Sinahahnia =

Genus of spiders

Sinahahnia is a genus of dwarf sheet spiders that was first described by Lu-Yu Wang and Zhi-Sheng Zhang in 2024. As of May 2024 it contains three species, all found in China in the Wuling Mountains.
