= Troglohnia =

Scientific classification
- Kingdom: Animalia
- Phylum: Arthropoda
- Subphylum: Chelicerata
- Class: Arachnida
- Order: Araneae
- Infraorder: Araneomorphae
- Family: Hahniidae
- Subfamily: Hahniinae
- Genus: Troglohnia; Lin & Li, 2023

Type species
- T. qiubei Lin & Li

Species
- 4, see text

Genus of spiders

Troglohnia is a genus of Chinese spiders in the family Hahniidae.

== Distribution ==
Troglohnia is endemic to Guizhou and Yunnan provinces of China.

== Life style ==
All described species were sampled from caves.

== Etymology ==
The genus name refers to its troglobiont (cave-dwelling) life style, combined with the ending of Hahnia.

The species are named after their respective type localities:

- T. dafang: 大方; Dàfāng, found in Dafang County, Guizhou province
- T. qiubei: 丘北; Qiūběi, found in Qiubei County, Yunnan province
- T. : 施甸; Shīdiàn, found in Shidian County, Yunnan province
- T. : 武定; Wǔdìng, found in Wuding County, Yunnan province

== Species ==
As of October 2025, this genus includes four species:

- Troglohnia dafang Lin & Li, 2023 – China
- Troglohnia qiubei Lin & Li, 2023 – China (type species)
- Troglohnia shidian Lin & Li, 2023 – China
- Troglohnia wuding Lin & Li, 2023 – China
