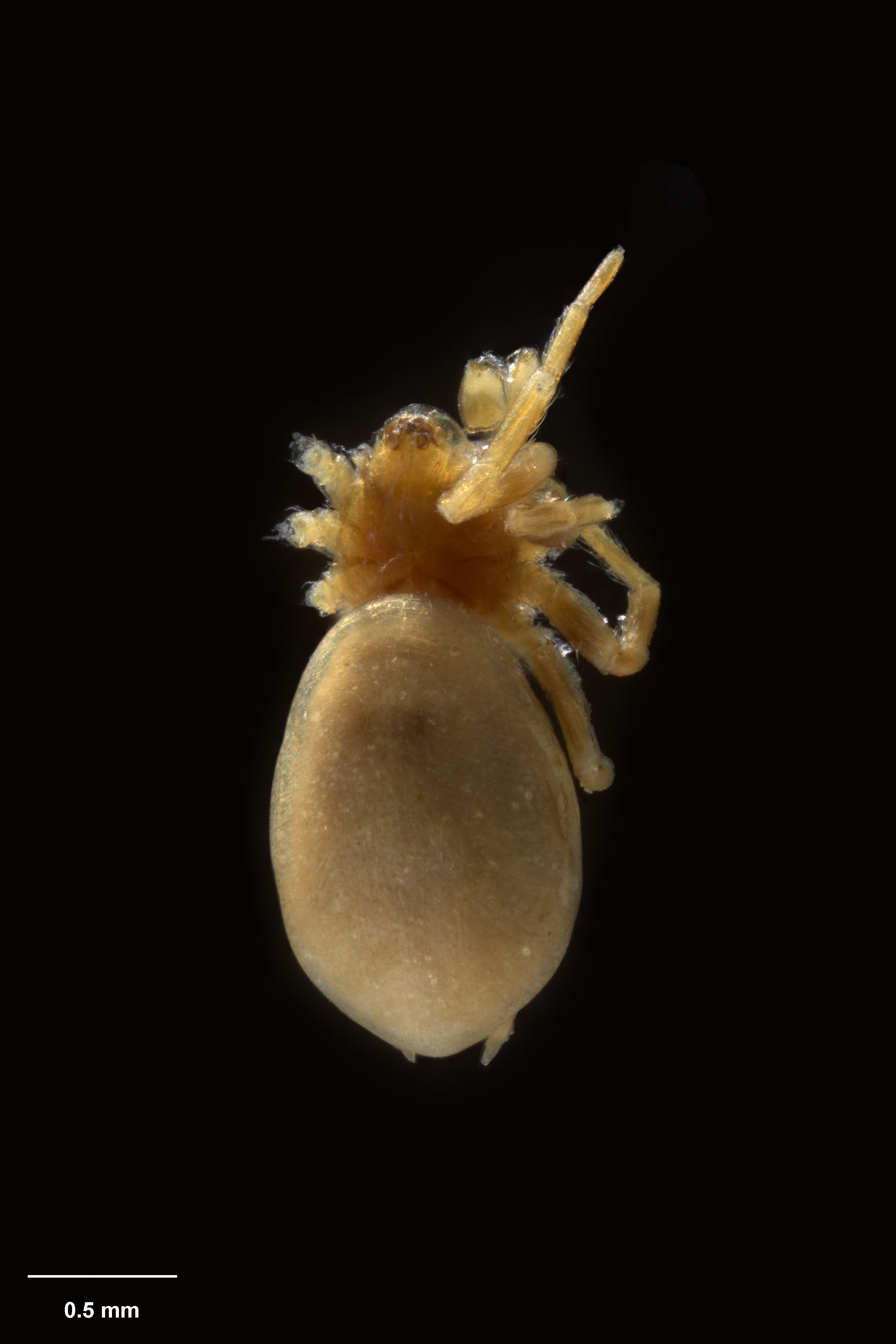
- Kapanga alta

Scientific classification
- Kingdom: Animalia
- Phylum: Arthropoda
- Subphylum: Chelicerata
- Class: Arachnida
- Order: Araneae
- Infraorder: Araneomorphae
- Family: Hahniidae
- Genus: Kapanga; Forster, 1970

Type species
- K. wiltoni Forster, 1970

Species
- 10, see text

Synonyms
- Tuata Forster, 1970

= Kapanga =

Genus of spiders

Kapanga is a genus of South Pacific dwarf sheet spiders that was first described by Raymond Robert Forster in 1970.

== Species ==
As of May 2019 it contains ten species:

- Kapanga alta Forster, 1970 – New Zealand
- Kapanga festiva Forster, 1970 – New Zealand
- Kapanga grana Forster, 1970 – New Zealand
- Kapanga hickmani (Forster, 1964) – New Zealand (Auckland Is.)
- Kapanga isulata (Forster, 1970) – New Zealand
- Kapanga luana Forster, 1970 – New Zealand
- Kapanga mana Forster, 1970 – New Zealand
- Kapanga manga Forster, 1970 – New Zealand
- Kapanga solitaria (Bryant, 1935) – New Zealand
- Kapanga wiltoni Forster, 1970 (type) – New Zealand
