= Cybaeolus =

Scientific classification
- Kingdom: Animalia
- Phylum: Arthropoda
- Subphylum: Chelicerata
- Class: Arachnida
- Order: Araneae
- Infraorder: Araneomorphae
- Family: Hahniidae
- Genus: Cybaeolus; Simon, 1884

Type species
- C. pusillus Simon, 1884

Species
- C. delfini (Simon, 1904) – Chile; C. pusillus Simon, 1884 – Chile, Argentina; C. rastellus (Roth, 1967) – Chile

Synonyms
- Mevianes Simon, 1904

Genus of spiders

Cybaeolus is a genus of South American dwarf sheet spiders that was first described by Eugène Simon in 1884. As of May 2019 it contains only three species: C. delfini, C. pusillus, and C. rastellus.
