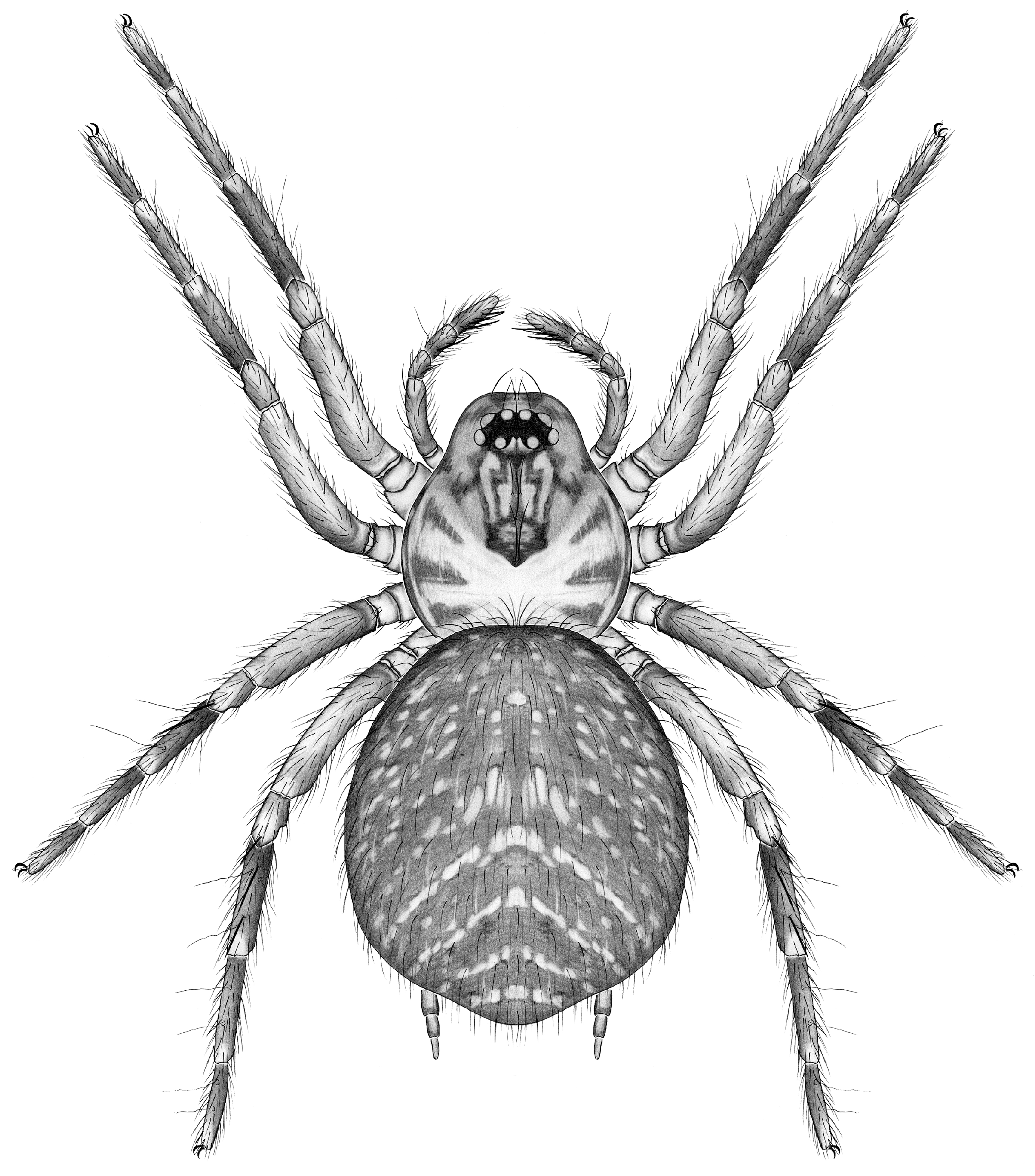
- female N. piemontana
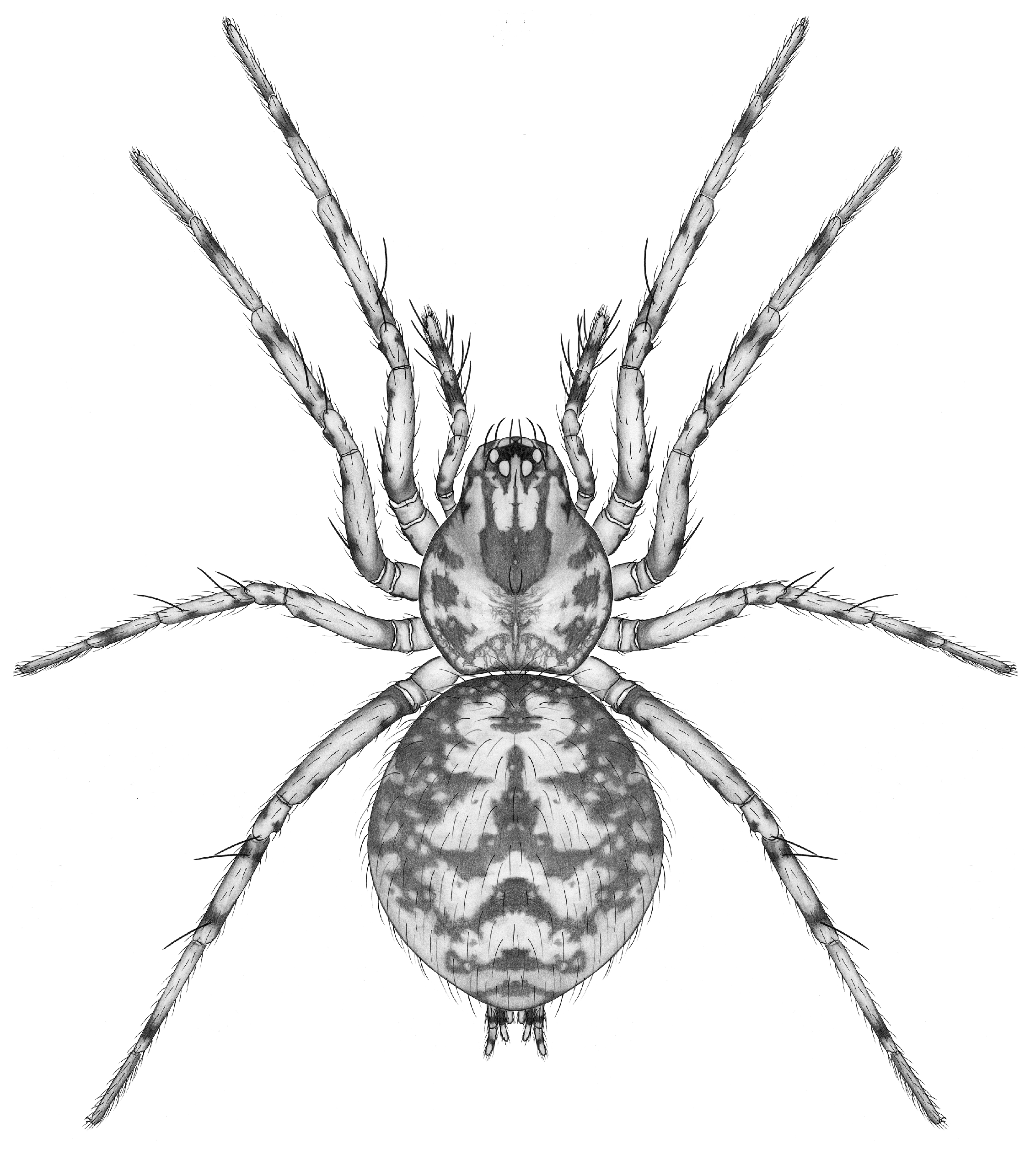
- female N. pristirana

Scientific classification
- Kingdom: Animalia
- Phylum: Arthropoda
- Subphylum: Chelicerata
- Class: Arachnida
- Order: Araneae
- Infraorder: Araneomorphae
- Family: Hahniidae
- Genus: Neohahnia; Mello-Leitão, 1917

Type species
- N. sylviae Mello-Leitão, 1917

Species
- 4, see text

= Neohahnia =

Genus of spiders

Neohahnia is a genus of dwarf sheet spiders that was first described by Cândido Firmino de Mello-Leitão in 1917.

Five new species from Ecuador were described in 2024.

== Species ==
As of October 2025, this genus includes nine species:

- Neohahnia catleyi Dupérré & Tapia, 2024 – Ecuador
- Neohahnia chibcha Heimer & Müller, 1988 – Colombia
- Neohahnia ernsti (Simon, 1898) – Puerto Rico, Cuba, St. Vincent, Colombia, Venezuela, Ecuador, Brazil
- Neohahnia freibergi Dupérré & Tapia, 2024 – Ecuador
- Neohahnia palmicola Mello-Leitão, 1917 – Brazil
- Neohahnia paramo Dupérré & Tapia, 2024 – Ecuador
- Neohahnia piemontana Dupérré & Tapia, 2024 – Ecuador
- Neohahnia pristirana Dupérré & Tapia, 2024 – Ecuador
- Neohahnia sylviae Mello-Leitão, 1917 – Brazil (type species)
