= Asiohahnia =

Scientific classification
- Domain: Eukaryota
- Kingdom: Animalia
- Phylum: Arthropoda
- Subphylum: Chelicerata
- Class: Arachnida
- Order: Araneae
- Infraorder: Araneomorphae
- Family: Hahniidae
- Genus: Asiohahnia; Ovtchinnikov, 1992

Type species
- A. alatavica Ovtchinnikov, 1992

Species
- 8, see text

Genus of spiders

Asiohahnia is a genus of Asian dwarf sheet spiders that was first described by S. V. Ovtchinnikov in 1992.

== Species ==
As of May 2019 it contains eight species:

- Asiohahnia alatavica Ovtchinnikov, 1992 (type) – Kazakhstan, Kyrgyzstan
- Asiohahnia dzhungarica Ovtchinnikov, 1992 – Kazakhstan
- Asiohahnia ketmenica Ovtchinnikov, 1992 – Kazakhstan
- Asiohahnia liangdangensis (Tang, Yang & Kim, 1996) – China
- Asiohahnia longipes Ovtchinnikov, 1992 – Kyrgyzstan
- Asiohahnia reniformis (Chen, Yan & Yin, 2009) – China
- Asiohahnia spinulata Ovtchinnikov, 1992 – Kyrgyzstan
- Asiohahnia xinjiangensis (Wang & Liang, 1989) – China
