= Kasha (spider) =

Scientific classification
- Kingdom: Animalia
- Phylum: Arthropoda
- Subphylum: Chelicerata
- Class: Arachnida
- Order: Araneae
- Infraorder: Araneomorphae
- Family: Hahniidae
- Genus: Kasha; Dupérré & Tapia, 2024
- Species: K. patpa

Binomial name
- Kasha patpa Dupérré & Tapia, 2024

Species of spider

Kasha is a monotypic Ecuadoran genus of spiders in the family Hahniidae, containing the single species Kasha patpa.

== Distribution ==
Kasha patpa is endemic to the Chocó region of Ecuador.

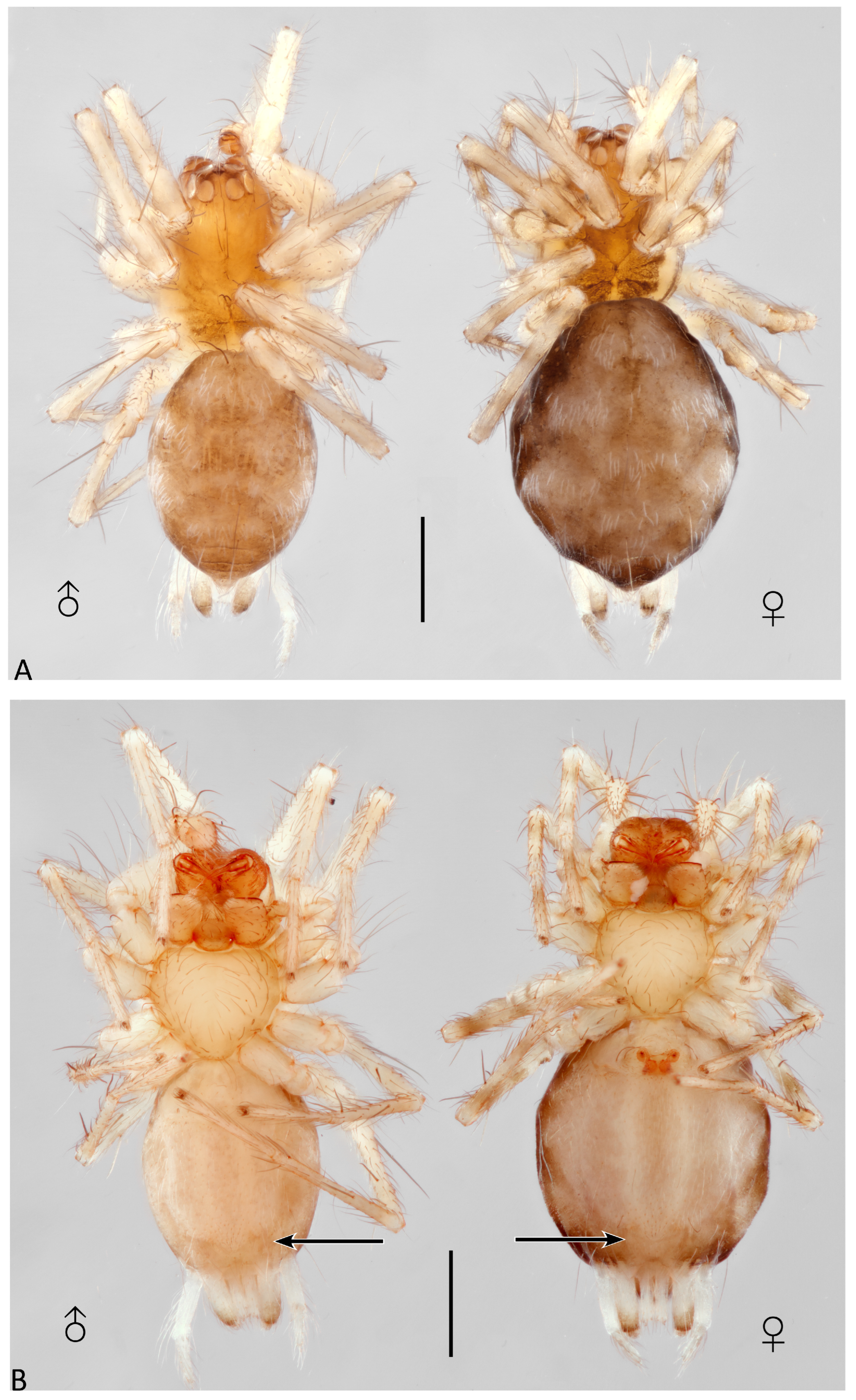
Diagnostic images of male and female

== Etymology ==
The genus name is from the Kichwa language "Kasha" meaning "spiny", referring to the elongated spines found on the species.

The specific name is also from Kichwa, meaning “feather” in reference to the feathery setae found on the abdomen.
