= Typhlohnia =

Scientific classification
- Kingdom: Animalia
- Phylum: Arthropoda
- Subphylum: Chelicerata
- Class: Arachnida
- Order: Araneae
- Infraorder: Araneomorphae
- Family: Hahniidae
- Subfamily: Hahniinae
- Genus: Typhlohnia; Lin & Li, 2023

Type species
- T. rongshui Lin & Li, 2023

Species
- 5, see text

Genus of spiders

Typhlohnia is a genus of spiders in the family Hahniidae.

== Distribution ==
Typhlohnia is found in Guanxi (T. rongshui) and Guizhou (T. kaiyang, T. suiyang) provinces of China, Laos, and Vietnam.

== Life style ==
All described species were found in caves.

== Etymology ==
The genus name is a combination of Ancient Greek τυφλός (tŭphlós) "blind", referring to the degenerated eyes of the genus, and related genus Hahnia.

The species are named after their respective type locality:

- T. banlaksao: Ban Lak Sao, Central Laos
- T. kaiyang: 开阳; Kāiyáng - Kaiyang County, Guizhou province
- T. rongshui: 融水; Róngshuǐ - Rongshui Miao Autonomous County, Guangxi
- T. sondoong: Sơn Đoòng cave ([ʂɤːn1 ɗɔ̤ŋ2]), Central Vietnam; the world's largest natural cave
- T. suiyang: 绥阳; Suíyáng - Suiyang County, Guizhou province

== Species ==
As of October 2025, this genus includes five species:

- Typhlohnia banlaksao Lin & Li, 2023 – Laos
- Typhlohnia kaiyang Lin & Li, 2023 – China
- Typhlohnia rongshui Lin & Li, 2023 – China (type species)
- Typhlohnia sondoong Lin & Li, 2023 – Vietnam
- Typhlohnia suiyang Lin & Li, 2023 – China
