= Paramito =

Scientific classification
- Kingdom: Animalia
- Phylum: Arthropoda
- Subphylum: Chelicerata
- Class: Arachnida
- Order: Araneae
- Infraorder: Araneomorphae
- Family: Hahniidae
- Subfamily: Hahniinae
- Genus: Paramito; Dupérré & Tapia, 2024

Type species
- P. papallacta Dupérré & Tapia, 2024

Species
- 2, see text

Genus of spiders

Paramito is an Ecuadoran genus of spiders in the family Hahniidae.

== Distribution ==
Both described species are endemic to Ecuador. The description of this genus marked the first record of Hahniidae in Ecuador.

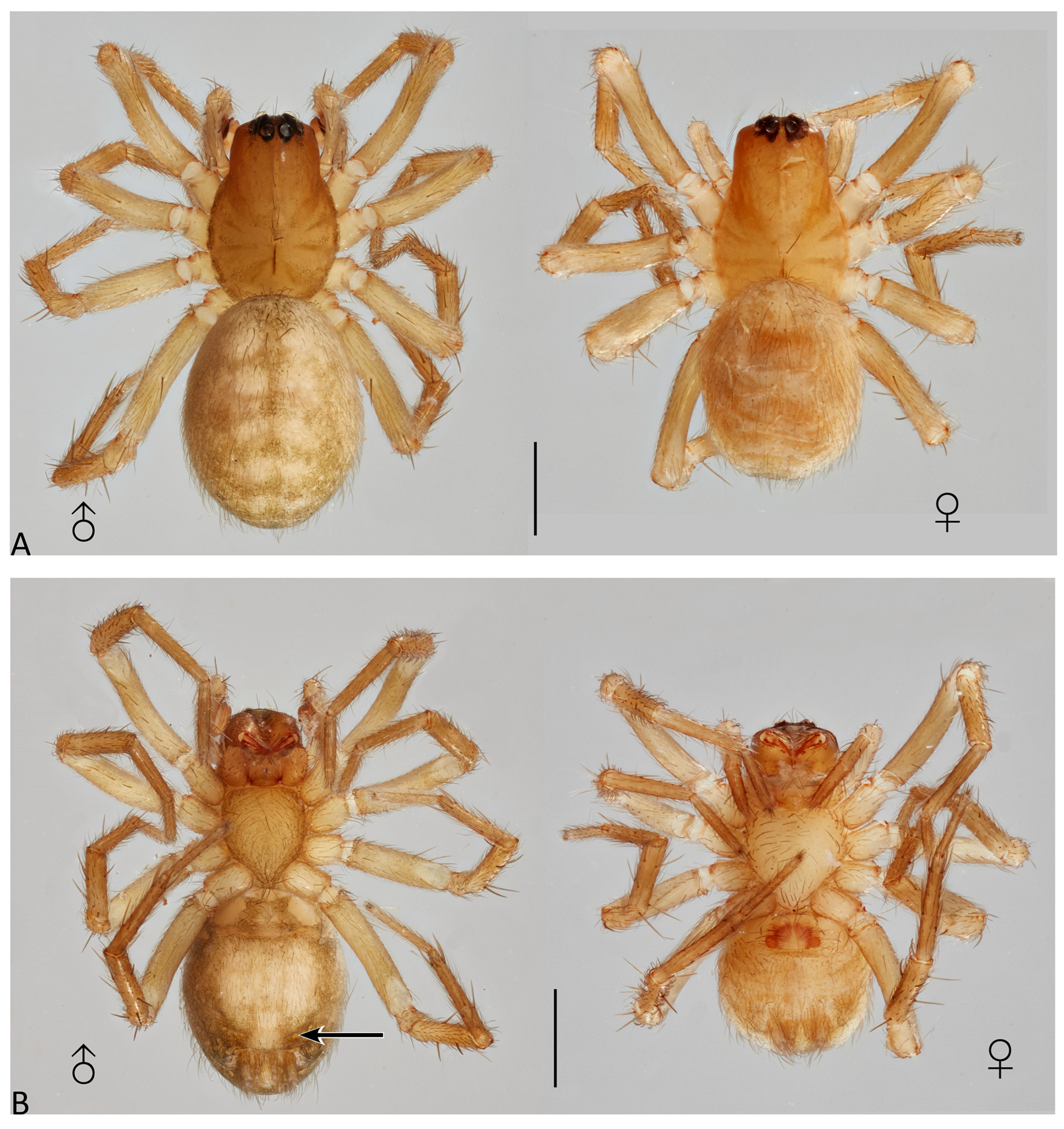
Diagnostic images of P. papallacta

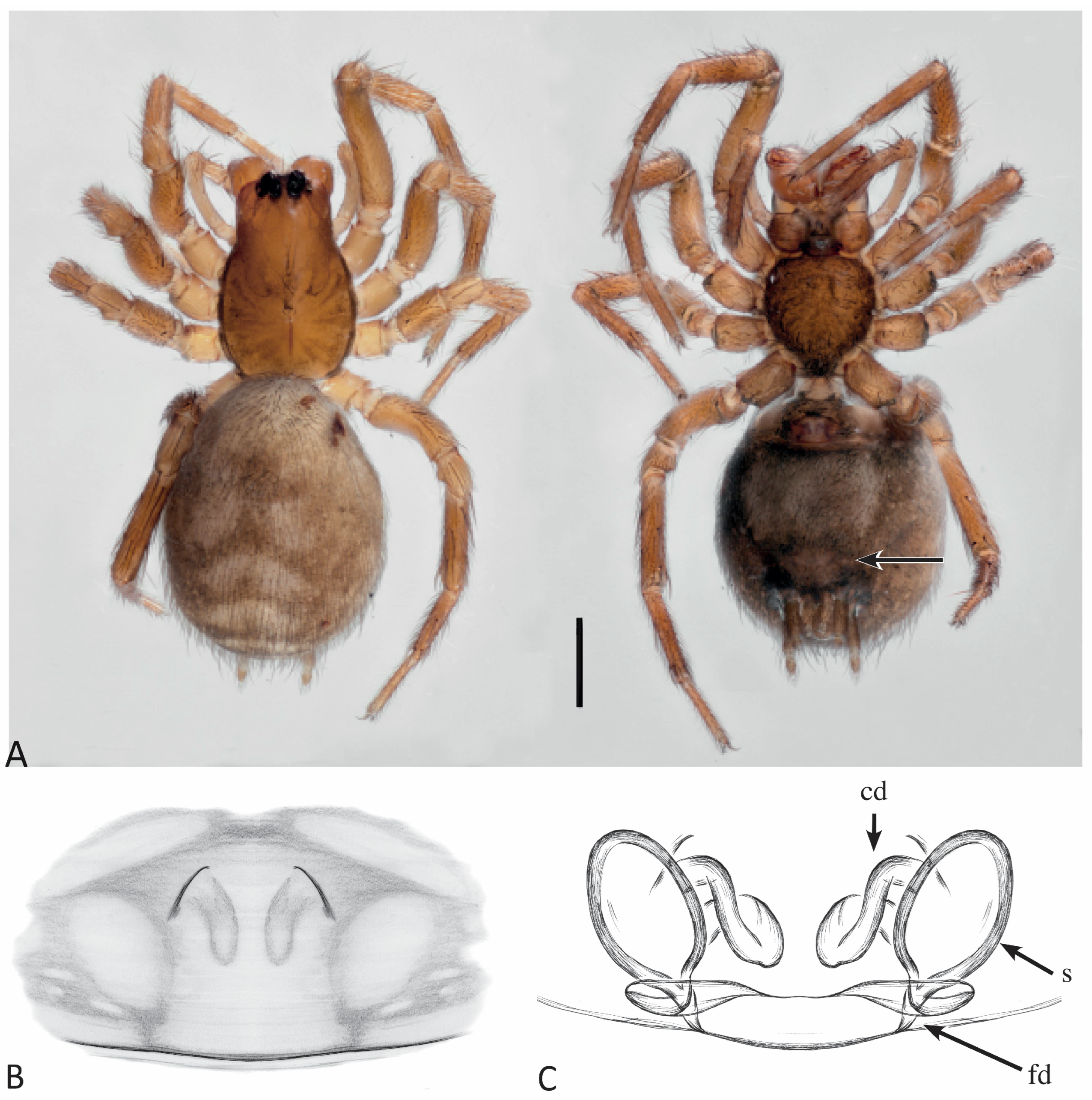
Diagnostic images of P. oyacachi

== Etymology ==
The genus name is a variation of Páramo, the alpine tundra ecosystem where the type species was collected.

P. papallacta was sampled from near Papallacta, Napo Province. P. oyacachi specimens were found near Oyacachi, a town in Pichincha Province.

== Species ==
As of October 2025, this genus includes two species:

- Paramito oyacachi Dupérré & Tapia, 2024 – Ecuador
- Paramito papallacta Dupérré & Tapia, 2024 – Ecuador (type species)
