= Austrohahnia =

Scientific classification
- Kingdom: Animalia
- Phylum: Arthropoda
- Subphylum: Chelicerata
- Class: Arachnida
- Order: Araneae
- Infraorder: Araneomorphae
- Family: Hahniidae
- Genus: Austrohahnia; Mello-Leitão, 1942

Type species
- A. praestans Mello-Leitão, 1942

Species
- A. catleyi Rubio, Lo-Man-Hung & Iuri, 2014 – Argentina; A. melloleitaoi (Schiapelli & Gerschman, 1942) – Argentina; A. praestans Mello-Leitão, 1942 – Argentina

Genus of spiders

Austrohahnia is a genus of South American dwarf sheet spiders that was first described by Cândido Firmino de Mello-Leitão in 1942. As of May 2019 it contains only three species, all found in Argentina: A. catleyi, A. melloleitaoi, and A. praestans.
