= Hexamatia =

Scientific classification
- Kingdom: Animalia
- Phylum: Arthropoda
- Subphylum: Chelicerata
- Class: Arachnida
- Order: Araneae
- Infraorder: Araneomorphae
- Family: Hahniidae
- Genus: Hexamatia; Rivera-Quiroz, Petcharad & Miller, 2020

Type species
- H. seekhaow Rivera-Quiroz, Petcharad & Miller, 2020

Species
- Hexamatia seekhaow Rivera-Quiroz, Petcharad & Miller, 2020; Hexamatia senaria (Zhang, Li & Zheng, 2011)

Genus of spiders

Hexamatia is a small genus of Asian dwarf sheet spiders first described by F. A. Rivera-Quiroz, B. Petcharad and J. A. Miller in 2020.

== Species ==
As of January 2026, this genus includes two species:

- Hexamatia seekhaow Rivera-Quiroz, Petcharad & Miller, 2020 – Thailand
- Hexamatia senaria (Zhang, Li & Zheng, 2011) – China

== See also ==
- Hahnia
