= Lord of the River =

Lord of the River (Chinese: 河伯) may refer to the following East Asian river gods:

- Hebo, god of the Yellow River in Chinese mythology
- Habaek, Goguryeo god of the Amnok River
- Kawa-no-kami, river god in Japanese mythology
