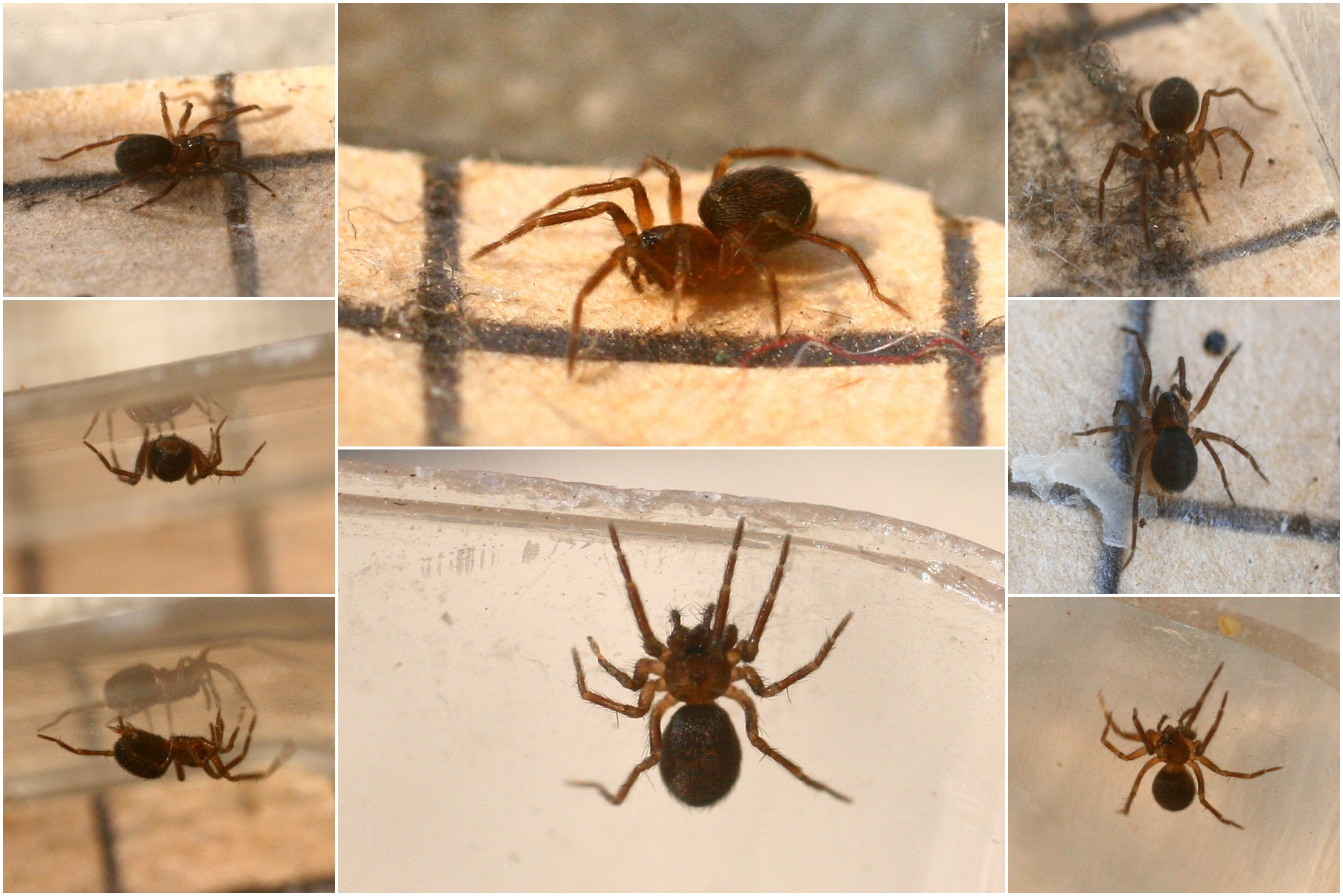
- Montage of Iberina montana, England

Scientific classification
- Kingdom: Animalia
- Phylum: Arthropoda
- Subphylum: Chelicerata
- Class: Arachnida
- Order: Araneae
- Infraorder: Araneomorphae
- Family: Hahniidae
- Genus: Iberina; Simon, 1881

Type species
- I. mazarredoi Simon, 1881

Species
- 6, see text

= Iberina =

Genus of spiders

Iberina is a genus of dwarf sheet spiders that was first described by Eugène Simon in 1881.

== Species ==
As of May 2019 it contains six species:

- Iberina candida (Simon, 1875) – Europe, North Africa, Turkey, Israel
- Iberina difficilis (Harm, 1966) – France, Italy, Central Europe, Romania, Bulgaria
- Iberina ljovuschkini Pichka, 1965 – Russia (Caucasus)
- Iberina mazarredoi Simon, 1881 (type) – Spain, France
- Iberina microphthalma (Snazell & Duffey, 1980) – Britain, Switzerland, Germany, Czech Rep., Hungary
- Iberina montana (Blackwall, 1841) – Europe, Turkey
