= Lords River =

River on Stewart Island, New Zealand

Lords River / Tūtaekawetoweto
- Location within New Zealand
- Native name: Tūtaekawetoweto (Māori)

Location
- Country: New Zealand
- Region: Southland
- District: Southland District

Physical characteristics
- Source
  - coordinates: 46°59′29″S 167°56′25″E
  - elevation: 490 m (1,610 ft)
- Mouth
  - location: Pacific Ocean
  - coordinates: 47°06′11″S 168°06′18″E
  - elevation: Sea Level
- Length: 35 km (22 mi)

The Lords River, officially Lords River / Tūtaekawetoweto, is a river on Stewart Island, New Zealand. It is called Tutae Ka Wetoweto (sometimes Tutae-Ka-Wetoweto) in Māori. Named Port South East by Owen Smith when he first charted the island in 1804, the river was later renamed Lords River by John Grono in 1809.

== See also ==
- List of rivers of New Zealand
