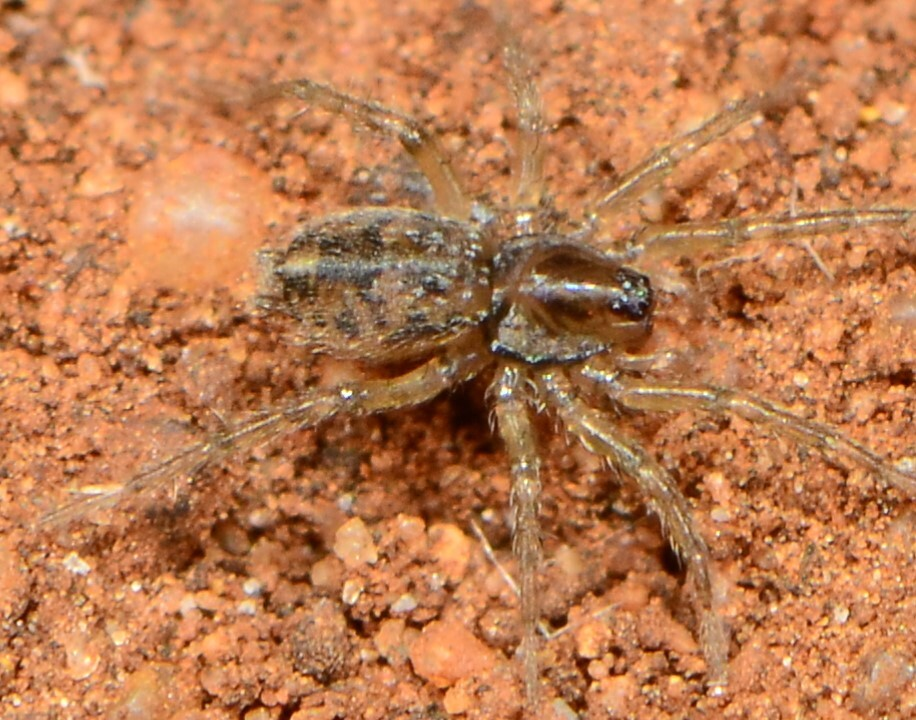
- Female Hahnia lobata
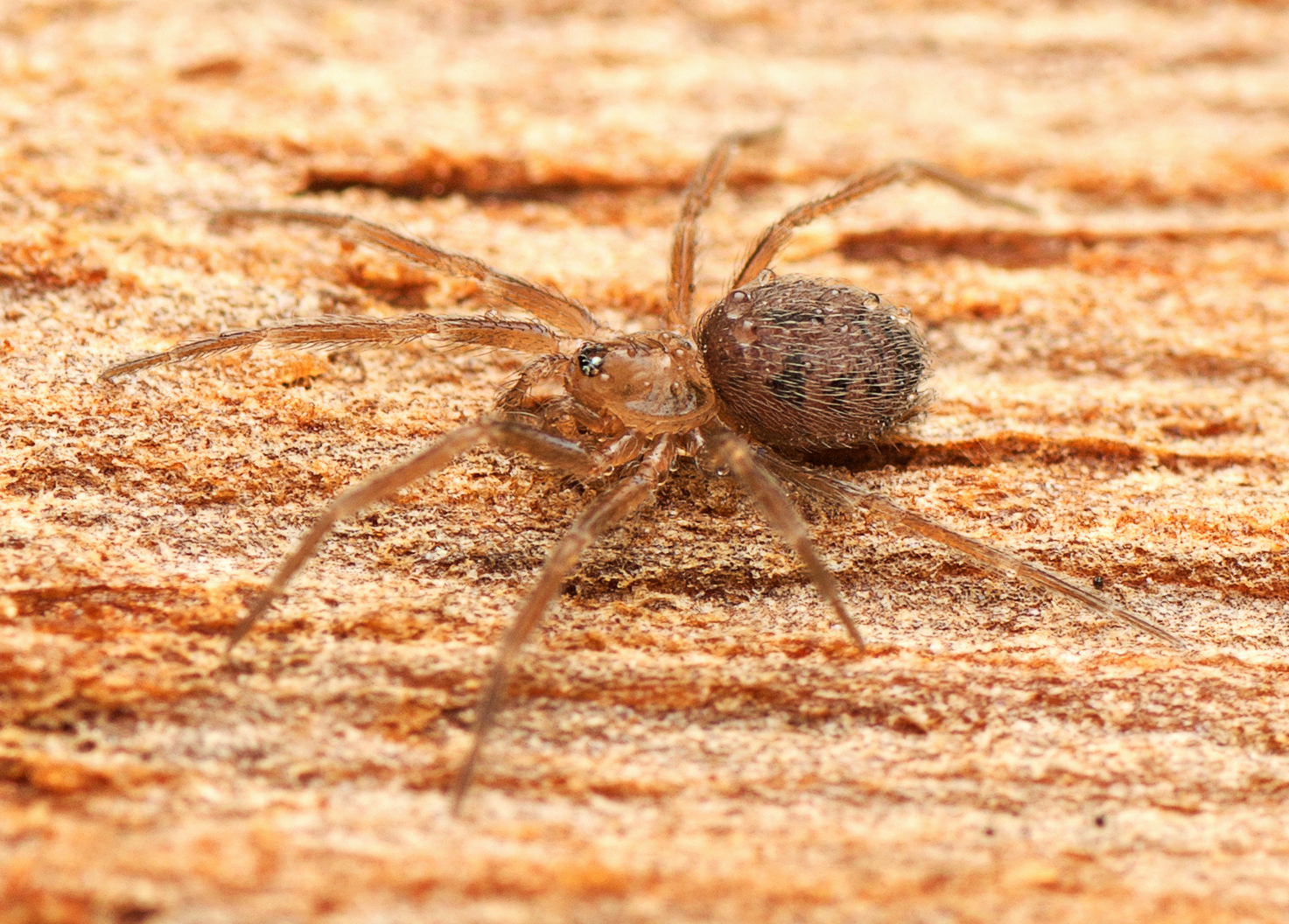
- Scotospilus ampullarius

Scientific classification
- Kingdom: Animalia
- Phylum: Arthropoda
- Subphylum: Chelicerata
- Class: Arachnida
- Order: Araneae
- Infraorder: Araneomorphae
- Family: Hahniidae; Bertkau, 1878

Diversity
- 29 genera, 244 species
- blue: reported countries (WSC) green: observation hotspots (iNaturalist)

= Dwarf sheet spider =

Dwarf sheet spiders Temporal range: Palaeogene–present

Family of spiders

Dwarf sheet spiders (Hahniidae) is a family of araneomorph spiders, first described by Philipp Bertkau in 1878.

== Description ==
Hahniidae are six or eight-eyed entelegyne ecribellate spiders, with bodies about 1-5 mm long. They build extremely delicate webs in the form of a sheet that does not lead to a retreat. These webs are found in leaf litter, mosses, or trees. The silk used in these webs is so fine that they are difficult to spot unless they are coated with dew. They are characterized by the arrangement of their six spinnerets in a transverse row. The last segment of the outer spinnerets is quite long and stands out above all the others.

== Life style ==
Hahniidae greatly favor locations near water or near moss, and are often found in leaf litter and detritus or on the leaves of shrubs and trees.

== Distribution ==
Hahniidae are a worldwide family. The genera of the Northern Hemisphere and Africa tend to differ in their genital structures from those of the Southern Hemisphere. Very few species have been described from southeast Asia, although quite a number seem to be yet undescribed.

== Name ==
The family is named after the type genus Hahnia, which is dedicated to German zoologist Carl Wilhelm Hahn.

== Genera ==
As of October 2025, this family includes 29 genera and 244 species:

- Alistra Thorell, 1894 – China, Indonesia, Philippines, Vietnam, Sri Lanka, Australia, Solomon Islands, New Zealand, Samoa, Réunion
- Amaloxenops Schiapelli & Gerschman, 1958 – Argentina, Ecuador
- Antistea Simon, 1898 – Tunisia, Japan, Turkey, Russia, North America
- Asiohahnia Ovtchinnikov, 1992 – Kazakhstan, Kyrgyzstan, China
- Austrohahnia Mello-Leitão, 1942 – Argentina
- Cybaeolus Simon, 1884 – Argentina, Chile
- Goblinia Lin & Li, 2023 – China
- Hahnia C. L. Koch, 1841 – Africa, Asia, Europe, North America, South America, Crozet Islands
- Hahniharmia Wunderlich, 2004 – Europe
- Harmiella Brignoli, 1979 – Brazil
- Hexamatia Rivera-Quiroz, Petcharad & Miller, 2020 – China, Thailand
- Iberina Simon, 1881 – Georgia, Israel, Turkey, Europe, North Africa
- Intihuatana Lehtinen, 1967 – Argentina
- Kapanga Forster, 1970 – New Zealand
- Kasha Dupérré & Tapia, 2024 – Ecuador
- Lizarba Roth, 1967 – Brazil
- Myahnia Lin & Li, 2023 – Myanmar
- Neoantistea Gertsch, 1934 – Asia, North America
- Neoaviola Butler, 1929 – Australia
- Neohahnia Mello-Leitão, 1917 – Cuba, Puerto Rico, St. Vincent, South America
- Pacifantistea Marusik, 2011 – Japan, Russia
- Paramito Dupérré & Tapia, 2024 – Ecuador
- Porioides Forster, 1989 – New Zealand
- Pristirana Dupérré & Tapia, 2024 – Ecuador
- Rinawa Forster, 1970 – New Zealand
- Scotospilus Simon, 1886 – Vietnam, India, Australia, New Zealand
- Sinahahnia Wang & Zhang, 2024 – China
- Troglohnia Lin & Li, 2023 – China
- Typhlohnia Lin & Li, 2023 – China, Laos, Vietnam
