= List of Agelenidae species =

This page lists all described genera and species of the spider family Agelenidae. As of January 2020, the World Spider Catalog accepts 1468 species in 83 genera:

== A ==
=== Acutipetala ===
Acutipetala Dankittipakul & Zhang, 2008

- Acutipetala donglini Dankittipakul & Zhang, 2008 — Thailand
- Acutipetala octoginta Dankittipakul & Zhang, 2008 (type) — Thailand

=== Agelena ===
Agelena Walckenaer, 1805

- Agelena agelenoides (Walckenaer, 1841) — Western Mediterranean
- Agelena annulipedella Strand, 1913 — Central Africa
- Agelena atlantea Fage, 1938 — Morocco
- Agelena australis Simon, 1896 — South Africa
- Agelena babai Tanikawa, 2005 — Japan
- Agelena barunae Tikader, 1970 — India
- Agelena borbonica Vinson, 1863 — Réunion
- Agelena canariensis Lucas, 1838 — Canary Is., Morocco, Algeria
- Agelena chayu Zhang, Zhu & Song, 2005 — China
- Agelena choi Paik, 1965 — Korea
- Agelena consociata Denis, 1965 — Gabon
- Agelena cuspidata Zhang, Zhu & Song, 2005 — China
- Agelena doris Hogg, 1922 — Vietnam
- Agelena dubiosa Strand, 1908 — Ethiopia, Rwanda
- Agelena funerea Simon, 1909 — East Africa
- Agelena gaerdesi Roewer, 1955 — Namibia
- Agelena gautami Tikader, 1962 — India
- Agelena gomerensis Wunderlich, 1992 — Canary Is.
- Agelena gonzalezi Schmidt, 1980 — Canary Is.
- Agelena hirsutissima Caporiacco, 1940 — Ethiopia
- Agelena howelli Benoit, 1978 — Tanzania
- Agelena incertissima Caporiacco, 1939 — Ethiopia
- Agelena inda Simon, 1897 — India
- Agelena injuria Fox, 1936 — China
- Agelena jaundea Roewer, 1955 — Cameroon
- Agelena jirisanensis Paik, 1965 — Korea
- Agelena jumbo Strand, 1913 — Central Africa
- Agelena jumbo kiwuensis Strand, 1913 — East Africa
- Agelena keniana Roewer, 1955 — Kenya
- Agelena kiboschensis Lessert, 1915 — Central, East Africa
- Agelena labyrinthica (Clerck, 1757) (type) — Europe to Central Asia, China, Korea, Japan
- Agelena lawrencei Roewer, 1955 — Zimbabwe
- Agelena limbata Thorell, 1897 — China, Korea, Myanmar, Laos
- Agelena lingua Strand, 1913 — Central Africa
- Agelena littoricola Strand, 1913 — Central Africa
- Agelena longimamillata Roewer, 1955 — Mozambique
- Agelena longipes Carpenter, 1900 — Britain
- Agelena lukla Nishikawa, 1980 — Nepal, China
- Agelena maracandensis (Charitonov, 1946) — Central Asia
- Agelena moschiensis Roewer, 1955 — Tanzania
- Agelena mossambica Roewer, 1955 — Mozambique
- Agelena nigra Caporiacco, 1940 — Ethiopia
- Agelena nyassana Roewer, 1955 — Malawi
- Agelena oaklandensis Barman, 1979 — India
- Agelena orientalis C. L. Koch, 1837 — Italy to Central Asia, Iran
- Agelena poliosata Wang, 1991 — China
- Agelena republicana Darchen, 1967 — Gabon
- Agelena satmila Tikader, 1970 — India
- Agelena secsuensis Lendl, 1898 — China
- Agelena sherpa Nishikawa, 1980 — Nepal
- Agelena shillongensis Tikader, 1969 — India
- Agelena silvatica Oliger, 1983 — Russia (Far East), China, Japan
- Agelena suboculata Simon, 1910 — Namibia
- †Agelena tabida C. L. Koch & Berendt, 1854 — Palaeogene Baltic amber
- Agelena tadzhika Andreeva, 1976 — Russia (Europe) to Central Asia
- Agelena tenerifensis Wunderlich, 1992 — Canary Is.
- Agelena tenuella Roewer, 1955 — Cameroon
- Agelena tenuis Hogg, 1922 — Vietnam
- Agelena teteana Roewer, 1955 — Mozambique
- Agelena tungchis Lee, 1998 — Taiwan
- Agelena zuluana Roewer, 1955 — South Africa

=== Agelenella ===
Agelenella Lehtinen, 1967

- Agelenella pusilla (Pocock, 1903) (type) — Yemen (mainland, Socotra)

=== Agelenopsis ===
Agelenopsis

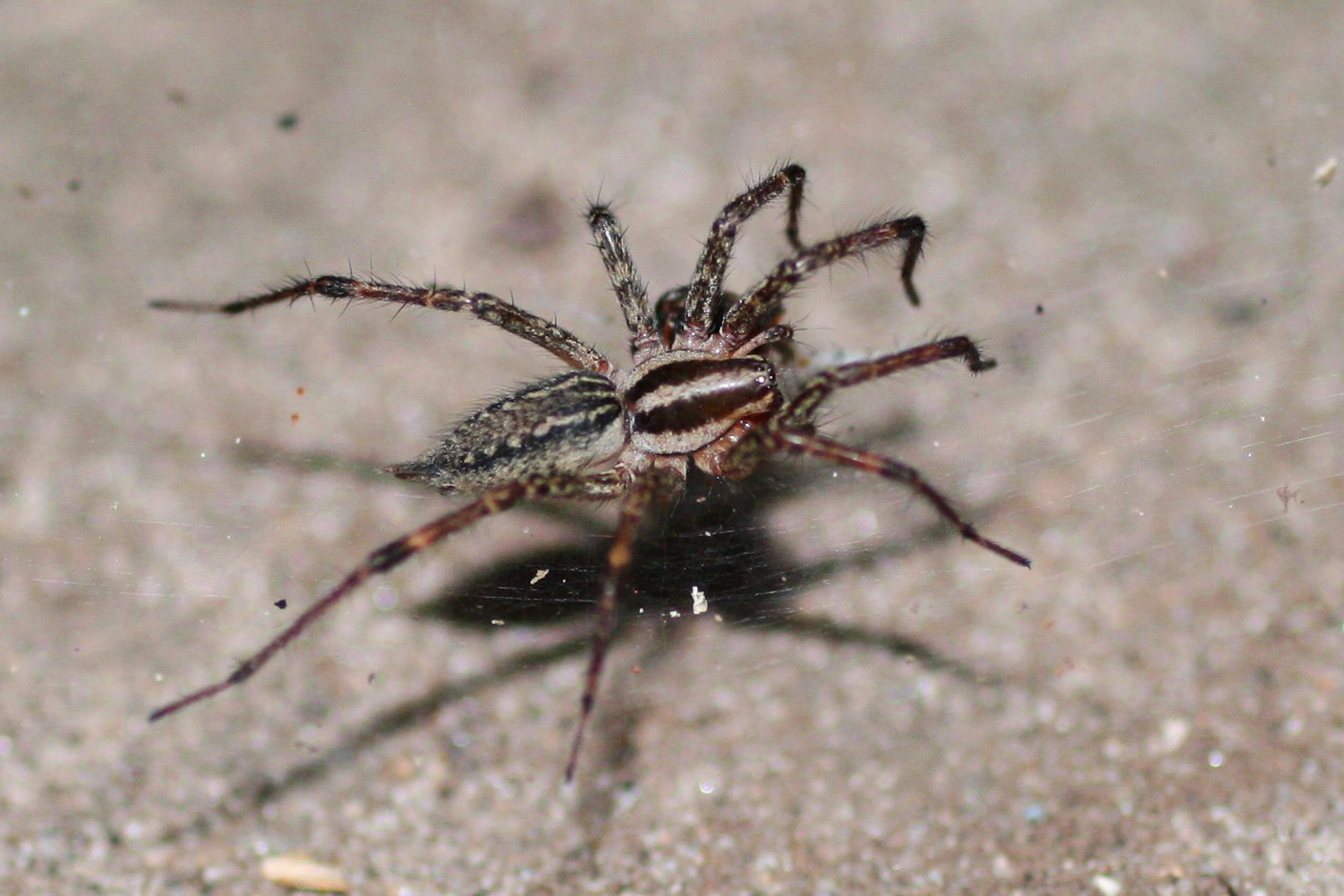
Agelenopsis naevia

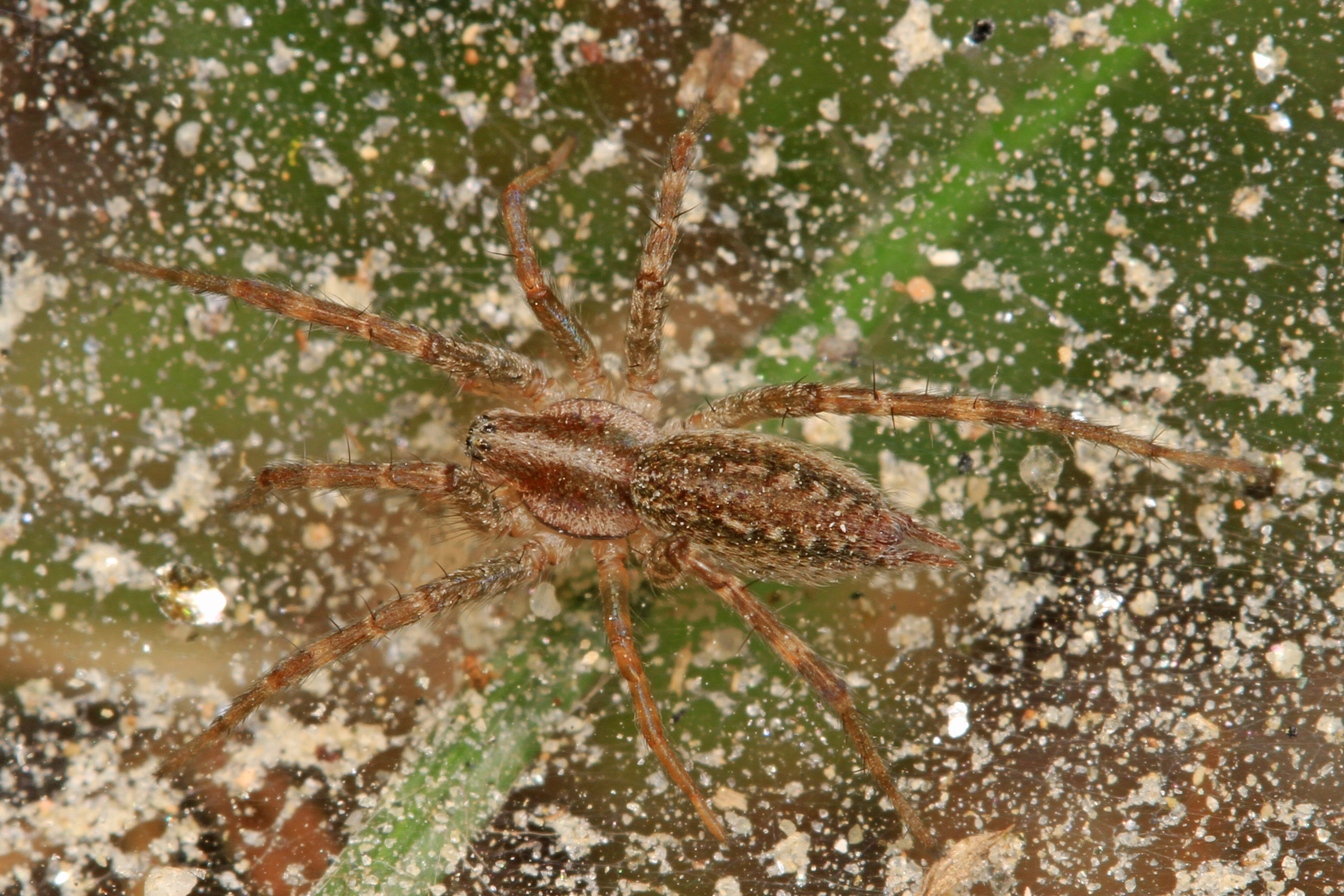
Agelenopsis pennsylvanica

Agelenopsis Giebel, 1869

- Agelenopsis actuosa (Gertsch & Ivie, 1936) — USA, Canada
- Agelenopsis aleenae Chamberlin & Ivie, 1935 — USA
- Agelenopsis aperta (Gertsch, 1934) — USA, Mexico
- Agelenopsis emertoni Chamberlin & Ivie, 1935 — USA
- Agelenopsis kastoni Chamberlin & Ivie, 1941 — USA
- Agelenopsis longistyla (Banks, 1901) — USA
- Agelenopsis naevia (Walckenaer, 1841) — USA, Canada
- Agelenopsis oklahoma (Gertsch, 1936) — USA, Canada
- Agelenopsis oregonensis Chamberlin & Ivie, 1935 — USA, Canada
- Agelenopsis pennsylvanica (C. L. Koch, 1843) — USA
- Agelenopsis potteri (Blackwall, 1846) (type) — North America. Introduced to Ukraine, Russia (Europe, Far East), Kyrgyzstan
- Agelenopsis riechertae Bosco & Chuang, 2018 — USA
- Agelenopsis spatula Chamberlin & Ivie, 1935 — USA
- Agelenopsis utahana (Chamberlin & Ivie, 1933) — USA, Canada

=== Ageleradix ===
Ageleradix Xu & Li, 2007

- Ageleradix cymbiforma (Wang, 1991) — China
- Ageleradix otiforma (Wang, 1991) — China
- Ageleradix schwendingeri Zhang, Li & Xu, 2008 — China
- Ageleradix sichuanensis Xu & Li, 2007 (type) — China
- Ageleradix sternseptum Zhang, Li & Xu, 2008 — China
- Ageleradix zhishengi Zhang, Li & Xu, 2008 — China

=== Agelescape ===
Agelescape Levy, 1996

- Agelescape affinis (Kulczyński, 1911) — Turkey, Syria
- Agelescape caucasica Guseinov, Marusik & Koponen, 2005 — Greece, Azerbaijan
- Agelescape dunini Guseinov, Marusik & Koponen, 2005 — Azerbaijan
- Agelescape gideoni Levy, 1996 — Turkey to Israel, Iran
- Agelescape levyi Guseinov, Marusik & Koponen, 2005 — Azerbaijan
- Agelescape livida (Simon, 1875) (type) — Mediterranean
- Agelescape talyshica Guseinov, Marusik & Koponen, 2005 — Azerbaijan

=== Ahua ===
Ahua Forster & Wilton, 1973

- Ahua dentata Forster & Wilton, 1973 — New Zealand
- Ahua insula Forster & Wilton, 1973 — New Zealand
- Ahua kaituna Forster & Wilton, 1973 — New Zealand
- Ahua vulgaris Forster & Wilton, 1973 (type) — New Zealand

=== Allagelena ===
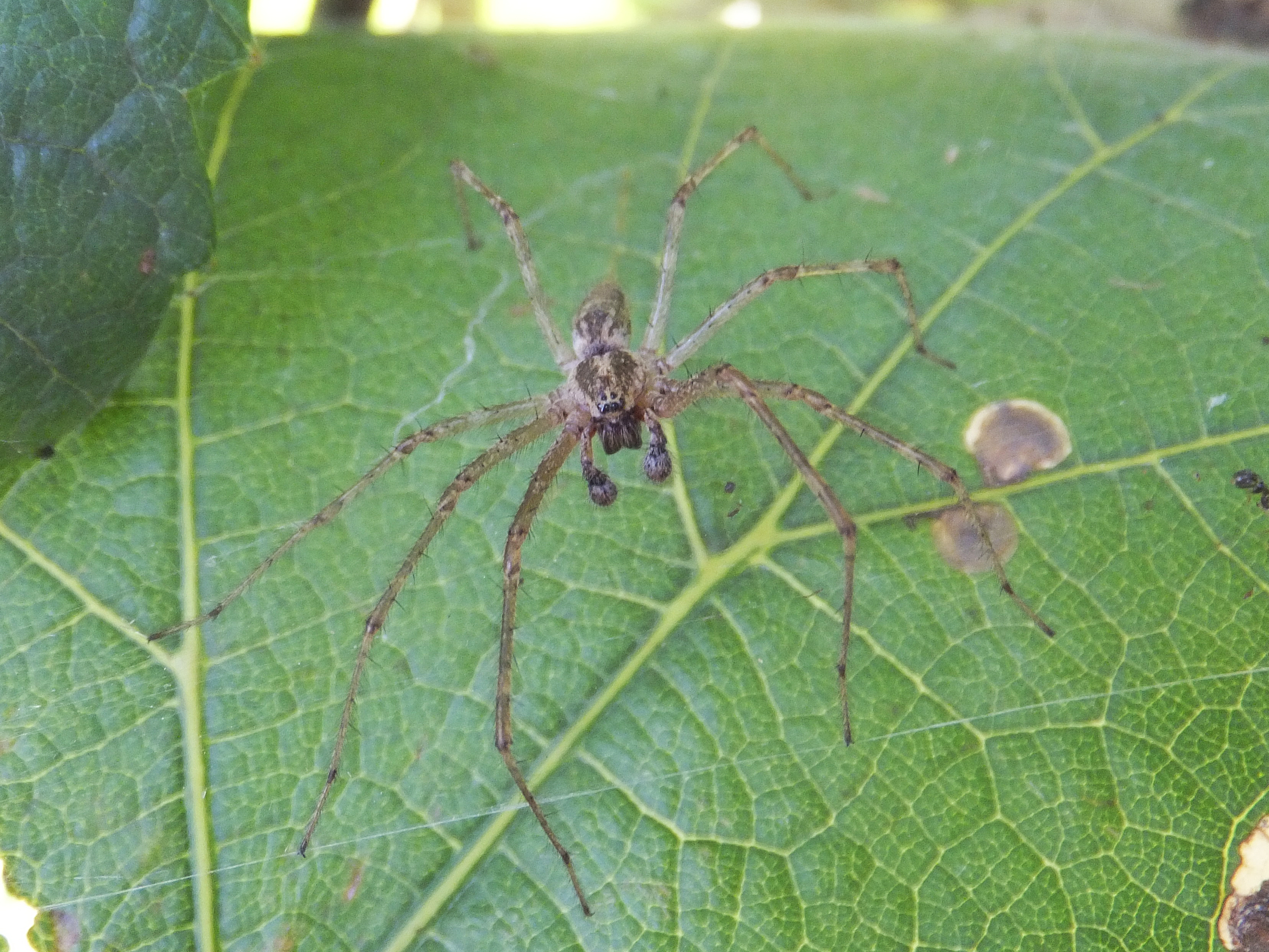
Allagelena gracilens

Allagelena Zhang, Zhu & Song, 2006

- Allagelena bifida (Wang, 1997) — China
- Allagelena bistriata (Grube, 1861) (type) — Russia (Far East), China
- Allagelena difficilis (Fox, 1936) — China, Korea
- Allagelena donggukensis (Kim, 1996) — Korea, Japan
- Allagelena gracilens (C. L. Koch, 1841) — Europe to Central Asia
- Allagelena koreana (Paik, 1965) — China, Korea
- Allagelena monticola Chami-Kranon, Likhitrakarn & Dankittipakul, 2007 — Thailand
- Allagelena opulenta (L. Koch, 1878) — Korea, Japan
- Allagelena scopulata (Wang, 1991) — China

=== Alloclubionoides ===
Alloclubionoides Paik, 1992

- Alloclubionoides amurensis (Ovtchinnikov, 1999) — Russia (Far East)
- Alloclubionoides bifidus (Paik, 1976) — Korea
- Alloclubionoides cochlea (Kim, Lee & Kwon, 2007) — Korea
- Alloclubionoides coreanus Paik, 1992 (type) — Korea
- Alloclubionoides dimidiatus (Paik, 1974) — Korea
- Alloclubionoides euini (Paik, 1976) — Korea
- Alloclubionoides geumensis Seo, 2014 — Korea
- Alloclubionoides grandivulvus (Yaginuma, 1969) — Japan
- Alloclubionoides huanren Zhang, Zhu & Wang, 2017 — China
- Alloclubionoides hwaseongensis Kim, Yoo & Lee, 2018 — Korea
- Alloclubionoides imi Kim, Yoo & Lee, 2018 — Korea
- Alloclubionoides jaegeri (Kim, 2007) — Korea
- Alloclubionoides jirisanensis Kim, 2009 — Korea
- Alloclubionoides kimi (Paik, 1974) — Korea
- Alloclubionoides lunatus (Paik, 1976) — Korea
- Alloclubionoides mandzhuricus (Ovtchinnikov, 1999) — Russia (Far East)
- Alloclubionoides meniscatus (Zhu & Wang, 1991) — China
- Alloclubionoides naejangensis Seo, 2014 — Korea
- Alloclubionoides namhaensis Seo, 2014 — Korea
- Alloclubionoides namhansanensis Kim, Yoo & Lee, 2018 — Korea
- Alloclubionoides napolovi (Ovtchinnikov, 1999) — Russia (Far East)
- Alloclubionoides nariceus (Zhu & Wang, 1994) — China
- Alloclubionoides nasuta Kim, Yoo & Lee, 2018 — Korea
- Alloclubionoides ovatus (Paik, 1976) — Korea
- Alloclubionoides paiki (Ovtchinnikov, 1999) — Russia (Far East)
- Alloclubionoides paikwunensis (Kim & Jung, 1993) — Korea
- Alloclubionoides pseudonariceus (Zhang, Zhu & Song, 2007) — China
- Alloclubionoides quadrativulvus (Paik, 1974) — Korea
- Alloclubionoides rostratus (Song, Zhu, Gao & Guan, 1993) — China
- Alloclubionoides solea Kim & Kim, 2012 — Korea
- Alloclubionoides terdecimus (Paik, 1978) — Korea
- Alloclubionoides triangulatus (Zhang, Zhu & Song, 2007) — China
- Alloclubionoides trisaccatus (Zhang, Zhu & Song, 2007) — China
- Alloclubionoides wolchulsanensis Kim, 2009 — Korea
- Alloclubionoides yangyangensis Seo, 2014 — Korea

=== Aterigena ===
Aterigena Bolzern, Hänggi & Burckhardt, 2010

- Aterigena aculeata (Wang, 1992) — China
- Aterigena aliquoi (Brignoli, 1971) — Italy (Sicily)
- Aterigena aspromontensis Bolzern, Hänggi & Burckhardt, 2010 — Italy
- Aterigena ligurica (Simon, 1916) (type) — France, Italy
- Aterigena soriculata (Simon, 1873) — France (Corsica), Italy (Sardinia)

==== Azerithonica ====
Azerithonica Guseinov, Marusik & Koponen, 2005

- Azerithonica hyrcanica Guseinov, Marusik & Koponen, 2005 (type) — Azerbaijan

== B ==
=== Bajacalilena ===
Bajacalilena Maya-Morales & Jiménez, 2017

- Bajacalilena bolzerni Maya-Morales & Jiménez, 2017 — Mexico
- Bajacalilena clarki Maya-Morales & Jiménez, 2017 (type) — Mexico

=== Barronopsis ===
Barronopsis Chamberlin & Ivie, 1941

- Barronopsis arturoi Alayón, 1993 — Cuba
- Barronopsis barrowsi (Gertsch, 1934) (type) — USA, Cuba, Hispaniola
- Barronopsis floridensis (Roth, 1954) — USA, Bahama Is.
- Barronopsis jeffersi (Muma, 1945) — USA, Cuba
- Barronopsis pelempito Alayón, 2012 — Hispaniola
- Barronopsis stephaniae Stocks, 2009 — USA
- Barronopsis texana (Gertsch, 1934) — USA

=== Benoitia ===
Benoitia Lehtinen, 1967

- Benoitia agraulosa (Wang & Wang, 1991) — China
- Benoitia bornemiszai (Caporiacco, 1947) (type) — East Africa
- Benoitia deserticola (Simon, 1910) — Namibia, Botswana
- Benoitia lepida (O. Pickard-Cambridge, 1876) — Spain, North Africa, Turkey, Cyprus, Israel, Yemen, Saudi Arabia, Kuwait, Iraq, Iran
- Benoitia ocellata (Pocock, 1900) — South Africa
- Benoitia raymondeae (Lessert, 1915) — East Africa
- Benoitia rhodesiae (Pocock, 1901) — Southern Africa
- Benoitia timida (Audouin, 1826) — Egypt, Israel
- Benoitia upembana (Roewer, 1955) — Congo

=== Bifidocoelotes ===
Bifidocoelotes Wang, 2002

- Bifidocoelotes bifidus (Wang, Tso & Wu, 2001) (type) — Taiwan
- Bifidocoelotes obscurus Zhou, Yuen & Zhang, 2017 — China (Hong Kong)
- Bifidocoelotes primus (Fox, 1937) — China (Hong Kong)

== C ==
=== Cabolena ===
Cabolena Maya-Morales & Jiménez, 2017

- Cabolena huiztocatl Maya-Morales & Jiménez, 2017 — Mexico
- Cabolena kosatli Maya-Morales, Jiménez & Palacios-Cardiel, 2017 (type) — Mexico
- Cabolena sotol Maya-Morales, Jiménez & Palacios-Cardiel, 2017 — Mexico

=== Calilena ===
Calilena Chamberlin & Ivie, 1941

- Calilena absoluta (Gertsch, 1936) — USA
- Calilena adna Chamberlin & Ivie, 1941 — USA
- Calilena angelena Chamberlin & Ivie, 1941 — USA, Mexico
- Calilena arizonica Chamberlin & Ivie, 1941 — USA
- Calilena californica (Banks, 1896) — USA
- Calilena gertschi Chamberlin & Ivie, 1941 — USA
- Calilena gosoga Chamberlin & Ivie, 1941 — USA
- Calilena magna Chamberlin & Ivie, 1941 — USA
- Calilena nita Chamberlin & Ivie, 1941 — USA
- Calilena peninsulana (Banks, 1898) — Mexico
- Calilena restricta Chamberlin & Ivie, 1941 — USA
- Calilena restricta dixiana Chamberlin & Ivie, 1941 — USA
- Calilena saylori Chamberlin & Ivie, 1941 (type) — USA
- Calilena siva Chamberlin & Ivie, 1941 — USA
- Calilena stylophora Chamberlin & Ivie, 1941 — USA
- Calilena stylophora laguna Chamberlin & Ivie, 1941 — USA
- Calilena stylophora oregona Chamberlin & Ivie, 1941 — USA
- Calilena stylophora pomona Chamberlin & Ivie, 1941 — USA
- Calilena umatilla Chamberlin & Ivie, 1941 — USA
- Calilena umatilla schizostyla Chamberlin & Ivie, 1941 — USA
- Calilena yosemita Chamberlin & Ivie, 1941 — USA

=== Callidalena ===
Callidalena Maya-Morales & Jiménez, 2017

- Callidalena quintin Maya-Morales & Jiménez, 2017 (type) — Mexico
- Callidalena tijuana Maya-Morales & Jiménez, 2017 — USA, Mexico

=== Coelotes ===
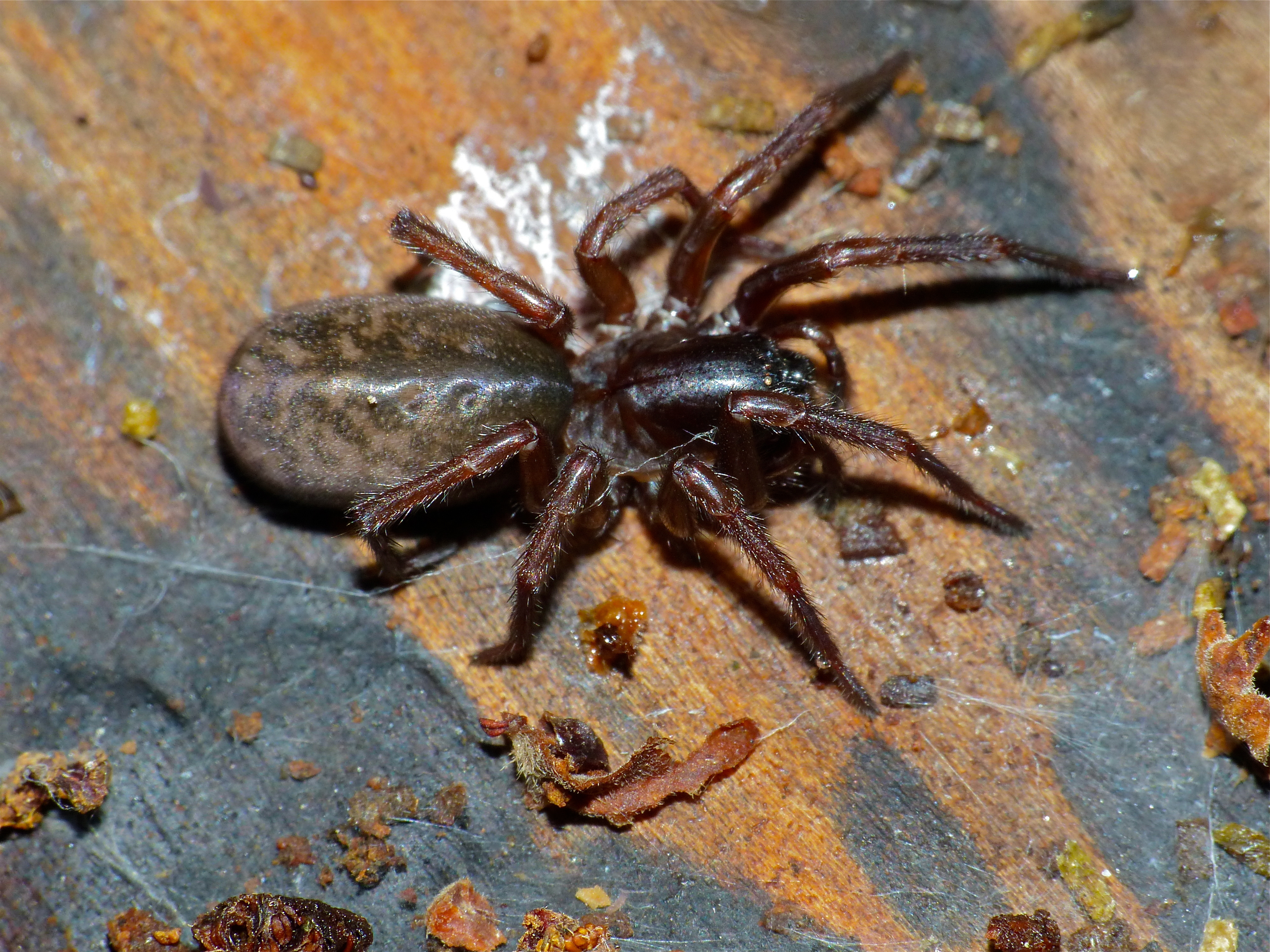
Coelotes terrestris

Coelotes Blackwall, 1841

- Coelotes acerbus Liu, Li & Pham, 2010 — Vietnam
- Coelotes adnexus Zhang, Zhu & Wang, 2017 — China
- Coelotes aguniensis Shimojana, 2000 — Japan (Ryukyu Is.)
- Coelotes akakinaensis Shimojana, 2000 — Japan (Ryukyu Is.)
- Coelotes albimontanus Nishikawa, 2009 — Japan
- Coelotes alpinus Polenec, 1972 — Italy, Austria, Slovenia
- Coelotes amamiensis Shimojana, 1989 — Japan (Ryukyu Is.)
- Coelotes amplilamnis Saito, 1936 — China
- Coelotes antri (Komatsu, 1961) — Japan
- Coelotes arganoi Brignoli, 1978 — Turkey
- Coelotes aritai Nishikawa, 2009 — Japan
- Coelotes atropos (Walckenaer, 1830) (type) — Europe
- Coelotes bifurcatus Okumura & Ono, 2006 — Japan
- Coelotes biprocessis Zhang, Zhu & Wang, 2017 — China
- Coelotes brachiatus Wang, Yin, Peng & Xie, 1990 — China
- Coelotes brevis Xu & Li, 2007 — China
- Coelotes capacilimbus Xu & Li, 2006 — China
- Coelotes caudatus de Blauwe, 1973 — Lebanon
- Coelotes cavicola (Komatsu, 1961) — Japan
- Coelotes charitonovi Spassky, 1939 — Central Asia
- Coelotes chenzhou Zhang & Yin, 2001 — China
- Coelotes chishuiensis Zhang, Zhu & Wang, 2017 — China
- Coelotes coenobita Brignoli, 1978 — Turkey
- Coelotes colosseus Xu & Li, 2007 — China
- Coelotes conversus Xu & Li, 2006 — China
- Coelotes cornutus Nishikawa, 2009 — Japan
- Coelotes cristiformis Jiang, Chen & Zhang, 2018 — China
- Coelotes curvilamnis Ovtchinnikov, 2000 — Kyrgyzstan
- Coelotes curvilamnis alatauensis Ovtchinnikov, 2000 — Kazakhstan, Kyrgyzstan
- Coelotes curvilamnis boomensis Ovtchinnikov, 2000 — Kyrgyzstan
- Coelotes cylistus Peng & Wang, 1997 — China
- Coelotes decolor Nishikawa, 1973 — Japan
- Coelotes degeneratus Liu & Li, 2009 — China
- Coelotes doii Nishikawa, 2009 — Japan
- Coelotes dormans Nishikawa, 2009 — Japan
- Coelotes eharai Arita, 1976 — Japan
- Coelotes enasanus Nishikawa, 2009 — Japan
- Coelotes everesti Hu, 2001 — China
- Coelotes exaptus Banks, 1898 — Mexico
- Coelotes exilis Nishikawa, 2009 — Japan
- Coelotes exitialis L. Koch, 1878 — Korea, Japan
- Coelotes fanjingensis Zhang, Zhu & Wang, 2017 — China
- Coelotes fujian Zhang, Zhu & Wang, 2017 — China
- Coelotes furvus Liu, Li & Pham, 2010 — Vietnam
- Coelotes galeiformis Wang, Yin, Peng & Xie, 1990 — China
- Coelotes gifuensis Nishikawa, 2009 — Japan
- Coelotes globasus (Wang, Peng & Kim, 1996) — China
- Coelotes gotoensis Okumura, 2007 — Japan
- Coelotes guttatus Wang, Yin, Peng & Xie, 1990 — China
- Coelotes hachijoensis Ono, 2008 — Japan
- Coelotes hamamurai Yaginuma, 1967 — Japan
- Coelotes hataensis Nishikawa, 2009 — Japan
- Coelotes hexommatus (Komatsu, 1957) — Japan
- Coelotes hikonensis Nishikawa, 2009 — Japan
- Coelotes hiradoensis Okumura & Ono, 2006 — Japan
- Coelotes hiratsukai Arita, 1976 — Japan
- Coelotes hiruzenensis Nishikawa, 2009 — Japan
- Coelotes hiurai Nishikawa, 2009 — Japan
- Coelotes ibukiensis Nishikawa, 2009 — Japan
- Coelotes icohamatus Zhu & Wang, 1991 — China
- Coelotes iharai Okumura, 2007 — Japan
- Coelotes iheyaensis Shimojana, 2000 — Japan (Ryukyu Is.)
- Coelotes ikiensis Nishikawa, 2009 — Japan
- Coelotes improprius (Wang, Griswold & Miller, 2010) — China
- Coelotes indentatus Zhang, Zhu & Wang, 2017 — China
- Coelotes insulanus Shimojana, 2000 — Japan (Ryukyu Is.)
- Coelotes introhamatus Xu & Li, 2006 — China
- Coelotes iriei Okumura, 2013 — Japan
- Coelotes italicus Kritscher, 1956 — Italy
- Coelotes iyoensis Nishikawa, 2009 — Japan
- Coelotes izenaensis Shimojana, 2000 — Japan (Ryukyu Is.)
- Coelotes jianfenglingensis (Liu & Li, 2009) — China
- Coelotes juglandicola Ovtchinnikov, 1984 — Kyrgyzstan
- Coelotes kagaensis Nishikawa, 2009 — Japan
- Coelotes kakeromaensis Shimojana, 2000 — Japan (Ryukyu Is.)
- Coelotes katsurai Nishikawa, 2009 — Japan
- Coelotes keramaensis Shimojana, 2000 — Japan (Ryukyu Is.)
- Coelotes kimi Kim & Park, 2009 — Korea
- Coelotes kintaroi Nishikawa, 1983 — Japan
- Coelotes kirgisicus Ovtchinnikov, 2000 — Kyrgyzstan
- Coelotes kitazawai Yaginuma, 1972 — Japan
- Coelotes koshikiensis Okumura, 2013 — Japan
- Coelotes kumejimanus Shimojana, 2000 — Japan (Ryukyu Is.)
- Coelotes kumensis Shimojana, 1989 — Japan (Ryukyu Is.)
- Coelotes lamellatus Nishikawa, 2009 — Japan
- Coelotes laohuanglongensis Liu & Li, 2009 — China
- Coelotes ledongensis Zhang, Zhu & Wang, 2017 — China
- Coelotes luculli Brignoli, 1978 — Turkey
- Coelotes maculatus Zhang, Peng & Kim, 1997 — China
- Coelotes mastrucatus Wang, Yin, Peng & Xie, 1990 — China
- Coelotes mediocris Kulczyński, 1887 — Switzerland, Italy, Ukraine?
- Coelotes micado Strand, 1907 — Japan
- Coelotes microps Schenkel, 1963 — China
- Coelotes minobusanus Nishikawa, 2009 — Japan
- Coelotes minoensis Nishikawa, 2009 — Japan
- Coelotes miyakoensis Shimojana, 2000 — Japan (Ryukyu Is.)
- Coelotes modestus Simon, 1880 — China, Japan
- Coelotes mohrii Nishikawa, 2009 — Japan
- Coelotes motobuensis Shimojana, 2000 — Japan (Ryukyu Is.)
- Coelotes multannulatus Zhang, Zhu, Sun & Song, 2006 — China
- Coelotes musashiensis Nishikawa, 1989 — Japan
- Coelotes nagaraensis Nishikawa, 2009 — Japan
- Coelotes nasensis Shimojana, 2000 — Japan (Ryukyu Is.)
- Coelotes nazuna Nishikawa, 2009 — Japan
- Coelotes nenilini Ovtchinnikov, 1999 — Uzbekistan
- Coelotes ningmingensis Peng, Yan, Liu & Kim, 1998 — China
- Coelotes noctulus Wang, Yin, Peng & Xie, 1990 — China
- Coelotes notoensis Nishikawa, 2009 — Japan
- Coelotes obako Nishikawa, 1983 — Japan
- Coelotes obtusangulus Luo & Chen, 2015 — China
- Coelotes ogatai Nishikawa, 2009 — Japan
- Coelotes okinawensis Shimojana, 1989 — Japan (Ryukyu Is.)
- Coelotes osamui Nishikawa, 2009 — Japan
- Coelotes osellai de Blauwe, 1973 — Italy
- Coelotes oshimaensis Shimojana, 2000 — Japan (Ryukyu Is.)
- Coelotes oxyacanthus Okumura, 2013 — Japan
- Coelotes pabulator Simon, 1875 — France, Switzerland
- Coelotes pastoralis Ovtchinnikov, 2000 — Kazakhstan, Kyrgyzstan
- Coelotes pedodentalis Zhang, Zhu, Sun & Song, 2006 — China
- Coelotes perbrevis Liu, Li & Pham, 2010 — Vietnam
- Coelotes personatus Nishikawa, 1973 — Japan
- Coelotes pervicax Hu & Li, 1987 — China
- Coelotes phthisicus Brignoli, 1978 — Turkey
- Coelotes pickardi O. Pickard-Cambridge, 1873 — Switzerland, Italy
- Coelotes pickardi carpathensis Ovtchinnikov, 1999 — Ukraine
- Coelotes pickardi pastor Simon, 1875 — France
- Coelotes pickardi tirolensis (Kulczyński, 1906) — Switzerland, Italy, Ukraine?
- Coelotes poleneci Wiehle, 1964 — Austria, Slovenia
- Coelotes polyedricus Liu, Li & Pham, 2010 — Vietnam
- Coelotes poricus Zhang, Zhu & Wang, 2017 — China
- Coelotes poweri Simon, 1875 — France
- Coelotes processus Xu & Li, 2007 — China
- Coelotes progressoridentes Ovtchinnikov, 2000 — Kyrgyzstan
- Coelotes quadratus Wang, Yin, Peng & Xie, 1990 — China
- Coelotes rhododendri Brignoli, 1978 — Turkey
- Coelotes robustior Nishikawa, 2009 — Japan
- Coelotes robustus Wang, Yin, Peng & Xie, 1990 — China
- Coelotes rudolfi (Schenkel, 1925) — Switzerland
- Coelotes rugosus (Wang, Peng & Kim, 1996) — China
- Coelotes saccatus Peng & Yin, 1998 — China
- Coelotes saikaiensis Okumura, 2013 — Japan
- Coelotes sanoi Nishikawa, 2009 — Japan
- Coelotes sawadai Nishikawa, 2009 — Japan
- Coelotes septus Wang, Yin, Peng & Xie, 1990 — China
- Coelotes serpentinus Jiang, Chen & Zhang, 2018 — China
- Coelotes shimajiriensis Shimojana, 2000 — Japan (Ryukyu Is.)
- Coelotes simplex O. Pickard-Cambridge, 1885 — China (Yarkand)
- Coelotes sinopensis Danişman, Karanfil & Coşar, 2016 — Turkey
- Coelotes sinuolatus Zhang, Zhu & Wang, 2017 — China
- Coelotes solitarius L. Koch, 1868 — Europe
- Coelotes songae Liu, Li & Pham, 2010 — Vietnam
- Coelotes sordidus Ovtchinnikov, 2000 — Kazakhstan, Kyrgyzstan
- Coelotes striatilamnis Ovtchinnikov, 2000 — Kazakhstan, Kyrgyzstan
- Coelotes striatilamnis ketmenensis Ovtchinnikov, 2001 — Kazakhstan
- Coelotes stylifer Caporiacco, 1935 — Kashmir
- Coelotes suruga Nishikawa, 2009 — Japan
- Coelotes suthepicus Dankittipakul, Chami-Kranon & Wang, 2005 — Thailand
- Coelotes takanawaensis Nishikawa, 2009 — Japan
- Coelotes taurus Nishikawa, 2009 — Japan
- Coelotes tegenarioides O. Pickard-Cambridge, 1885 — China (Yarkand)
- Coelotes tenutubilaris Zhang, Zhu & Wang, 2017 — China
- Coelotes terrestris (Wider, 1834) — Europe, Turkey
- Coelotes tiantangensis Luo & Chen, 2015 — China
- Coelotes tiantongensis Zhang, Peng & Kim, 1997 — China
- Coelotes titaniacus Brignoli, 1977 — Greece
- Coelotes tochigiensis Nishikawa, 2009 — Japan
- Coelotes tojoi Nishikawa, 2009 — Japan
- Coelotes tokaraensis Shimojana, 2000 — Japan (Ryukyu Is.)
- Coelotes tokunoshimaensis Shimojana, 2000 — Japan (Ryukyu Is.)
- Coelotes tominagai Nishikawa, 2009 — Japan
- Coelotes tonakiensis Shimojana, 2000 — Japan (Ryukyu Is.)
- Coelotes transiliensis Ovtchinnikov, 2000 — Kazakhstan, Kyrgyzstan
- Coelotes troglocaecus Shimojana & Nishihira, 2000 — Japan (Okinawa)
- Coelotes turkestanicus Ovtchinnikov, 1999 — Russia (Europe) to Central Asia
- Coelotes uncatus Liu & Li, 2009 — China
- Coelotes undulatus Hu & Wang, 1990 — China
- Coelotes unicatus Yaginuma, 1977 — Japan
- Coelotes unzenensis Okumura, 2013 — Japan
- Coelotes uozumii Nishikawa, 2002 — Japan
- Coelotes vallei Brignoli, 1977 — Italy
- Coelotes vestigialis Xu & Li, 2007 — China
- Coelotes vignai Brignoli, 1978 — Turkey
- Coelotes wangi Chen & Zhao, 1997 — China
- Coelotes xinjiangensis Hu, 1992 — China
- Coelotes yaginumai Nishikawa, 1972 — Japan
- Coelotes yahagiensis Nishikawa, 2009 — Japan
- Coelotes yambaruensis Shimojana, 2000 — Japan (Ryukyu Is.)
- Coelotes yodoensis Nishikawa, 1977 — Japan
- Coelotes zaoensis Nishikawa, 2009 — Japan

=== Coras ===
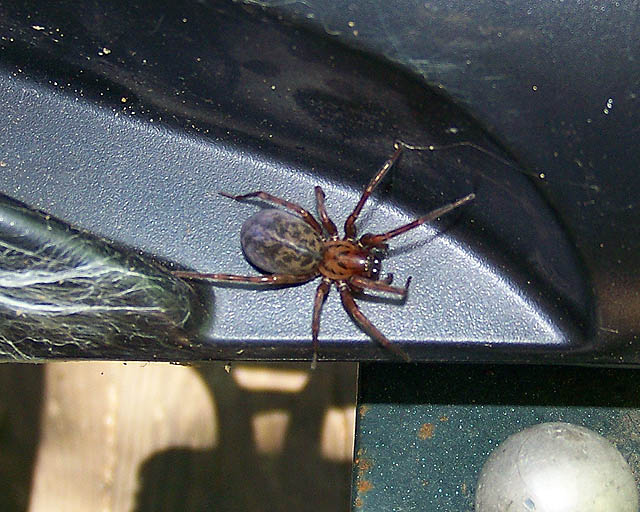
Coras medicinalis

Coras Simon, 1898

- Coras aerialis Muma, 1946 — USA
- Coras alabama Muma, 1946 — USA
- Coras angularis Muma, 1944 — USA
- Coras cavernorum Barrows, 1940 — USA
- Coras crescentis Muma, 1944 — USA
- Coras furcatus Muma, 1946 — USA
- Coras juvenilis (Keyserling, 1881) — USA
- Coras kisatchie Muma, 1946 — USA
- Coras lamellosus (Keyserling, 1887) — USA
- Coras medicinalis (Hentz, 1821) (type) — USA, Canada
- Coras montanus (Emerton, 1890) — USA, Canada
- Coras parallelis Muma, 1944 — USA
- Coras perplexus Muma, 1946 — USA
- Coras seorakensis Seo, 2014 — Korea
- Coras taugynus Chamberlin, 1925 — USA
- Coras tennesseensis Muma, 1946 — USA

== D ==
=== Dichodactylus ===
Dichodactylus Okumura, 2017

- Dichodactylus inabaensis (Arita, 1974) — Japan
- Dichodactylus satoi (Nishikawa, 2003) — Japan
- Dichodactylus shinshuensis Okumura, 2017 — Japan
- Dichodactylus tarumii (Arita, 1976) (type) — Japan

=== Draconarius ===
Draconarius Ovtchinnikov, 1999

- Draconarius abbreviatus Dankittipakul & Wang, 2003 — Thailand
- Draconarius absentis Wang, 2003 — China
- Draconarius acidentatus (Peng & Yin, 1998) — China
- Draconarius acroprocessus Zhang, Zhu & Wang, 2017 — China
- Draconarius acutus Xu & Li, 2008 — China
- Draconarius adligansus (Peng & Yin, 1998) — China
- Draconarius adnatus Wang, Griswold & Miller, 2010 — China
- Draconarius agrestis Wang, 2003 — China
- Draconarius altissimus (Hu, 2001) — China
- Draconarius anceps Wang, Griswold & Miller, 2010 — China
- Draconarius anthonyi Dankittipakul & Wang, 2003 — Thailand
- Draconarius arcuatus (Chen, 1984) — China
- Draconarius argenteus (Wang, Yin, Peng & Xie, 1990) — China
- Draconarius aspinatus (Wang, Yin, Peng & Xie, 1990) — China
- Draconarius auriculatus Xu & Li, 2006 — China
- Draconarius auriformis Xu & Li, 2007 — China
- Draconarius australis Dankittipakul, Sonthichai & Wang, 2006 — Thailand
- Draconarius bannaensis Liu & Li, 2010 — China
- Draconarius baronii (Brignoli, 1978) — Bhutan
- Draconarius baxiantaiensis Wang, 2003 — China
- Draconarius beloniforis Wang & Martens, 2009 — Nepal
- Draconarius bifarius Wang & Martens, 2009 — Nepal
- Draconarius bituberculatus (Wang, Yin, Peng & Xie, 1990) — China
- Draconarius bounnami Wang & Jäger, 2008 — Laos
- Draconarius brachialis Xu & Li, 2007 — China
- Draconarius brevikarenos Wang & Martens, 2009 — Nepal
- Draconarius brunneus (Hu & Li, 1987) — China
- Draconarius calcariformis (Wang, 1994) — China
- Draconarius cangshanensis Zhang, Zhu & Wang, 2017 — China
- Draconarius capitellus Wang & Martens, 2009 — Nepal
- Draconarius carinatus (Wang, Yin, Peng & Xie, 1990) — China
- Draconarius catillus Wang, Griswold & Miller, 2010 — China
- Draconarius cavernalis (Huang, Peng & Li, 2002) — China
- Draconarius cavus Zhang, Zhu & Wang, 2017 — China
- Draconarius chaiqiaoensis (Zhang, Peng & Kim, 1997) — China
- Draconarius cheni (Platnick, 1989) — China
- Draconarius chuandian Zhang, Zhu & Wang, 2017 — China
- Draconarius clavellatus Liu, Li & Pham, 2010 — Vietnam
- Draconarius cochleariformis Liu & Li, 2009 — China
- Draconarius colubrinus Zhang, Zhu & Song, 2002 — China
- Draconarius communis Wang & Martens, 2009 — Nepal
- Draconarius complanatus Xu & Li, 2008 — China
- Draconarius condocephalus Wang & Martens, 2009 — Nepal
- Draconarius confusus Wang & Martens, 2009 — Nepal
- Draconarius contiguus Wang & Martens, 2009 — Nepal
- Draconarius coreanus (Paik & Yaginuma, 1969) — Korea, Japan
- Draconarius cucphuongensis Liu, Li & Pham, 2010 — Vietnam
- Draconarius cucullatus Zhang, Zhu & Wang, 2017 — China
- Draconarius curiosus Wang, 2003 — China
- Draconarius curvabilis Wang & Jäger, 2007 — China
- Draconarius curvus Wang, Griswold & Miller, 2010 — China
- Draconarius cylindratus Wang & Martens, 2009 — Nepal
- Draconarius dapaensis Wang & Martens, 2009 — Nepal
- Draconarius davidi (Schenkel, 1963) — China
- Draconarius denisi (Schenkel, 1963) — China
- Draconarius dialeptus Okumura, 2013 — Japan
- Draconarius digituliscaput Chen, Zhu & Kim, 2008 — China
- Draconarius digitusiformis (Wang, Yin, Peng & Xie, 1990) — China
- Draconarius disgregus Wang, 2003 — China
- Draconarius dissitus Wang, 2003 — China
- Draconarius distinctus Wang & Martens, 2009 — Nepal
- Draconarius dorsicephalus Wang & Martens, 2009 — Nepal
- Draconarius dorsiprocessus Zhang, Zhu & Wang, 2017 — China
- Draconarius drepanoides Jiang & Chen, 2015 — China
- Draconarius dubius Wang, 2003 — China
- Draconarius duplus Wang, Griswold & Miller, 2010 — China
- Draconarius elatus Dankittipakul & Wang, 2004 — Thailand
- Draconarius ellipticus Liu, Li & Pham, 2010 — Vietnam
- Draconarius episomos Wang, 2003 — China
- Draconarius euryembolus Wang, Griswold & Miller, 2010 — China
- Draconarius exiguus Liu & Li, 2010 — China
- Draconarius expansus Xu & Li, 2008 — China
- Draconarius flos Wang & Jäger, 2007 — China
- Draconarius gigas Wang, Griswold & Miller, 2010 — China
- Draconarius globulatus Chami-Kranon, Sonthichai & Wang, 2006 — Thailand
- Draconarius gorkhaensis Wang & Martens, 2009 — Nepal
- Draconarius griswoldi Wang, 2003 — China
- Draconarius guizhouensis (Peng, Li & Huang, 2002) — China
- Draconarius guoi Wang, Griswold & Miller, 2010 — China
- Draconarius gurkha (Brignoli, 1976) — Nepal
- Draconarius gyriniformis (Wang & Zhu, 1991) — China
- Draconarius hallaensis Kim & Lee, 2007 — Korea
- Draconarius hangzhouensis (Chen, 1984) — China
- Draconarius hanoiensis Wang & Jäger, 2008 — Vietnam
- Draconarius haopingensis Wang, 2003 — China
- Draconarius harduarae (Biswas & Roy, 2008) — India
- Draconarius hengshanensis (Tang & Yin, 2003) — China
- Draconarius himalayaensis (Hu, 2001) — China
- Draconarius hui (Dankittipakul & Wang, 2003) — China
- Draconarius huizhunesis (Wang & Xu, 1988) — China
- Draconarius huongsonensis Wang & Jäger, 2008 — Vietnam
- Draconarius immensus Xu & Li, 2006 — China
- Draconarius indistinctus (Xu & Li, 2006) — China
- Draconarius infulatus (Wang, Yin, Peng & Xie, 1990) — China
- Draconarius inthanonensis Dankittipakul & Wang, 2003 — Thailand
- Draconarius jiafu Zhang, Zhu & Wang, 2017 — China
- Draconarius jiangyongensis (Peng, Gong & Kim, 1996) — China
- Draconarius joshimath Quasin, Siliwal & Uniyal, 2017 — India
- Draconarius kavanaughi Wang, Griswold & Miller, 2010 — China
- Draconarius kayasanensis (Paik, 1972) — Korea
- Draconarius labiatus (Wang & Ono, 1998) — Taiwan
- Draconarius latellai Marusik & Ballarin, 2011 — Pakistan
- Draconarius lateralis Dankittipakul & Wang, 2004 — Thailand
- Draconarius laticavus Wang, Griswold & Miller, 2010 — China
- Draconarius latidens Wang & Jäger, 2008 — Laos
- Draconarius latiforus Wang & Martens, 2009 — Nepal
- Draconarius latisectus Zhang, Zhu & Wang, 2017 — China
- Draconarius levyi Wang, Griswold & Miller, 2010 — China
- Draconarius lhasa Zhang, Zhu & Wang, 2017 — China
- Draconarius lini Liu & Li, 2009 — China
- Draconarius linxiaensis Wang, 2003 — China
- Draconarius linzhiensis (Hu, 2001) — China
- Draconarius longissimus Liu, Li & Pham, 2010 — Vietnam
- Draconarius longlingensis Wang, Griswold & Miller, 2010 — China
- Draconarius lunularis Zhang, Zhu & Wang, 2017 — China
- Draconarius lutulentus (Wang, Yin, Peng & Xie, 1990) — China
- Draconarius magicus Liu, Li & Pham, 2010 — Vietnam
- Draconarius magnarcuatus Xu & Li, 2008 — China
- Draconarius magniceps (Schenkel, 1936) — China
- Draconarius manus Wang & Zhang, 2018 — China
- Draconarius medogensis Zhang, Zhu & Wang, 2017 — China
- Draconarius meganiger Wang & Martens, 2009 — Nepal
- Draconarius microcoelotes Wang & Martens, 2009 — Nepal
- Draconarius mikrommatos Wang, Griswold & Miller, 2010 — China
- Draconarius molluscus (Wang, Yin, Peng & Xie, 1990) — China
- Draconarius monticola Dankittipakul, Sonthichai & Wang, 2006 — Thailand
- Draconarius montis Dankittipakul, Sonthichai & Wang, 2006 — Thailand
- Draconarius multidentatus Zhang, Zhu & Wang, 2017 — China
- Draconarius mupingensis Xu & Li, 2006 — China
- Draconarius nanyuensis (Peng & Yin, 1998) — China
- Draconarius naranensis Ovtchinnikov, 2005 — Pakistan
- Draconarius neixiangensis (Hu, Wang & Wang, 1991) — China
- Draconarius nudulus Wang, 2003 — China
- Draconarius olorinus Wang, Griswold & Miller, 2010 — China
- Draconarius orbiculatus Zhu, Wang & Zhang, 2017 — China
- Draconarius ornatus (Wang, Yin, Peng & Xie, 1990) — China
- Draconarius ovillus Xu & Li, 2007 — China
- Draconarius pakistanicus Ovtchinnikov, 2005 — Pakistan
- Draconarius panchtharensis Wang & Martens, 2009 — Nepal
- Draconarius papai Chami-Kranon, Sonthichai & Wang, 2006 — Thailand
- Draconarius papillatus Xu & Li, 2006 — China
- Draconarius paracidentatus Zhang, Zhu & Wang, 2017 — China
- Draconarius paraepisomos Wang & Martens, 2009 — Nepal
- Draconarius paralateralis Dankittipakul & Wang, 2004 — Thailand
- Draconarius paralleloides Jiang, Chen & Zhang, 2018 — China
- Draconarius parallelus Liu & Li, 2009 — China
- Draconarius paralutulentus Zhang, Zhu & Wang, 2017 — China
- Draconarius paraspiralis Wang, Griswold & Miller, 2010 — China
- Draconarius paraterebratus Wang, 2003 — China
- Draconarius paratrifasciatus Wang & Jäger, 2007 — China
- Draconarius penicillatus (Wang, Yin, Peng & Xie, 1990) — China
- Draconarius peregrinus Xie & Chen, 2011 — China
- Draconarius phuhin Dankittipakul, Sonthichai & Wang, 2006 — Thailand
- Draconarius phulchokiensis Wang & Martens, 2009 — Nepal
- Draconarius pictus (Hu, 2001) — China
- Draconarius pinguis Jiang, Chen & Zhang, 2018 — China
- Draconarius pollex Zhang, Zhu & Wang, 2017 — China
- Draconarius postremus Wang & Jäger, 2008 — Laos
- Draconarius potanini (Schenkel, 1963) — China
- Draconarius prolixus (Wang, Yin, Peng & Xie, 1990) — China
- Draconarius promontorioides Dankittipakul & Wang, 2008 — Thailand
- Draconarius promontorius Dankittipakul, Sonthichai & Wang, 2006 — Thailand
- Draconarius pseudoagrestis Wang, Griswold & Miller, 2010 — China
- Draconarius pseudoclavellatus Liu, Li & Pham, 2010 — Vietnam
- Draconarius pseudocoreanus Xu & Li, 2008 — China
- Draconarius pseudodissitus Zhang, Zhu & Wang, 2017 — China
- Draconarius pseudogurkha Wang & Martens, 2009 — Nepal
- Draconarius pseudolateralis Dankittipakul & Wang, 2004 — Thailand
- Draconarius pseudomeganiger Wang & Martens, 2009 — Nepal
- Draconarius pseudopumilus Liu, Li & Pham, 2010 — Vietnam
- Draconarius pseudospiralis Wang, Griswold & Miller, 2010 — China
- Draconarius pseudowuermlii Wang, 2003 — China
- Draconarius pumilus Liu, Li & Pham, 2010 — Vietnam
- Draconarius qingzangensis (Hu, 2001) — China
- Draconarius quattour Wang, Griswold & Miller, 2010 — China
- Draconarius renalis Wang, Griswold & Miller, 2010 — China
- Draconarius retrotubularis Zhang, Zhu & Wang, 2017 — China
- Draconarius rimatus Liu, Li & Pham, 2010 — Vietnam
- Draconarius rotulus Liu, Li & Pham, 2010 — Vietnam
- Draconarius rotundus Wang, 2003 — China
- Draconarius rufulus (Wang, Yin, Peng & Xie, 1990) — China
- Draconarius sacculus Wang & Martens, 2009 — Nepal
- Draconarius schawalleri Wang & Martens, 2009 — Nepal
- Draconarius schenkeli (Brignoli, 1978) — Bhutan
- Draconarius schwendingeri Dankittipakul, Sonthichai & Wang, 2006 — Thailand
- Draconarius semicircularis Liu & Li, 2009 — China
- Draconarius semicirculus Wang & Martens, 2009 — Nepal
- Draconarius seorsus Wang & Martens, 2009 — Nepal
- Draconarius siamensis Dankittipakul & Wang, 2003 — Thailand
- Draconarius sichuanensis Wang & Jäger, 2007 — China
- Draconarius silva Dankittipakul, Sonthichai & Wang, 2006 — Thailand
- Draconarius silvicola Dankittipakul, Sonthichai & Wang, 2006 — Thailand
- Draconarius simplicidens Wang, 2003 — China
- Draconarius simplicifolis Wang & Martens, 2009 — Nepal
- Draconarius singulatus (Wang, Yin, Peng & Xie, 1990) — China
- Draconarius songi Wang & Jäger, 2008 — Laos
- Draconarius specialis Xu & Li, 2007 — China
- Draconarius spinosus Wang & Martens, 2009 — Nepal
- Draconarius spiralis Wang, Griswold & Miller, 2010 — China
- Draconarius spirallus Xu & Li, 2007 — China
- Draconarius stemmleri (Brignoli, 1978) — Bhutan
- Draconarius streptus (Zhu & Wang, 1994) — China
- Draconarius striolatus (Wang, Yin, Peng & Xie, 1990) — China
- Draconarius strophadatus (Zhu & Wang, 1991) — China
- Draconarius subabsentis Xu & Li, 2008 — China
- Draconarius subaspinatus Zhang, Zhu & Wang, 2017 — China
- Draconarius subconfusus Wang & Martens, 2009 — Nepal
- Draconarius subdissitus Zhang, Zhu & Wang, 2017 — China
- Draconarius subepisomos Wang & Martens, 2009 — Nepal
- Draconarius sublutulentus Xu & Li, 2008 — China
- Draconarius subrotundus Wang & Martens, 2009 — Nepal
- Draconarius subterebratus Zhang, Zhu & Wang, 2017 — China
- Draconarius subtitanus (Hu, 1992) — China
- Draconarius subulatus Dankittipakul & Wang, 2003 — Thailand
- Draconarius suttisani Dankittipakul & Wang, 2008 — Thailand
- Draconarius syzygiatus (Zhu & Wang, 1994) — China
- Draconarius tabularis Wang & Jäger, 2008 — Laos
- Draconarius tabulatus Zhang, Zhu & Wang, 2017 — China
- Draconarius taihangensis Zhang, Zhu & Wang, 2017 — China
- Draconarius tamdaoensis Liu, Li & Pham, 2010 — Vietnam
- Draconarius tangi Wang, Griswold & Miller, 2010 — China
- Draconarius taplejungensis Wang & Martens, 2009 — Nepal
- Draconarius tensus Xu & Li, 2008 — China
- Draconarius tentus Dankittipakul, Sonthichai & Wang, 2006 — Thailand
- Draconarius terebratus (Peng & Wang, 1997) — China
- Draconarius testudinatus Wang & Martens, 2009 — Nepal
- Draconarius tianlin Zhang, Zhu & Wang, 2017 — China
- Draconarius tiantangensis Xie & Chen, 2011 — China
- Draconarius tibetensis Wang, 2003 — China
- Draconarius tinjuraensis Wang & Martens, 2009 — Nepal
- Draconarius tongi Xu & Li, 2007 — China
- Draconarius transparens Liu, Li & Pham, 2010 — Vietnam
- Draconarius transversus Liu, Li & Pham, 2010 — Vietnam
- Draconarius triatus (Zhu & Wang, 1994) — China
- Draconarius tridens Wang, Griswold & Miller, 2010 — China
- Draconarius trifasciatus (Wang & Zhu, 1991) — China
- Draconarius trinus Wang & Jäger, 2007 — China
- Draconarius tritos Wang & Martens, 2009 — Nepal
- Draconarius tryblionatus (Wang & Zhu, 1991) — China
- Draconarius tubercularis Xu & Li, 2007 — China
- Draconarius turriformis Liu & Li, 2010 — China
- Draconarius uncinatus (Wang, Yin, Peng & Xie, 1990) — China
- Draconarius ventrifurcatus Xu & Li, 2008 — China
- Draconarius venustus Ovtchinnikov, 1999 (type) — Tajikistan
- Draconarius verrucifer Okumura, 2013 — Japan
- Draconarius volubilis Liu, Li & Pham, 2010 — Vietnam
- Draconarius volutobursarius Wang & Martens, 2009 — Nepal
- Draconarius wenzhouensis (Chen, 1984) — China
- Draconarius wolongensis Zhang, Zhu & Wang, 2017 — China
- Draconarius wrasei Wang & Jäger, 2010 — China
- Draconarius wudangensis (Chen & Zhao, 1997) — China
- Draconarius wuermlii (Brignoli, 1978) — Bhutan, Nepal
- Draconarius wugeshanensis (Zhang, Yin & Kim, 2000) — China
- Draconarius xishuiensis Zhang, Zhu & Wang, 2017 — China
- Draconarius xuae Wang, Griswold & Miller, 2010 — China
- Draconarius yadongensis (Hu & Li, 1987) — China, Nepal
- Draconarius yani Wang, Griswold & Miller, 2010 — China
- Draconarius yichengensis Wang, 2003 — China
- Draconarius zonalis Xu & Li, 2008 — China

== E ==
=== Eratigena ===
Eratigena

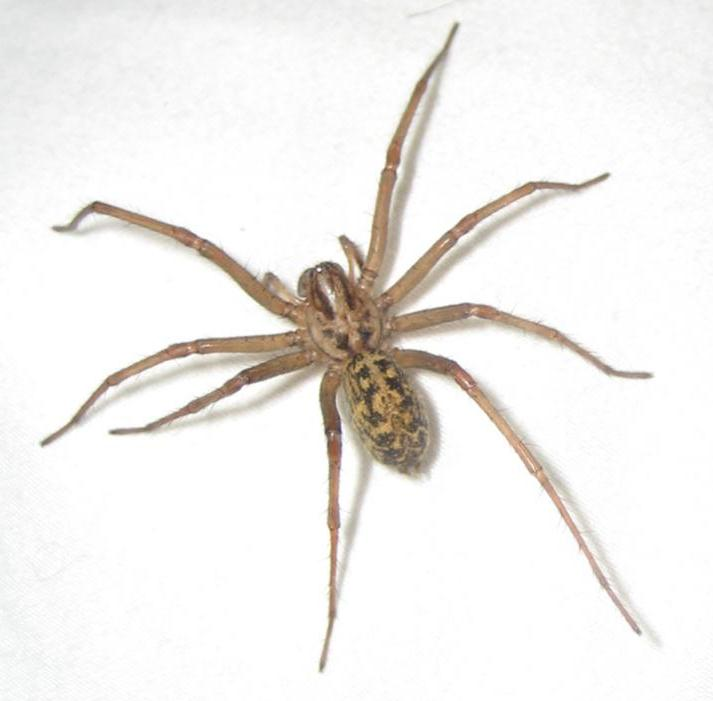
Hobo spider (Tegenaria agrestis)

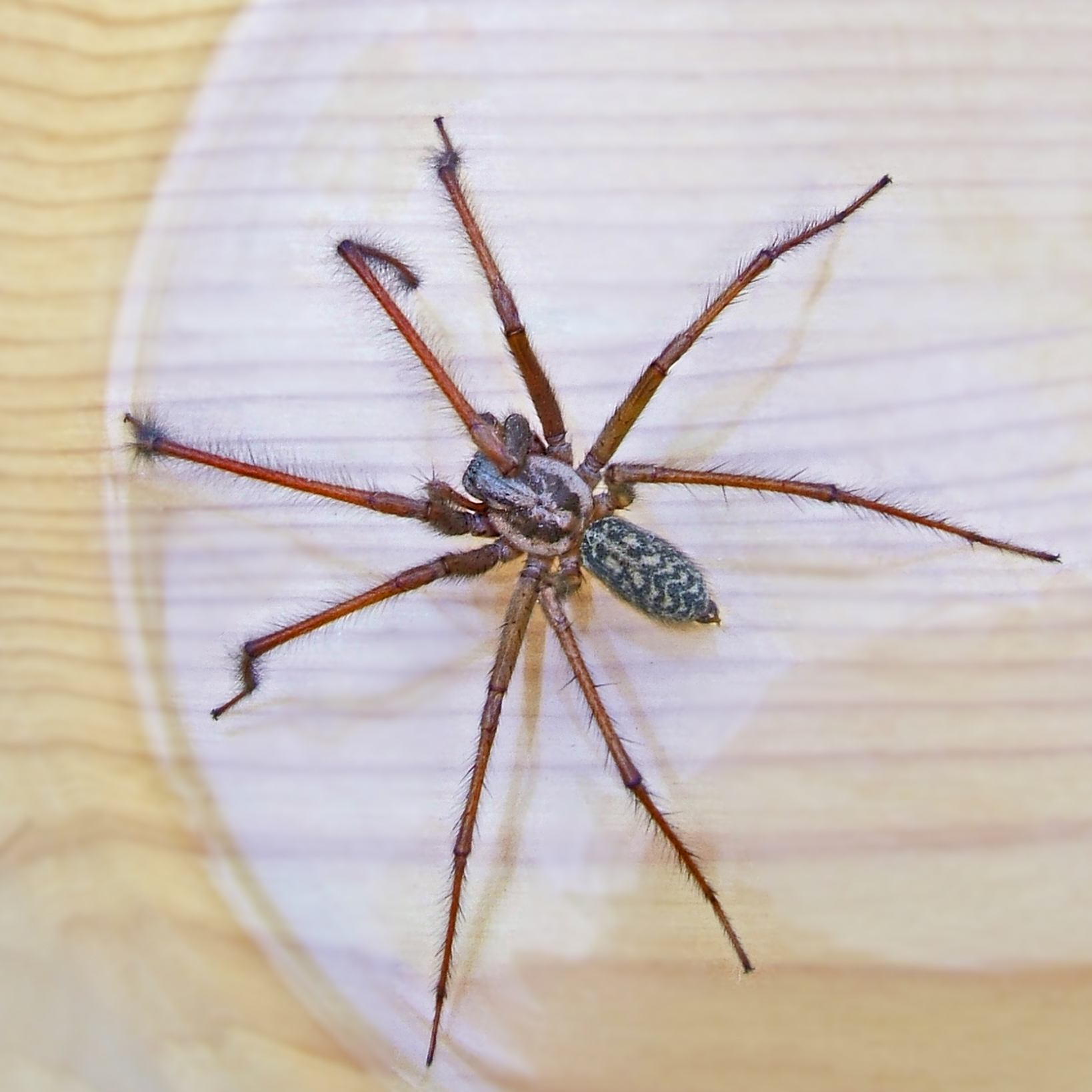
Eratigena atrica

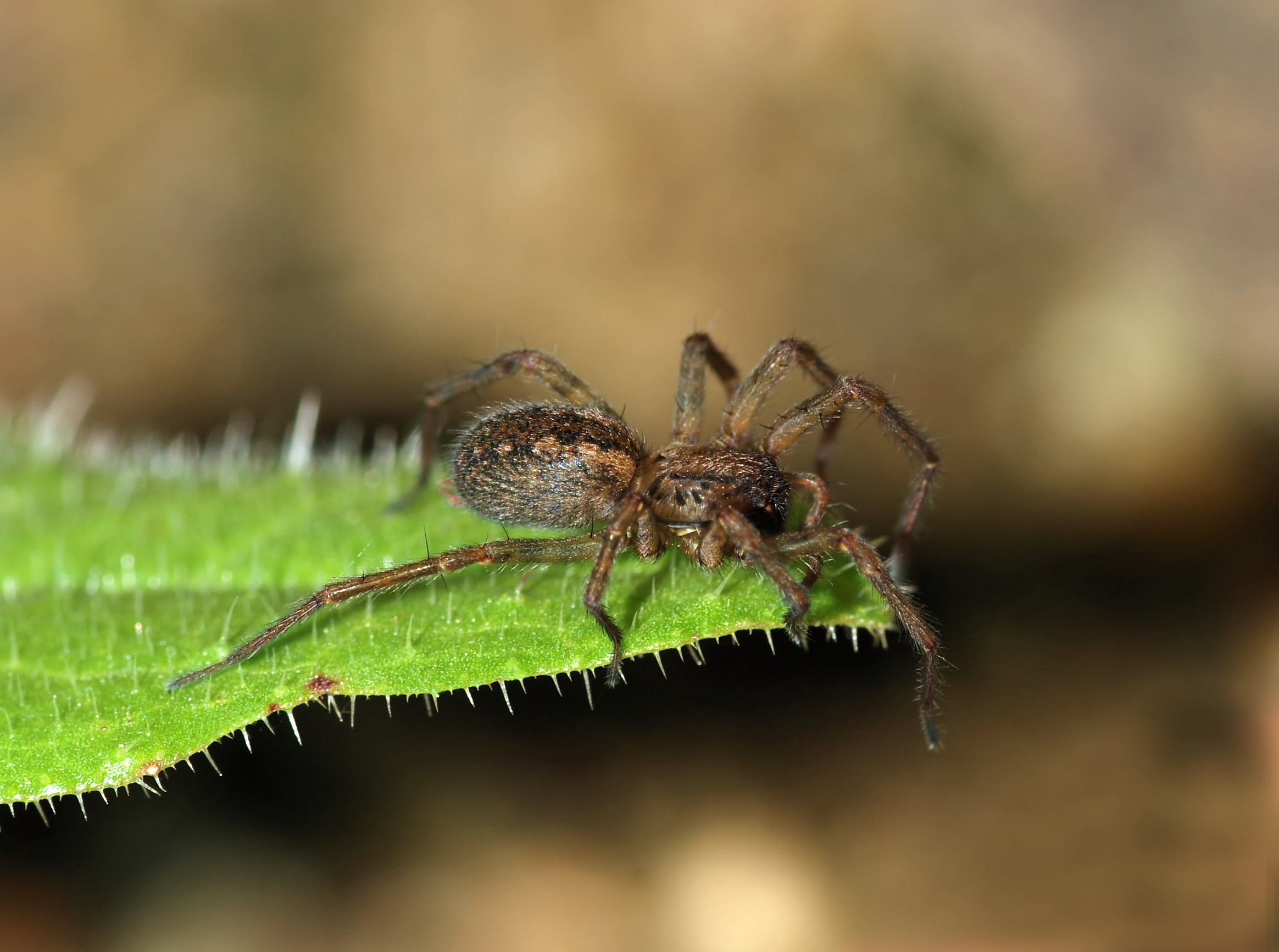
Eratigena feminea

Eratigena Bolzern, Burckhardt & Hänggi, 2013

- Eratigena agrestis (Walckenaer, 1802) — Europe to Central Asia. Introduced to USA, Canada
- Eratigena arganoi (Brignoli, 1971) — Italy
- Eratigena atrica (C. L. Koch, 1843) (type) — Europe. Introduced to Canada, USA
- Eratigena balearica (Brignoli, 1978) — Spain (Balearic Is.)
- Eratigena barrientosi (Bolzern, Crespo & Cardoso, 2009) — Portugal
- Eratigena blanda (Gertsch, 1971) — Mexico
- Eratigena bucculenta (L. Koch, 1868) — Portugal, Spain
- Eratigena caverna (Gertsch, 1971) — Mexico
- Eratigena decora (Gertsch, 1971) — Mexico
- Eratigena duellica (Simon, 1875) — Canada, USA, Europe
- Eratigena edmundoi Bolzern & Hänggi, 2016 — Mexico
- Eratigena feminea (Simon, 1870) — Portugal, Spain, Madeira, Algeria
- Eratigena fernandoi Bolzern & Hänggi, 2016 — Mexico
- Eratigena flexuosa (F. O. Pickard-Cambridge, 1902) — Mexico
- Eratigena florea (Brignoli, 1974) — Mexico
- Eratigena fuesslini (Pavesi, 1873) — Europe, Turkey
- Eratigena gertschi (Roth, 1968) — Mexico
- Eratigena guanato Bolzern & Hänggi, 2016 — Mexico
- Eratigena herculea (Fage, 1931) — Spain (mainland, Ibiza)
- Eratigena hispanica (Fage, 1931) — Spain
- Eratigena incognita (Bolzern, Crespo & Cardoso, 2009) — Portugal
- Eratigena inermis (Simon, 1870) — Portugal, Spain, France
- Eratigena laksao Bolzern & Jäger, 2015 — Laos
- Eratigena mexicana (Roth, 1968) — Mexico
- Eratigena montigena (Simon, 1937) — Portugal, Spain
- Eratigena picta (Simon, 1870) — Europe, North Africa, Caucasus
- Eratigena queretaro Bolzern & Hänggi, 2016 — Mexico
- Eratigena rothi (Gertsch, 1971) — Mexico
- Eratigena saeva (Blackwall, 1844) — Western Europe, Canada
- Eratigena sardoa (Brignoli, 1977) — Sardinia
- Eratigena selva (Roth, 1968) — Mexico
- Eratigena sicana (Brignoli, 1976) — Italy (Sicily, Sardinia)
- Eratigena tlaxcala (Roth, 1968) — Mexico
- Eratigena vidua (Cárdenas & Barrientos, 2011) — Spain
- Eratigena vomeroi (Brignoli, 1977) — Italy
- Eratigena xilitla Bolzern & Hänggi, 2016 — Mexico
- Eratigena yarini Bolzern & Hänggi, 2016 — Mexico

== F ==
=== Femoracoelotes ===
Femoracoelotes Wang, 2002

- Femoracoelotes latus (Wang, Tso & Wu, 2001) — Taiwan
- Femoracoelotes platnicki (Wang & Ono, 1998) (type) — Taiwan

=== Flexicoelotes ===
Flexicoelotes Chen, Li & Zhao, 2015

- Flexicoelotes huyunensis Chen & Li, 2015 — China
- Flexicoelotes jiaohanyanensis Chen & Li, 2015 (type) — China
- Flexicoelotes jinlongyanensis Chen & Li, 2015 — China
- Flexicoelotes pingzhaiensis Chen & Li, 2015 — China
- Flexicoelotes xingwangensis Chen & Li, 2015 — China

== G ==
=== Guilotes ===
Guilotes Zhao & S. Q. Li, 2018

- Guilotes ludiensis Zhao & S. Q. Li, 2018 (type) — China
- Guilotes qingshitanensis Zhao & S. Q. Li, 2018 — China
- Guilotes xingpingensis Zhao & S. Q. Li, 2018 — China
- Guilotes yandongensis Zhao & S. Q. Li, 2018 — China

== H ==
=== Hadites ===
Hadites Keyserling, 1862

- Hadites tegenarioides Keyserling, 1862 (type) — Croatia

=== Hengconarius ===
Hengconarius Zhao & S. Q. Li, 2018

- Hengconarius dedaensis Zhao & S. Q. Li, 2018 — China
- Hengconarius exilis (Zhang, Zhu & Wang, 2005) (type) — China
- Hengconarius falcatus (Xu & Li, 2006) — China
- Hengconarius incertus (Wang, 2003) — China
- Hengconarius latusincertus (Wang, Griswold & Miller, 2010) — China
- Hengconarius longipalpus Zhao & S. Q. Li, 2018 — China
- Hengconarius longpuensis Zhao & S. Q. Li, 2018 — China
- Hengconarius pseudobrunneus (Wang, 2003) — China

=== Himalcoelotes ===
Himalcoelotes Wang, 2002

- Himalcoelotes aequoreus Wang, 2002 — Nepal
- Himalcoelotes brignolii Wang, 2002 — Bhutan
- Himalcoelotes bursarius Wang, 2002 — Nepal
- Himalcoelotes diatropos Wang, 2002 — Nepal
- Himalcoelotes gyirongensis (Hu & Li, 1987) — China, Nepal
- Himalcoelotes martensi Wang, 2002 (type) — Nepal
- Himalcoelotes pirum Wang, 2002 — Nepal
- Himalcoelotes sherpa (Brignoli, 1976) — Nepal
- Himalcoelotes subsherpa Wang, 2002 — Nepal
- Himalcoelotes syntomos Wang, 2002 — Nepal
- Himalcoelotes tortuous Zhang & Zhu, 2010 — China
- Himalcoelotes xizangensis (Hu, 1992) — China
- Himalcoelotes zhamensis Zhang & Zhu, 2010 — China

=== Histopona ===
Histopona Thorell, 1869

- †Histopona anthracina Bertkau, 1878b — Neogene Rott, Germany
- Histopona bidens (Absolon & Kratochvíl, 1933) — Croatia, Macedonia
- Histopona breviemboli Dimitrov, Deltshev & Lazarov, 2017 — Bulgaria, Turkey (Europe)
- Histopona conveniens (Kulczyński, 1914) — Bosnia-Hercegovina
- Histopona dubia (Absolon & Kratochvíl, 1933) — Croatia, Bosnia-Hercegovina
- Histopona egonpretneri Deeleman-Reinhold, 1983 — Croatia
- Histopona fioni Bolzern, Pantini & Isaia, 2013 — Switzerland, Italy
- Histopona hauseri (Brignoli, 1972) — Greece, Macedonia
- Histopona isolata Deeleman-Reinhold, 1983 — Greece (Crete)
- Histopona italica Brignoli, 1977 — Italy
- Histopona krivosijana (Kratochvíl, 1935) — Montenegro
- Histopona kurkai Deltshev & Indzhov, 2018 — Albania, Macedonia
- Histopona laeta (Kulczyński, 1897) — Balkans
- Histopona leonardoi Bolzern, Pantini & Isaia, 2013 — Switzerland, Italy
- Histopona luxurians (Kulczyński, 1897) — Austria to Ukraine and southeastern Europe
- Histopona myops (Simon, 1885) — South-eastern Europe
- Histopona palaeolithica (Brignoli, 1971) — Italy, Montenegro
- Histopona sinuata (Kulczyński, 1897) — Romania
- Histopona strinatii (Brignoli, 1976) — Greece
- Histopona thaleri Gasparo, 2005 — Greece
- Histopona torpida (C. L. Koch, 1837) (type) — Europe, Caucasus
- Histopona tranteevi Deltshev, 1978 — Bulgaria
- Histopona vignai Brignoli, 1980 — Albania, Macedonia, Greece

=== Hoffmannilena ===
Hoffmannilena Maya-Morales & Jiménez, 2016

- Hoffmannilena apoala Maya-Morales & Jiménez, 2016 — Mexico
- Hoffmannilena cumbre Maya-Morales & Jiménez, 2016 — Mexico
- Hoffmannilena huajuapan Maya-Morales & Jiménez, 2016 — Mexico
- Hoffmannilena lobata (F. O. Pickard-Cambridge, 1902) — Mexico
- Hoffmannilena marginata (F. O. Pickard-Cambridge, 1902) — Mexico
- Hoffmannilena mitla Maya-Morales & Jiménez, 2016 — Mexico
- Hoffmannilena nova (O. Pickard-Cambridge, 1896) — Guatemala
- Hoffmannilena tizayuca Maya-Morales & Jiménez, 2016 (type) — Mexico
- Hoffmannilena variabilis (F. O. Pickard-Cambridge, 1902) — Mexico

=== Hololena ===
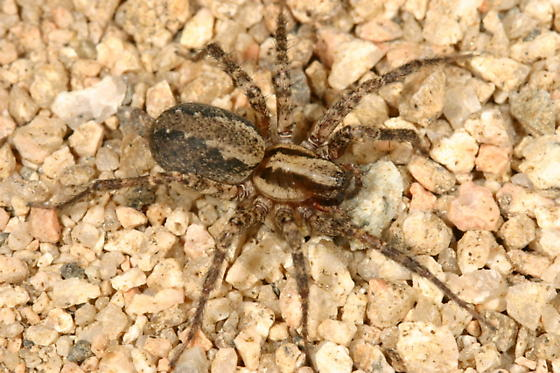
Hololena santana

Hololena Chamberlin & Gertsch, 1929

- Hololena adnexa (Chamberlin & Gertsch, 1929) — USA
- Hololena aduma Chamberlin & Ivie, 1942 — USA
- Hololena altura Chamberlin & Ivie, 1942 — USA
- Hololena atypica Chamberlin & Ivie, 1942 — USA
- Hololena barbarana Chamberlin & Ivie, 1942 — USA
- Hololena curta (McCook, 1894) — USA, Canada
- Hololena dana Chamberlin & Ivie, 1942 — USA
- Hololena frianta Chamberlin & Ivie, 1942 — USA
- Hololena furcata (Chamberlin & Gertsch, 1929) — USA
- Hololena hola (Chamberlin, 1928) — USA
- Hololena hopi Chamberlin & Ivie, 1942 — USA
- Hololena lassena Chamberlin & Ivie, 1942 — USA
- Hololena madera Chamberlin & Ivie, 1942 — USA
- Hololena mimoides (Chamberlin, 1919) (type) — USA
- Hololena monterea Chamberlin & Ivie, 1942 — USA
- Hololena nedra Chamberlin & Ivie, 1942 — USA
- Hololena nevada (Chamberlin & Gertsch, 1929) — USA
- Hololena oola Chamberlin & Ivie, 1942 — USA
- Hololena oquirrhensis (Chamberlin & Gertsch, 1930) — USA
- Hololena pacifica (Banks, 1896) — USA
- Hololena parana Chamberlin & Ivie, 1942 — USA
- Hololena pearcei Chamberlin & Ivie, 1942 — USA
- Hololena rabana Chamberlin & Ivie, 1942 — USA
- Hololena santana Chamberlin & Ivie, 1942 — USA
- Hololena septata Chamberlin & Ivie, 1942 — USA, Mexico
- Hololena sidella Chamberlin & Ivie, 1942 — USA
- Hololena sula Chamberlin & Ivie, 1942 — USA
- Hololena tentativa (Chamberlin & Gertsch, 1929) — USA
- Hololena tulareana Chamberlin & Ivie, 1942 — USA
- Hololena turba Chamberlin & Ivie, 1942 — USA

=== Huangyuania ===
Huangyuania Song & Li, 1990

- Huangyuania tibetana (Hu & Li, 1987) (type) — China

=== Huka ===
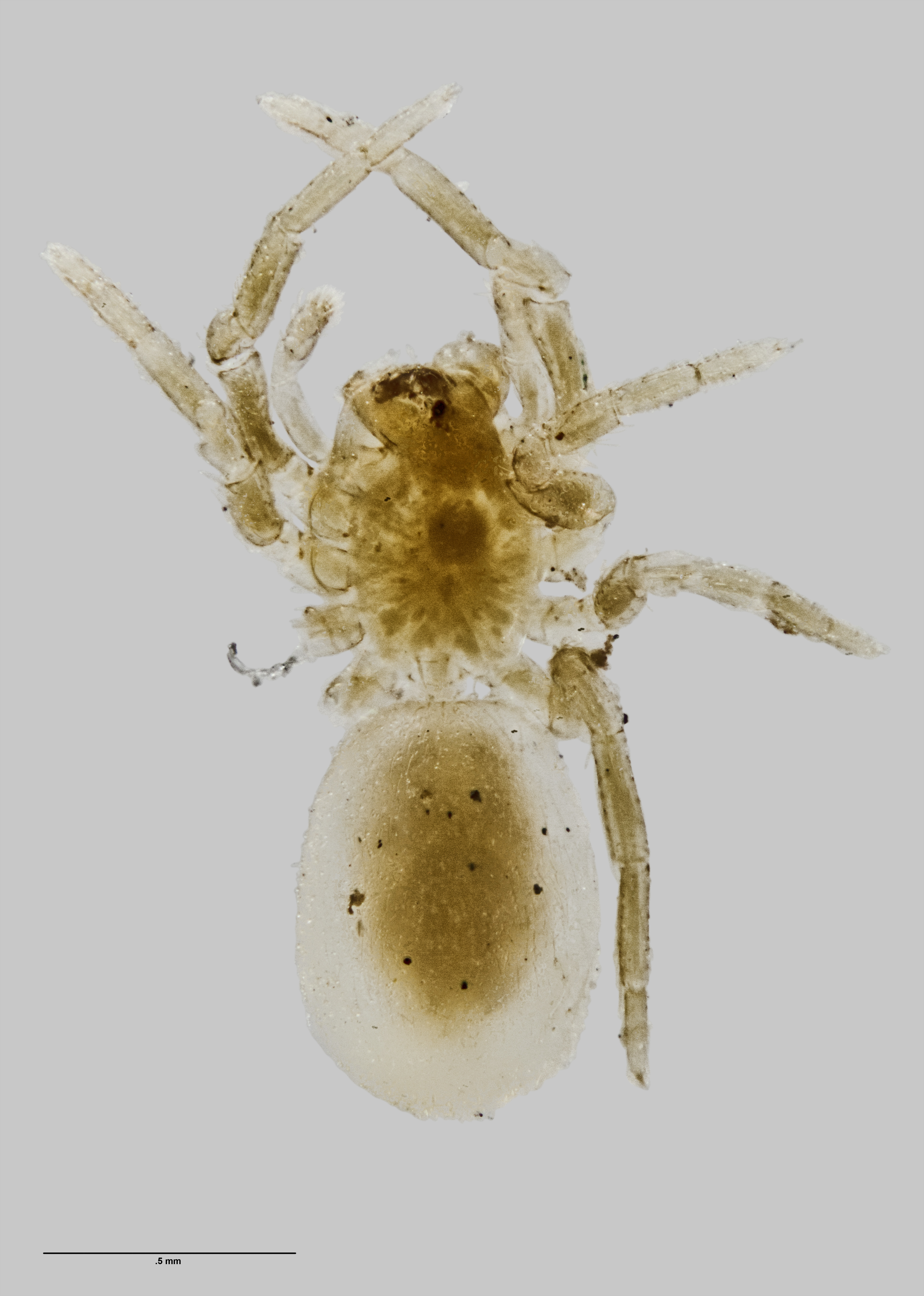
Huka alba

Huka Forster & Wilton, 1973

- Huka alba Forster & Wilton, 1973 — New Zealand
- Huka lobata Forster & Wilton, 1973 — New Zealand
- Huka minima Forster & Wilton, 1973 — New Zealand
- Huka minuta Forster & Wilton, 1973 — New Zealand
- Huka pallida Forster & Wilton, 1973 (type) — New Zealand

=== Hypocoelotes ===
Hypocoelotes Nishikawa, 2009

- Hypocoelotes tumidivulva (Nishikawa, 1980) (type) — Japan

== I-K ==
=== †Inceptor ===
†Inceptor Petrunkevitch, 1942

- †Inceptor aculeatus Petrunkevitch, 1942(type) — Palaeogene Baltic amber
- †Inceptor dubius Petrunkevitch, 1946 — Palaeogene Baltic amber

=== Inermocoelotes ===
Inermocoelotes Ovtchinnikov, 1999

- Inermocoelotes anoplus (Kulczyński, 1897) — Austria, Italy, Eastern Europe
- Inermocoelotes brevispinus (Deltshev & Dimitrov, 1996) — Bulgaria
- Inermocoelotes deltshevi (Dimitrov, 1996) — Macedonia, Bulgaria
- Inermocoelotes drenskii (Deltshev, 1990) — Bulgaria
- Inermocoelotes falciger (Kulczyński, 1897) — Eastern Europe
- Inermocoelotes gasperinii (Simon, 1891) — Croatia
- Inermocoelotes halanensis (Wang, Zhu & Li, 2010) — Croatia
- Inermocoelotes inermis (L. Koch, 1855) (type) — Europe
- Inermocoelotes jurinitschi (Drensky, 1915) — Bulgaria
- Inermocoelotes karlinskii (Kulczyński, 1906) — South-eastern Europe
- Inermocoelotes kulczynskii (Drensky, 1915) — Macedonia, Bulgaria
- Inermocoelotes melovskii Komnenov, 2017 — Macedonia
- Inermocoelotes microlepidus (de Blauwe, 1973) — Italy, Bulgaria
- Inermocoelotes paramicrolepidus (Wang, Zhu & Li, 2010) — Greece
- Inermocoelotes xinpingwangi (Deltshev, 2009) — Bulgaria

=== Iwogumoa ===
Iwogumoa Kishida, 1955

- Iwogumoa acco (Nishikawa, 1987) — Japan
- Iwogumoa dalianensis Zhang, Zhu & Wang, 2017 — China
- Iwogumoa dicranata (Wang, Yin, Peng & Xie, 1990) — China
- Iwogumoa ensifer (Wang & Ono, 1998) — Taiwan
- Iwogumoa filamentacea (Tang, Yin & Zhang, 2002) — China
- Iwogumoa illustrata (Wang, Yin, Peng & Xie, 1990) — China
- Iwogumoa insidiosa (L. Koch, 1878) (type) — Russia (Far East), Korea, Japan
- Iwogumoa interuna (Nishikawa, 1977) — Russia (Far East), Korea, Japan
- Iwogumoa longa (Wang, Tso & Wu, 2001) — Taiwan
- Iwogumoa montivaga (Wang & Ono, 1998) — Taiwan
- Iwogumoa nagasakiensis Okumura, 2007 — Japan
- Iwogumoa pengi (Ovtchinnikov, 1999) — China
- Iwogumoa plancyi (Simon, 1880) — China, Japan
- Iwogumoa songminjae (Paik & Yaginuma, 1969) — China, Korea
- Iwogumoa taoyuandong (Bao & Yin, 2004) — China
- Iwogumoa tengchihensis (Wang & Ono, 1998) — Taiwan
- Iwogumoa xieae Liu & Li, 2008 — China
- Iwogumoa xinhuiensis (Chen, 1984) — China, Taiwan
- Iwogumoa yaeyamensis (Shimojana, 1982) — Japan
- Iwogumoa yushanensis (Wang & Ono, 1998) — Taiwan

=== Kidugua ===
Kidugua Lehtinen, 1967

- Kidugua spiralis Lehtinen, 1967 (type) — Congo

== L ==
=== Lagunella ===
Lagunella Maya-Morales & Jiménez, 2017

- Lagunella guaycura Maya-Morales, Jiménez & Palacios-Cardiel, 2017 (type) — Mexico

=== Leptocoelotes ===
Leptocoelotes Wang, 2002

- Leptocoelotes edentulus (Wang & Ono, 1998) — Taiwan
- Leptocoelotes pseudoluniformis (Zhang, Peng & Kim, 1997) (type) — China

=== Lineacoelotes ===
Lineacoelotes Xu, Li & Wang, 2008

- Lineacoelotes bicultratus (Chen, Zhao & Wang, 1991) — China
- Lineacoelotes funiushanensis (Hu, Wang & Wang, 1991) — China
- Lineacoelotes longicephalus Xu, Li & Wang, 2008 (type) — China
- Lineacoelotes nitidus (Li & Zhang, 2002) — China
- Lineacoelotes strenuus Xu, Li & Wang, 2008 — China

=== Longicoelotes ===
Longicoelotes Wang, 2002

- Longicoelotes geei Zhang & Zhao, 2017 — China
- Longicoelotes karschi Wang, 2002 (type) — China
- Longicoelotes kulianganus (Chamberlin, 1924) — China
- Longicoelotes senkakuensis (Shimojana, 2000) — Japan (Ryukyu Is.)

=== Lycosoides ===
Lycosoides Lucas, 1846

- Lycosoides caparti (de Blauwe, 1980) — Morocco, Algeria
- Lycosoides coarctata (Dufour, 1831) — Mediterranean
- Lycosoides crassivulva (Denis, 1954) — Morocco
- Lycosoides flavomaculata Lucas, 1846 (type) — Mediterranean
- Lycosoides instabilis (Denis, 1954) — Morocco
- Lycosoides lehtineni Marusik & Guseinov, 2003 — Azerbaijan
- Lycosoides leprieuri (Simon, 1875) — Algeria, Tunisia
- Lycosoides parva (Denis, 1954) — Morocco
- Lycosoides subfasciata (Simon, 1870) — Morocco, Algeria
- Lycosoides variegata (Simon, 1870) — Spain, Morocco, Algeria

== M ==
=== Mahura ===
Mahura Forster & Wilton, 1973

- Mahura accola Forster & Wilton, 1973 — New Zealand
- Mahura bainhamensis Forster & Wilton, 1973 — New Zealand
- Mahura boara Forster & Wilton, 1973 — New Zealand
- Mahura crypta Forster & Wilton, 1973 — New Zealand
- Mahura detrita Forster & Wilton, 1973 — New Zealand
- Mahura hinua Forster & Wilton, 1973 — New Zealand
- Mahura musca Forster & Wilton, 1973 — New Zealand
- Mahura rubella Forster & Wilton, 1973 — New Zealand
- Mahura rufula Forster & Wilton, 1973 — New Zealand
- Mahura scuta Forster & Wilton, 1973 — New Zealand
- Mahura sorenseni Forster & Wilton, 1973 — New Zealand
- Mahura southgatei Forster & Wilton, 1973 — New Zealand
- Mahura spinosa Forster & Wilton, 1973 — New Zealand
- Mahura spinosoides Forster & Wilton, 1973 — New Zealand
- Mahura takahea Forster & Wilton, 1973 — New Zealand
- Mahura tarsa Forster & Wilton, 1973 — New Zealand
- Mahura turris Forster & Wilton, 1973 (type) — New Zealand
- Mahura vella Forster & Wilton, 1973 — New Zealand

=== Maimuna ===
Maimuna Lehtinen, 1967

- Maimuna bovierlapierrei (Kulczyński, 1911) — Lebanon, Israel
- Maimuna cariae Brignoli, 1978 — Turkey
- Maimuna carmelica Levy, 1996 — Israel
- Maimuna cretica (Kulczyński, 1903) — Greece, Crete
- Maimuna inornata (O. Pickard-Cambridge, 1872) — Greece, Syria, Israel
- Maimuna meronis Levy, 1996 — Israel
- Maimuna vestita (C. L. Koch, 1841) (type) — Eastern Mediterranean

=== Malthonica ===
Malthonica Simon, 1898

- Malthonica africana Simon & Fage, 1922 — East Africa
- Malthonica daedali Brignoli, 1980 — Greece (Crete)
- Malthonica lusitanica Simon, 1898 (type) — Portugal to France
- Malthonica minoa (Brignoli, 1976) — Greece (Crete)
- Malthonica oceanica Barrientos & Cardoso, 2007 — Portugal
- Malthonica paraschiae Brignoli, 1984 — Greece
- Malthonica spinipalpis Deltshev, 1990 — Greece

=== Melpomene ===
Melpomene O. Pickard-Cambridge, 1898

- Melpomene bicavata (F. O. Pickard-Cambridge, 1902) — Mexico
- Melpomene chamela Maya-Morales & Jiménez, 2017 — Mexico
- Melpomene chiricana Chamberlin & Ivie, 1942 — Panama
- Melpomene coahuilana (Gertsch & Davis, 1940) — Mexico
- Melpomene elegans O. Pickard-Cambridge, 1898 (type) — Mexico
- Melpomene panamana (Petrunkevitch, 1925) — Panama
- Melpomene penetralis (F. O. Pickard-Cambridge, 1902) — Costa Rica
- Melpomene plesia Chamberlin & Ivie, 1942 — Panama
- Melpomene quadrata (Kraus, 1955) — El Salvador
- Melpomene rita (Chamberlin & Ivie, 1941) — USA
- Melpomene singula (Gertsch & Ivie, 1936) — Mexico
- Melpomene solisi Maya-Morales & Jiménez, 2017 — Mexico
- Melpomene transversa (F. O. Pickard-Cambridge, 1902) — Mexico

=== Mistaria ===
Mistaria Lehtinen, 1967

- Mistaria fagei (Caporiacco, 1949) — Kenya
- Mistaria leucopyga (Pavesi, 1883) (type) — Central, East Africa, Yemen
- Mistaria leucopyga niangarensis (Lessert, 1927) — East Africa
- Mistaria nairobii (Caporiacco, 1949) — Central, East Africa
- Mistaria nyeupenyeusi G. M. Kioko & S. Q. Li, 2018 — Kenya
- Mistaria zorica (Strand, 1913) — Central, East Africa

== N ==
=== Neorepukia ===
Neorepukia Forster & Wilton, 1973

- Neorepukia hama Forster & Wilton, 1973 — New Zealand
- Neorepukia pilama Forster & Wilton, 1973 (type) — New Zealand

=== Neotegenaria ===
Neotegenaria Roth, 1967

- Neotegenaria agelenoides Roth, 1967 (type) — Guyana

=== Neowadotes ===
Neowadotes Alayón, 1995

- Neowadotes casabito Alayón, 1995 (type) — Hispaniola

=== Notiocoelotes ===
Notiocoelotes Wang, Xu & Li, 2008

- Notiocoelotes laosensis Wang, Xu & Li, 2008 — Laos
- Notiocoelotes lingulatus Wang, Xu & Li, 2008 — China
- Notiocoelotes maoganensis Zhao & Li, 2016 — China
- Notiocoelotes membranaceus Liu & Li, 2010 — China
- Notiocoelotes orbiculatus Liu & Li, 2010 — China
- Notiocoelotes palinitropus (Zhu & Wang, 1994) (type) — China
- Notiocoelotes parvitriangulus Liu, Li & Pham, 2010 — Vietnam
- Notiocoelotes pseudolingulatus Liu & Li, 2010 — China
- Notiocoelotes pseudovietnamensis Liu, Li & Pham, 2010 — Vietnam
- Notiocoelotes qiongzhongensis Zhao & Li, 2016 — China
- Notiocoelotes sparus (Dankittipakul, Chami-Kranon & Wang, 2005) — Thailand
- Notiocoelotes spirellus Liu & Li, 2010 — China
- Notiocoelotes vietnamensis Wang, Xu & Li, 2008 — Vietnam

=== Novalena ===
Novalena Chamberlin & Ivie, 1942

- Novalena ajusco Maya-Morales & Jiménez, 2017 — Mexico
- Novalena alamo Maya-Morales & Jiménez, 2017 — Mexico
- Novalena alvarezi Maya-Morales & Jiménez, 2017 — Mexico
- Novalena annamae (Gertsch & Davis, 1940) — Mexico
- Novalena approximata (Gertsch & Ivie, 1936) — Mexico, Costa Rica
- Novalena attenuata (F. O. Pickard-Cambridge, 1902) — Mexico, Guatemala
- Novalena atzimbo Maya-Morales & Jiménez, 2017 — Mexico
- Novalena bipartita (Kraus, 1955) — El Salvador
- Novalena bipunctata Roth, 1967 — Mexico, Trinidad
- Novalena bosencheve Maya-Morales & Jiménez, 2017 — Mexico
- Novalena calavera Chamberlin & Ivie, 1942 — USA
- Novalena chamberlini Maya-Morales & Jiménez, 2017 — Mexico
- Novalena cieneguilla Maya-Morales & Jiménez, 2017 — Mexico
- Novalena cintalapa Maya-Morales & Jiménez, 2017 — Mexico
- Novalena clara Maya-Morales & Jiménez, 2017 — Mexico
- Novalena comaltepec Maya-Morales & Jiménez, 2017 — Mexico
- Novalena costata (F. O. Pickard-Cambridge, 1902) — Costa Rica
- Novalena creel Maya-Morales & Jiménez, 2017 — Mexico
- Novalena dentata Maya-Morales & Jiménez, 2017 — Mexico
- Novalena divisadero Maya-Morales & Jiménez, 2017 — Mexico
- Novalena durango Maya-Morales & Jiménez, 2017 — Mexico
- Novalena franckei Maya-Morales & Jiménez, 2017 — Mexico
- Novalena garnica Maya-Morales & Jiménez, 2017 — Mexico
- Novalena gibarrai Maya-Morales & Jiménez, 2017 — Mexico
- Novalena intermedia (Chamberlin & Gertsch, 1930) (type) — Canada, USA
- Novalena irazu Maya-Morales & Jiménez, 2017 — Costa Rica
- Novalena iviei Maya-Morales & Jiménez, 2017 — Mexico
- Novalena ixtlan Maya-Morales & Jiménez, 2017 — Mexico
- Novalena jiquilpan Maya-Morales & Jiménez, 2017 — Mexico
- Novalena laticava (Kraus, 1955) — El Salvador
- Novalena leonensis Maya-Morales & Jiménez, 2017 — Mexico
- Novalena lutzi (Gertsch, 1933) — USA
- Novalena mexiquensis Maya-Morales & Jiménez, 2017 — Mexico
- Novalena oaxaca Maya-Morales & Jiménez, 2017 — Mexico
- Novalena orizaba (Banks, 1898) — Mexico
- Novalena paricutin Maya-Morales & Jiménez, 2017 — Mexico
- Novalena perote Maya-Morales & Jiménez, 2017 — Mexico
- Novalena plata Maya-Morales & Jiménez, 2017 — USA
- Novalena poncei Maya-Morales & Jiménez, 2017 — Mexico
- Novalena popoca Maya-Morales & Jiménez, 2017 — Mexico
- Novalena prieta Maya-Morales & Jiménez, 2017 — Mexico
- Novalena puebla Maya-Morales & Jiménez, 2017 — Mexico
- Novalena punta Maya-Morales & Jiménez, 2017 — Mexico
- Novalena rothi Maya-Morales & Jiménez, 2017 — USA
- Novalena saltoensis Maya-Morales & Jiménez, 2017 — Mexico
- Novalena shlomitae (García-Villafuerte, 2009) — Mexico
- Novalena simplex (F. O. Pickard-Cambridge, 1902) — Mexico, Guatemala
- Novalena sinaloa Maya-Morales & Jiménez, 2017 — Mexico
- Novalena tacana Maya-Morales & Jiménez, 2017 — Mexico, Guatemala
- Novalena triunfo Maya-Morales & Jiménez, 2017 — Mexico
- Novalena valdezi Maya-Morales & Jiménez, 2017 — Mexico
- Novalena victoria Maya-Morales & Jiménez, 2017 — Mexico
- Novalena volcanes Maya-Morales & Jiménez, 2017 — Mexico

=== Nuconarius ===
Nuconarius Zhao & S. Q. Li, 2018

- Nuconarius brevipatellatus Zhao & S. Q. Li, 2018 (type) — China
- Nuconarius capitulatus (Wang, 2003) — China
- Nuconarius pseudocapitulatus (Wang, 2003) — China

== O ==
=== Olorunia ===
Olorunia Lehtinen, 1967

- Olorunia punctata Lehtinen, 1967 (type) — Congo

=== Oramia ===
Oramia Forster, 1964

- Oramia chathamensis (Simon, 1899) — New Zealand (Chatham Is.)
- Oramia frequens (Rainbow, 1920) — Australia (Lord Howe Is.)
- Oramia littoralis Forster & Wilton, 1973 — New Zealand
- Oramia mackerrowi (Marples, 1959) — New Zealand
- Oramia marplesi Forster, 1964 — New Zealand (Auckland Is.)
- Oramia occidentalis (Marples, 1959) — New Zealand
- Oramia rubrioides (Hogg, 1909) (type) — New Zealand
- Oramia solanderensis Forster & Wilton, 1973 — New Zealand

=== Oramiella ===
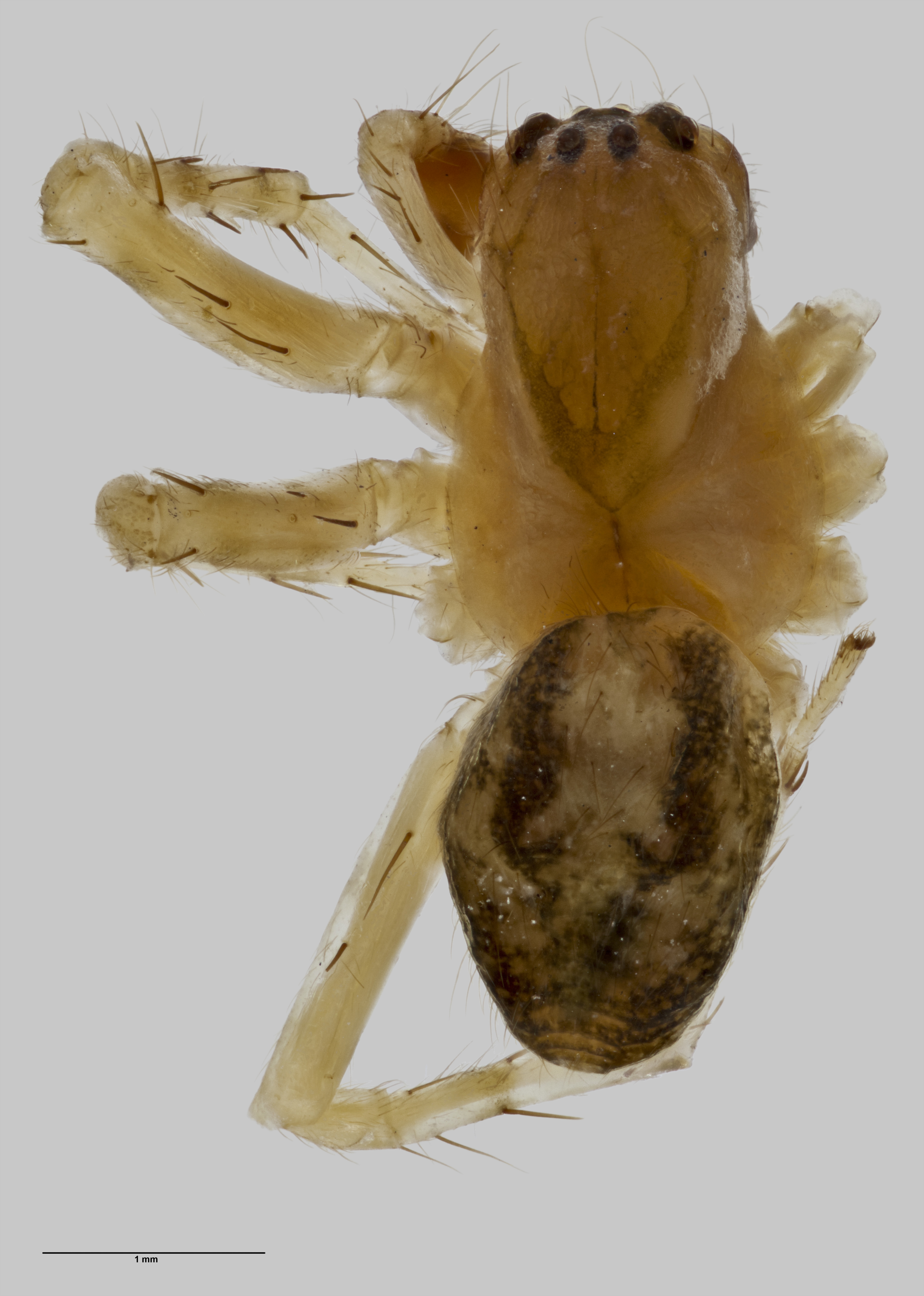
Oramiella wisei

Oramiella Forster & Wilton, 1973

- Oramiella wisei Forster & Wilton, 1973 (type) — New Zealand

=== Orumcekia ===
Orumcekia Koçak & Kemal, 2008

- Orumcekia gemata (Wang, 1994) (type) — China, Vietnam
- Orumcekia jianhuii (Tang & Yin, 2002) — China
- Orumcekia lanna (Dankittipakul, Sonthichai & Wang, 2006) — Thailand
- Orumcekia libo (Wang, 2003) — China, Vietnam
- Orumcekia mangshan (Zhang & Yin, 2001) — China
- Orumcekia pseudogemata (Xu & Li, 2007) — China
- Orumcekia sigillata (Wang, 1994) — China
- Orumcekia subsigillata (Wang, 2003) — China

== P ==
=== Papiliocoelotes ===
Papiliocoelotes Zhao & Li, 2016

- Papiliocoelotes guanyinensis Zhao & Li, 2016 — China
- Papiliocoelotes guitangensis Zhao & Li, 2016 — China
- Papiliocoelotes jiepingensis Zhao & Li, 2016 — China
- Papiliocoelotes meiyuensis Zhao & Li, 2016 — China
- Papiliocoelotes yezhouensis Zhao & Li, 2016 (type) — China

=== Paramyro ===
Paramyro Forster & Wilton, 1973

- Paramyro apicus Forster & Wilton, 1973 (type) — New Zealand
- Paramyro parapicus Forster & Wilton, 1973 — New Zealand

=== Pireneitega ===
Pireneitega Kishida, 1955

- Pireneitega armeniaca (Brignoli, 1978) — Turkey
- Pireneitega bidens (Caporiacco, 1935) — Karakorum
- Pireneitega burqinensis Zhao & Li, 2016 — China
- Pireneitega cottarellii (Brignoli, 1978) — Turkey
- Pireneitega fedotovi (Charitonov, 1946) — Uzbekistan
- Pireneitega fuyunensis Zhao & Li, 2016 — China
- Pireneitega garibaldii (Kritscher, 1969) — Italy
- Pireneitega gongliuensis Zhao & Li, 2016 — China
- Pireneitega huashanensis Zhao & Li, 2017 — China
- Pireneitega huochengensis Zhao & Li, 2016 — China
- Pireneitega involuta (Wang, Yin, Peng & Xie, 1990) — China
- Pireneitega kovblyuki Zhang & Marusik, 2016 — Tajikistan
- Pireneitega lini Zhao & Li, 2016 — China
- Pireneitega liui Zhao & Li, 2016 — China
- Pireneitega luctuosa (L. Koch, 1878) — Central Asia, China, Russia (Far East), Korea, Japan
- Pireneitega luniformis (Zhu & Wang, 1994) — China
- Pireneitega lushuiensis Zhao & Li, 2017 — China
- Pireneitega major (Kroneberg, 1875) — Uzbekistan, Tajikistan, China
- Pireneitega muratovi Zhang & Marusik, 2016 — Tajikistan
- Pireneitega ovtchinnikovi Kovblyuk, Kastrygina, Marusik & Ponomarev, 2013 — Caucasus (Russia, Georgia)
- Pireneitega pyrenaea (Simon, 1870) — Spain, France
- Pireneitega ramitensis Zhang & Marusik, 2016 — Tajikistan
- Pireneitega segestriformis (Dufour, 1820) (type) — Spain, Andorra, France
- Pireneitega spasskyi (Charitonov, 1946) — Caucasus (Russia, Georgia, Azerbaijan)
- Pireneitega spinivulva (Simon, 1880) — Russia (Far East), China, Korea
- Pireneitega taishanensis (Wang, Yin, Peng & Xie, 1990) — China
- Pireneitega taiwanensis Wang & Ono, 1998 — Taiwan
- Pireneitega tianchiensis (Wang, Yin, Peng & Xie, 1990) — China
- Pireneitega tyurai Zhang & Marusik, 2016 — Tajikistan
- Pireneitega wensuensis Zhao & Li, 2016 — China
- Pireneitega wui Zhao & Li, 2016 — China
- Pireneitega xinping Zhang, Zhu & Song, 2002 — China
- Pireneitega xiyankouensis Zhao & Li, 2017 — China
- Pireneitega yaoi Zhao & Li, 2016 — China
- Pireneitega zonsteini Zhang & Marusik, 2016 — Tajikistan

=== Platocoelotes ===
Platocoelotes Wang, 2002

- Platocoelotes ampulliformis Liu & Li, 2008 — China
- Platocoelotes bifidus Yin, Xu & Yan, 2010 — China
- Platocoelotes brevis Liu & Li, 2008 — China
- Platocoelotes daweishanensis Xu & Li, 2008 — China
- Platocoelotes fanjingshan Jiang, Chen & Zhang, 2018 — China
- Platocoelotes furcatus Liu & Li, 2008 — China
- Platocoelotes globosus Xu & Li, 2008 — China
- Platocoelotes icohamatoides (Peng & Wang, 1997) — China
- Platocoelotes imperfectus Wang & Jäger, 2007 — China
- Platocoelotes impletus (Peng & Wang, 1997) (type) — China
- Platocoelotes kailiensis Wang, 2003 — China
- Platocoelotes latus Xu & Li, 2008 — China
- Platocoelotes lichuanensis (Chen & Zhao, 1998) — China
- Platocoelotes luoi Chen & Li, 2015 — China
- Platocoelotes paralatus Xu & Li, 2008 — China
- Platocoelotes polyptychus Xu & Li, 2007 — China
- Platocoelotes qinglinensis Chen & Li, 2015 — China
- Platocoelotes shuiensis Chen & Li, 2015 — China
- Platocoelotes strombuliformis Liu & Li, 2008 — China
- Platocoelotes tianyangensis Chen & Li, 2015 — China
- Platocoelotes uenoi (Yamaguchi & Yaginuma, 1971) — Japan
- Platocoelotes xianwuensis Chen & Li, 2015 — China
- Platocoelotes zhuchuandiani Liu & Li, 2012 — China

=== Porotaka ===
Porotaka Forster & Wilton, 1973

- Porotaka detrita Forster & Wilton, 1973 (type) — New Zealand
- Porotaka florae Forster & Wilton, 1973 — New Zealand

=== Pseudotegenaria ===
Pseudotegenaria Caporiacco, 1934

- Pseudotegenaria parva Caporiacco, 1934 (type) — Libya

== R ==
=== Robusticoelotes ===
Robusticoelotes Wang, 2002

- Robusticoelotes pichoni (Schenkel, 1963) (type) — China
- Robusticoelotes sanmenensis (Tang, Yin & Zhang, 2002) — China
- Robusticoelotes subpichoni Zhang, Zhu & Wang, 2017 — China

=== Rothilena ===
Rothilena Maya-Morales & Jiménez, 2013

- Rothilena cochimi Maya-Morales & Jiménez, 2013 — Mexico
- Rothilena golondrina Maya-Morales & Jiménez, 2013 — Mexico
- Rothilena griswoldi Maya-Morales & Jiménez, 2013 (type) — Mexico
- Rothilena naranjensis Maya-Morales & Jiménez, 2013 — Mexico
- Rothilena pilar Maya-Morales & Jiménez, 2013 — Mexico
- Rothilena sudcaliforniensis Maya-Morales & Jiménez, 2013 — Mexico

=== Rualena ===
Rualena Chamberlin & Ivie, 1942

- Rualena alleni Chamberlin & Ivie, 1942 — USA
- Rualena avila Chamberlin & Ivie, 1942 — USA
- Rualena balboae (Schenkel, 1950) — USA
- Rualena cavata (F. O. Pickard-Cambridge, 1902) — Mexico
- Rualena cedros Maya-Morales & Jiménez, 2016 — Mexico
- Rualena cockerelli Chamberlin & Ivie, 1942 — USA
- Rualena cruzana Chamberlin & Ivie, 1942 — USA
- Rualena magnacava Chamberlin & Ivie, 1942 — USA, Mexico
- Rualena parritas Maya-Morales & Jiménez, 2016 — Mexico
- Rualena pasquinii Brignoli, 1974 — Mexico
- Rualena rua (Chamberlin, 1919) — USA
- Rualena surana Chamberlin & Ivie, 1942 (type) — USA
- Rualena thomas Maya-Morales & Jiménez, 2016 — USA
- Rualena ubicki Maya-Morales & Jiménez, 2016 — Mexico

== S ==
=== Sinocoelotes ===
Sinocoelotes Zhao & Li, 2016

- Sinocoelotes acicularis (Wang, Griswold & Ubick, 2009) — China
- Sinocoelotes arcuatus Zhang & Chen, 2018 — China
- Sinocoelotes cangshanensis Zhao & Li, 2016 — China
- Sinocoelotes forficatus (Liu & Li, 2010) — China
- Sinocoelotes guangxian (Zhang, Yang, Zhu & Song, 2003) — China
- Sinocoelotes hehuaensis Zhao & Li, 2016 (type) — China
- Sinocoelotes kangdingensis Zhao & Li, 2016 — China
- Sinocoelotes ludingensis Zhao & Li, 2016 — China
- Sinocoelotes luoshuiensis Zhao & Li, 2016 — China
- Sinocoelotes mahuanggouensis Zhao & Li, 2016 — China
- Sinocoelotes mangbangensis Zhao & Li, 2016 — China
- Sinocoelotes muliensis Zhao & Li, 2016 — China
- Sinocoelotes porus (Zhang, Zhu & Wang, 2017) — China
- Sinocoelotes pseudoguangxian (Wang, Griswold & Ubick, 2009) — China
- Sinocoelotes pseudoterrestris (Schenkel, 1963) — China
- Sinocoelotes pseudoyunnanensis (Wang, Griswold & Ubick, 2009) — China
- Sinocoelotes songi (Zhang, Zhu & Wang, 2017) — China
- Sinocoelotes subguangxian Wang & Zhang, 2018 — China
- Sinocoelotes thailandensis (Dankittipakul & Wang, 2003) — Thailand
- Sinocoelotes yanhengmei (Wang, Griswold & Ubick, 2009) — China
- Sinocoelotes yanyuanensis Zhao & Li, 2016 — China
- Sinocoelotes yunnanensis (Schenkel, 1963) — China

=== Sinodraconarius ===
Sinodraconarius Zhao & S. Q. Li, 2018

- Sinodraconarius cawarongensis Zhao & S. Q. Li, 2018 — China
- Sinodraconarius muruoensis Zhao & S. Q. Li, 2018 — China
- Sinodraconarius patellabifidus (Wang, 2003) — China
- Sinodraconarius sangjiuensis Zhao & S. Q. Li, 2018 (type) — China
- Sinodraconarius yui Zhao & S. Q. Li, 2018 — China

=== Spiricoelotes ===
Spiricoelotes Wang, 2002

- Spiricoelotes anshiensis Chen & Li, 2016 — China
- Spiricoelotes chufengensis Chen & Li, 2016 — China
- Spiricoelotes nansheensis Chen & Li, 2016 — China
- Spiricoelotes pseudozonatus Wang, 2003 — China
- Spiricoelotes taipingensis Chen & Li, 2016 — China
- Spiricoelotes urumensis (Shimojana, 1989) — Japan (Ryukyu Is.)
- Spiricoelotes xianheensis Chen & Li, 2016 — China
- Spiricoelotes xiongxinensis Chen & Li, 2016 — China
- Spiricoelotes zonatus (Peng & Wang, 1997) — China, Japan

== T ==
=== Tamgrinia ===
Tamgrinia Lehtinen, 1967

- Tamgrinia alveolifera (Schenkel, 1936) (type) — India, China
- Tamgrinia coelotiformis (Schenkel, 1963) — China
- Tamgrinia laticeps (Schenkel, 1936) — China
- Tamgrinia palpator (Hu & Li, 1987) — China
- Tamgrinia rectangularis Xu & Li, 2006 — China
- Tamgrinia semiserrata Xu & Li, 2006 — China
- Tamgrinia tibetana (Hu & Li, 1987) — China
- Tamgrinia tulugouensis Wang, 2000 — China

=== Tararua ===
Tararua Forster & Wilton, 1973

- Tararua celeripes (Urquhart, 1891) (type) — New Zealand
- Tararua clara Forster & Wilton, 1973 — New Zealand
- Tararua diversa Forster & Wilton, 1973 — New Zealand
- Tararua foordi Forster & Wilton, 1973 — New Zealand
- Tararua puna Forster & Wilton, 1973 — New Zealand
- Tararua ratuma Forster & Wilton, 1973 — New Zealand
- Tararua versuta Forster & Wilton, 1973 — New Zealand

=== Tegecoelotes ===
Tegecoelotes Ovtchinnikov, 1999

- Tegecoelotes chikunii Okumura, Ono & Nishikawa, 2011 — Japan
- Tegecoelotes corasides (Bösenberg & Strand, 1906) — Japan
- Tegecoelotes dorsatus (Uyemura, 1936) — Japan
- Tegecoelotes dysodentatus Zhang & Zhu, 2005 — China
- Tegecoelotes echigonis Nishikawa, 2009 — Japan
- Tegecoelotes eurydentatus Zhang, Zhu & Wang, 2017 — China
- Tegecoelotes hibaensis Okumura, Ono & Nishikawa, 2011 — Japan
- Tegecoelotes ignotus (Bösenberg & Strand, 1906) — Japan
- Tegecoelotes michikoae (Nishikawa, 1977) — Japan
- Tegecoelotes mizuyamae Ono, 2008 — Japan
- Tegecoelotes otomo Nishikawa, 2009 — Japan
- Tegecoelotes religiosus Nishikawa, 2009 — Japan
- Tegecoelotes secundus (Paik, 1971) (type) — Russia (Far East), China, Korea, Japan
- Tegecoelotes tateyamaensis Nishikawa, 2009 — Japan
- Tegecoelotes yogoensis Nishikawa, 2009 — Japan

=== Tegenaria ===
Tegenaria

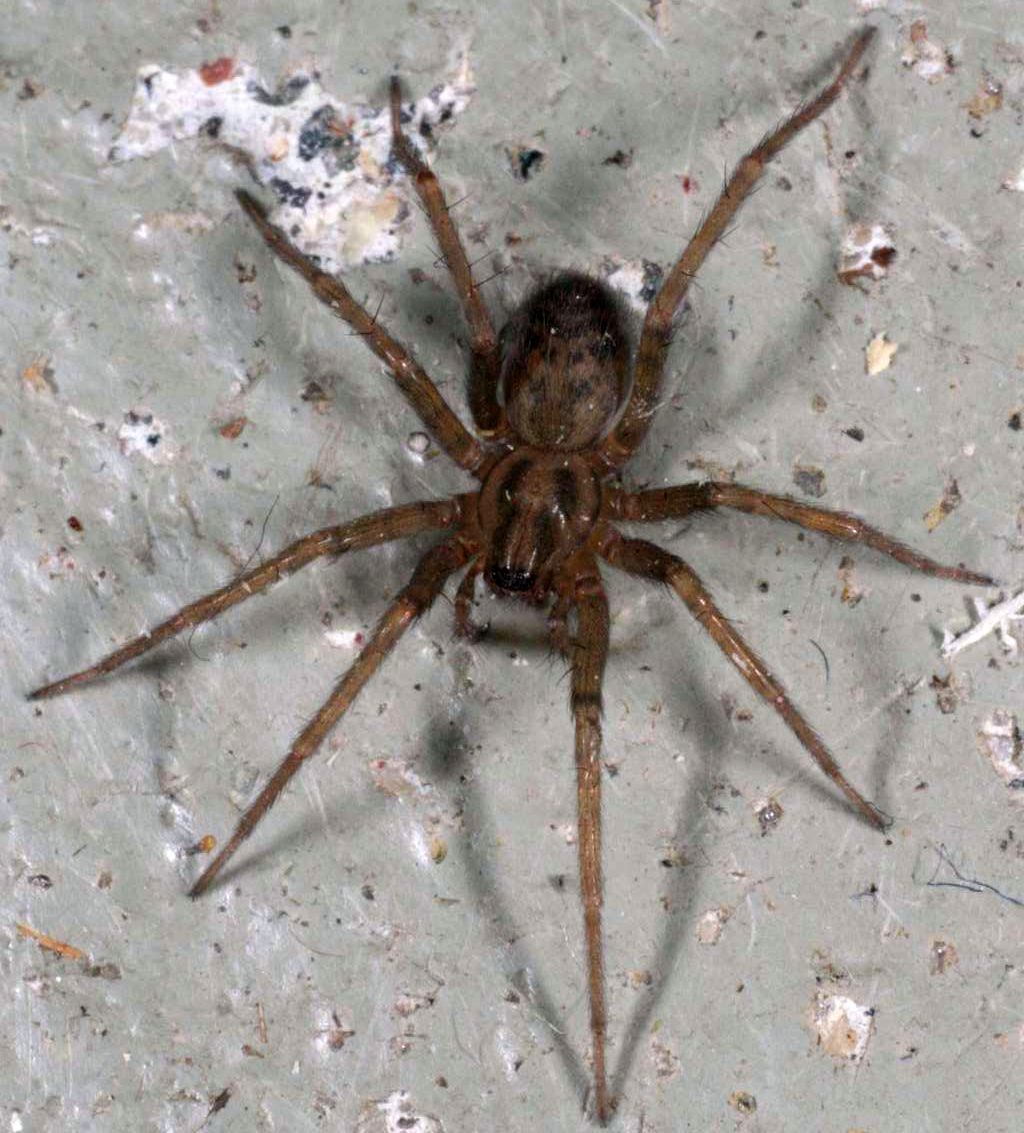
Tegenaria domestica

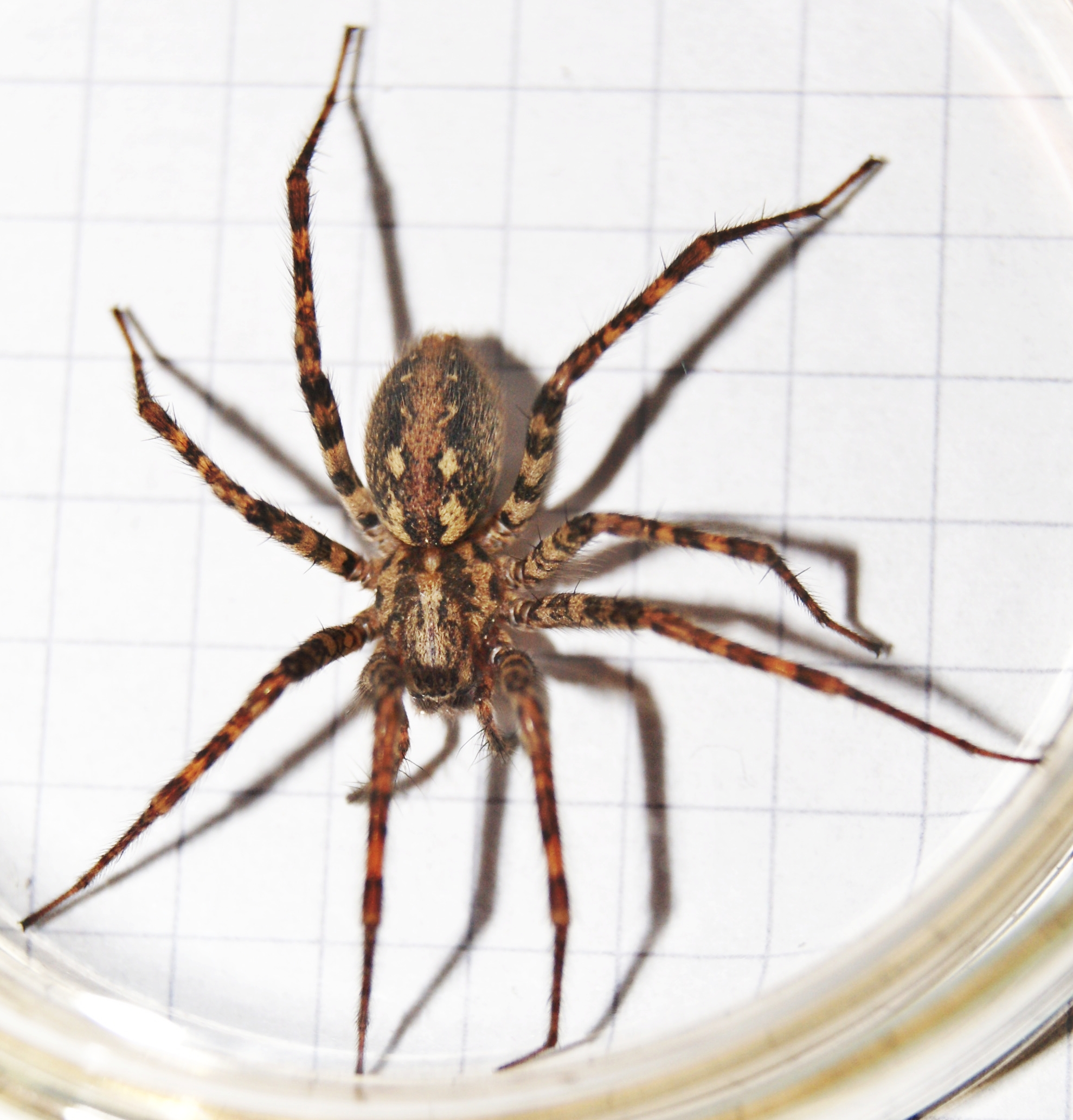
Tegenaria ferruginea

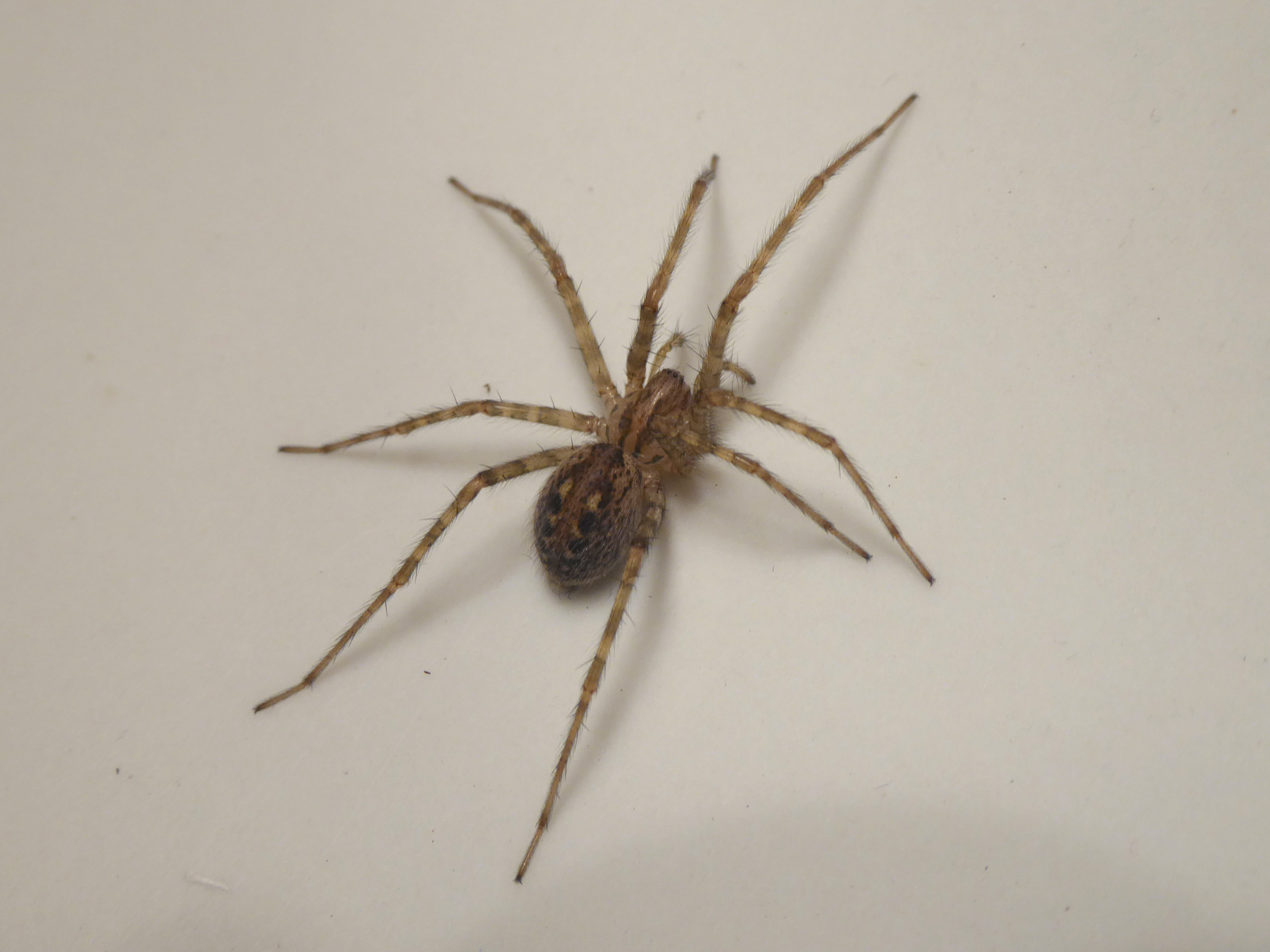
Tegenaria parietina, young female

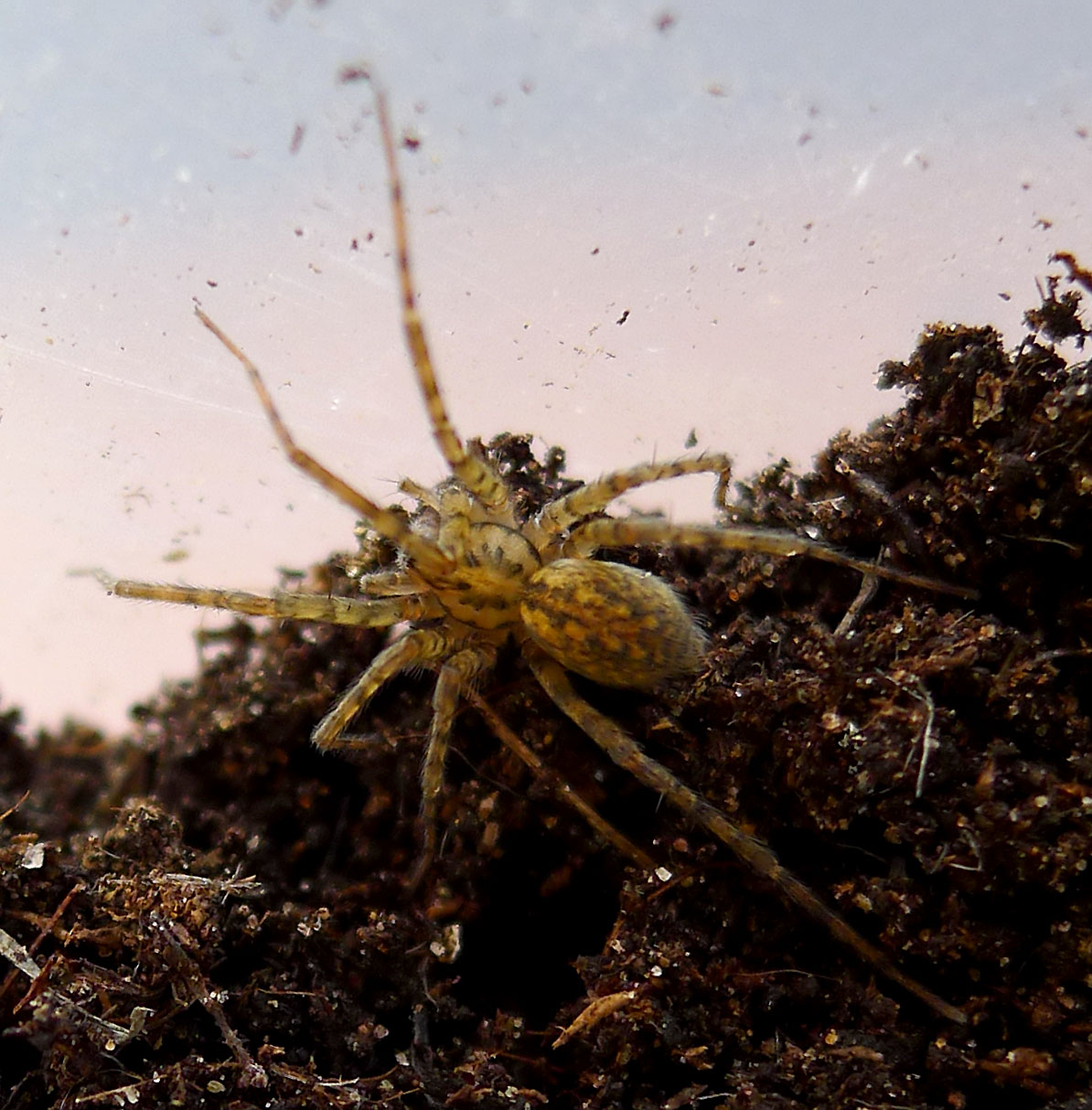
Tegenaria silvestris

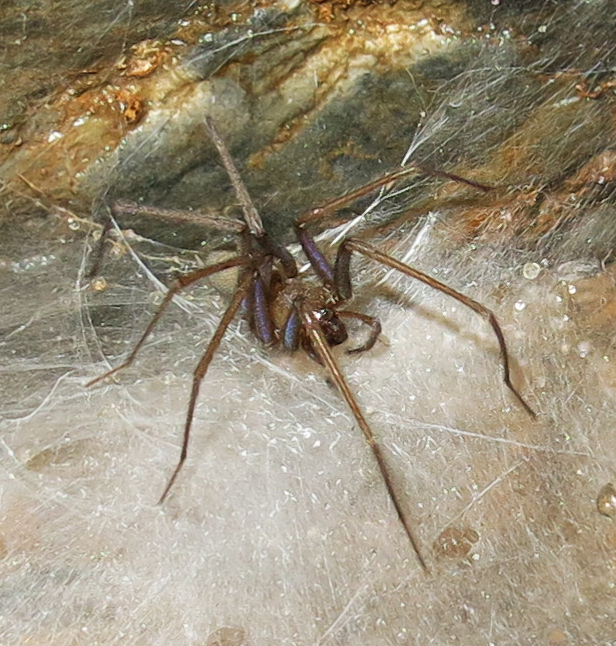
Tegenaria zamanii

Tegenaria Latreille, 1804

- Tegenaria abchasica Charitonov, 1941 — Caucasus (Russia, Georgia)
- Tegenaria achaea Brignoli, 1977 — Greece, Turkey
- Tegenaria adomestica Guseinov, Marusik & Koponen, 2005 — Azerbaijan
- Tegenaria africana Lucas, 1846 — Algeria
- Tegenaria agnolettii Brignoli, 1978 — Turkey
- Tegenaria alamto Zamani, Marusik & Malek-Hosseini, 2018 — Iran
- Tegenaria angustipalpis Levy, 1996 — Greece, Israel
- Tegenaria anhela Brignoli, 1972 — Turkey
- Tegenaria animata Kratochvíl & Miller, 1940 — Serbia, Montenegro, Macedonia
- Tegenaria annae Bolzern, Burckhardt & Hänggi, 2013 — Greece
- Tegenaria annulata Kulczyński, 1913 — Bosnia-Hercegovina, Croatia, Serbia, Montenegro
- Tegenaria argaeica Nosek, 1905 — Bulgaria, Turkey
- Tegenaria ariadnae Brignoli, 1984 — Greece (Crete)
- Tegenaria armigera Simon, 1873 — France (Corsica), Italy (Sardinia)
- Tegenaria averni Brignoli, 1978 — Turkey
- Tegenaria bayeri Kratochvíl, 1934 — Bosnia-Hercegovina, Serbia, Montenegro
- Tegenaria bayrami Kaya, Kunt, Marusik & Uğurtaş, 2010 — Turkey
- Tegenaria bosnica Kratochvíl & Miller, 1940 — Croatia, Bosnia-Hercegovina, Serbia, Montenegro
- Tegenaria bozhkovi (Deltshev, 2008) — Bulgaria, Greece
- Tegenaria campestris (C. L. Koch, 1834) — Europe to Azerbaijan
- Tegenaria capolongoi Brignoli, 1977 — Italy
- Tegenaria carensis Barrientos, 1981 — Spain
- Tegenaria chebana Thorell, 1897 — Myanmar
- Tegenaria chiricahuae Roth, 1968 — USA
- Tegenaria chumachenkoi Kovblyuk & Ponomarev, 2008 — Russia (Europe, Caucasus), Georgia
- Tegenaria circeoensis Bolzern, Burckhardt & Hänggi, 2013 — Italy
- Tegenaria comnena Brignoli, 1978 — Turkey
- Tegenaria comstocki Gajbe, 2004 — India
- Tegenaria concolor Simon, 1873 — Syria
- Tegenaria cottarellii Brignoli, 1978 — Turkey
- Tegenaria croatica Bolzern, Burckhardt & Hänggi, 2013 — Croatia
- Tegenaria daiamsanesis Kim, 1998 — Korea
- Tegenaria dalmatica Kulczyński, 1906 — Mediterranean to Ukraine
- Tegenaria decolorata Kratochvíl & Miller, 1940 — Croatia
- Tegenaria dentifera Kulczyński, 1908 — Cyprus
- Tegenaria domestica (Clerck, 1757) (type) — Europe to China, Japan. Introduced to Australia, New Zealand, the Americas
- Tegenaria eleonorae Brignoli, 1974 — Italy
- Tegenaria elysii Brignoli, 1978 — Turkey
- Tegenaria epacris Levy, 1996 — Israel
- Tegenaria faniapollinis Brignoli, 1978 — Greece, Turkey
- Tegenaria femoralis Simon, 1873 — France, Italy
- Tegenaria ferruginea (Panzer, 1804) — Europe, Azores. Introduced to Venezuela
- Tegenaria forestieroi Brignoli, 1978 — Turkey
- †Tegenaria fragmentum Wunderlich, 2004w — Palaeogene Baltic amber
- Tegenaria halidi Guseinov, Marusik & Koponen, 2005 — Azerbaijan
- Tegenaria hamid Brignoli, 1978 — Turkey
- Tegenaria hasperi Chyzer, 1897 — France to Turkey, Russia (Europe)
- Tegenaria hauseri Brignoli, 1979 — Greece
- Tegenaria hemanginiae Reddy & Patel, 1992 — India
- Tegenaria henroti Dresco, 1956 — Sardinia
- Tegenaria ismaillensis Guseinov, Marusik & Koponen, 2005 — Azerbaijan
- Tegenaria karaman Brignoli, 1978 — Turkey
- †Tegenaria lacazei Gourret, 1887 — Palaeogene Aix-en-Provence Chattian lacustrine Limestone
- Tegenaria lapicidinarum Spassky, 1934 — Ukraine, Russia (Europe)
- Tegenaria lehtineni (Guseinov, Marusik & Koponen, 2005) — Azerbaijan
- Tegenaria lenkoranica (Guseinov, Marusik & Koponen, 2005) — Azerbaijan, Iran
- Tegenaria levantina Barrientos, 1981 — Spain
- Tegenaria longimana Simon, 1898 — Turkey, Caucasus (Russia, Georgia)
- Tegenaria lunakensis Tikader, 1964 — Nepal
- Tegenaria lyncea Brignoli, 1978 — Turkey, Azerbaijan
- Tegenaria maelfaiti Bosmans, 2011 — Greece
- Tegenaria mamikonian Brignoli, 1978 — Turkey
- Tegenaria maroccana Denis, 1956 — Morocco
- Tegenaria maronita Simon, 1873 — Syria, Lebanon, Israel
- Tegenaria mediterranea Levy, 1996 — Israel
- Tegenaria melbae Brignoli, 1972 — Turkey
- Tegenaria mercanturensis Bolzern & Hervé, 2010 — France
- Tegenaria michae Brignoli, 1978 — Lebanon
- Tegenaria mirifica Thaler, 1987 — Switzerland, Austria. Italy
- Tegenaria montana Deltshev, 1993 — Bulgaria
- Tegenaria montiszasensis Bolzern, Burckhardt & Hänggi, 2013 — Greece
- Tegenaria nakhchivanica (Guseinov, Marusik & Koponen, 2005) — Azerbaijan
- †Tegenaria obtusa Wunderlich, 2004w — Palaeogene Baltic amber
- Tegenaria oribata Simon, 1916 — France
- Tegenaria pagana C. L. Koch, 1840 — Europe to Central Asia. Introduced to USA, Mexico, Brazil, Chile
- Tegenaria parietina (Fourcroy, 1785) — Europe, North Africa to Israel and Central Asia. Introduced to Jamaica, Paraguay, South Africa, Sri Lanka
- Tegenaria parmenidis Brignoli, 1971 — Italy
- Tegenaria parvula Thorell, 1875 — Italy, Romania
- Tegenaria pasquinii Brignoli, 1978 — Turkey
- Tegenaria percuriosa Brignoli, 1972 — Bulgaria, Turkey
- Tegenaria pieperi Brignoli, 1979 — Greece (Crete)
- Tegenaria pindosiensis Bolzern, Burckhardt & Hänggi, 2013 — Greece
- Tegenaria podoprygorai (Kovblyuk, 2006) — Ukraine
- Tegenaria pontica Charitonov, 1947 — Georgia
- Tegenaria pseudolyncea (Guseinov, Marusik & Koponen, 2005) — Azerbaijan
- Tegenaria racovitzai Simon, 1907 — Spain, France
- Tegenaria ramblae Barrientos, 1978 — Portugal, Spain
- Tegenaria regispyrrhi Brignoli, 1976 — Bulgaria, Greece, Balkans
- Tegenaria rhodiensis Caporiacco, 1948 — Greece (Rhodes), Turkey
- Tegenaria rilaensis Deltshev, 1993 — Macedonia, Bulgaria
- Tegenaria sbordonii Brignoli, 1971 — Italy
- Tegenaria schmalfussi Brignoli, 1976 — Greece (Crete)
- Tegenaria schoenhoferi Bolzern, Burckhardt & Hänggi, 2013 — Greece
- Tegenaria scopifera Barrientos, Ribera & Pons, 2002 — Spain (Balearic Is.)
- Tegenaria serrana Barrientos & Sánchez-Corral, 2013 — Spain
- Tegenaria shillongensis Barman, 1979 — India
- Tegenaria silvestris L. Koch, 1872 — Europe
- Tegenaria talyshica Guseinov, Marusik & Koponen, 2005 — Azerbaijan
- Tegenaria taurica Charitonov, 1947 — Ukraine, Georgia
- Tegenaria tekke Brignoli, 1978 — Turkey
- Tegenaria tridentina L. Koch, 1872 — Europe
- Tegenaria tyrrhenica Dalmas, 1922 — France, Italy
- Tegenaria vallei Brignoli, 1972 — Libya
- Tegenaria vanensis Danişman & Karanfil, 2015 — Turkey
- Tegenaria vankeerorum Bolzern, Burckhardt & Hänggi, 2013 — Greece (Rhodes), Turkey
- Tegenaria vignai Brignoli, 1978 — Turkey
- †Tegenaria virilis Menge in C. L. Koch & Berendt, 18546 — Palaeogene Baltic amber
- Tegenaria wittmeri Brignoli, 1978 — Bhutan
- Tegenaria zagatalensis Guseinov, Marusik & Koponen, 2005 — Azerbaijan
- Tegenaria zamanii Marusik & Omelko, 2014 — Iran

=== Textrix ===
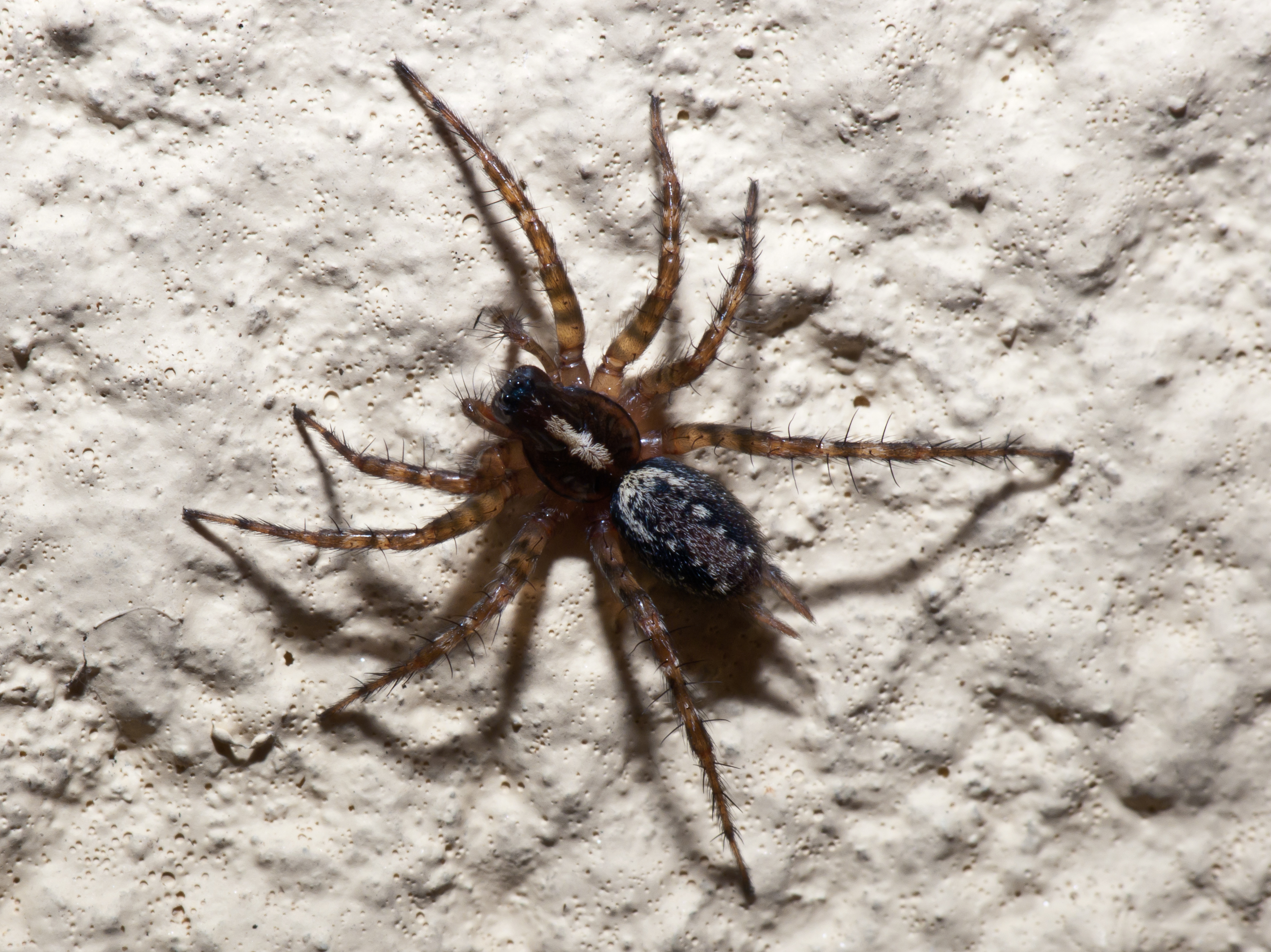
Textrix denticulata

Textrix Sundevall, 1833

- Textrix caudata L. Koch, 1872 — Macaronesia, Northern Africa, Southern Europe, Syria
- Textrix chyzeri de Blauwe, 1980 — Hungary, Bosnia and Herzegovina, Bulgaria
- Textrix denticulata (Olivier, 1789) (type) — Europe, Turkey
- Textrix intermedia Wunderlich, 2008 — France
- Textrix nigromarginata Strand, 1906 — Ethiopia
- Textrix pinicola Simon, 1875 — Portugal to Italy
- Textrix rubrofoliata Pesarini, 1990 — Italy (Sicily)

=== Tikaderia ===
Tikaderia Lehtinen, 1967

- Tikaderia psechrina (Simon, 1906) (type) — Himalayas

=== Tonsilla ===
Tonsilla Wang & Yin, 1992

- Tonsilla defossa Xu & Li, 2006 — China
- Tonsilla distalis Zhang, Zhu & Wang, 2017 — China
- Tonsilla eburniformis Wang & Yin, 1992 — China
- Tonsilla lyrata (Wang, Yin, Peng & Xie, 1990) — China
- Tonsilla makros Wang, 2003 — China
- Tonsilla mopanensis Zhang, Zhu & Wang, 2017 — China
- Tonsilla rostrum Jiang, Chen & Zhang, 2018 — China
- Tonsilla tautispina (Wang, Yin, Peng & Xie, 1990) — China
- Tonsilla truculenta Wang & Yin, 1992 (type) — China
- Tonsilla variegata (Wang, Yin, Peng & Xie, 1990) — China
- Tonsilla yanlingensis (Zhang, Yin & Kim, 2000) — China

=== Tortolena ===
Tortolena Chamberlin & Ivie, 1941

- Tortolena dela Chamberlin & Ivie, 1941 — USA
- Tortolena glaucopis (F. O. Pickard-Cambridge, 1902) (type) — Mexico, Costa Rica

=== Troglocoelotes ===
Troglocoelotes Zhao & S. Q. Li, 2019

- Troglocoelotes bailongensis Zhao & S. Q. Li, 2019 — China
- Troglocoelotes banmenensis Zhao & S. Q. Li, 2019 — China
- Troglocoelotes liangensis Zhao & S. Q. Li, 2019 — China
- Troglocoelotes nongchiensis Zhao & S. Q. Li, 2019 — China
- Troglocoelotes proximus (Chen, Zhu & Kim, 2008) — China
- Troglocoelotes qixianensis Zhao & S. Q. Li, 2019 — China
- Troglocoelotes tortus (Chen, Zhu & Kim, 2008) — China
- Troglocoelotes yosiianus (Nishikawa, 1999) — China
- Troglocoelotes yumiganensis Zhao & S. Q. Li, 2019 (type) — China

=== Tuapoka ===
Tuapoka Forster & Wilton, 1973

- Tuapoka cavata Forster & Wilton, 1973 — New Zealand
- Tuapoka ovalis Forster & Wilton, 1973 (type) — New Zealand

== U-Z ==
=== Urocoras ===
Urocoras Ovtchinnikov, 1999

- Urocoras longispina (Kulczyński, 1897) (type) — Central, Eastern Europe
- Urocoras matesianus (de Blauwe, 1973) — Italy
- Urocoras munieri (Simon, 1880) — Italy, Slovenia, Croatia
- Urocoras nicomedis (Brignoli, 1978) — Turkey

=== Wadotes ===
Wadotes Chamberlin, 1925

- Wadotes bimucronatus (Simon, 1898) — USA
- Wadotes calcaratus (Keyserling, 1887) — USA, Canada
- Wadotes carinidactylus Bennett, 1987 — USA
- Wadotes deceptis Bennett, 1987 — USA
- Wadotes dixiensis Chamberlin, 1925 (type) — USA
- Wadotes georgiensis Howell, 1974 — USA
- Wadotes hybridus (Emerton, 1890) — USA, Canada
- Wadotes mumai Bennett, 1987 — USA
- Wadotes saturnus Bennett, 1987 — USA
- Wadotes tennesseensis Gertsch, 1936 — USA
- Wadotes willsi Bennett, 1987 — USA
