= Asiascape =

Scientific classification
- Kingdom: Animalia
- Phylum: Arthropoda
- Subphylum: Chelicerata
- Class: Arachnida
- Order: Araneae
- Infraorder: Araneomorphae
- Family: Agelenidae
- Genus: Asiascape; Zamani & Marusik, 2020
- Species: A. parthica

Binomial name
- Asiascape parthica Zamani & Marusik, 2020

Genus of spiders

Asiascape is a monotypic genus of Middle Eastern funnel weavers containing the single species, Asiascape parthica. It was first described by Alireza Zamani and Yuri M. Marusik in 2020, and it has only been found in Iran.

== Etymology ==
Asiascape and Persiscape are a combination of the location and -scape, referring to the similarity with Agelescape.
