= Sinodraconarius =

Scientific classification
- Kingdom: Animalia
- Phylum: Arthropoda
- Subphylum: Chelicerata
- Class: Arachnida
- Order: Araneae
- Infraorder: Araneomorphae
- Family: Agelenidae
- Genus: Sinodraconarius; Zhao & S. Q. Li, 2018

Type species
- S. sangjiuensis Zhao & S. Q. Li, 2018

Species
- 5, see text

Genus of spiders

Sinodraconarius is a genus of spiders in the subfamily Coelotinae of the family Agelenidae. The genus was established in 2018 and is endemic to Southwest China, specifically found in Tibet and Yunnan Province.

== Etymology ==
The generic name is derived from its similarity to the genus Draconarius and the Medieval Latin sina, referring to China, indicating the main distribution region of the genus.

== Taxonomy ==
The genus Sinodraconarius was established by Zhao and Li in 2018 as part of ongoing taxonomic revisions within the subfamily Coelotinae. Molecular studies had suggested that the large genus Draconarius was polyphyletic and required taxonomic rearrangements. The new genus was erected to accommodate species that shared distinctive morphological characteristics and formed a monophyletic group in phylogenetic analyses.

Molecular analyses using eight genes from 286 species in 19 genera strongly supported Sinodraconarius as a monophyletic group closely related to Draconarius. More recent phylogenetic studies have shown that Sinodraconarius forms part of a larger clade with other related genera including Yunguirius, Hengconarius, and Nuconarius.

== Description ==
Sinodraconarius spiders have total body length ranging from 6.90 to 17.60 mm. The body is brownish to brown with black setae. The carapace is nearly pear-shaped with a longitudinal fovea and radial grooves. The sternum is brownish and heart-shaped. The opisthosoma is nearly oval, grey to dark grey, with 4–5 grey chevron-like markings.

The chelicerae have three promarginal and two retromarginal teeth. The leg formula is 4123.

=== Males ===
Males of Sinodraconarius are similar to those of Draconarius but can be readily distinguished by their shorter cymbial furrow, which is less than half the length of the cymbium, compared to the longer furrow in Draconarius. Most notably, the patellar apophysis is bifurcate (forked), whereas it is not forked in Draconarius. The male pedipalps also feature a short conductor and embolus, with a long, finger-like median apophysis.

=== Females ===
Females resemble those of Draconarius in having a small epigynal atrium with lateral hoods and centrally located copulatory openings. However, they lack the epigynal teeth that are present in Draconarius females. The atrium is heart-shaped and about twice as long as it is wide, with simple, broadly separated receptacles connected by short copulatory ducts.

== Distribution and habitat ==
Sinodraconarius is restricted to Southwest China, with species known from Tibet and Yunnan Province. The genus appears to be part of the biogeographic pattern seen in many coelotine spider genera, where genus-level distributions are regional and closely linked to geological and climatic events that occurred during the Neogene in Eurasia.

== Species ==
As of October 2026 it contains five species:

- Sinodraconarius cawarongensis Zhao & S. Q. Li, 2018 — Tibet, China
- Sinodraconarius muruoensis Zhao & S. Q. Li, 2018 — Tibet, China
- Sinodraconarius patellabifidus (Wang, 2003) — Yunnan, China
- Sinodraconarius sangjiuensis Zhao & S. Q. Li, 2018 — China (type species)
- Sinodraconarius yui Zhao & S. Q. Li, 2018 — Tibet, China
