= Afrotrix =

Scientific classification
- Kingdom: Animalia
- Phylum: Arthropoda
- Subphylum: Chelicerata
- Class: Arachnida
- Order: Araneae
- Infraorder: Araneomorphae
- Family: Agelenidae
- Subfamily: Ageleninae
- Genus: Afrotrix; Haddad, Zamani & Marusik, 2026

Type species
- A. spicula Haddad, Zamani & Marusik, 2026

Species
- 10, see text

Genus of spiders

Afrotrix is a genus of spiders in the family Agelenidae.

Nine species of Afrotrix are endemic to South Africa, with one species, A. deserticola, also occurring in Namibia and Botswana.

As of October 2026, this genus includes ten species:

- Afrotrix booyseni Haddad, Zamani & Marusik, 2026 – South Africa
- Afrotrix dejagerae Haddad, Zamani & Marusik, 2026 – South Africa
- Afrotrix deserticola (Simon, 1910) – Namibia, Botswana, South Africa
- Afrotrix goegap Haddad, Zamani & Marusik, 2026 – South Africa
- Afrotrix karooica Haddad, Zamani & Marusik, 2026 – South Africa
- Afrotrix lyonsae Haddad, Zamani & Marusik, 2026 – South Africa
- Afrotrix reginaldi Haddad, Zamani & Marusik, 2026 – South Africa
- Afrotrix sauria Haddad, Zamani & Marusik, 2026 – South Africa
- Afrotrix spicula Haddad, Zamani & Marusik, 2026 – South Africa
- Afrotrix tankwa Haddad, Zamani & Marusik, 2026 – South Africa
