= Persilena =

Scientific classification
- Kingdom: Animalia
- Phylum: Arthropoda
- Subphylum: Chelicerata
- Class: Arachnida
- Order: Araneae
- Infraorder: Araneomorphae
- Family: Agelenidae
- Genus: Persilena; Zamani & Marusik, 2020
- Species: P. sengleti

Binomial name
- Persilena sengleti Zamani & Marusik, 2020

Genus of spiders

Persilena is a monotypic genus of Middle Eastern funnel weavers containing the single species, Persilena sengleti. It was first described by Alireza Zamani and Yuri M. Marusik in 2020, and it has only been found in Iran.

== Etymology ==
The name is a combination of "Persia" and Agelena, due to similarities with that genus.
