= Yunguirius =

Scientific classification
- Kingdom: Animalia
- Phylum: Arthropoda
- Subphylum: Chelicerata
- Class: Arachnida
- Order: Araneae
- Infraorder: Araneomorphae
- Family: Agelenidae
- Subfamily: Coelotinae
- Genus: Yunguirius; B. Li, Zhao & S. Q. Li, 2023

Type species
- Coelotes ornatus Wang, Yin, Peng & Xie, 1990

Species
- 9, see text

Genus of spiders

Yunguirius is a Chinese genus of spiders in the family Agelenidae.

== Etymology ==
The genus name is a combination of "Yungui" (Chinese: 雲貴; pinyin: Yúnguì), referring to the Yunnan–Guizhou Plateau where the genus is distributed, and the ending "-rius" it shares with its sister groups of genera, such as Nuconarius, Hengconarius, and Sinodraconarius.

== Distribution ==
Members of Yunguirius were found in Guizhou, Hunan, Sichuan and Yunnan provinces of China.

== Description ==
Spiders in this genus range from 6 to almost 22 mm in body length.

== Species ==
As of October 2026, this genus includes nine species:

- Yunguirius duoge B. Li, Zhao & S. Q. Li, 2023 – China
- Yunguirius ornatus (Wang, Yin, Peng & Xie, 1990) – China (type species)
- Yunguirius parvus Wei & Liu, 2024 – China
- Yunguirius subterebratus (Zhang, Zhu & Wang, 2017) – China
- Yunguirius terebratus (Peng & Wang, 1997) – China
- Yunguirius trigonus Wei & Liu, 2024 – China
- Yunguirius wangqiqiae Wei & Liu, 2024 – China
- Yunguirius xiangding B. Li, Zhao & S. Q. Li, 2023 – China
- Yunguirius xiannushanensis Wei & Liu, 2024 – China
