= Gorbiscape =

Scientific classification
- Kingdom: Animalia
- Phylum: Arthropoda
- Subphylum: Chelicerata
- Class: Arachnida
- Order: Araneae
- Infraorder: Araneomorphae
- Family: Agelenidae
- Genus: Gorbiscape; Zamani & Marusik, 2020

Type species
- G. gorbachevi Zamani & Marusik, 2020

Species
- 8, see text

Genus of spiders

Gorbiscape is a small genus of funnel weavers. It was first described by Alireza Zamani and Yuri M. Marusik in 2020,.

== Distribution ==
First only described from Tajikistan, the genus now also contains species from North Africa, the Canary Islands, and Uzbekistan.

== Etymology ==
The name is a combination of "Gorbi", the nickname for Mikhail Gorbachev, and the ending of Agelescape, to which it is similar.

== Species ==
As of October 2026, this genus includes eight species:

- Gorbiscape agelenoides (Walckenaer, 1841) – Western Mediterranean
- Gorbiscape amazighus Zamani & Marusik, 2025 – Morocco
- Gorbiscape canariensis (Lucas, 1838) – Canary Islands, Morocco, Algeria
- Gorbiscape gomerensis (Wunderlich, 1992) – Canary Islands
- Gorbiscape gonzalezi (Schmidt, 1980) – Canary Islands
- Gorbiscape gorbachevi Zamani & Marusik, 2020 – Tajikistan
- Gorbiscape tenerifensis (Wunderlich, 1992) – Canary Islands
- Gorbiscape zarafshanicus Fomichev & Shodmonov, 2024 – Uzbekistan
