= Namagelena =

Scientific classification
- Kingdom: Animalia
- Phylum: Arthropoda
- Subphylum: Chelicerata
- Class: Arachnida
- Order: Araneae
- Infraorder: Araneomorphae
- Family: Agelenidae
- Subfamily: Ageleninae
- Genus: Namagelena; Haddad, Zamani & Marusik, 2026

Type species
- N. sola Haddad, Zamani & Marusik, 2026

Species
- 2, see text

Genus of spiders

Namagelena is a genus of spiders in the family Agelenidae. It is endemic to South Africa.

As of October 2026, this genus includes two species:

- Namagelena guttata Haddad, Zamani & Marusik, 2026 – South Africa
- Namagelena sola Haddad, Zamani & Marusik, 2026 – South Africa
