= Arcterigone =

Scientific classification
- Kingdom: Animalia
- Phylum: Arthropoda
- Subphylum: Chelicerata
- Class: Arachnida
- Order: Araneae
- Infraorder: Araneomorphae
- Family: Linyphiidae
- Genus: Arcterigone; Eskov & Marusik, 1994
- Species: A. pilifrons

Binomial name
- Arcterigone pilifrons (L. Koch, 1879)

Genus of spiders

Arcterigone is a monotypic genus of dwarf spiders containing the single species, Arcterigone pilifrons. It was first described by K. Y. Eskov & Y. M. Marusik in 1994, and has only been found in Canada, and in Russia.
