= Azerithonica =

Scientific classification
- Kingdom: Animalia
- Phylum: Arthropoda
- Subphylum: Chelicerata
- Class: Arachnida
- Order: Araneae
- Infraorder: Araneomorphae
- Family: Agelenidae
- Genus: Azerithonica
- Species: A. hyrcanica

Binomial name
- Azerithonica hyrcanica Guseinov, Marusik & Koponen, 2005

Genus of spiders

Azerithonica is a genus of Asian funnel weavers containing the single species, Azerithonica hyrcanica. It was first described by E. Guseinov, Yuri M. Marusik & S. Koponen in 2005, and has only been found in Azerbaijan.
