= Zerogone =

Scientific classification
- Kingdom: Animalia
- Phylum: Arthropoda
- Subphylum: Chelicerata
- Class: Arachnida
- Order: Araneae
- Infraorder: Araneomorphae
- Family: Linyphiidae
- Genus: Zerogone; Eskov & Marusik, 1994
- Species: Z. submissella

Binomial name
- Zerogone submissella (Strand, 1907)

Genus of spiders

Zerogone is a monotypic genus of Russian sheet weavers containing the single species, Zerogone submissella. It was first described by K. Y. Eskov & Y. M. Marusik in 1994, and is only found in Russia.
