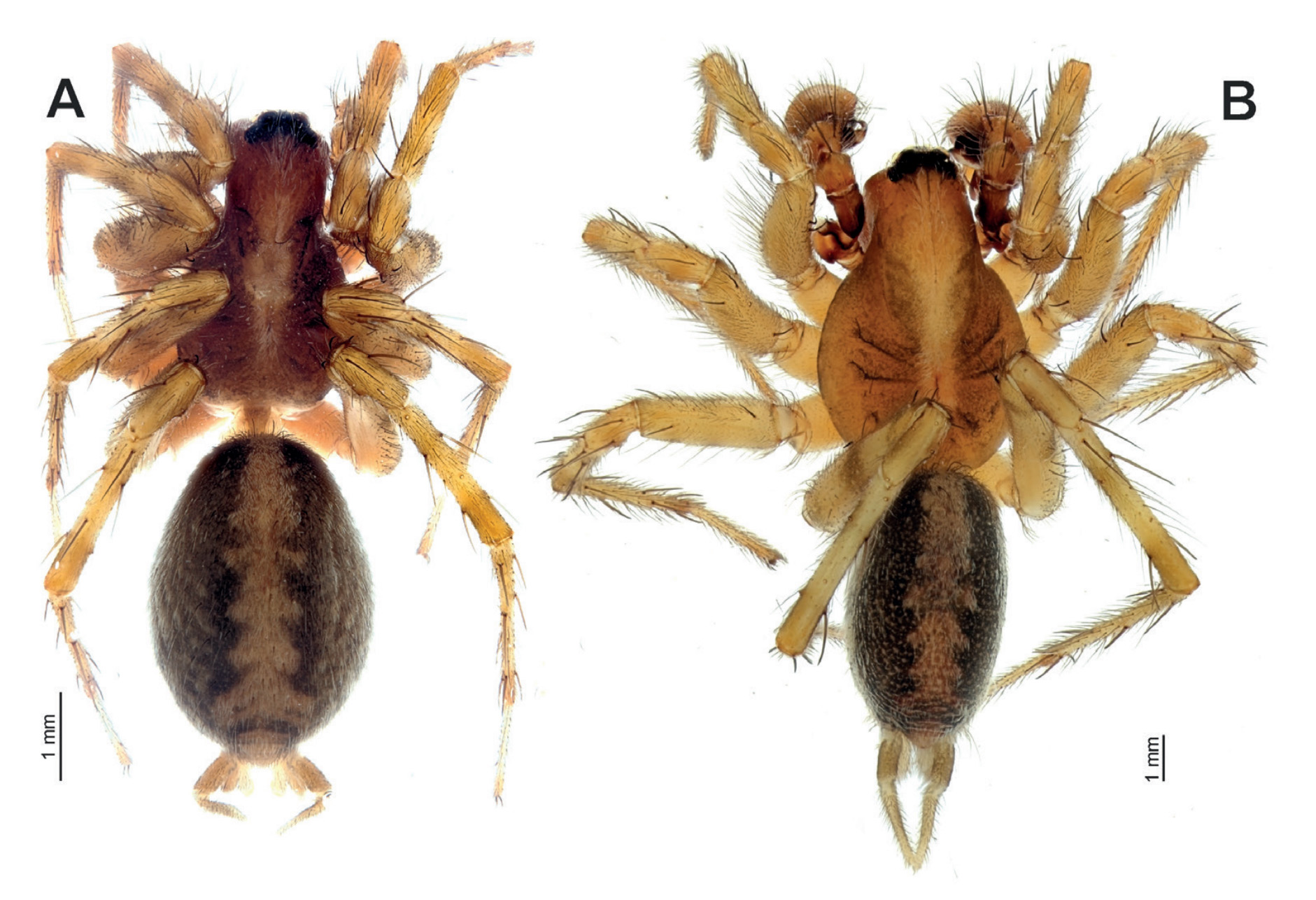
- female and male A. spectabilis
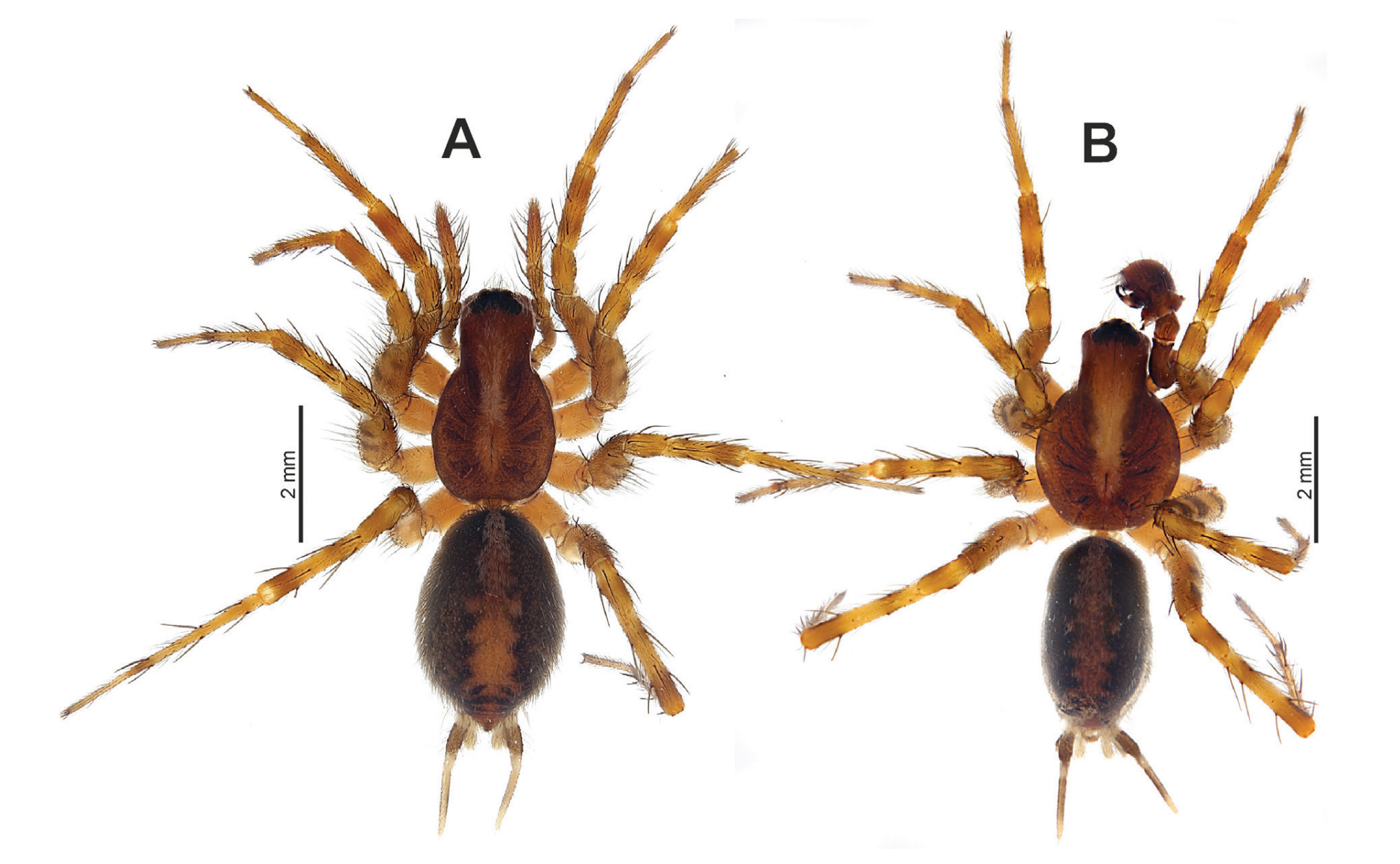
- female and male A. monstrabilis

Scientific classification
- Kingdom: Animalia
- Phylum: Arthropoda
- Subphylum: Chelicerata
- Class: Arachnida
- Order: Araneae
- Infraorder: Araneomorphae
- Family: Agelenidae
- Tribe: Textricini
- Genus: Anatextrix; Kaya, Zamani, Yağmur & Marusik, 2023

Type species
- A. spectabilis Kaya, Zamani, Yağmur & Marusik, 2023

Species
- 2, see text

= Anatextrix =

Genus of spiders

Anatextrix is a genus of spiders in the family Agelenidae.

The copulatory mechanism of Anatetrix has been described in detail.

== Distribution ==
Anatextrix is endemic to Turkey. A. spectabilis has been found in Mersin Province and Adana Province, A. monstrabilis only in Adana Province.

== Etymology ==
The genus name is a combination of Anatolia and related genus Textrix. "spectabilis" and "monstrabilis" both mean "remarkable" in Latin.

== Species ==
As of October 2026, this genus includes two species:

- Anatextrix monstrabilis Kaya, Zamani, Yağmur & Marusik, 2023 – Turkey
- Anatextrix spectabilis Kaya, Zamani, Yağmur & Marusik, 2023 – Turkey
