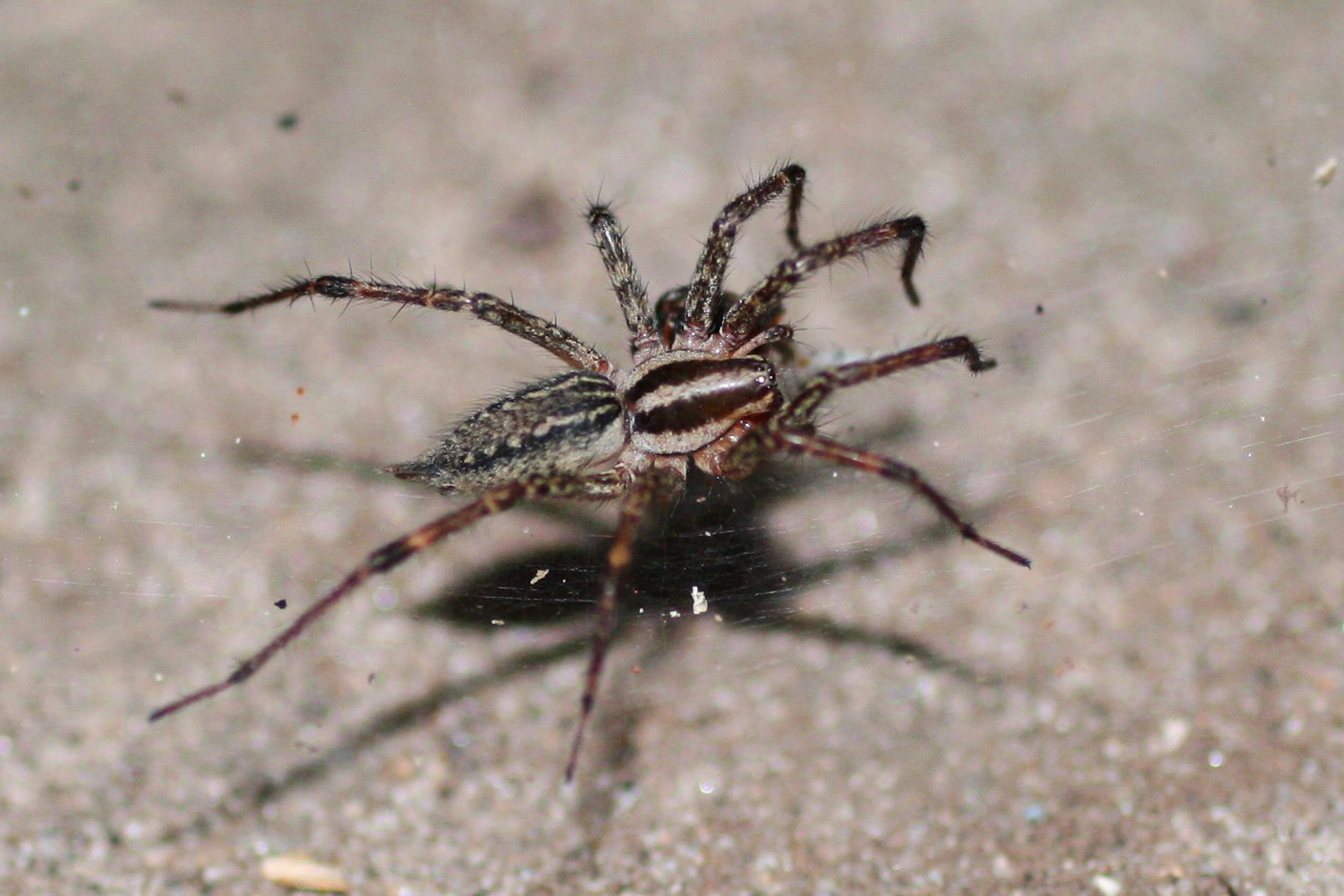
- Grass spider (Agelenopsis sp.), female
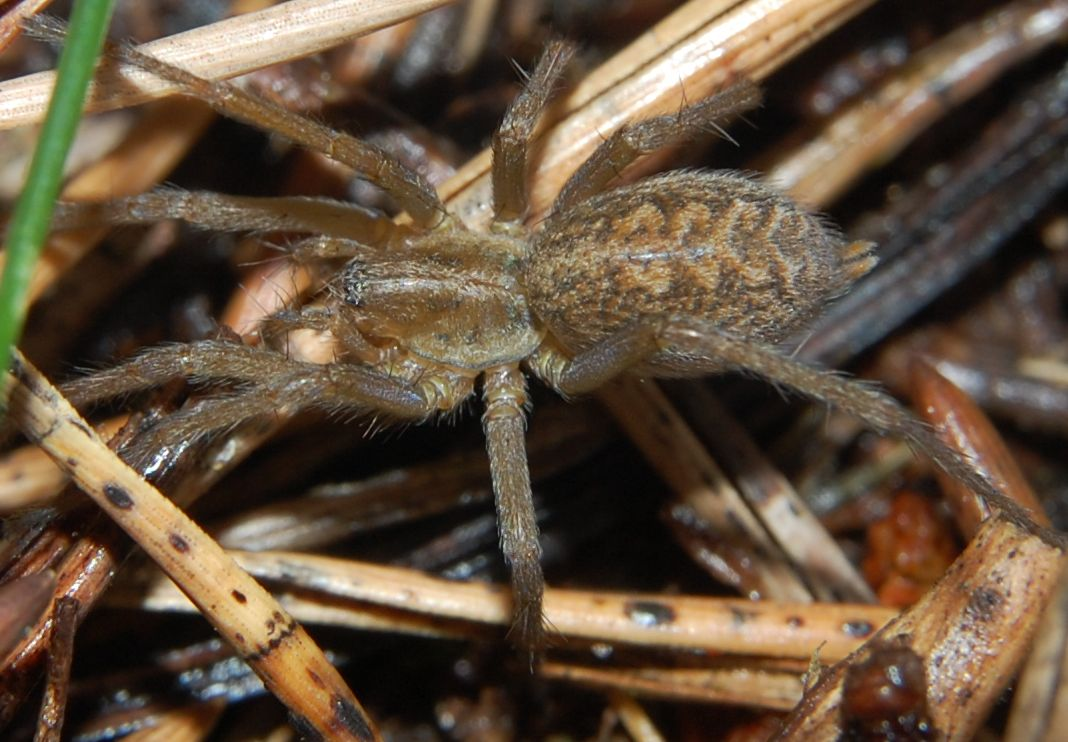
- Hobo spider (E. agrestis)

Scientific classification
- Kingdom: Animalia
- Phylum: Arthropoda
- Subphylum: Chelicerata
- Class: Arachnida
- Order: Araneae
- Infraorder: Araneomorphae
- Clade: Marronoid clade
- Family: Agelenidae; C. L. Koch, 1837

Diversity
- 109 genera, 1,546 species
- blue: reported countries (WSC) green: observation hotspots (iNaturalist)

= Agelenidae =

Funnel weavers Temporal range: Eocene–Recent

Family of spiders

The Agelenidae are a large family of spiders in the suborder Araneomorphae. Well-known examples include the common "grass spiders" of the genus Agelenopsis. The most widely accepted common name for members of the family is funnel weaver.

== Description ==
The body length of the smallest Agelenidae spiders is about 4 mm (0.16 in), excluding the legs, while the larger species grow to 20 mm (0.79 in) long. Some exceptionally large species, such as Eratigena atrica, may reach 5 to 10 cm (2.0 to 3.9 in) in total leg span.

Agelenids have eight eyes in two horizontal rows of four. Their cephalothoraces narrow somewhat towards the front where the eyes are. Their abdomens are more or less oval, usually patterned with two rows of lines and spots. Some species have longitudinal lines on the dorsal surface of the cephalothorax, whereas other species do not; for example, the hobo spider does not, which assists in informally distinguishing it from similar-looking species.

== Biology ==
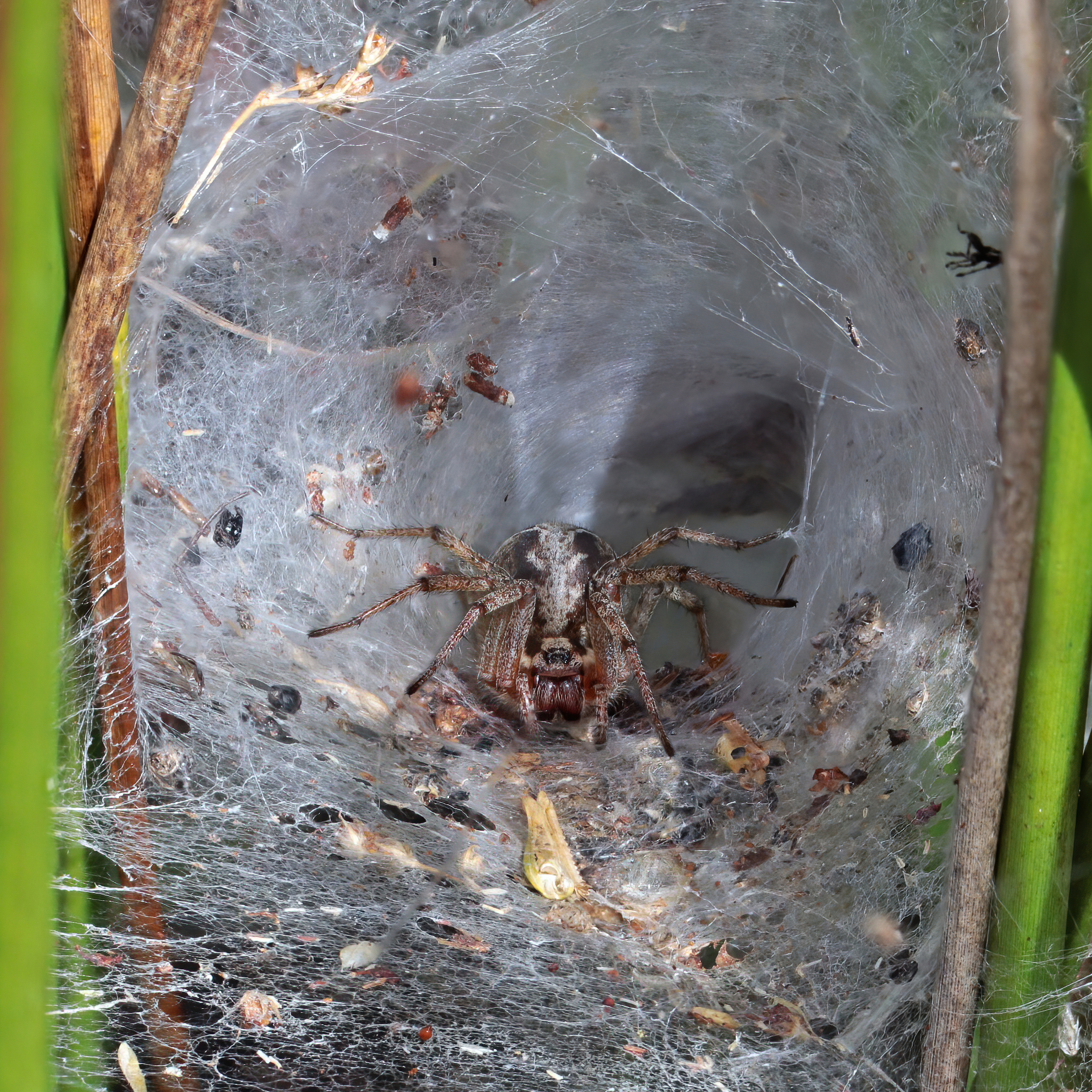
Female Agelena labyrinthica in her web funnel in Belgium.

Most of the Agelenidae are very fast runners, especially on their webs. With speeds clocked at 1.73 ft/s (0.53 m/s), the giant house spider held the Guinness Book of World Records title for top spider speed until 1987. A recent literature review found peer-reviewed accounts of several agelenid species achieving speeds in this range, though some other taxa have achieved higher speeds.

Agelenids build a flat sheet of nonsticky web with a funnel-shaped retreat to one side or occasionally in the middle, depending on the situation and species. Accordingly, "funnel weaver" is the most widely accepted common name for members of the family, but they should not be confused with the so-called "funnel-web tarantulas" or "funnel-web spiders" of mygalomorph families.

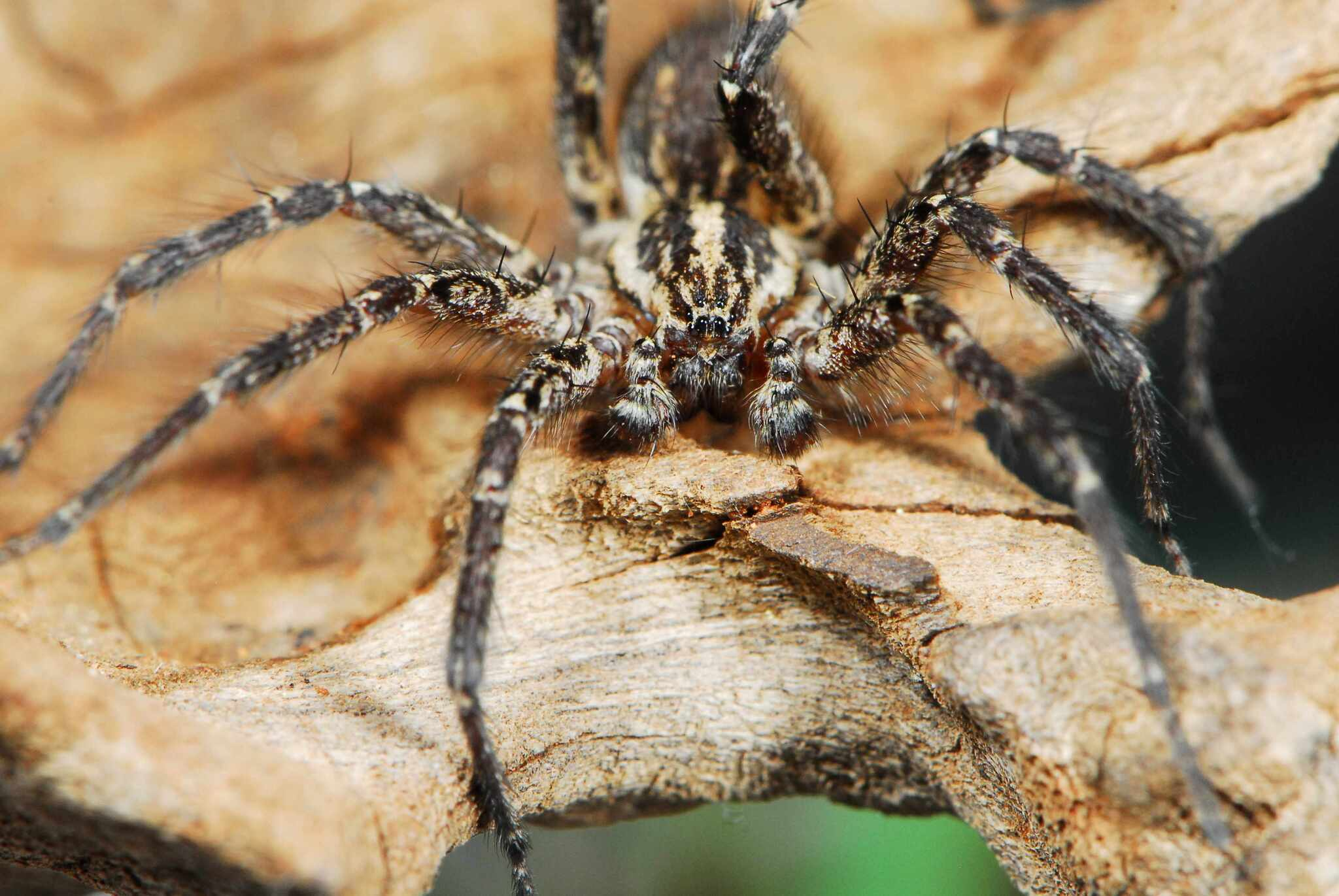
male Benoitia ocellata from South Africa

The typical hunting mode for most sheet-building Agelenidae is similar to that of most other families of spiders that build sheet webs in the open, typically on grass or in scrubland as opposed to under bark, rocks, and the like. They await the arrival of prey such as grasshoppers that fall onto the horizontal web. Although the web is not sticky, it is full of entangling filaments that the spider continually lays down when passing over. The filaments catch in the least projections on a prey insect's body or limbs. The web also is springy, and whether perching on the sheet or awaiting prey in its retreat, the spider reacts immediately to vibrations, whether from a courting male, the threatening struggles of dangerous invaders, or the weaker struggles of potential meals. They attack promising prey by rushing out at high speed and dealing a paralysing venomous bite. The agatoxin in their venom has been studied extensively in Agelenopsis aperta. Once the prey has been disabled, the spider generally drags it back into the retreat and begins to feed. This method of attack is consistent with the high speeds at which the Agelenidae run. Other sheet-web hunters such as some Pisauridae also are very fast runners.

Like any fast-running spider, the Agelenidae possess good vision, and are generally photosensitive (i.e. react to changes in the light), so they can successfully retreat upon perceiving a larger threat's shadow approaching. Some are also sensitive to air currents caused by motion. Males are less successful ambushers than females and are more likely to roam to new territory in search of prey. In September, males of outdoors species (such as Agelenopsis and Agelena) may seek refuge within houses, usually nesting on or underneath outer windowsills, or around a porch door. These spiders often are neither pest controllers nor pests themselves; they are very selective in their prey and do not consume large quantities; also, they return to their webs after being disturbed, unless the web is completely destroyed.

=== Parasocial species ===
The type genus, Agelena, includes some parasocial spiders that live in complex communal webs in Africa. The best known of these is probably A. consociata. Social behaviour in these spiders comprises communal web-building, cooperative prey capture, and communal rearing of young. No trophallaxis occurs, though, nor does any true eusociality such as occurs in the social Hymenoptera (ants, bees, and wasps); for example, the spiders have no castes such as sterile workers or soldiers, and all females are reproductive.

== Genera ==
As of October 2026, this family includes one hundred genera and 1,546 species:

- Acutipetala Dankittipakul & Zhang, 2008 – Thailand
- Aeolocoelotes Okumura, 2020 – Japan
- Afrotrix Haddad, Zamani & Marusik, 2026 – Botswana, Namibia, South Africa
- Agelena Walckenaer, 1805 – Africa, Asia, Russia, Europe to Central Asia, Spain to Central Asia
- Agelenella Lehtinen, 1967 – Yemen
- Agelenopsis Giebel, 1869 – North America. Introduced to Kyrgyzstan, China, Ukraine, Russia
- Ageleradix Xu & Li, 2007 – China
- Agelescape Levy, 1996 – Algeria, Tunisia, Western Asia, Albania, Greece, Spain
- Ahua Forster & Wilton, 1973 – New Zealand
- Allagelena Zhang, Zhu & Song, 2006 – China, Japan, Korea, Thailand, Russia, Europe to Central Asia
- Alloclubionoides Paik, 1992 – China, Japan, Korea, Russia
- Anatextrix Kaya, Zamani, Yağmur & Marusik, 2023 – Turkey
- Antrocoelotes Wang, Irfan, Shi & Zhang, 2026 – China
- Asiascape Zamani & Marusik, 2020 – Iran
- Aterigena Bolzern, Hänggi & Burckhardt, 2010 – China, Italy, France
- Azerithonica Guseinov, Marusik & Koponen, 2005 – Azerbaijan, Iran
- Baiyuerius Zhao, B. Li & S. Li, 2023 – China, Vietnam
- Bajacalilena Maya-Morales & Jiménez, 2017 – Mexico
- Barronopsis Chamberlin & Ivie, 1941 – Bahamas, Cuba, Hispaniola, United States
- Benoitia Lehtinen, 1967 – Africa, Asia, Russia, Cyprus, Spain, North Africa
- Bifidocoelotes Wang, 2002 – China, Taiwan
- Brignoliolus Ovtchinnikov, 1999 – Asia, Russia
- Cabolena Maya-Morales & Jiménez, 2017 – Mexico
- Calilena Chamberlin & Ivie, 1941 – Mexico, United States
- Callidalena Maya-Morales & Jiménez, 2017 – Mexico, United States
- Coelotes Blackwall, 1841 – Asia, Europe, Mexico
- Coras Simon, 1898 – Korea, North America
- Cucullicoelotes Wang, Irfan, Shi & Zhang, 2026 – China
- Curticoelotes Okumura, 2020 – Japan
- Dichodactylus Okumura, 2017 – Japan
- Dolabocoelotes Wang, Irfan, Shi & Zhang, 2026 – China
- Draconarius Ovtchinnikov, 1999 – Asia
- Eratigena Bolzern, Burckhardt & Hänggi, 2013 – Algeria, Morocco, Laos, Madeira, North America, Europe to Central Asia
- Femoracoelotes Wang, 2002 – Japan, Taiwan
- Flexicoelotes Chen, Li & Zhao, 2015 – China
- Forcipocoelotes Wang, Irfan, Shi & Zhang, 2026 – China
- Gorbiscape Zamani & Marusik, 2020 – Algeria, Morocco, Tajikistan, Uzbekistan, Canary Islands, Western Mediterranean
- Griseidraconarius Okumura, 2020 – Japan
- Guilotes Zhao & S. Q. Li, 2018 – China
- Hadites Keyserling, 1862 – Croatia, Slovenia
- Hellamalthonica Bosmans, 2023 – Turkey, Greece
- Hengconarius Zhao & S. Q. Li, 2018 – China
- Himalcoelotes Wang, 2002 – China, Bhutan, Nepal
- Histopona Thorell, 1870 – Europe
- Hoffmannilena Maya-Morales & Jiménez, 2016 – Guatemala, Mexico
- Hololena Chamberlin & Gertsch, 1929 – North America
- Huangyuania Song & Li, 1990 – China
- Huka Forster & Wilton, 1973 – New Zealand
- Hypocoelotes Nishikawa, 2009 – Japan
- Inermocoelotes Ovtchinnikov, 1999 – Europe
- Iwogumoa Kishida, 1955 – Eastern Asia, Russia
- Jishiyu Lin & Li, 2023 – China
- Kidugua Lehtinen, 1967 – DR Congo
- Lagunella Maya-Morales & Jiménez, 2017 – Mexico
- Leptocoelotes Wang, 2002 – China, Taiwan
- Lineacoelotes Xu, Li & Wang, 2008 – China
- Longicoelotes Wang, 2002 – China, Japan
- Lycosoides Lucas, 1846 – Algeria, Morocco, Tunisia, Azerbaijan, Georgia, Jordan, Canary Islands, Southern Europe
- Mahura Forster & Wilton, 1973 – New Zealand
- Maimuna Lehtinen, 1967 – Western Asia, Europe
- Malthonica Simon, 1898 – Kenya, Greece, Portugal
- Melpomene O. Pickard-Cambridge, 1898 – Costa Rica, El Salvador, Panama, Mexico, United States
- Mistaria Lehtinen, 1967 – Africa
- Namagelena Haddad, Zamani & Marusik, 2026 – South Africa
- Neorepukia Forster & Wilton, 1973 – New Zealand
- Neotegenaria Roth, 1967 – Guyana
- Neowadotes Alayón, 1995 – Hispaniola
- Nesiocoelotes Okumura & Zhao, 2022 – Japan
- Notiocoelotes Wang, Xu & Li, 2008 – China, Laos, Thailand, Vietnam
- Notoagelena Tanikawa, Into & Petcharad, 2025 – Thailand
- Novalena Chamberlin & Ivie, 1942 – North America
- Nuconarius Zhao & S. Q. Li, 2018 – China
- Olorunia Lehtinen, 1967 – Democratic Republic of the Congo, Botswana, South Africa
- Oramia Forster, 1964 – Australia, New Zealand
- Oramiella Forster & Wilton, 1973 – New Zealand
- Orumcekia Koçak & Kemal, 2008 – China, Thailand, Vietnam
- Papiliocoelotes Zhao & Li, 2016 – China
- Paramyro Forster & Wilton, 1973 – New Zealand
- Persilena Zamani & Marusik, 2020 – Iran
- Persiscape Zamani & Marusik, 2020 – Western Asia, Greece
- Pireneitega Kishida, 1955 – Asia, Russia, Andorra, Italy, Spain, France
- Platocoelotes Wang, 2002 – China, Japan
- Porotaka Forster & Wilton, 1973 – New Zealand
- Pseudotegenaria Caporiacco, 1934 – Libya
- Robusticoelotes Wang, 2002 – China
- Rothilena Maya-Morales & Jiménez, 2013 – Mexico
- Rualena Chamberlin & Ivie, 1942 – Mexico, United States
- Sinocoelotes Zhao & Li, 2016 – China, Thailand, Vietnam
- Sinodraconarius Zhao & S. Q. Li, 2018 – China
- Songicoelotes Wang, Irfan, Shi & Zhang, 2026 – China
- Spinicoelotes Wang, Irfan, Shi & Zhang, 2026 – China
- Spiricoelotes Wang, 2002 – China, Japan
- Tamgrinia Lehtinen, 1967 – China, India
- Tararua Forster & Wilton, 1973 – New Zealand
- Tegecoelotes Ovtchinnikov, 1999 – China?, Japan, Korea, Russia
- Tegenaria Latreille, 1804 – Worldwide
- Textrix Sundevall, 1833 – Ethiopia, Egypt, Morocco, Syria, Turkey, Europe
- Tikaderia Lehtinen, 1967 – Himalayas
- Tonsilla Wang & Yin, 1992 – China
- Tortolena Chamberlin & Ivie, 1941 – Costa Rica, Mexico, United States
- Troglocoelotes Zhao & S. Q. Li, 2019 – China
- Tuapoka Forster & Wilton, 1973 – New Zealand
- Urocoras Ovtchinnikov, 1999 – Europe
- Vappolotes Zhao & S. Q. Li, 2019 – China
- Wadotes Chamberlin, 1925 – North America
- Xiaocoelotes Wang, Irfan, Shi & Zhang, 2026 – China
- Yinicoelotes Wang, Irfan, Shi & Zhang, 2026 – China
- Yunguirius B. Li, Zhao & S. Q. Li, 2023 – China
- Zhucoelotes Wang, Irfan, Shi & Zhang, 2026 – China

A number of fossil species are known from Eocene aged Baltic amber, but their exact relationship with extant members of the clade is unclear.

Agelenidae
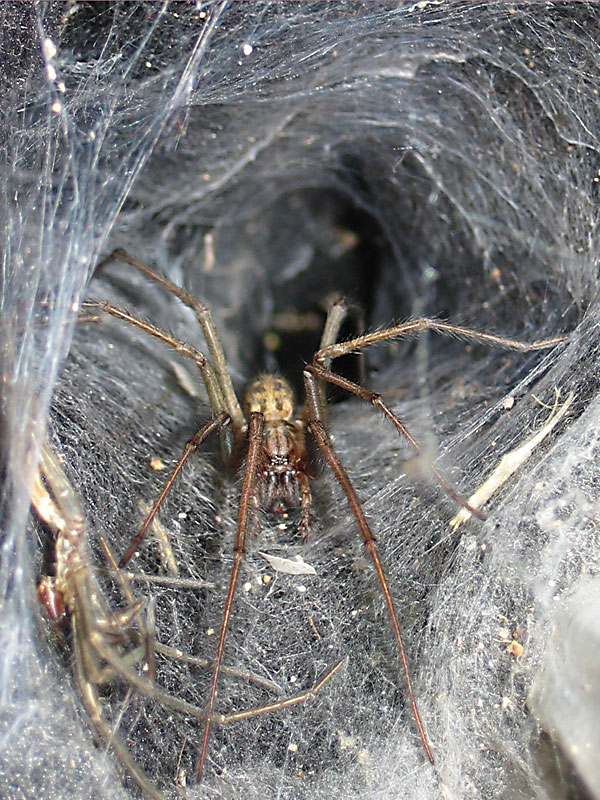
female E. atrica at the mouth of her retreat

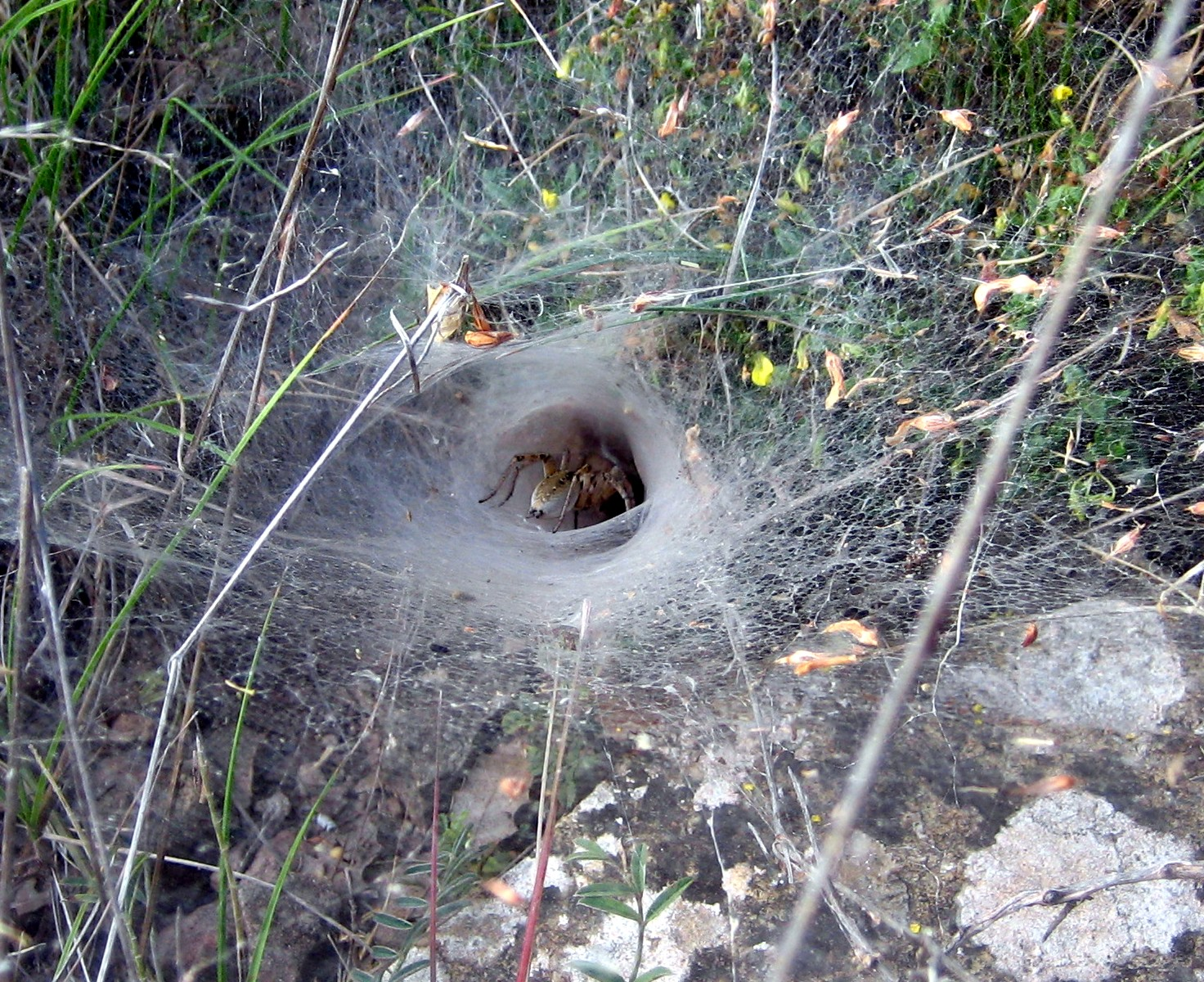
Funnel web of an agelenid from Spain

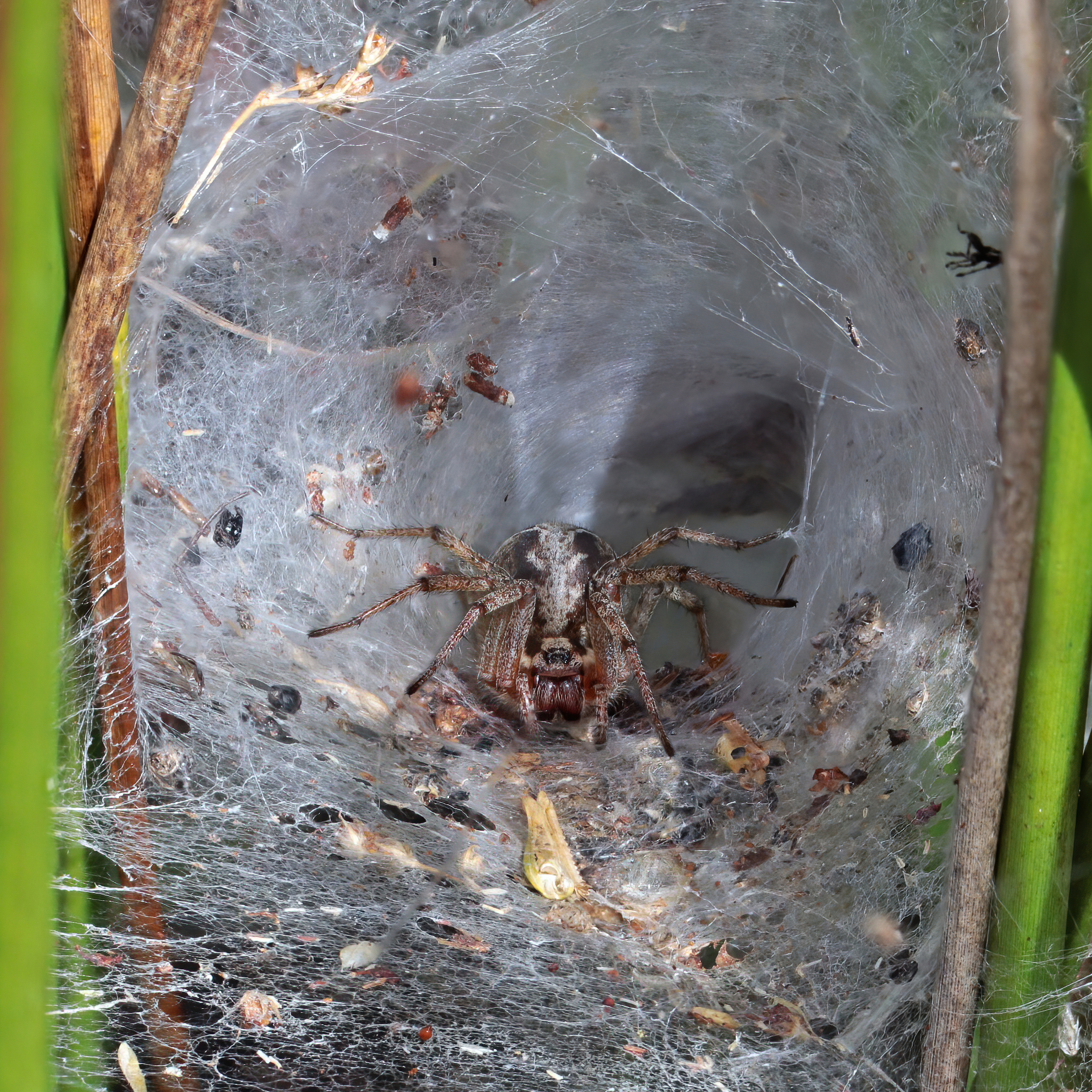
Agelena labyrinthica female in web

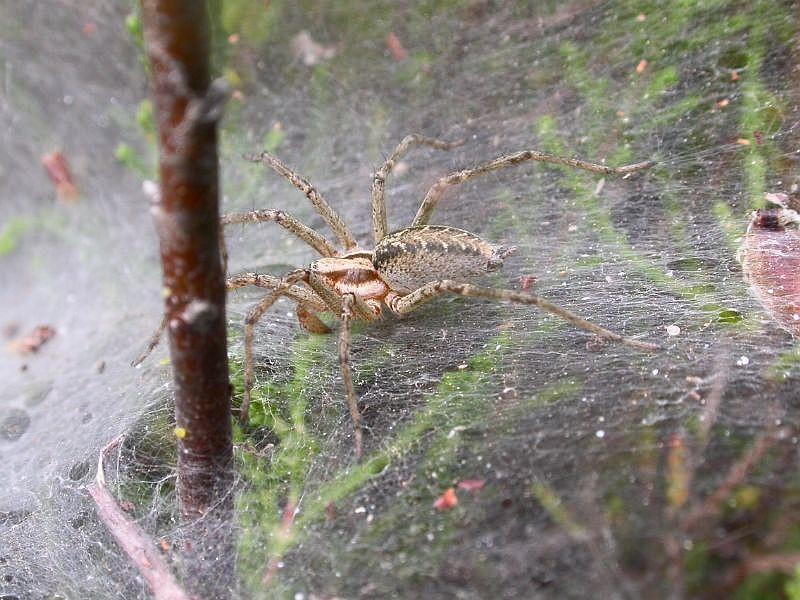
A. labyrinthica, male (immature)
