= Gorbiscape agelenoides =

Scientific classification
- Kingdom: Animalia
- Phylum: Arthropoda
- Subphylum: Chelicerata
- Class: Arachnida
- Order: Araneae
- Infraorder: Araneomorphae
- Family: Agelenidae
- Genus: Gorbiscape
- Species: G. agelenoides

Binomial name
- Gorbiscape agelenoides (Walckenaer, 1842)

Species of spider

Gorbiscape agelenoides, synonym Agelena agelenoides, is a species of spider in the family Agelenidae. It was first described by Walckenaer in 1842. It is commonly found in the western Mediterranean region.
