= Brignoliolus =

Scientific classification
- Kingdom: Animalia
- Phylum: Arthropoda
- Subphylum: Chelicerata
- Class: Arachnida
- Order: Araneae
- Infraorder: Araneomorphae
- Family: Agelenidae
- Genus: Brignoliolus; Ovtchinnikov, 1999

Type species
- Coelotes turkestanicus Ovtchinnikov, 1999

Species
- 9, see text
- blue: reported countries (WSC)

Genus of spiders

Brignoliolus is a genus of spiders in the family Agelenidae.

It is named after Italian arachnologist Paolo Brignoli, who described Coelotes arganoi, now a member of this genus.

== Distribution ==
Brignoliolus is distributed across the Middle East, the Caucasus region, and Central Asia. The genus occurs in Turkey, the Levant (Lebanon, Israel), Iran, and the Central Asian republics (Kazakhstan, Uzbekistan, Kyrgyzstan, Tajikistan, and Turkmenistan), with one species extending into the Ural Mountains of Russia.

== Species ==
As of October 2026, this genus includes nine species:

- Brignoliolus arganoi (Brignoli, 1978) – Turkey
- Brignoliolus caudatus (de Blauwe, 1973) – Lebanon
- Brignoliolus charitonovi (Spassky, 1939) – Iran, Uzbekistan, Kyrgyzstan, Turkmenistan, Tajikistan
- Brignoliolus coenobita (Brignoli, 1978) – Turkey
- Brignoliolus juglandicola (Ovtchinnikov, 1984) – Kyrgyzstan
- Brignoliolus nenilini (Ovtchinnikov, 1999) – Uzbekistan
- Brignoliolus ovchinnikovi Zonstein & Marusik, 2024 – Israel
- Brignoliolus turkestanicus (Ovtchinnikov, 1999) – Russia (Urals), Kazakhstan, Kyrgyzstan, Uzbekistan (type species)
- Brignoliolus vignai (Brignoli, 1978) – Turkey
