= Jishiyu =

Scientific classification
- Kingdom: Animalia
- Phylum: Arthropoda
- Subphylum: Chelicerata
- Class: Arachnida
- Order: Araneae
- Infraorder: Araneomorphae
- Family: Agelenidae
- Genus: Jishiyu; Lin & Li, 2023
- Species: J. songjiang

Binomial name
- Jishiyu songjiang Lin & Li, 2023

Species of spider

Jishiyu is a monotypic genus of spiders in the family Agelenidae containing the single species, Jishiyu songjiang.

== Etymology ==
The genus is named after the nickname Jishiyu (Chinese: 及時雨; pinyin: Jíshíyǔ, "timely rain") for Song Jiang (Chinese: 宋江; pinyin: Sòng Jiāng), one of the 108 outlaws in the classical Chinese literature "Outlaws of the Marsh" (Chinese: 水滸傳; pinyin: Shuǐhǔ Zhuàn). The species is named after the same outlaw.

== Distribution ==
Jishiyu songjiang has been recorded from Yunnan Province in China.

== Description ==
These are medium-sized spiders, with a body length of around 7 mm.

== Taxonomy ==
The genus is related to Orumcekia Koçak & Kemal, 2008.
