= Persiscape =

Scientific classification
- Kingdom: Animalia
- Phylum: Arthropoda
- Subphylum: Chelicerata
- Class: Arachnida
- Order: Araneae
- Infraorder: Araneomorphae
- Family: Agelenidae
- Genus: Persiscape; Zamani & Marusik, 2020

Type species
- P. levyi (Guseinov, Marusik & Koponen, 2005)

Species
- 7, see text

Genus of spiders

Persiscape is a genus of funnel weavers first described by Alireza Zamani and Yuri M. Marusik in 2020.

== Species ==
As of October 2026, this genus includes seven species:

- Persiscape caspica Zamani & Marusik, 2020 – Iran
- Persiscape caucasica (Guseinov, Marusik & Koponen, 2005) – Greece, Turkey, Georgia, Armenia, Azerbaijan
- Persiscape ecbatana Zamani & Marusik, 2020 – Iran
- Persiscape gideoni (Levy, 1996) – Turkey, Georgia, Armenia, Azerbaijan, Israel, Iran
- Persiscape levyi (Guseinov, Marusik & Koponen, 2005) – Azerbaijan, Iran
- Persiscape nassirkhanii Zamani & Marusik, 2020 – Iran
- Persiscape zagrosensis Zamani & Marusik, 2020 – Iran
