= Parawubanoides =

Scientific classification
- Kingdom: Animalia
- Phylum: Arthropoda
- Subphylum: Chelicerata
- Class: Arachnida
- Order: Araneae
- Infraorder: Araneomorphae
- Family: Linyphiidae
- Genus: Parawubanoides; Eskov & Marusik, 1992
- Species: P. unicornis

Binomial name
- Parawubanoides unicornis (O. Pickard-Cambridge, 1873)

Genus of spiders

Parawubanoides is a monotypic genus of Asian dwarf spiders containing the single species, Parawubanoides unicornis. It was first described by K. Y. Eskov & Y. M. Marusik in 1992, and has only been found in Russia and Mongolia.
