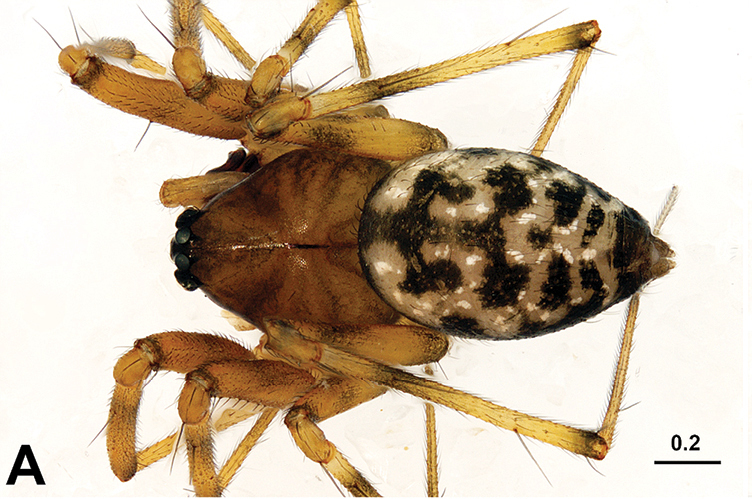
- A. beijingensis, male

Scientific classification
- Kingdom: Animalia
- Phylum: Arthropoda
- Subphylum: Chelicerata
- Class: Arachnida
- Order: Araneae
- Infraorder: Araneomorphae
- Family: Linyphiidae
- Genus: Acanoides; Sun, Marusik & Tu, 2014

Species
- Acanoides beijingensis Sun, Marusik & Tu, 2014; Acanoides hengshanensis (Chen & Yin, 2000)

= Acanoides =

Genus of spiders

Acanoides is a genus of sheet weavers first described in 2014. As of February 2019, it contains only two species, both in China.
