= Ageleradix =

Scientific classification
- Kingdom: Animalia
- Phylum: Arthropoda
- Subphylum: Chelicerata
- Class: Arachnida
- Order: Araneae
- Infraorder: Araneomorphae
- Family: Agelenidae
- Genus: Ageleradix; Xu & Li, 2007

Type species
- A. sichuanensis Xu & Li, 2007

Species
- 6, see text

Genus of spiders

Ageleradix is a genus of Chinese funnel weavers first described by Xu & Li in 2007.

== Species ==
As of October 2026, this genus includes nine species:

- Ageleradix cymbiforma (Wang, 1991) – China
- Ageleradix dulong Mu, Wang & Zhang, 2025 – China
- Ageleradix jinfoshan Mu, Wang & Zhang, 2025 – China
- Ageleradix nangunhe Mu, Wang & Zhang, 2025 – China
- Ageleradix otiforma (Wang, 1991) – China
- Ageleradix schwendingeri Zhang, Li & Xu, 2008 – China
- Ageleradix sichuanensis Xu & Li, 2007 – China
- Ageleradix sternseptum Zhang, Li & Xu, 2008 – China
- Ageleradix zhishengi Zhang, Li & Xu, 2008 – China
