= Platocoelotes =

Scientific classification
- Kingdom: Animalia
- Phylum: Arthropoda
- Subphylum: Chelicerata
- Class: Arachnida
- Order: Araneae
- Infraorder: Araneomorphae
- Family: Agelenidae
- Genus: Platocoelotes; Wang, 2002

Type species
- P. impletus (Peng & Wang, 1997)

Species
- 23, see text

Genus of spiders

Platocoelotes is a genus of East Asian funnel weavers first described by X. P. Wang in 2002. They are all found in China except for Platocoelotes uenoi, found in Japan.

== Species ==
As of October 2026 it contains twenty-three species:

- Platocoelotes ampulliformis Liu & Li, 2008 – China
- Platocoelotes bifidus Yin, Xu & Yan, 2010 – China
- Platocoelotes brevis Liu & Li, 2008 – China
- Platocoelotes daweishanensis Xu & Li, 2008 – China
- Platocoelotes fanjingshan Jiang, Chen & Zhang, 2018 – China
- Platocoelotes furcatus Liu & Li, 2008 – China
- Platocoelotes globosus Xu & Li, 2008 – China
- Platocoelotes icohamatoides (Peng & Wang, 1997) – China
- Platocoelotes imperfectus Wang & Jäger, 2007 – China
- Platocoelotes impletus (Peng & Wang, 1997) – China
- Platocoelotes kailiensis Wang, 2003 – China
- Platocoelotes latus Xu & Li, 2008 – China
- Platocoelotes lichuanensis (Chen & Zhao, 1998) – China
- Platocoelotes luoi Chen & Li, 2015 – China
- Platocoelotes paralatus Xu & Li, 2008 – China
- Platocoelotes polyptychus Xu & Li, 2007 – China
- Platocoelotes qinglinensis Chen & Li, 2015 – China
- Platocoelotes shuiensis Chen & Li, 2015 – China
- Platocoelotes strombuliformis Liu & Li, 2008 – China
- Platocoelotes tianyangensis Chen & Li, 2015 – China
- Platocoelotes uenoi (Yamaguchi & Yaginuma, 1971) – Japan
- Platocoelotes xianwuensis Chen & Li, 2015 – China
- Platocoelotes zhuchuandiani Liu & Li, 2012 – China
