= Acutipetala =

Scientific classification
- Kingdom: Animalia
- Phylum: Arthropoda
- Subphylum: Chelicerata
- Class: Arachnida
- Order: Araneae
- Infraorder: Araneomorphae
- Family: Agelenidae
- Genus: Acutipetala; Dankittipakul & Zhang, 2008

Type species
- A. octoginta Dankittipakul & Zhang, 2008

Species
- Acutipetala donglini Dankittipakul & Zhang, 2008; Acutipetala octoginta Dankittipakul & Zhang, 2008

Genus of spiders

Acutipetala is a small genus of southeast Asian funnel weavers native to the evergreen forests of northern Thailand. They are medium-sized spiders, 6.7 millimetres (0.26 in) to 8.8 millimetres (0.35 in) long, and are distinguished by the distinctive appearance of several genital structures, including the embolus and the median apophysis of the male pedipalp. The eyes are in two rows, both of which are strongly curved forward.

The genus was first described by P. Dankittipakul and Z. S. Zhang in 2008. As of October 2026 it contains only two species: A. donglini and A. octoginta. The name is a combination of the Latin "acutus", meaning "sharp", and the Greek "petalon" (πετάλων), in reference to the sharp, flower petal shape of the medial apophysis of the male pedipalp.
