= Pseudotegenaria =

Scientific classification
- Domain: Eukaryota
- Kingdom: Animalia
- Phylum: Arthropoda
- Subphylum: Chelicerata
- Class: Arachnida
- Order: Araneae
- Infraorder: Araneomorphae
- Family: Agelenidae
- Genus: Pseudotegenaria
- Species: P. parva

Binomial name
- Pseudotegenaria parva Caporiacco, 1934

Genus of spiders

Pseudotegenaria is a genus of North African funnel weavers containing the single species, Pseudotegenaria parva. It was first described by Lodovico di Caporiacco in 1934, and has only been found in Libya.
