= Hypocoelotes =

Scientific classification
- Domain: Eukaryota
- Kingdom: Animalia
- Phylum: Arthropoda
- Subphylum: Chelicerata
- Class: Arachnida
- Order: Araneae
- Infraorder: Araneomorphae
- Family: Agelenidae
- Genus: Hypocoelotes
- Species: H. tumidivulva

Binomial name
- Hypocoelotes tumidivulva Nishikawa, 2009

Genus of spiders

Hypocoelotes is a genus of East Asian funnel weavers containing the single species, Hypocoelotes tumidivulva. It was first described by Y. Nishikawa in 2009, and has only been found in Japan.
