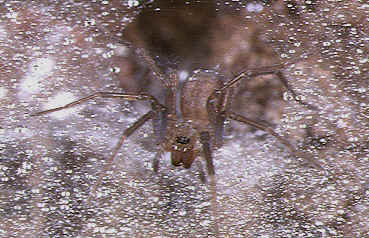
- female S. urumensis

Scientific classification
- Kingdom: Animalia
- Phylum: Arthropoda
- Subphylum: Chelicerata
- Class: Arachnida
- Order: Araneae
- Infraorder: Araneomorphae
- Family: Agelenidae
- Genus: Spiricoelotes; Wang, 2002

Species
- 9, see text

= Spiricoelotes =

Genus of spiders

Spiricoelotes is a genus of East Asian funnel weavers first described by X. P. Wang in 2002.

== Species ==
As of October 2026 it contains eleven species:

- Spiricoelotes anshiensis Chen & Li, 2016 – China
- Spiricoelotes chufengensis Chen & Li, 2016 – China
- Spiricoelotes metyr Chen, Liu & Wei, 2025 – China
- Spiricoelotes nansheensis Chen & Li, 2016 – China
- Spiricoelotes pseudozonatus Wang, 2003 – China
- Spiricoelotes taipingensis Chen & Li, 2016 – China
- Spiricoelotes urumensis (Shimojana, 1989) – Japan (Ryukyu Is.)
- Spiricoelotes xianheensis Chen & Li, 2016 – China
- Spiricoelotes xiongxinensis Chen & Li, 2016 – China
- Spiricoelotes zhengi Chen, Liu & Wei, 2025 – China
- Spiricoelotes zonatus (Peng & Wang, 1997) – China, Japan
