= Papiliocoelotes =

Scientific classification
- Kingdom: Animalia
- Phylum: Arthropoda
- Subphylum: Chelicerata
- Class: Arachnida
- Order: Araneae
- Infraorder: Araneomorphae
- Family: Agelenidae
- Genus: Papiliocoelotes; Zhao & Li, 2016

Species
- Papiliocoelotes guanyinensis Zhao & Li, 2016; Papiliocoelotes guitangensis Zhao & Li, 2016; Papiliocoelotes jiepingensis Zhao & Li, 2016; Papiliocoelotes meiyuensis Zhao & Li, 2016; Papiliocoelotes yezhouensis Zhao & Li, 2016

Genus of spiders

Papiliocoelotes is a genus of spiders in the family Agelenidae. It was first described in 2016 by Zhao & Li. As of 2026, it contains five species, all of which are found in China.
