= Leptocoelotes =

Scientific classification
- Kingdom: Animalia
- Phylum: Arthropoda
- Subphylum: Chelicerata
- Class: Arachnida
- Order: Araneae
- Infraorder: Araneomorphae
- Family: Agelenidae
- Genus: Leptocoelotes; Wang, 2002

Type species
- L. pseudoluniformis (Zhang, Peng & Kim, 1997)

Species
- L. edentulus (Wang & Ono, 1998) – Taiwan; L. pseudoluniformis (Zhang, Peng & Kim, 1997) – China

Genus of spiders

Leptocoelotes is a genus of East Asian funnel weavers first described by X. P. Wang in 2002. As of October 2026 it contains only two species.
