= Hoffmannilena =

Scientific classification
- Kingdom: Animalia
- Phylum: Arthropoda
- Subphylum: Chelicerata
- Class: Arachnida
- Order: Araneae
- Infraorder: Araneomorphae
- Family: Agelenidae
- Genus: Hoffmannilena; Maya-Morales & Jiménez, 2016

Species
- 9, see text

Genus of spiders

Hoffmannilena is a genus of spiders in the family Agelenidae. It was first described in 2016 by Julieta Maya-Morales and María Luisa Jiménez. This genus was named in honour of Anita Hoffmann. As of October 2026, it contains 9 species: 8 from Mexico, and 1, H. nova, from Guatemala.

== Species ==
Hoffmannilena comprises the following species:

- Hoffmannilena apoala Maya-Morales & Jiménez, 2016
- Hoffmannilena cumbre Maya-Morales & Jiménez, 2016
- Hoffmannilena huajuapan Maya-Morales & Jiménez, 2016
- Hoffmannilena lobata (F. O. Pickard-Cambridge, 1902)
- Hoffmannilena marginata (F. O. Pickard-Cambridge, 1902)
- Hoffmannilena mitla Maya-Morales & Jiménez, 2016
- Hoffmannilena nova (O. Pickard-Cambridge, 1896)
- Hoffmannilena tizayuca Maya-Morales & Jiménez, 2016 (type)
- Hoffmannilena variabilis (F. O. Pickard-Cambridge, 1902)
