= Robusticoelotes =

Scientific classification
- Kingdom: Animalia
- Phylum: Arthropoda
- Subphylum: Chelicerata
- Class: Arachnida
- Order: Araneae
- Infraorder: Araneomorphae
- Family: Agelenidae
- Genus: Robusticoelotes; Wang, 2002

Type species
- R. pichoni (Schenkel, 1963)

Species
- R. pichoni (Schenkel, 1963) – China; R. sanmenensis (Tang, Yin & Zhang, 2002) – China; R. subpichoni Zhang, Zhu & Wang, 2017 – China

Genus of spiders

Robusticoelotes is a genus of East Asian funnel weavers first described by X. P. Wang in 2002. As of October 2026 it contains only three species.
