= Notoagelena =

Scientific classification
- Kingdom: Animalia
- Phylum: Arthropoda
- Subphylum: Chelicerata
- Class: Arachnida
- Order: Araneae
- Infraorder: Araneomorphae
- Family: Agelenidae
- Genus: Notoagelena; Tanikawa, Into & Petcharad, 2025
- Species: N. silvicola

Binomial name
- Notoagelena silvicola Tanikawa, Into & Petcharad, 2025

Species of spider

Notoagelena is a monotypic genus of spiders in the family Agelenidae containing the single species, Notoagelena silvicola.

== Distribution ==
Notoagelena silvicola is endemic to Thailand.

== Etymology ==
The genus name is a combination of Ancient Greek noto "southern" and related genus Agelena. The species name means "forest-dwelling" in Latin.
