= Rualena =

Scientific classification
- Kingdom: Animalia
- Phylum: Arthropoda
- Subphylum: Chelicerata
- Class: Arachnida
- Order: Araneae
- Infraorder: Araneomorphae
- Family: Agelenidae
- Genus: Rualena; Chamberlin & Ivie, 1942

Type species
- R. surana Chamberlin & Ivie, 1942

Species
- 14, see text

Genus of spiders

Rualena is a genus of North American funnel weavers first described by R. V. Chamberlin & Wilton Ivie in 1942.

== Species ==
As of October 2026, it contains fourteen species found in the United States and Mexico:

- Rualena alleni Chamberlin & Ivie, 1942 – USA
- Rualena avila Chamberlin & Ivie, 1942 – USA
- Rualena balboae (Schenkel, 1950) – USA
- Rualena cavata (F. O. Pickard-Cambridge, 1902) – Mexico
- Rualena cedros Maya-Morales & Jiménez, 2016 – Mexico
- Rualena cockerelli Chamberlin & Ivie, 1942 – USA
- Rualena cruzana Chamberlin & Ivie, 1942 – USA
- Rualena magnacava Chamberlin & Ivie, 1942 – USA, Mexico
- Rualena parritas Maya-Morales & Jiménez, 2016 – Mexico
- Rualena pasquinii Brignoli, 1974 – Mexico
- Rualena rua (Chamberlin, 1919) – USA
- Rualena surana Chamberlin & Ivie, 1942 – USA
- Rualena thomas Maya-Morales & Jiménez, 2016 – USA
- Rualena ubicki Maya-Morales & Jiménez, 2016 – Mexico
