= Tamgrinia =

Scientific classification
- Kingdom: Animalia
- Phylum: Arthropoda
- Subphylum: Chelicerata
- Class: Arachnida
- Order: Araneae
- Infraorder: Araneomorphae
- Family: Agelenidae
- Genus: Tamgrinia; Lehtinen, 1967

Type species
- T. alveolifera (Schenkel, 1936)

Species
- 8, see text

Genus of spiders

Tamgrinia is a genus of Asian funnel weavers first described by Pekka T. Lehtinen in 1967. They are found in the humid forests of the Himalayas.

== Species ==
As of October 2026 it contains eight species:

- Tamgrinia alveolifera (Schenkel, 1936) – India, China
- Tamgrinia coelotiformis (Schenkel, 1963) – China
- Tamgrinia laticeps (Schenkel, 1936) – China
- Tamgrinia palpator (Hu & Li, 1987) – China
- Tamgrinia rectangularis Xu & Li, 2006 – China
- Tamgrinia semiserrata Xu & Li, 2006 – China
- Tamgrinia tibetana (Hu & Li, 1987) – China
- Tamgrinia tulugouensis Wang, 2000 – China

== Description ==
They have a reddish-brown elongate carapace, with short white and long black setae. They have a dark brown abdomen that has dark maculae.
