= Callidalena =

Scientific classification
- Kingdom: Animalia
- Phylum: Arthropoda
- Subphylum: Chelicerata
- Class: Arachnida
- Order: Araneae
- Infraorder: Araneomorphae
- Family: Agelenidae
- Genus: Callidalena; Maya-Morales & Jiménez, 2017

Type species
- C. quintin Maya-Morales & Jiménez, 2017

Species
- C. quintin Maya-Morales & Jiménez, 2017 — Mexico; C. tijuana Maya-Morales & Jiménez, 2017 — USA, Mexico

Genus of spiders

Callidalena is a genus of funnel weavers first described by J. Maya-Morales and M. L. Jiménez in 2017. As of October 2026 it contains only two species.
