= Dichodactylus =

Scientific classification
- Kingdom: Animalia
- Phylum: Arthropoda
- Subphylum: Chelicerata
- Class: Arachnida
- Order: Araneae
- Infraorder: Araneomorphae
- Family: Agelenidae
- Genus: Dichodactylus; Okumura, 2017

Type species
- D. tarumii (Arita, 1976)

Species
- 4, see text

Genus of spiders

Dichodactylus is a genus of Japanese funnel weavers first described by K. I. Okumura in 2017.

== Species ==
As of October 2026 it contains four species:

- Dichodactylus inabaensis (Arita, 1974) — Japan
- Dichodactylus satoi (Nishikawa, 2003) — Japan
- Dichodactylus shinshuensis Okumura, 2017 — Japan
- Dichodactylus tarumii (Arita, 1976) — Japan
