= Griseidraconarius =

Scientific classification
- Kingdom: Animalia
- Phylum: Arthropoda
- Subphylum: Chelicerata
- Class: Arachnida
- Order: Araneae
- Infraorder: Araneomorphae
- Family: Agelenidae
- Genus: Griseidraconarius; Okumura, 2020

Type species
- G. decolor (Nishikawa, 1973)

Species
- Griseidraconarius akakinaensis (Shimojana, 2000); Griseidraconarius decolor (Nishikawa, 1973); Griseidraconarius iheyaensis (Shimojana, 2000); Griseidraconarius iriei (Okumura, 2013)

Genus of spiders

Griseidraconarius is a genus of east Asian funnel weavers. It was first described by K. Okumura in 2020, and it has only been found in Japan. As of October 2026 it contains four species: G. akakinaensis, G. decolor, G. iheyaensis, and G. iriei.
