= Aeolocoelotes =

Scientific classification
- Kingdom: Animalia
- Phylum: Arthropoda
- Subphylum: Chelicerata
- Class: Arachnida
- Order: Araneae
- Infraorder: Araneomorphae
- Family: Agelenidae
- Genus: Aeolocoelotes; Okumura, 2020

Type species
- A. unicatus (Yaginuma, 1977)

Species
- 8, see text

Genus of spiders

Aeolocoelotes is a genus of east Asian funnel weavers. It was first described by K. Okumura in 2020, and it has only been found in Japan.

== Species ==
As of October 2026 it contains eight species:

- A. bifurcatus (Okumura & Ono, 2006) – Japan
- A. cornutus (Nishikawa, 2009) – Japan
- A. mohrii (Nishikawa, 2009) – Japan
- A. personatus (Nishikawa, 1973) – Japan
- A. saikaiensis (Okumura, 2013) – Japan
- A. sanoi (Nishikawa, 2009) – Japan
- A. unicatus (Yaginuma, 1977) – Japan
- A. unzenensis (Okumura, 2013) – Japan
