= Kidugua =

Scientific classification
- Domain: Eukaryota
- Kingdom: Animalia
- Phylum: Arthropoda
- Subphylum: Chelicerata
- Class: Arachnida
- Order: Araneae
- Infraorder: Araneomorphae
- Family: Agelenidae
- Genus: Kidugua
- Species: K. spiralis

Binomial name
- Kidugua spiralis Lehtinen, 1967

Genus of spiders

Kidugua is a genus of Central African funnel weavers containing the single species, Kidugua spiralis. It was first described by Pekka T. Lehtinen in 1967, and has only been found in Africa.
