= Tikaderia =

Scientific classification
- Domain: Eukaryota
- Kingdom: Animalia
- Phylum: Arthropoda
- Subphylum: Chelicerata
- Class: Arachnida
- Order: Araneae
- Infraorder: Araneomorphae
- Family: Agelenidae
- Genus: Tikaderia
- Species: T. psechrina

Binomial name
- Tikaderia psechrina Lehtinen, 1967

Genus of spiders

Tikaderia is a genus of funnel weavers containing the single species, Tikaderia psechrina. It was first described by Pekka T. Lehtinen in 1967, and has only been found in .
