= Lineacoelotes =

Scientific classification
- Kingdom: Animalia
- Phylum: Arthropoda
- Subphylum: Chelicerata
- Class: Arachnida
- Order: Araneae
- Infraorder: Araneomorphae
- Family: Agelenidae
- Genus: Lineacoelotes; Xu, Li & Wang, 2008

Type species
- L. longicephalus Xu, Li & Wang, 2008

Species
- 9, see text

Genus of spiders

Lineacoelotes is a genus of East Asian funnel weavers first described by X. Xu, S. Q. Li & X. P. Wang in 2008.

== Species ==
As of October 2026 it contains nine species, all from China:

- Lineacoelotes bicultratus (Chen, Zhao & Wang, 1991) – China
- Lineacoelotes funiushanensis (Hu, Wang & Wang, 1991) – China
- Lineacoelotes lifengyuanae Zhao & S. Q. Li, 2019 – China
- Lineacoelotes longicephalus Xu, Li & Wang, 2008 – China
- Lineacoelotes nitidus (Li & Zhang, 2002) – China
- Lineacoelotes strenuus Xu, Li & Wang, 2008 – China
- Lineacoelotes tiantaiensis Zhao & S. Q. Li, 2019 – China
- Lineacoelotes zhongbaensis Zhao & S. Q. Li, 2019 – China
- Lineacoelotes ziboensis Zhao & S. Q. Li, 2019 – China
