= Vappolotes =

Scientific classification
- Kingdom: Animalia
- Phylum: Arthropoda
- Subphylum: Chelicerata
- Class: Arachnida
- Order: Araneae
- Infraorder: Araneomorphae
- Family: Agelenidae
- Genus: Vappolotes; Zhao & S. Q. Li, 2019

Type species
- V. ganlongensis Zhao & S. Q. Li, 2019

Species
- 5, see text

Genus of spiders

Vappolotes is a small genus of east Asian funnel weavers. It was first described by B. Li, Z. Zhao and Y. X. Chen in 2019, and it has only been found in China.

== Species ==
As of October 2026, it contains five species:

- Vappolotes ganlongensis Zhao & S. Q. Li, 2019 (type) — China
- Vappolotes hei B. Li, Zhao & S. Q. Li, 2023 — China
- Vappolotes jianpingensis Zhao & S. Q. Li, 2019 — China
- Vappolotes longshan B. Li, Zhao & S. Q. Li, 2023 — China
- Vappolotes tianjiayu B. Li, Zhao & S. Q. Li, 2023 — China
