= Hadites =

Scientific classification
- Kingdom: Animalia
- Phylum: Arthropoda
- Subphylum: Chelicerata
- Class: Arachnida
- Order: Araneae
- Infraorder: Araneomorphae
- Family: Agelenidae
- Genus: Hadites; Keyserling, 1862
- Species: H. tegenarioides

Binomial name
- Hadites tegenarioides Keyserling, 1862

Genus of spiders

Hadites is a genus of European funnel weavers containing the single species, Hadites tegenarioides. It was first described by Eugen von Keyserling in 1862, and has only been found in Croatia.
