= Nesiocoelotes =

Scientific classification
- Kingdom: Animalia
- Phylum: Arthropoda
- Subphylum: Chelicerata
- Class: Arachnida
- Order: Araneae
- Infraorder: Araneomorphae
- Family: Agelenidae
- Subfamily: Coelotinae
- Genus: Nesiocoelotes; Okumura & Zhao, 2022

Type species
- Coelotes insulanus Shimojana, 2000

Species
- 5, see text

Genus of spiders

Nesiocoelotes is a genus of spiders in the family Agelenidae.

== Distribution ==
The genus Nesiocoelotes is endemic to Japan, with all five species occurring on the Japanese islands including the Ryukyu archipelago.

== Etymology ==
The genus name is a combination of Ancient Greek nisiotikós "island" (referring to its distribution on Japanese islands) and related genus Coelotes.

== Species ==
As of October 2026, this genus includes five species:

- Nesiocoelotes gotoensis (Okumura, 2007) – Japan
- Nesiocoelotes insulanus (Shimojana, 2000) – Japan (Ryukyu Islands)
- Nesiocoelotes koshikiensis (Okumura, 2013) – Japan
- Nesiocoelotes nasensis (Shimojana, 2000) – Japan (Ryukyu Islands)
- Nesiocoelotes osamui (Nishikawa, 2009) – Japan
