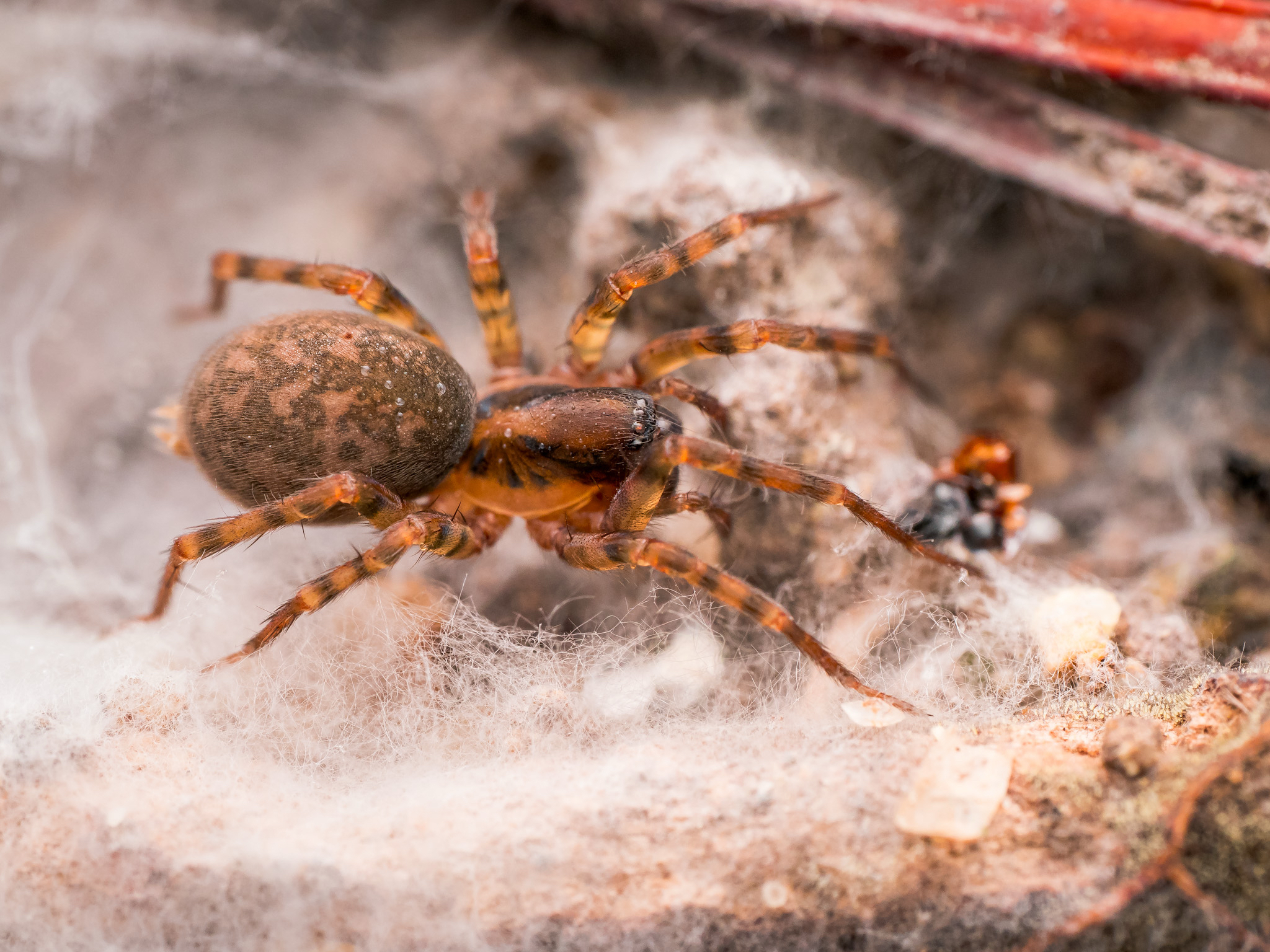
- female B. primus in Hong Kong
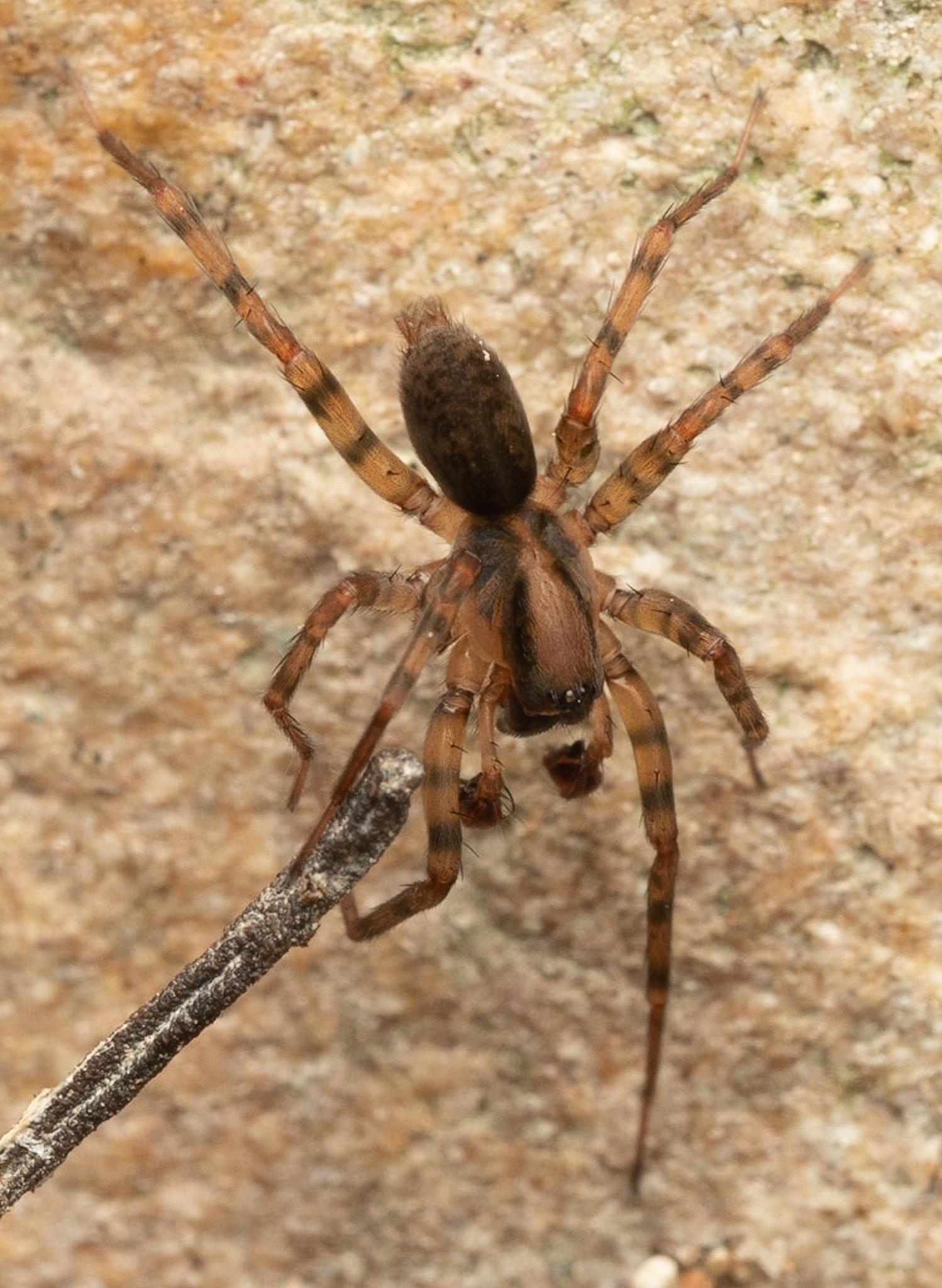
- male B. primus in Hong Kong

Scientific classification
- Kingdom: Animalia
- Phylum: Arthropoda
- Subphylum: Chelicerata
- Class: Arachnida
- Order: Araneae
- Infraorder: Araneomorphae
- Family: Agelenidae
- Genus: Bifidocoelotes; Wang, 2002

Type species
- Bifidocoelotes tsoi Li & Blick, 2020

Species
- 8, see text

= Bifidocoelotes =

Genus of spiders

Bifidocoelotes is a genus of East Asian funnel weavers first described by X. P. Wang in 2002.

== Species ==
As of October 2026 it contains eight species:

- Bifidocoelotes alviolatus Liu, Xu, Wang & Yin, 2024 — China
- Bifidocoelotes elongatus Liao, Wang, Yin & Xu, 2022 — China
- Bifidocoelotes latus Liu, Xu, Wang & Yin, 2024 — China
- Bifidocoelotes mammiformis Liao, Wang, Yin & Xu, 2022 — China
- Bifidocoelotes obscurus Zhou, Yuen & Zhang, 2017 — Hong Kong
- Bifidocoelotes primus (Fox, 1937) — Hong Kong
- Bifidocoelotes quadratus Liao, Wang, Yin & Xu, 2022 — China
- Bifidocoelotes tsoi Li & Blick, 2020 (type) — Taiwan
