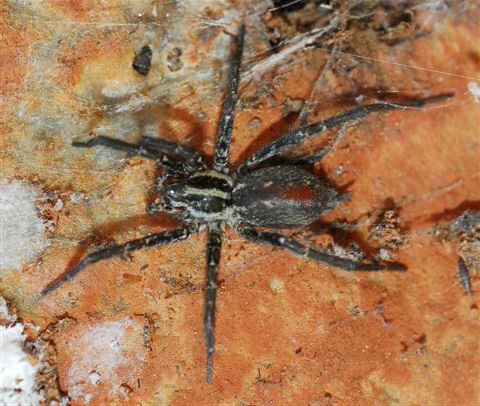
- Female
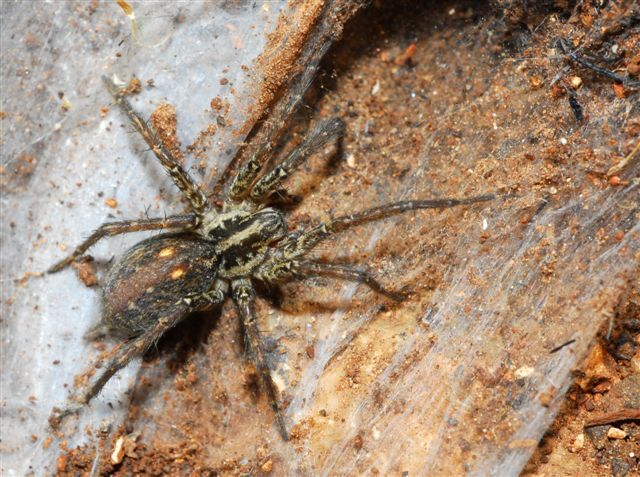
- Female

Scientific classification
- Kingdom: Animalia
- Phylum: Arthropoda
- Subphylum: Chelicerata
- Class: Arachnida
- Order: Araneae
- Infraorder: Araneomorphae
- Family: Agelenidae
- Genus: Olorunia
- Species: O. punctata

Binomial name
- Olorunia punctata Lehtinen, 1967

= Olorunia =

Species of funnel-web spider

Olorunia punctata is a species of funnel-web spider in the family Agelenidae. It is endemic to southern and central Africa, where it is commonly known as Lehtinen's funnel-web spider.

The genus Olorunia as a whole is known only from male specimens of one species.

== Etymology ==
The etymology of the specific name punctata derives from the Latin word meaning "spotted" or "dotted", likely referring to the distinctive spotted pattern on the spider's opisthosoma.

== Taxonomy ==
The species was first described by Pekka T. Lehtinen in 1967 based on a male holotype collected from Costermansville (now Bukavu), Democratic Republic of the Congo. The species is the type species of the monotypic genus Olorunia, meaning it is currently the only known species in the genus.

The genus Olorunia was established by Lehtinen in 1967 and is classified within the family Agelenidae. One species, Olorunia ocellata (Pocock, 1900), was later transferred to the genus Benoitia, leaving O. punctata as the sole representative of the genus.

== Distribution and habitat ==
Olorunia punctata has been recorded from Botswana, the Democratic Republic of the Congo, and South Africa. In South Africa, the species has a wide distribution across six provinces, including the Eastern Cape, Gauteng, KwaZulu-Natal, Limpopo, Northern Cape, and Western Cape.

== Habitat ==
The spider inhabits multiple biomes including Grassland, Nama Karoo, Savanna, and Thicket biomes, where it builds its webs in low vegetation close to the soil surface. It has been recorded from seven protected areas in South Africa.

The species occurs at elevations ranging from 48 to 1,752 metres above sea level.

== Description ==
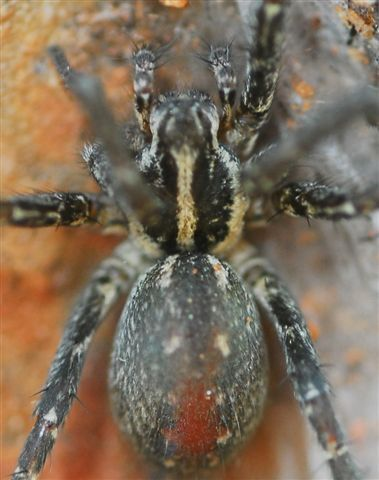
closeup of female

Olorunia punctata is a medium-sized funnel-web spider with a total length of 9–10 millimetres. The carapace has a similar shape to related species in the genus Textrix but with distinctive coloration differences.

The cephalic area is centrally light-coloured, and the dark marginal stripe is much less distinct than in related genera. The ocular area forms a protruding snout that is more prominent than in Textrix and related genera.

The chelicerae are long and conical with an oblique cheliceral margin. The anterior margin of the cheliceral groove has three true teeth and two additional, more distal, minute tubercles, while the posterior margin has four teeth that increase in size towards the base of the chelicerae. The fangs are long and moderately curved.

The opisthosoma is narrow and oval-shaped with distinctive markings. There is a well-defined, lancet-shaped, brown anterior folium and two rows of dark lateral patches along the caudal half of the dorsal side. The ventral side of the opisthosoma is light brown. The anterior spinnerets are cylindrical and spaced as wide apart as the length of the basal segment of the posterior spinnerets, though they are considerably longer and suffused with dark brown pigment both ventrally and dorsally. The apical segment of the posterior spinnerets is longer than the basal segment, slender and light in color.

The legs are long and slender with dark femoral bases and indistinct annulations on the remaining segments. The trichobothria are short and mainly rather indistinct.

== Ecology and behaviour ==
Olorunia punctata is a web-dwelling spider that constructs characteristic funnel-webs in grass and low vegetation close to the soil surface. These webs are typical of the Agelenidae family, consisting of a sheet web with a funnel-shaped retreat where the spider waits for prey.

== Conservation status ==
In South Africa, Olorunia punctata is classified as Least Concern due to its wide range and the absence of known threats. It is protected in seven protected areas, including Blouberg Nature Reserve, Lhuvhondo Nature Reserve, and Polokwane Nature Reserve.
