= Curticoelotes =

Scientific classification
- Kingdom: Animalia
- Phylum: Arthropoda
- Subphylum: Chelicerata
- Class: Arachnida
- Order: Araneae
- Infraorder: Araneomorphae
- Family: Agelenidae
- Genus: Curticoelotes; Okumura, 2020

Type species
- C. hiradoensis (Okumura & Ono, 2006)

Species
- 6, see text

Genus of spiders

Curticoelotes is a genus of east Asian funnel weavers. It was first described by K. Okumura in 2020, and it has only been found in Japan.

== Species ==
As of October 2026 it contains six species:

- C. hamamurai (Yaginuma, 1967) – Japan
- C. hiradoensis (Okumura & Ono, 2006) – Japan
- C. kintaroi (Nishikawa, 1983) – Japan
- C. oxyacanthus (Okumura, 2013) – Japan
- C. sawadai (Nishikawa, 2009) – Japan
- C. taurus (Nishikawa, 2009) – Japan
