= Sinocoelotes =

Scientific classification
- Kingdom: Animalia
- Phylum: Arthropoda
- Subphylum: Chelicerata
- Class: Arachnida
- Order: Araneae
- Infraorder: Araneomorphae
- Family: Agelenidae
- Genus: Sinocoelotes; Zhao & Li, 2016

Type species
- Sinocoelotes hehuaensis

Species
- 15, see text

Genus of spiders

Sinocoelotes is a genus of spiders in the family Agelenidae. It was first described in 2016 by Zhao & Li. As of 2017, it contains 15 species from China and Thailand.

== Species ==
Sinocoelotes comprises the following species:

- Sinocoelotes acicularis (Wang, Griswold & Ubick, 2009)
- Sinocoelotes cangshanensis Zhao & Li, 2016
- Sinocoelotes forficatus (Liu & Li, 2010)
- Sinocoelotes guangxian (Zhang, Yang, Zhu & Song, 2003)
- Sinocoelotes hehuaensis Zhao & Li, 2016
- Sinocoelotes kangdingensis Zhao & Li, 2016
- Sinocoelotes ludingensis Zhao & Li, 2016
- Sinocoelotes luoshuiensis Zhao & Li, 2016
- Sinocoelotes mahuanggouensis Zhao & Li, 2016
- Sinocoelotes mangbangensis Zhao & Li, 2016
- Sinocoelotes muliensis Zhao & Li, 2016
- Sinocoelotes pseudoterrestris (Schenkel, 1963)
- Sinocoelotes pseudoyunnanensis (Wang, Griswold & Ubick, 2009)
- Sinocoelotes thailandensis (Dankittipakul & Wang, 2003)
- Sinocoelotes yanyuanensis Zhao & Li, 2016
