= Femoracoelotes =

Scientific classification
- Kingdom: Animalia
- Phylum: Arthropoda
- Subphylum: Chelicerata
- Class: Arachnida
- Order: Araneae
- Infraorder: Araneomorphae
- Family: Agelenidae
- Genus: Femoracoelotes; Wang, 2002

Type species
- Coelotes platnicki Wang & Ono, 1998

Species
- F. latus (Wang, Tso & Wu, 2001) – Taiwan; F. platnicki (Wang & Ono, 1998) – Taiwan

Genus of spiders

Femoracoelotes is a genus of East Asian funnel weavers first described by X. P. Wang in 2002. As of October 2026 it contains only two species and is endemic to Taiwan.
