= Lagunella =

Scientific classification
- Domain: Eukaryota
- Kingdom: Animalia
- Phylum: Arthropoda
- Subphylum: Chelicerata
- Class: Arachnida
- Order: Araneae
- Infraorder: Araneomorphae
- Family: Agelenidae
- Genus: Lagunella; Maya-Morales & Jiménez, 2017
- Species: L. guaycura

Binomial name
- Lagunella guaycura Maya-Morales & Jiménez, 2017

Genus of spiders

Lagunella is a genus of funnel weavers containing the single species, Lagunella guaycura. It was first described by J. Maya-Morales, M. L. Jiménez, G. Murugan & C. Palacios-Cardiel in 2017, and is only found in Mexico.
