= Neowadotes =

Scientific classification
- Domain: Eukaryota
- Kingdom: Animalia
- Phylum: Arthropoda
- Subphylum: Chelicerata
- Class: Arachnida
- Order: Araneae
- Infraorder: Araneomorphae
- Family: Agelenidae
- Genus: Neowadotes
- Species: N. casabito

Binomial name
- Neowadotes casabito Alayón, 1995

Genus of spiders

Neowadotes is a genus of Caribbean funnel weavers containing the single species, Neowadotes casabito. It was first described by G. Alayón G. in 1995, and has only been found in Hispaniola.
