= Neotegenaria =

Scientific classification
- Domain: Eukaryota
- Kingdom: Animalia
- Phylum: Arthropoda
- Subphylum: Chelicerata
- Class: Arachnida
- Order: Araneae
- Infraorder: Araneomorphae
- Family: Agelenidae
- Genus: Neotegenaria
- Species: N. agelenoides

Binomial name
- Neotegenaria agelenoides Roth, 1967

Genus of spiders

Neotegenaria is a genus of South American funnel weavers containing the single species, Neotegenaria agelenoides. It was first described by V. D. Roth in 1967, and has only been found in Guyana.
