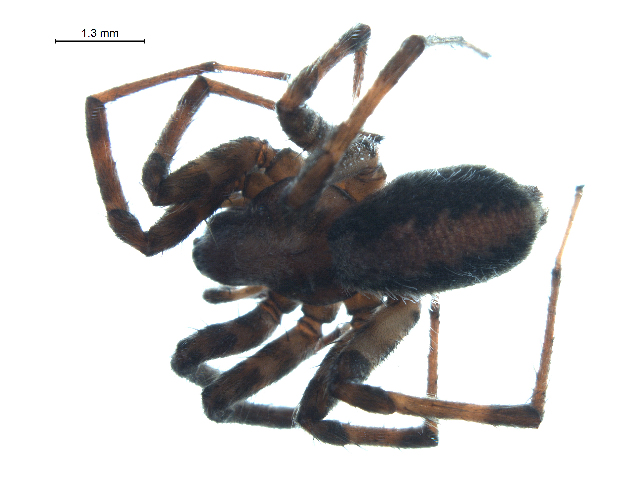
- N. intermedia

Scientific classification
- Kingdom: Animalia
- Phylum: Arthropoda
- Subphylum: Chelicerata
- Class: Arachnida
- Order: Araneae
- Infraorder: Araneomorphae
- Family: Agelenidae
- Genus: Novalena; Chamberlin & Ivie, 1942

Type species
- N. intermedia (Chamberlin & Gertsch, 1930)

Species
- 53, see text

= Novalena =

Genus of spiders

Novalena is a genus of North American and Caribbean funnel weavers first described by R. V. Chamberlin & Wilton Ivie in 1942.

== Species ==
As of October 2026 it contains fifty-three species:

- N. ajusco Maya-Morales & Jiménez, 2017 – Mexico
- N. alamo Maya-Morales & Jiménez, 2017 – Mexico
- N. alvarezi Maya-Morales & Jiménez, 2017 – Mexico
- N. annamae (Gertsch & Davis, 1940) – Mexico
- N. approximata (Gertsch & Ivie, 1936) – Mexico, Costa Rica
- N. attenuata (F. O. Pickard-Cambridge, 1902) – Mexico, Guatemala
- N. atzimbo Maya-Morales & Jiménez, 2017 – Mexico
- N. bipartita (Kraus, 1955) – El Salvador
- N. bipunctata Roth, 1967 – Mexico, Trinidad
- N. bosencheve Maya-Morales & Jiménez, 2017 – Mexico
- N. calavera Chamberlin & Ivie, 1942 – USA
- N. chamberlini Maya-Morales & Jiménez, 2017 – Mexico
- N. cieneguilla Maya-Morales & Jiménez, 2017 – Mexico
- N. cintalapa Maya-Morales & Jiménez, 2017 – Mexico
- N. clara Maya-Morales & Jiménez, 2017 – Mexico
- N. comaltepec Maya-Morales & Jiménez, 2017 – Mexico
- N. costata (F. O. Pickard-Cambridge, 1902) – Costa Rica
- N. creel Maya-Morales & Jiménez, 2017 – Mexico
- N. dentata Maya-Morales & Jiménez, 2017 – Mexico
- N. divisadero Maya-Morales & Jiménez, 2017 – Mexico
- N. durango Maya-Morales & Jiménez, 2017 – Mexico
- N. franckei Maya-Morales & Jiménez, 2017 – Mexico
- N. garnica Maya-Morales & Jiménez, 2017 – Mexico
- N. gibarrai Maya-Morales & Jiménez, 2017 – Mexico
- N. intermedia (Chamberlin & Gertsch, 1930) – Canada, USA
- N. irazu Maya-Morales & Jiménez, 2017 – Costa Rica
- N. iviei Maya-Morales & Jiménez, 2017 – Mexico
- N. ixtlan Maya-Morales & Jiménez, 2017 – Mexico
- N. jiquilpan Maya-Morales & Jiménez, 2017 – Mexico
- N. laticava (Kraus, 1955) – El Salvador
- N. leonensis Maya-Morales & Jiménez, 2017 – Mexico
- N. lutzi (Gertsch, 1933) – USA
- N. mexiquensis Maya-Morales & Jiménez, 2017 – Mexico
- N. oaxaca Maya-Morales & Jiménez, 2017 – Mexico
- N. orizaba (Banks, 1898) – Mexico
- N. paricutin Maya-Morales & Jiménez, 2017 – Mexico
- N. perote Maya-Morales & Jiménez, 2017 – Mexico
- N. plata Maya-Morales & Jiménez, 2017 – USA
- N. poncei Maya-Morales & Jiménez, 2017 – Mexico
- N. popoca Maya-Morales & Jiménez, 2017 – Mexico
- N. prieta Maya-Morales & Jiménez, 2017 – Mexico
- N. puebla Maya-Morales & Jiménez, 2017 – Mexico
- N. punta Maya-Morales & Jiménez, 2017 – Mexico
- N. rothi Maya-Morales & Jiménez, 2017 – USA
- N. saltoensis Maya-Morales & Jiménez, 2017 – Mexico
- N. shlomitae (García-Villafuerte, 2009) – Mexico
- N. simplex (F. O. Pickard-Cambridge, 1902) – Mexico, Guatemala
- N. sinaloa Maya-Morales & Jiménez, 2017 – Mexico
- N. tacana Maya-Morales & Jiménez, 2017 – Mexico, Guatemala
- N. triunfo Maya-Morales & Jiménez, 2017 – Mexico
- N. valdezi Maya-Morales & Jiménez, 2017 – Mexico
- N. victoria Maya-Morales & Jiménez, 2017 – Mexico
- N. volcanes Maya-Morales & Jiménez, 2017 – Mexico
