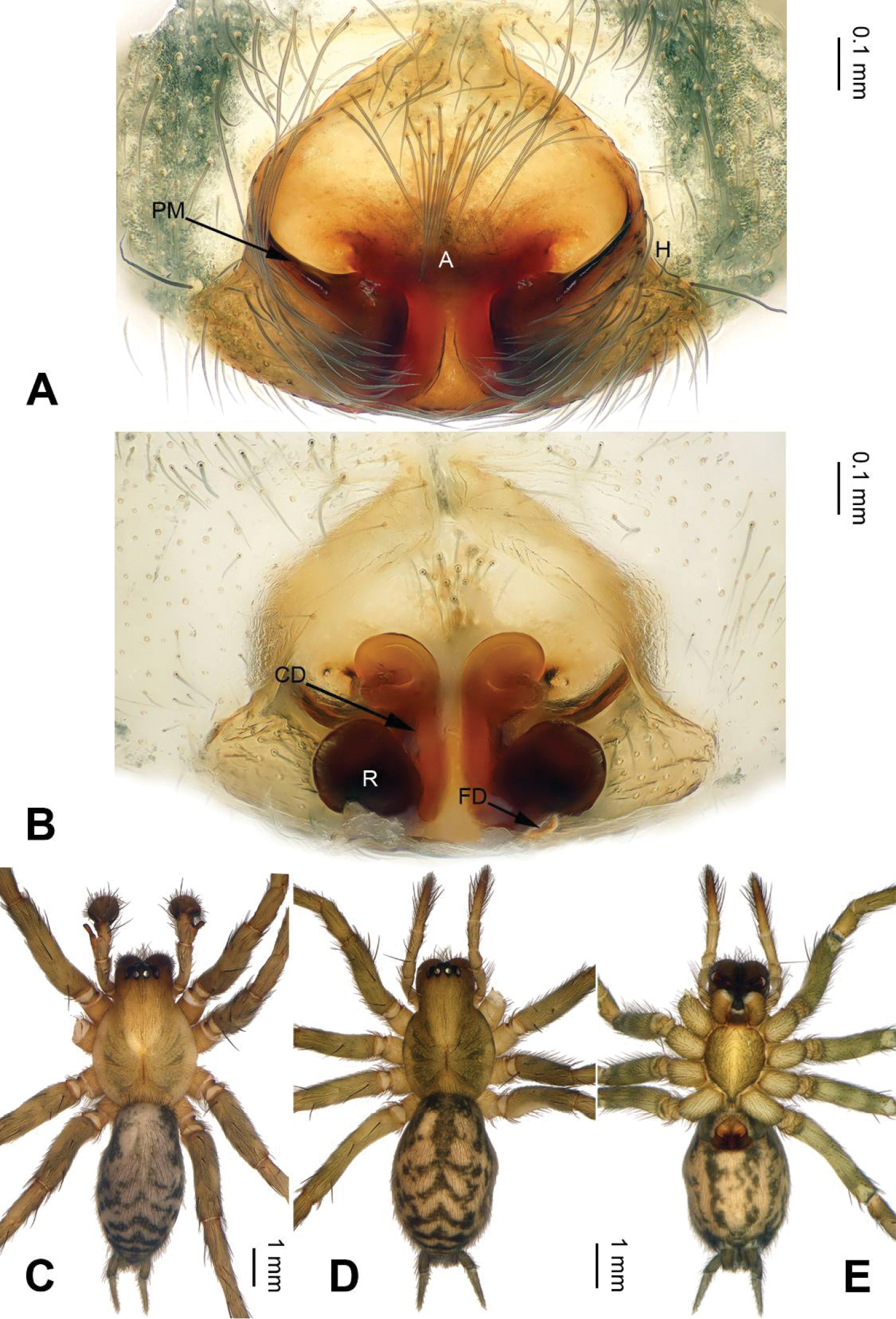
- Longicoelotes kulianganus

Scientific classification
- Kingdom: Animalia
- Phylum: Arthropoda
- Subphylum: Chelicerata
- Class: Arachnida
- Order: Araneae
- Infraorder: Araneomorphae
- Family: Agelenidae
- Genus: Longicoelotes; Wang, 2002

Type species
- L. karschi Wang, 2002

Species
- 4, see text

= Longicoelotes =

Genus of spiders

Longicoelotes is a genus of East Asian funnel weavers first described by X. P. Wang in 2002.

== Species ==
As of October 2026 it contains four species:

- Longicoelotes geei Zhang & Zhao, 2017 – China
- Longicoelotes karschi Wang, 2002 – China
- Longicoelotes kulianganus (Chamberlin, 1924) – China
- Longicoelotes senkakuensis (Shimojana, 2000) – Japan (Ryukyu Is.)
