= Rothilena =

Scientific classification
- Kingdom: Animalia
- Phylum: Arthropoda
- Subphylum: Chelicerata
- Class: Arachnida
- Order: Araneae
- Infraorder: Araneomorphae
- Family: Agelenidae
- Genus: Rothilena; Maya-Morales & Jiménez, 2013

Type species
- R. griswoldi Maya-Morales & Jiménez, 2013

Species
- 6, see text

Genus of spiders

Rothilena is a genus of North American funnel weavers first described by J. Maya-Morales & M. L. Jiménez in 2013.

== Species ==
As of October 2026 it contains six species, all found in Mexico:

- Rothilena cochimi Maya-Morales & Jiménez, 2013 – Mexico
- Rothilena golondrina Maya-Morales & Jiménez, 2013 – Mexico
- Rothilena griswoldi Maya-Morales & Jiménez, 2013 – Mexico
- Rothilena naranjensis Maya-Morales & Jiménez, 2013 – Mexico
- Rothilena pilar Maya-Morales & Jiménez, 2013 – Mexico
- Rothilena sudcaliforniensis Maya-Morales & Jiménez, 2013 – Mexico
