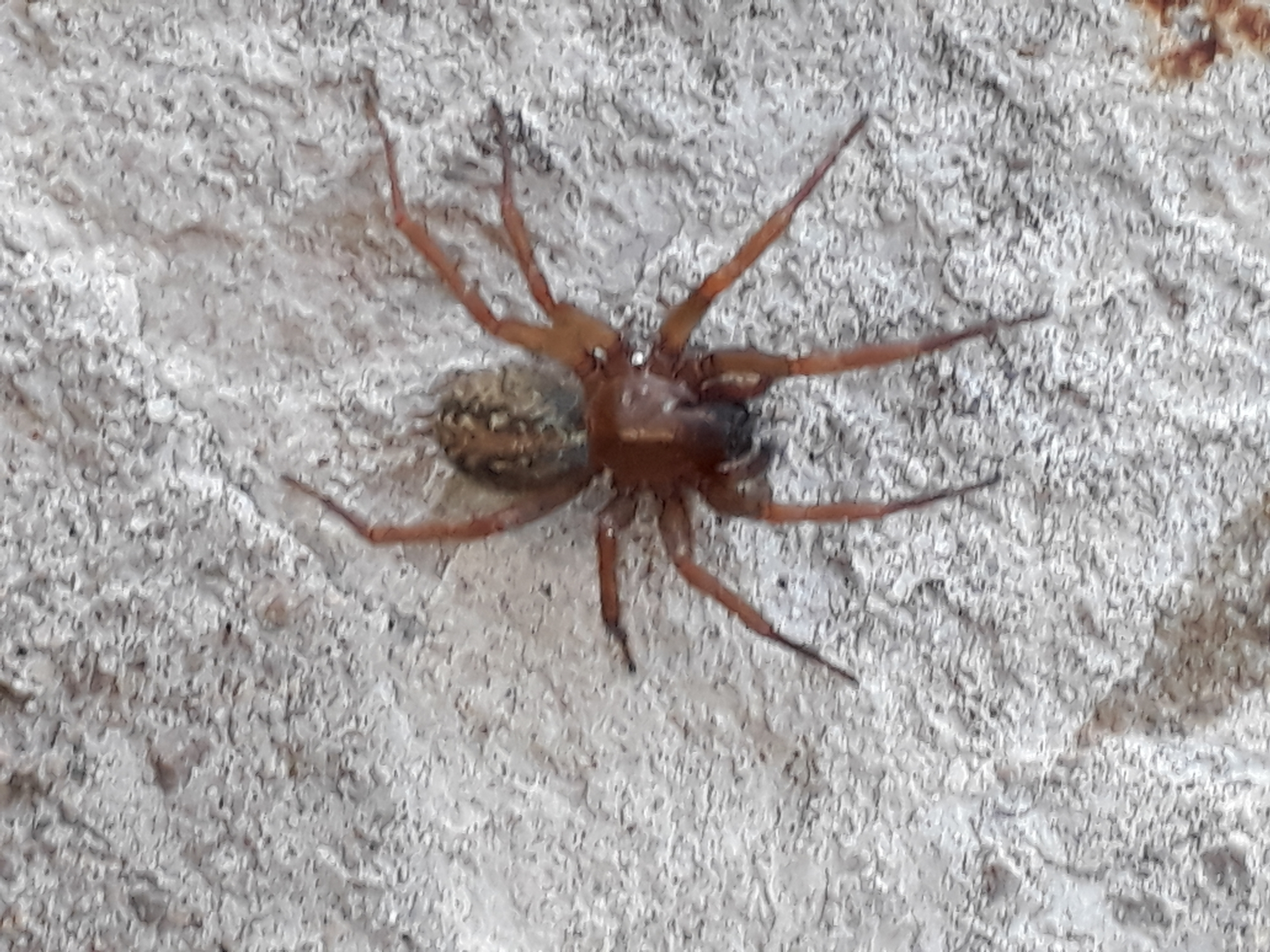
- Lycosoides coarctata

Scientific classification
- Kingdom: Animalia
- Phylum: Arthropoda
- Subphylum: Chelicerata
- Class: Arachnida
- Order: Araneae
- Infraorder: Araneomorphae
- Family: Agelenidae
- Genus: Lycosoides; Lucas, 1846

Type species
- L. flavomaculata Lucas, 1846

Species
- 14, see text

= Lycosoides =

Genus of spiders

Lycosoides is a genus of Mediterranean funnel weavers first described by Hippolyte Lucas in 1846.

== Species ==
As of October 2026 it contains fourteen species:

- Lycosoides caparti (de Blauwe, 1980) – Morocco, Algeria, Tunisia
- Lycosoides coarctata (Dufour, 1831) – Canary Is., Mediterranean
- Lycosoides crassivulva (Denis, 1954) – Morocco
- Lycosoides flavomaculata Lucas, 1846 – Mediterranean
- Lycosoides incisofemoralis Bosmans, 2022 – Algeria
- Lycosoides instabilis (Denis, 1954) – Morocco, Algeria
- Lycosoides kabyliana Bosmans, 2022 – Algeria
- Lycosoides lehtineni Marusik & Guseinov, 2003 – Azerbaijan
- Lycosoides leprieuri (Simon, 1875) – Algeria, Tunisia
- Lycosoides murphyorum Bosmans, 2022 – Morocco
- Lycosoides parva (Denis, 1954) – Morocco
- Lycosoides robertsi Bosmans, 2022 – Tunisia
- Lycosoides saiss Bosmans, 2022 – Morocco
- Lycosoides variegata (Simon, 1870) – Spain, Gibraltar, Morocco, Algeria
