= Cabolena =

Scientific classification
- Kingdom: Animalia
- Phylum: Arthropoda
- Subphylum: Chelicerata
- Class: Arachnida
- Order: Araneae
- Infraorder: Araneomorphae
- Family: Agelenidae
- Genus: Cabolena; Maya-Morales & Jiménez, 2017

Type species
- C. kosatli Maya-Morales, Jiménez & Palacios-Cardiel, 2017

Species
- C. huiztocatl Maya-Morales & Jiménez, 2017 — Mexico; C. kosatli Maya-Morales, Jiménez & Palacios-Cardiel, 2017 — Mexico; C. sotol Maya-Morales, Jiménez & Palacios-Cardiel, 2017 — Mexico

Genus of spiders

Cabolena is a genus of funnel weavers (spiders) first described by J. Maya-Morales and M. L. Jiménez in 2017. As of October 2026 it contains only three species.
