= Flexicoelotes =

Scientific classification
- Kingdom: Animalia
- Phylum: Arthropoda
- Subphylum: Chelicerata
- Class: Arachnida
- Order: Araneae
- Infraorder: Araneomorphae
- Family: Agelenidae
- Genus: Flexicoelotes; Chen, Li & Zhao, 2015

Species
- Flexicoelotes huyunensis Chen & Li, 2015; Flexicoelotes jiaohanyanensis Chen & Li, 2015; Flexicoelotes jinlongyanensis Chen & Li, 2015; Flexicoelotes pingzhaiensis Chen & Li, 2015; Flexicoelotes xingwangensis Chen & Li, 2015

Genus of spiders

Flexicoelotes is a genus of spiders in the family Agelenidae. It was first described in 2015 by Chen, Li and Zhao. As of October 2026 it contains 5 species, all found in China.
