= Tortolena =

Scientific classification
- Kingdom: Animalia
- Phylum: Arthropoda
- Subphylum: Chelicerata
- Class: Arachnida
- Order: Araneae
- Infraorder: Araneomorphae
- Family: Agelenidae
- Genus: Tortolena; Chamberlin & Ivie, 1941

Type species
- T. glaucopis (F. O. Pickard-Cambridge, 1902)

Species
- T. dela Chamberlin & Ivie, 1941 – USA; T. glaucopis (F. O. Pickard-Cambridge, 1902) – Mexico, Costa Rica

Genus of spiders

Tortolena is a genus of North American and Central American funnel weavers first described by R. V. Chamberlin & Wilton Ivie in 1941. As of October 2026 it contains only two species.
