= Huangyuania =

Scientific classification
- Kingdom: Animalia
- Phylum: Arthropoda
- Subphylum: Chelicerata
- Class: Arachnida
- Order: Araneae
- Infraorder: Araneomorphae
- Family: Agelenidae
- Genus: Huangyuania
- Species: H. tibetana

Binomial name
- Huangyuania tibetana Song & Li, 1990

Genus of spiders

Huangyuania is a genus of East Asian funnel weavers containing the single species, Huangyuania tibetana. It was first described by D. X. Song & Z. S. Li in 1990, and has only been found in China.
