= Marusik (spider) =

Scientific classification
- Kingdom: Animalia
- Phylum: Arthropoda
- Subphylum: Chelicerata
- Class: Arachnida
- Order: Araneae
- Infraorder: Araneomorphae
- Family: Gnaphosidae
- Genus: Marusik; Lin & Li, 2023
- Species: M. yurii

Binomial name
- Marusik yurii Lin & Li, 2023

Species of spider

Marusik is a monotypic genus of spiders in the family Gnaphosidae containing the single species, Marusik yurii. Only the male has been described.

It is named after Russian arachnologist Yuri M. Marusik (born 1962).

== Distribution ==
Marusik yurii is only known from several males from the type locality in Cúc Phương National Park, Vietnam.

== Description ==
Body length is around 2.5-3 mm. The males of this species can be distinguished from related ones in the Haplodrassus group by having six eyes.
