= Himalcoelotes =

Scientific classification
- Kingdom: Animalia
- Phylum: Arthropoda
- Subphylum: Chelicerata
- Class: Arachnida
- Order: Araneae
- Infraorder: Araneomorphae
- Family: Agelenidae
- Genus: Himalcoelotes; Wang, 2002

Type species
- H. martensi Wang, 2002

Species
- 13, see text

Genus of spiders

Himalcoelotes is a genus of Asian funnel weavers first described by X. P. Wang in 2002. They are endemic to China and Nepal.

== Species ==
As of October 2026 it contains thirteen species:

- Himalcoelotes aequoreus Wang, 2002 – Nepal
- Himalcoelotes brignolii Wang, 2002 – Bhutan
- Himalcoelotes bursarius Wang, 2002 – Nepal
- Himalcoelotes diatropos Wang, 2002 – Nepal
- Himalcoelotes gyirongensis (Hu & Li, 1987) – China, Nepal
- Himalcoelotes martensi Wang, 2002 – Nepal
- Himalcoelotes pirum Wang, 2002 – Nepal
- Himalcoelotes sherpa (Brignoli, 1976) – Nepal
- Himalcoelotes subsherpa Wang, 2002 – Nepal
- Himalcoelotes syntomos Wang, 2002 – Nepal
- Himalcoelotes tortuous Zhang & Zhu, 2010 – China
- Himalcoelotes xizangensis (Hu, 1992) – China
- Himalcoelotes zhamensis Zhang & Zhu, 2010 – China
