= Bajacalilena =

Scientific classification
- Kingdom: Animalia
- Phylum: Arthropoda
- Subphylum: Chelicerata
- Class: Arachnida
- Order: Araneae
- Infraorder: Araneomorphae
- Family: Agelenidae
- Genus: Bajacalilena; Maya-Morales & Jiménez, 2017

Type species
- B. clarki Maya-Morales & Jiménez, 2017

Species
- B. bolzerni Maya-Morales & Jiménez, 2017 — Mexico; B. clarki Maya-Morales & Jiménez, 2017 — Mexico

Genus of spiders

Bajacalilena is a genus of funnel weavers first described by J. Maya-Morales and M. L. Jiménez in 2017. As of October 2026 it contains only two species, both endemic to Mexico.
