= Tegecoelotes =

Scientific classification
- Kingdom: Animalia
- Phylum: Arthropoda
- Subphylum: Chelicerata
- Class: Arachnida
- Order: Araneae
- Infraorder: Araneomorphae
- Family: Agelenidae
- Genus: Tegecoelotes; Ovtchinnikov, 1999

Type species
- T. secundus (Paik, 1971)

Species
- 15, see text

Genus of spiders

Tegecoelotes is a genus of Asian funnel weavers first described by S. V. Ovtchinnikov in 1999.

== Species ==
As of October 2026 it contains fifteen species:

- Tegecoelotes chikunii Okumura, Ono & Nishikawa, 2011 – Japan
- Tegecoelotes corasides (Bösenberg & Strand, 1906) – Japan
- Tegecoelotes dorsatus (Uyemura, 1936) – Japan
- Tegecoelotes dysodentatus Zhang & Zhu, 2005 – China
- Tegecoelotes echigonis Nishikawa, 2009 – Japan
- Tegecoelotes eurydentatus Zhang, Zhu & Wang, 2017 – China
- Tegecoelotes hibaensis Okumura, Ono & Nishikawa, 2011 – Japan
- Tegecoelotes ignotus (Bösenberg & Strand, 1906) – Japan
- Tegecoelotes michikoae (Nishikawa, 1977) – Japan
- Tegecoelotes mizuyamae Ono, 2008 – Japan
- Tegecoelotes otomo Nishikawa, 2009 – Japan
- Tegecoelotes religiosus Nishikawa, 2009 – Japan
- Tegecoelotes secundus (Paik, 1971) – Russia (Far East), China, Korea, Japan
- Tegecoelotes tateyamaensis Nishikawa, 2009 – Japan
- Tegecoelotes yogoensis Nishikawa, 2009 – Japan
