= Hellamalthonica =

Scientific classification
- Kingdom: Animalia
- Phylum: Arthropoda
- Subphylum: Chelicerata
- Class: Arachnida
- Order: Araneae
- Infraorder: Araneomorphae
- Family: Agelenidae
- Genus: Hellamalthonica; Bosmans, 2023

Type species
- H. minoa (Brignoli, 1976)

Species
- 5, see text

Genus of spiders

Hellamalthonica is a genus of funnel weavers first described by R. Bosmans in 2023. It is endemic to Greece, and contains five species formerly placed in Malthonica.

== Species ==
As of October 2026 it contains five species:

- Hellamalthonica irini Bosmans, 2023 – Greece (Crete)
- Hellamalthonica minoa (Brignoli, 1976) – Greece (Crete)
- Hellamalthonica paraschiae (Brignoli, 1984) – Greece
- Hellamalthonica spinipalpis (Deltshev, 1990) – Greece
- Hellamalthonica taigetos Bosmans, 2023 – Greece
