= Tonsilla =

Scientific classification
- Kingdom: Animalia
- Phylum: Arthropoda
- Subphylum: Chelicerata
- Class: Arachnida
- Order: Araneae
- Infraorder: Araneomorphae
- Family: Agelenidae
- Genus: Tonsilla; Wang & Yin, 1992

Type species
- T. truculenta Wang & Yin, 1992

Species
- 19, see text

Genus of spiders

Tonsilla is a genus of East Asian funnel weavers first described by J. F. Wang & C. M. Yin in 1992.

== Species ==
As of October 2026 it contains nineteen species:

- Tonsilla defossa Xu & Li, 2006 — China
- Tonsilla distalis Zhang, Zhu & Wang, 2017 — China
- Tonsilla eburniformis Wang & Yin, 1992 — China
- Tonsilla jinggangensis Liu & Xu, 2020 — China
- Tonsilla jinyunensis M. Zhang, Irfan, Wang & Z. S. Zhang, 2022 — China
- Tonsilla jiugongensis M. Zhang, Irfan, Wang & Z. S. Zhang, 2022 — China
- Tonsilla lyrata (Wang, Yin, Peng & Xie, 1990) — China
- Tonsilla makros Wang, 2003 — China
- Tonsilla mopanensis Zhang, Zhu & Wang, 2017 — China
- Tonsilla rostrum Jiang, Chen & Zhang, 2018 — China
- Tonsilla rutunda M. Zhang, Irfan, Wang & Z. S. Zhang, 2022 — China
- Tonsilla shuikouensis K. Liu, J. Liu & Xu, 2021 — China
- Tonsilla subrostrum M. Zhang, Irfan, Wang & Z. S. Zhang, 2022 — China
- Tonsilla subtruculenta M. Zhang, Irfan, Wang & Z. S. Zhang, 2022 — China
- Tonsilla tautispina (Wang, Yin, Peng & Xie, 1990) — China
- Tonsilla truculenta Wang & Yin, 1992 — China
- Tonsilla variegata (Wang, Yin, Peng & Xie, 1990) — China
- Tonsilla yanlingensis (Zhang, Yin & Kim, 2000) — China
- Tonsilla yueliangensis M. Zhang, Irfan, Wang & Z. S. Zhang, 2022 — China
