= Orumcekia =

Scientific classification
- Kingdom: Animalia
- Phylum: Arthropoda
- Subphylum: Chelicerata
- Class: Arachnida
- Order: Araneae
- Infraorder: Araneomorphae
- Family: Agelenidae
- Genus: Orumcekia; Koçak & Kemal, 2008

Type species
- O. gemata (Wang, 1994)

Species
- 10, see text

Genus of spiders

Orumcekia is a genus of Asian funnel weavers spiders first described by A. Ö. Koçak & M. Kemal in 2008.

== Species ==
As of October 2026, this genus includes ten species:

- Orumcekia chongzhouensis L. Y. Wang, Y. C. Wang, Wu & Zhang, 2021 – China
- Orumcekia cipingensis K. Liu, J. Liu & Xu, 2021 – China
- Orumcekia gemata (Wang, 1994) – China, Vietnam (type species)
- Orumcekia jianhuii (Tang & Yin, 2002) – China
- Orumcekia lanna (Dankittipakul, Sonthichai & Wang, 2006) – Thailand, Vietnam
- Orumcekia libo (Wang, 2003) – China, Vietnam
- Orumcekia mangshan (Zhang & Yin, 2001) – China
- Orumcekia pseudogemata (Xu & Li, 2007) – China
- Orumcekia sigillata (Wang, 1994) – China
- Orumcekia subsigillata (Wang, 2003) – China
