= Hengconarius =

Scientific classification
- Kingdom: Animalia
- Phylum: Arthropoda
- Subphylum: Chelicerata
- Class: Arachnida
- Order: Araneae
- Infraorder: Araneomorphae
- Family: Agelenidae
- Genus: Hengconarius; Zhao & S. Q. Li, 2018

Type species
- H. exilis (Zhang, Zhu & Wang, 2005)

Species
- 8, see text

Genus of spiders

Hengconarius is a genus of funnel weavers first described by Zhao & S. Q. Li in 2018.

== Species ==
As of October 2026 it contains eight species:

- Hengconarius dedaensis Zhao & S. Q. Li, 2018 — China
- Hengconarius exilis (Zhang, Zhu & Wang, 2005) — China
- Hengconarius falcatus (Xu & Li, 2006) — China
- Hengconarius incertus (Wang, 2003) — China
- Hengconarius latusincertus (Wang, Griswold & Miller, 2010) — China
- Hengconarius longipalpus Zhao & S. Q. Li, 2018 — China
- Hengconarius longpuensis Zhao & S. Q. Li, 2018 — China
- Hengconarius pseudobrunneus (Wang, 2003) — China
