= Nuconarius =

Scientific classification
- Kingdom: Animalia
- Phylum: Arthropoda
- Subphylum: Chelicerata
- Class: Arachnida
- Order: Araneae
- Infraorder: Araneomorphae
- Family: Agelenidae
- Genus: Nuconarius; Zhao & S. Q. Li, 2018

Type species
- N. brevipatellatus Zhao & S. Q. Li, 2018

Species
- N. brevipatellatus Zhao & S. Q. Li, 2018 — China; N. capitulatus (Wang, 2003) — China; N. pseudocapitulatus (Wang, 2003) — China

Genus of spiders

Nuconarius is a genus of funnel weavers first described by Zhao & S. Q. Li in 2018. As of October 2026 it contains only three species.
