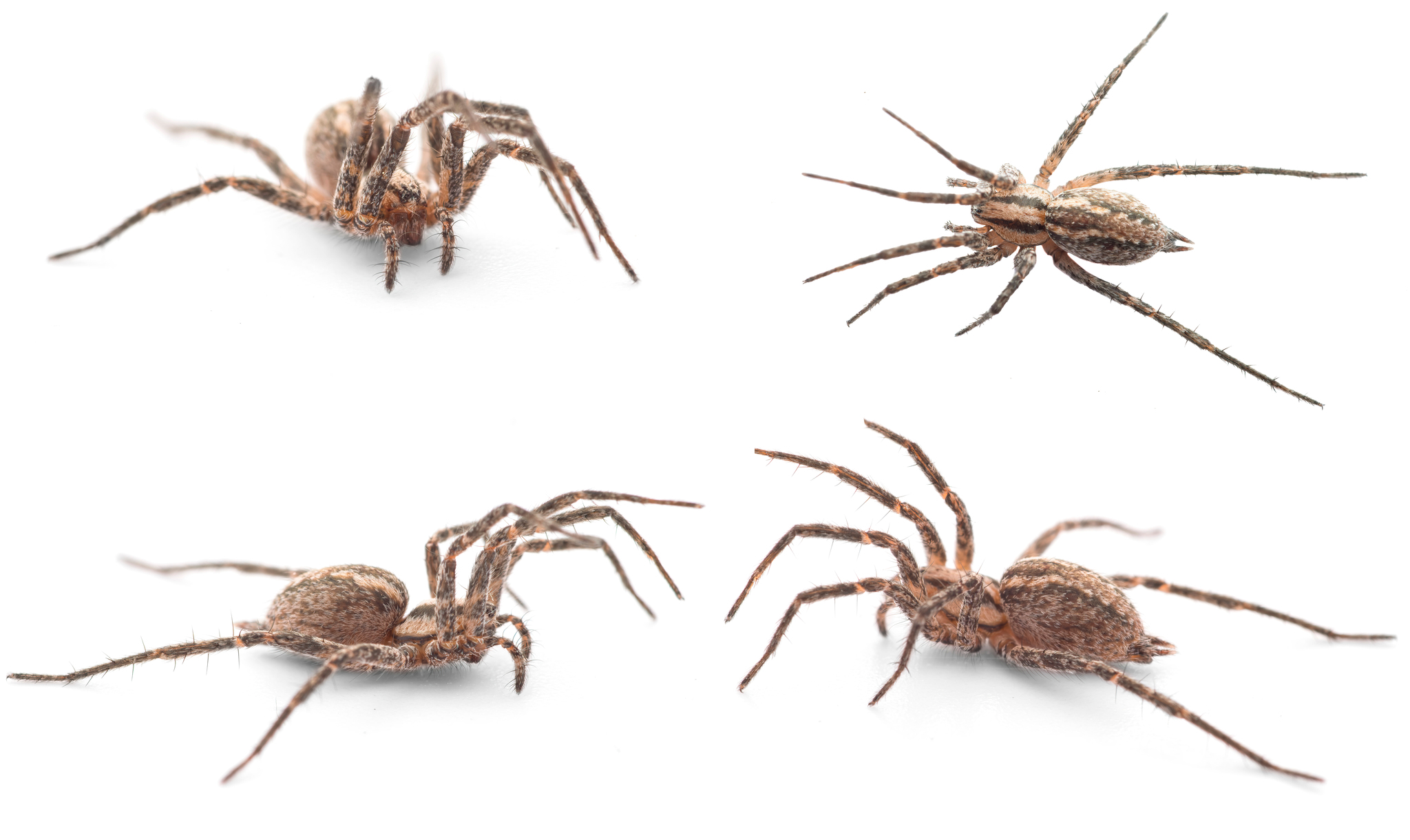
- juvenile A. livida in Spain
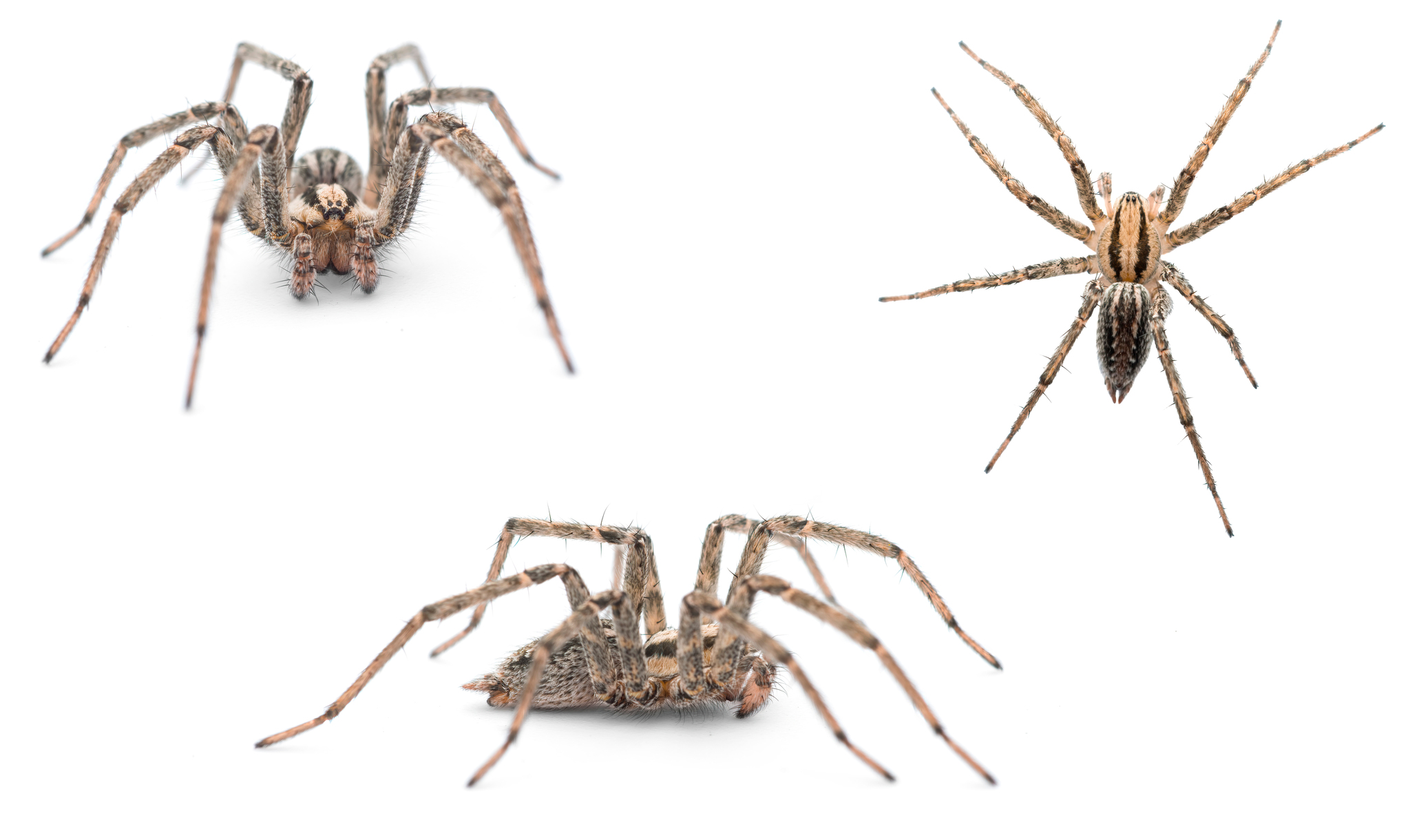
- A. livida in Spain

Scientific classification
- Kingdom: Animalia
- Phylum: Arthropoda
- Subphylum: Chelicerata
- Class: Arachnida
- Order: Araneae
- Infraorder: Araneomorphae
- Family: Agelenidae
- Genus: Agelescape; Levy, 1996

Type species
- A. livida (Simon, 1875)

Species
- 2, see text

= Agelescape =

Genus of spiders

Agelescape is a genus of funnel weavers first described by G. Levy in 1996.

== Species ==
As of October 2026, this genus includes two species:

- Agelescape affinis (Kulczyński, 1911) – Syria, Israel, Lebanon?
- Agelescape livida (Simon, 1875) – Spain, Algeria, Tunisia, Albania, Greece, Turkey
