= Alireza Zamani =

Iranian arachnologist (born 1994)

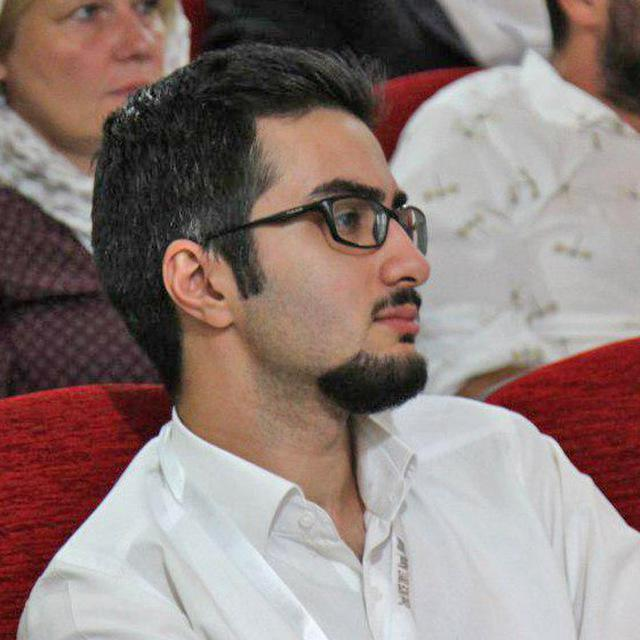
- Alireza Zamani at the 2nd Iranian International Congress of Entomology, September 2017
- Born: January 11, 1994 (age 32); Tehran, Iran
- Citizenship: Iran
- Education: University of Tehran (B.Sc., M.Sc.)
- Scientific career
- Fields: Arachnology
- Author abbrev. (zoology): Zamani

Alireza Zamani (born 11 January 1994) is an Iranian arachnologist and taxonomist.

== Life and career ==
Zamani has been interested in spiders since childhood, when he spent most of his time collecting and rearing different species that he could collect from the family garden. Influenced by his high school biology teacher, he decided to study animal biology at the University of Tehran in order to pursue his arachnological interests.

Zamani has co-recorded over 430 new taxa for the fauna of Iran, and has described over 150 new species of spiders, harvestmen, whip spiders and pseudoscorpions, more noticeably Filistata maguirei and Pritha garfieldi of the family Filistatidae, named after the former Spider-Man actors Tobey Maguire and Andrew Garfield, Lycosa aragogi of the family Lycosidae, named after Aragog, the fictional spider from the Harry Potter novel series by J. K. Rowling, Loureedia phoenixi of the family Eresidae, named after the actor Joaquin Phoenix, for a color pattern which resembles the movie character Joker from D.C. Comics, Scytodes kumonga of the family Scytodidae, named after the spider kaiju Kumonga, a recurring monster in the Godzilla franchise by Toho (Kumonga's scientific name in Godzilla Singular Point, Kumonga scytodes, pays homage to this species), and Loxosceles coheni of the family Sicariidae, named after the singer-songwriter, poet and novelist Leonard Cohen.

Zamani has authored The Field Guide of Spiders and Scorpions of Iran, which is the first field guide devoted to the arachnids of the Middle East, containing information on more than 230 species of both orders. He is the senior author of the catalog of Iranian spiders and the country coordinator of Iran in the World Spider Catalog project.

== Eponymous taxa ==
- Anthocharis gruneri zamanii Naderi & Back, 2019 (Lepidoptera: Pieridae)
- Tegenaria zamanii Marusik & Omelko, 2014 (Araneae: Agelenidae)

== Selected publications ==
=== Book ===
- Zamani, A. (2016): The Field Guide of Spiders and Scorpions of Iran. Iranshenasi, 360 pp. [in Persian] Publisher's webpage
