= Yuri M. Marusik =

Yuri Mikhailovich Marusik
- Юрий Михайлович Марусик
- Born: May 13, 1962 (age 64); Sarny, Ukraine
- Citizenship: Russia
- Education: Leningrad State University
- Scientific career
- Fields: Arachnology
- Author abbrev. (zoology): Marusik

Yuri Mikhailovich Marusik (Russian: Юрий Михайлович Марусик; born 13 May 1962) is a Russian arachnologist.

== Early life and education ==
Marusik was born in Sarny, a small town in West Ukraine, to Mikhail Adamovich, a school teacher, and Tamara Andreevna, a nurse. His interest in zoology started at an early age, from reading books about animals. Marusik started his studies at Leningrad (now Saint Petersburg) State University in 1979 where he specialized in entomology under the supervision of Victor P. Tyshchenko. After his graduation in 1984, Marusik was accepted into a Ph.D. program in Magadan, working in the lab of Daniil I. Berman. His Ph.D. dissertation (1988) was devoted to fauna, population structure and spatial distribution of spiders in the upper reaches of the Kolyma River, northeastern Siberia.

== Contributions to arachnology ==
Marusik has published over 500 scientific papers dealing with taxonomy, systematics, faunistics and the biogeography of spiders and other invertebrates. He has described two subfamilies and over 50 genera and 700 species of spiders, several of them named after celebrities: Filistata maguirei and Pritha garfieldi were named after the former Spider-Man actors Tobey Maguire and Andrew Garfield, Labialithus lindemanni was named after Till Lindemann, the lead vocalist and lyricist of the band Rammstein, Gorbiscape gorbachevi was named after the Russian and Soviet politician Mikhail Gorbachev, Loureedia phoenixi was named after the actor Joaquin Phoenix, and Loxosceles coheni was named after the singer-songwriter, poet and novelist Leonard Cohen.

== Selected publications ==
=== Books ===
- Marusik, Y. M. & Kovblyuk, M. M. (2011): Spiders (Arachnida, Aranei) of Siberia and Russian Far East. KMK Scientific Press, Moscow, 344 pp. [in Russian] PDF
- Gerlach, J. & Marusik, Y. M. (2010): Arachnida and Myriapoda of the Seychelles Islands. Siri Scientific Press, Rochdale, 435 pp.
- Logunov, D. V. & Marusik, Y. M. (2003): A revision of the genus Yllenus Simon, 1868 (Arachnida, Araneae, Salticidae). KMK Scientific Press, Moscow, 167 pp. PDF
- Logunov, D. V. & Marusik, Y. M. (2001): Catalogue of the jumping spiders of northern Asia (Arachnida, Araneae, Salticidae). KMK Scientific Press, Moscow, 300 pp. PDF
- Marusik, Y. M., Logunov, D. V. & Koponen, S. (2000): Spiders of Tuva, south Siberia. Institute for Biological Problems of the North, Magadan, 253 pp. PDF

== See also ==
- Marusik yurii, a gnaphosid spider from Vietnam described in 2023
