= Agelena gomerensis =

Scientific classification
- Kingdom: Animalia
- Phylum: Arthropoda
- Subphylum: Chelicerata
- Class: Arachnida
- Order: Araneae
- Infraorder: Araneomorphae
- Family: Agelenidae
- Genus: Agelena
- Species: A. gomerensis

Binomial name
- Agelena gomerensis Wunderlich, 1992

Species of spider

Agelena gomerensis is a spider species in the family Agelenidae. It is endemic to the Canary Islands.
