= Agelena borbonica =

Scientific classification
- Kingdom: Animalia
- Phylum: Arthropoda
- Subphylum: Chelicerata
- Class: Arachnida
- Order: Araneae
- Infraorder: Araneomorphae
- Family: Agelenidae
- Genus: Agelena
- Species: A. borbonica

Binomial name
- Agelena borbonica Vinson, 1863

Species of spider

Agelena borbonica is a spider species found in Réunion.
