= Agelena longipes =

Scientific classification
- Kingdom: Animalia
- Phylum: Arthropoda
- Subphylum: Chelicerata
- Class: Arachnida
- Order: Araneae
- Infraorder: Araneomorphae
- Family: Agelenidae
- Genus: Agelena
- Species: A. longipes

Binomial name
- Agelena longipes Carpenter, 1900

Species of spider

Agelena longipes is a species of spider in the family Agelenidae. It was first described in Carpenter, 1900. It is primarily found in England.
