= Agelena gonzalezi =

Scientific classification
- Kingdom: Animalia
- Phylum: Arthropoda
- Subphylum: Chelicerata
- Class: Arachnida
- Order: Araneae
- Infraorder: Araneomorphae
- Family: Agelenidae
- Genus: Agelena
- Species: A. gonzalezi

Binomial name
- Agelena gonzalezi Schmidt, 1980

Species of spider

Agelena gonzalezi is a spider species in the family Agelenidae. It is endemic to the Canary Islands.
