= Agelena canariensis =

Scientific classification
- Kingdom: Animalia
- Phylum: Arthropoda
- Subphylum: Chelicerata
- Class: Arachnida
- Order: Araneae
- Infraorder: Araneomorphae
- Family: Agelenidae
- Genus: Agelena
- Species: A. canariensis

Binomial name
- Agelena canariensis Lucas, 1838

Species of spider

Agelena canariensis is a species of spider in the family Agelenidae. It was first described by Lucas in 1838. It is native to the Canary Islands, Algeria and Morocco.
