= Agelena howelli =

Scientific classification
- Kingdom: Animalia
- Phylum: Arthropoda
- Subphylum: Chelicerata
- Class: Arachnida
- Order: Araneae
- Infraorder: Araneomorphae
- Family: Agelenidae
- Genus: Agelena
- Species: A. howelli

Binomial name
- Agelena howelli Benoit, 1978

Species of spider

Agelena howelli is a species of spider in the family Agelenidae, which contains at least 1,315 species of funnel-web spiders as of August 2021. It was first described by Benoit, in 1978. It is primarily found in Tanzania.
