= Agelena oaklandensis =

Scientific classification
- Kingdom: Animalia
- Phylum: Arthropoda
- Subphylum: Chelicerata
- Class: Arachnida
- Order: Araneae
- Infraorder: Araneomorphae
- Family: Agelenidae
- Genus: Agelena
- Species: A. oaklandensis

Binomial name
- Agelena oaklandensis Barman, 1979

Species of spider

Agelena oaklandensis is a species of spider in the family Agelenidae. It was first described by Manoranjan Barman in 1979 and is native to India.
