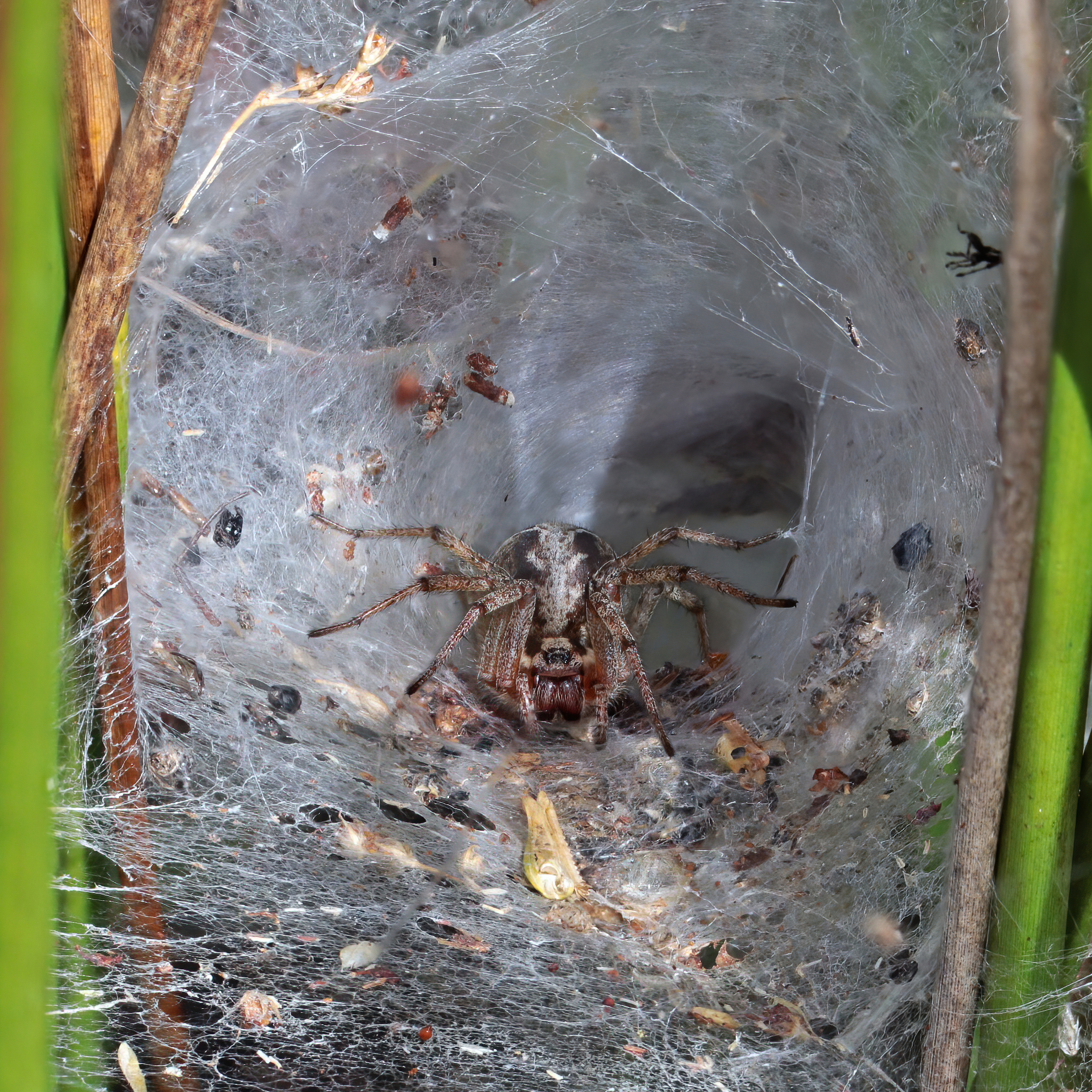
- Female in web funnel

Scientific classification
- Kingdom: Animalia
- Phylum: Arthropoda
- Subphylum: Chelicerata
- Class: Arachnida
- Order: Araneae
- Infraorder: Araneomorphae
- Family: Agelenidae
- Genus: Agelena
- Species: A. labyrinthica

Binomial name
- Agelena labyrinthica (Clerck, 1757)

Synonyms
- Araneus labyrinthicus Clerck, 1757

= Agelena labyrinthica =

Species of spider

Agelena labyrinthica, commonly known as labyrinth spider is a species of spider in the family Agelenidae. It is a widespread species in Europe and its range extends to Central and East Asia.

== Range and habitat ==
Male Agelena labyrinthica in his retreat and web

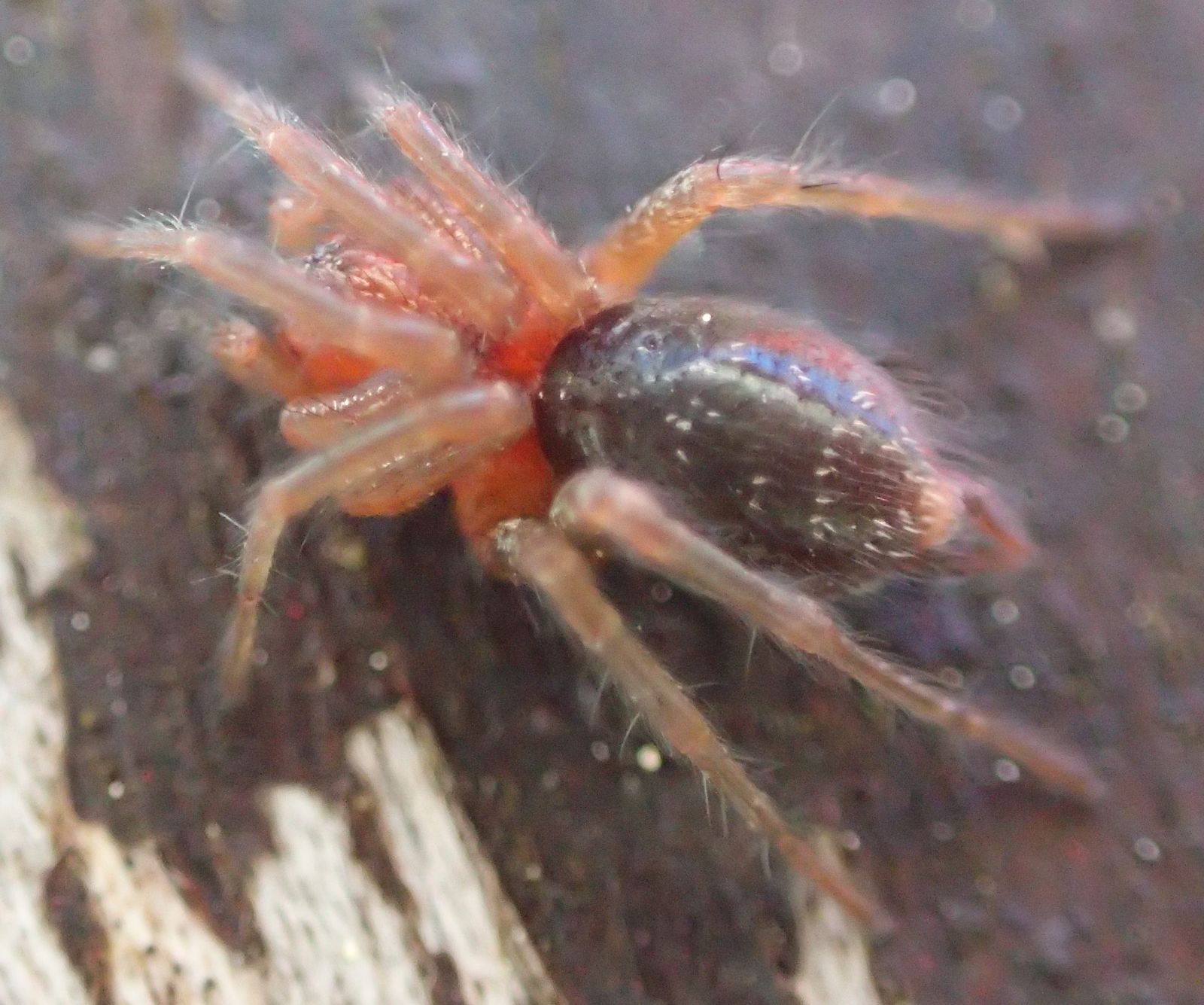
A very young individual

These spiders are fairly common in Europe and Central Europe, and are typically concentrated in areas near forests and low lying vegetation, as well as in dry grasslands. Its range extends to Central and East Asia (Mongolia, China, Korea, Japan).

Agelena labyrinthica build flat plate surface webs connected to funnel-shaped retreats similar to labyrinths, which are typically constructed between low lying grass and vegetation. These webs can be at ground level, or up to 1.5 metres (5 ft) from the ground, however, the majority are found approximately 60 centimetres (2 ft) off the ground.

== Description ==
Funnel-web spiders typically range in size from 8–12 millimetres (0.31–0.47 inches) for males and 10–14 mm (0.39–0.55 in) for females. Agelena labyrinthica, however, has a body length of up to 18 mm (0.71 in). The abdomen is dark with a pale central band flanked by white chevron marks. The cephalothorax is yellow-brown and bears two, broad longitudinal stripes positioned towards the front of the spider.

Common to all spiders in the family Agelenidae, is the prominent pair of two segmented posterior spinnerets. However, in A. labyrinthica these segmented spinnerets are further elongated, with the second segment being almost twice the length of the basal segment. Another morphological feature of A. labyrinthica is the spider's venom apparatus. Showing many similarities with the species Loxosceles intermedia, the venom glands of A. labyrinthica generally consists of paired structures located in the spider's abdomen. These paired structures interact with two ducts that lead into the spider's fangs. The venom glands of A. labyrinthica are considered to be relatively large, and extend out of the chelicerae to reach the middle of the abdomen. The venom glands of A. labyrinthica also are unique in that they are long and tubular and are surrounded by a layer of muscles that encircle the glands.

=== Sensory organs ===
Different from other spiders in the family Agelenidae, the A. labyrinthica, has a set of at least four trichobothria on the upper side of their tarsus of the first pair of legs. A. labyrinthica have approximately 25 trichobothria per walking leg. These hairs help the spider detect prey that has been caught in its web, or even prey that is near enough to cause vibrations in its web. The trichobothria hairs essentially act as a long-distance sensory system for A. labyrinthica that helps them detect prey with great accuracy and speed.

== Spatial perception ==
Having to travel between its sheet web and its funnel shaped retreat, A. labyrinthica have shown signs of detour compensation that allow the spider to orient itself and navigate even in complete darkness. Using its eyes to quickly navigate its web, A. labyrinthica is able to detect the plane of polarized light present, and position itself relative to it in order to maintain its orientation. However, being a web building spider, A. labyrinthica does not rely exclusively on visual stimuli for navigation and orientation. A. labyrinthica also relies on its idiothetic orientation, as well as directional cues such as gravity, to gain its bearings no matter where it is.

== Reproduction and life cycle ==
Typically in the middle of July, A. labyrinthica will begin its mating period. Using its pedipalps, the male will tap on the web of the female in order to advertise himself as a potential mate. If the female is ready, she will remain in her funnel, where they then mate. During about August of the same year, the female will create a large, white egg sac, containing roughly 50–130 eggs, within the central remaining chamber of her web, suspended by multiple radiating bands of silk. The outer wall of the retreat may be camouflaged with grass and leaves. Over the winter of the same year, the young spiders survive off of the egg yolk stored in their abdomens, and leave the next spring. A. labyrinthica is similar to other species of spider in the respect that they practice matriphagy. During the incubation phase, the female A. labyrinthica stays with developing egg sacs, yet if the female dies before the incubation phase is over, the corpse will be eaten by the young upon hatching.
