= Agelena annulipedella =

Scientific classification
- Kingdom: Animalia
- Phylum: Arthropoda
- Subphylum: Chelicerata
- Class: Arachnida
- Order: Araneae
- Infraorder: Araneomorphae
- Family: Agelenidae
- Genus: Agelena
- Species: A. annulipedella

Binomial name
- Agelena annulipedella Strand, 1913

Species of spider

Agelena annulipedella is a species of spider in the family Agelenidae. It was first described by Strand in 1913. It is commonly found in central Africa.
