= Agelena lukla =

Scientific classification
- Kingdom: Animalia
- Phylum: Arthropoda
- Subphylum: Chelicerata
- Class: Arachnida
- Order: Araneae
- Infraorder: Araneomorphae
- Family: Agelenidae
- Genus: Agelena
- Species: A. lukla

Binomial name
- Agelena lukla Nishikawa, 1980

Species of spider

Agelena lukla is a species of spider in the family Agelenidae. It was first described by Nishikawa, in 1980. It is primarily found in Nepal.
