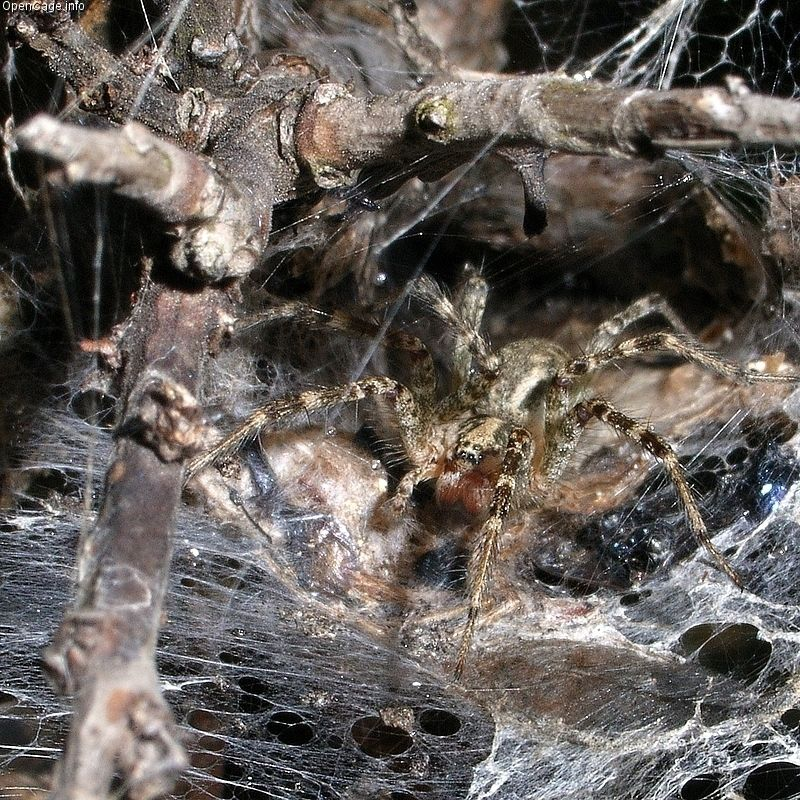

Scientific classification
- Kingdom: Animalia
- Phylum: Arthropoda
- Subphylum: Chelicerata
- Class: Arachnida
- Order: Araneae
- Infraorder: Araneomorphae
- Family: Agelenidae
- Genus: Agelena
- Species: A. limbata

Binomial name
- Agelena limbata Thorell, 1897

= Agelena limbata =

Species of spider

Agelena limbata is a species of spider in the family Agelenidae. It was described by Tamerlan Thorell in 1897. It is found in Myanmar, Laos, China, and Taiwan.
