= Agelena doris =

Scientific classification
- Domain: Eukaryota
- Kingdom: Animalia
- Phylum: Arthropoda
- Subphylum: Chelicerata
- Class: Arachnida
- Order: Araneae
- Infraorder: Araneomorphae
- Family: Agelenidae
- Genus: Agelena
- Species: A. doris

Binomial name
- Agelena doris Hogg, 1922

Species of spider

Agelena doris is a species of spider in the family Agelenidae, which contains at least 1,315 species of funnel-web spiders as of August 2021. It has been described by Hogg, in 1922. It is primarily found in Vietnam.
