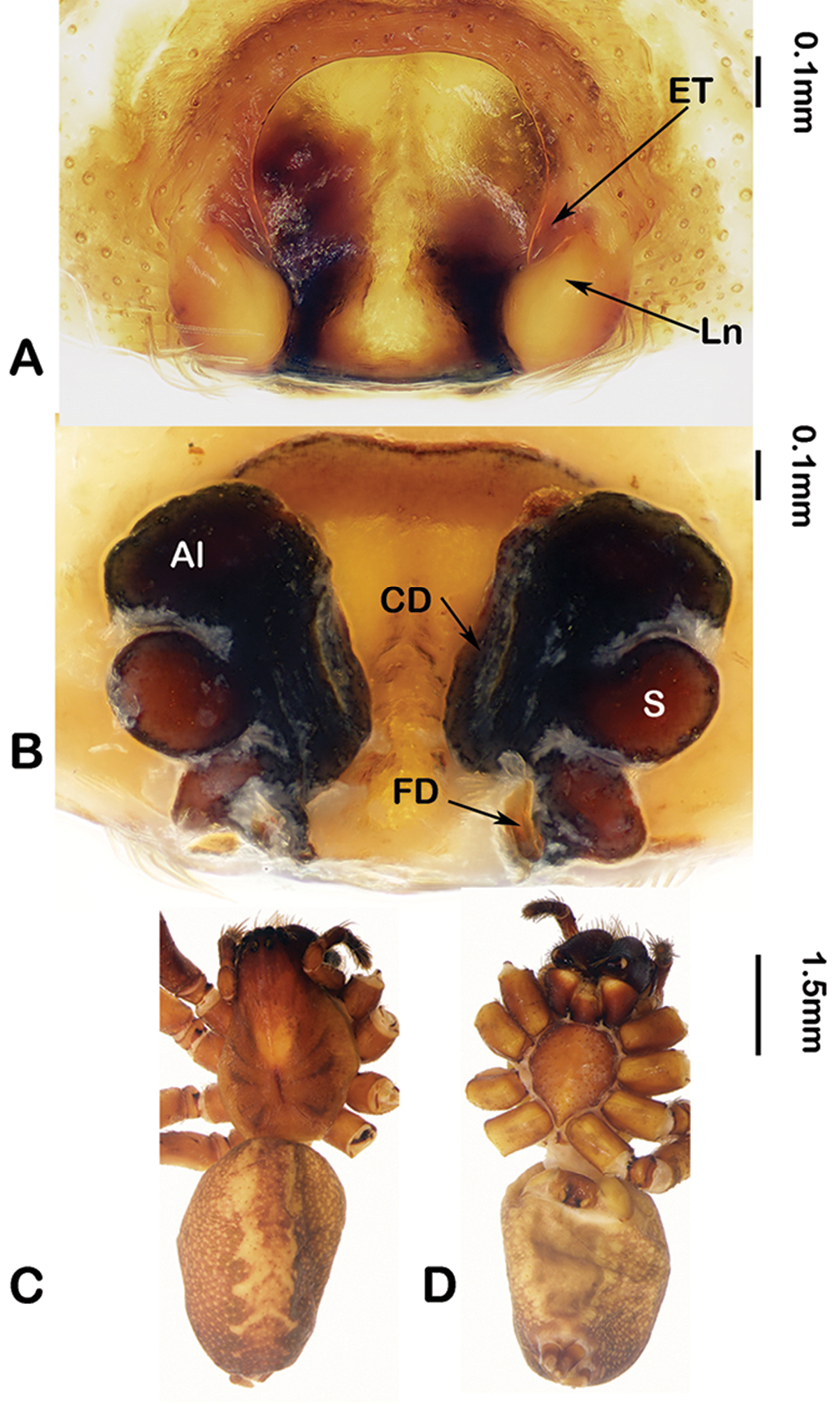

Scientific classification
- Kingdom: Animalia
- Phylum: Arthropoda
- Subphylum: Chelicerata
- Class: Arachnida
- Order: Araneae
- Infraorder: Araneomorphae
- Family: Agelenidae
- Genus: Mistaria
- Species: M. fagei

Binomial name
- Mistaria fagei (Caporiacco, 1949)

Synonyms
- Agelena fagei Caporiacco, 1949

= Mistaria fagei =

Species of spider

Mistaria fagei is a species of spider in the family Agelenidae. It is native to Kenya. It was first described by Caporiacco in 1949 as Agelena fagei, and transferred to the genus Mistaria in 2018. It is named for the French zoologist Louis Fage, and so should be pronounced /ˈfɑːʒiː/.
