= Agelena injuria =

Scientific classification
- Domain: Eukaryota
- Kingdom: Animalia
- Phylum: Arthropoda
- Subphylum: Chelicerata
- Class: Arachnida
- Order: Araneae
- Infraorder: Araneomorphae
- Family: Agelenidae
- Genus: Agelena
- Species: A. injuria

Binomial name
- Agelena injuria Fox, 1936

Species of spider

Agelena injuria is a species of spider in the family Agelenidae, which contains at least 1,315 species of funnel-web spiders as of August 2021. It has been described by Fox, in 1936. It is primarily found in China.
