= Agelena gautami =

Scientific classification
- Domain: Eukaryota
- Kingdom: Animalia
- Phylum: Arthropoda
- Subphylum: Chelicerata
- Class: Arachnida
- Order: Araneae
- Infraorder: Araneomorphae
- Family: Agelenidae
- Genus: Agelena
- Species: A. gautami

Binomial name
- Agelena gautami Tikader, 1962

Species of spider

Agelena gautami is a species of spider in the Agelenidae family, which contains at least 1,315 species of funnel-weaver spiders as of August 2021. It was first described by Tikader in 1962. It is primarily found in India.
