= Agelena nigra =

Scientific classification
- Kingdom: Animalia
- Phylum: Arthropoda
- Subphylum: Chelicerata
- Class: Arachnida
- Order: Araneae
- Infraorder: Araneomorphae
- Family: Agelenidae
- Genus: Agelena
- Species: A. nigra

Binomial name
- Agelena nigra Caporiacco, 1940

Species of spider

Agelena nigra is a species of spider in the family Agelenidae. It was first described by Caporiacco, in 1940. It is primarily found in Ethiopia.
