= Agelena lingua =

Scientific classification
- Kingdom: Animalia
- Phylum: Arthropoda
- Subphylum: Chelicerata
- Class: Arachnida
- Order: Araneae
- Infraorder: Araneomorphae
- Family: Agelenidae
- Genus: Agelena
- Species: A. lingua

Binomial name
- Agelena lingua Strand, 1913

Species of spider

Agelena lingua is a species of spider in the family Agelenidae. It was first described by Embrik Strand, in 1913. It is primarily found in Central Africa.
