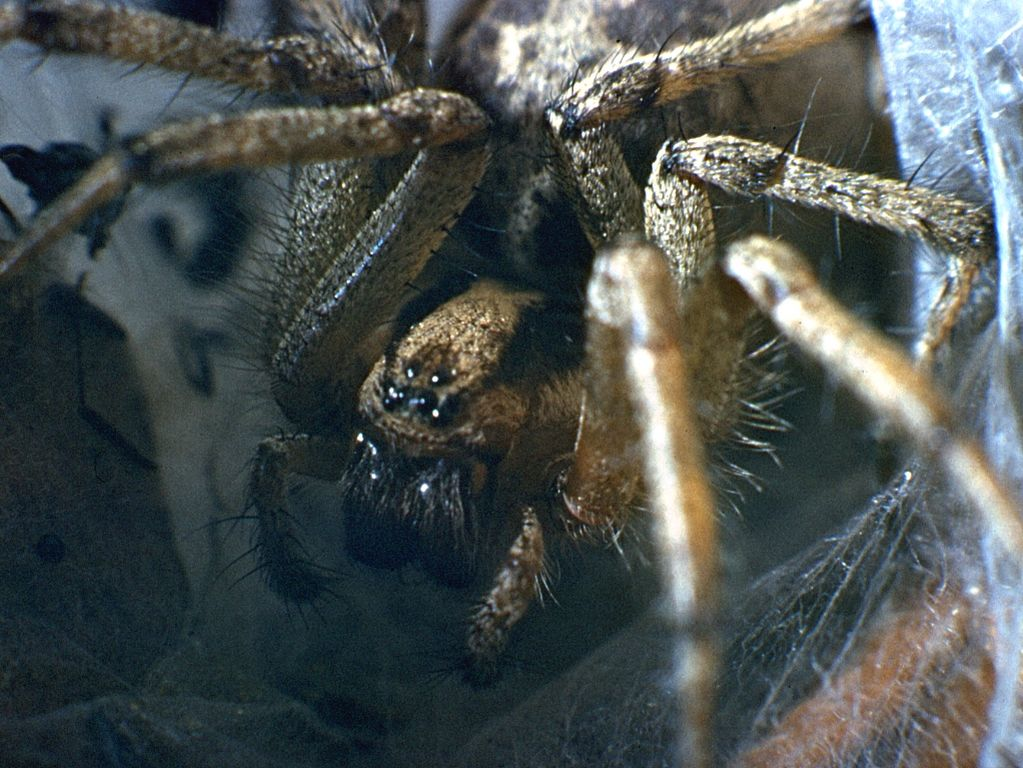
- Female

Scientific classification
- Domain: Eukaryota
- Kingdom: Animalia
- Phylum: Arthropoda
- Subphylum: Chelicerata
- Class: Arachnida
- Order: Araneae
- Infraorder: Araneomorphae
- Family: Agelenidae
- Genus: Agelena
- Species: A. orientalis

Binomial name
- Agelena orientalis C. L. Koch, 1837

= Agelena orientalis =

Species of spider

Agelena orientalis is a species of spiders belonging to the family Agelenidae.

== Description ==
Agelena orientalis can reach a total length of 11–13.6 millimetres (0.43–0.54 in) in males, 12.2–17.7 millimetres (0.48–0.70 in) in females. Coloration is yellowish, with a characteristic pattern of the upperside of the abdomen. These spiders trap their preys by weaving entangling non-sticky funnel webs.

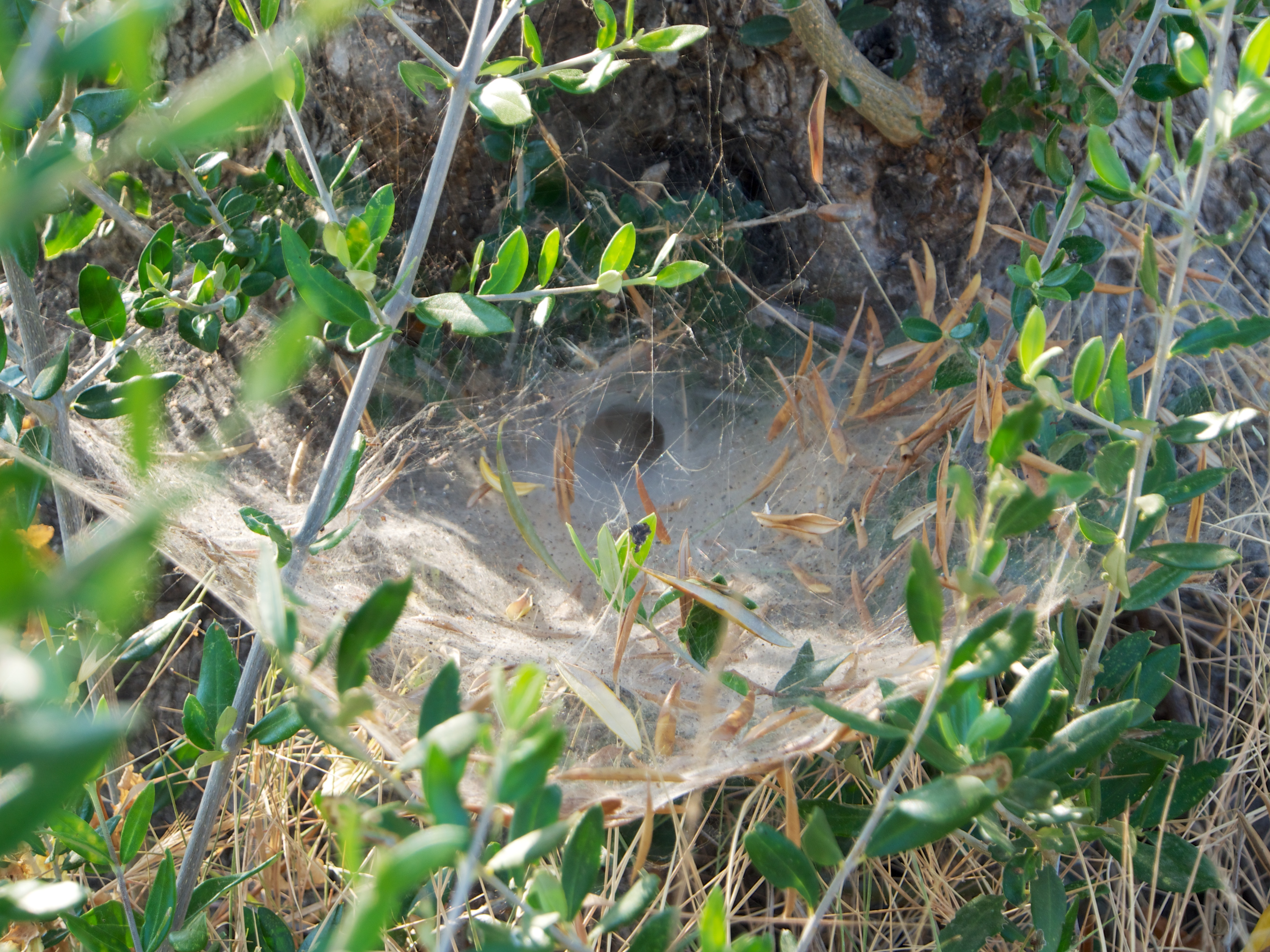
Funnel web of Agelena orientalis

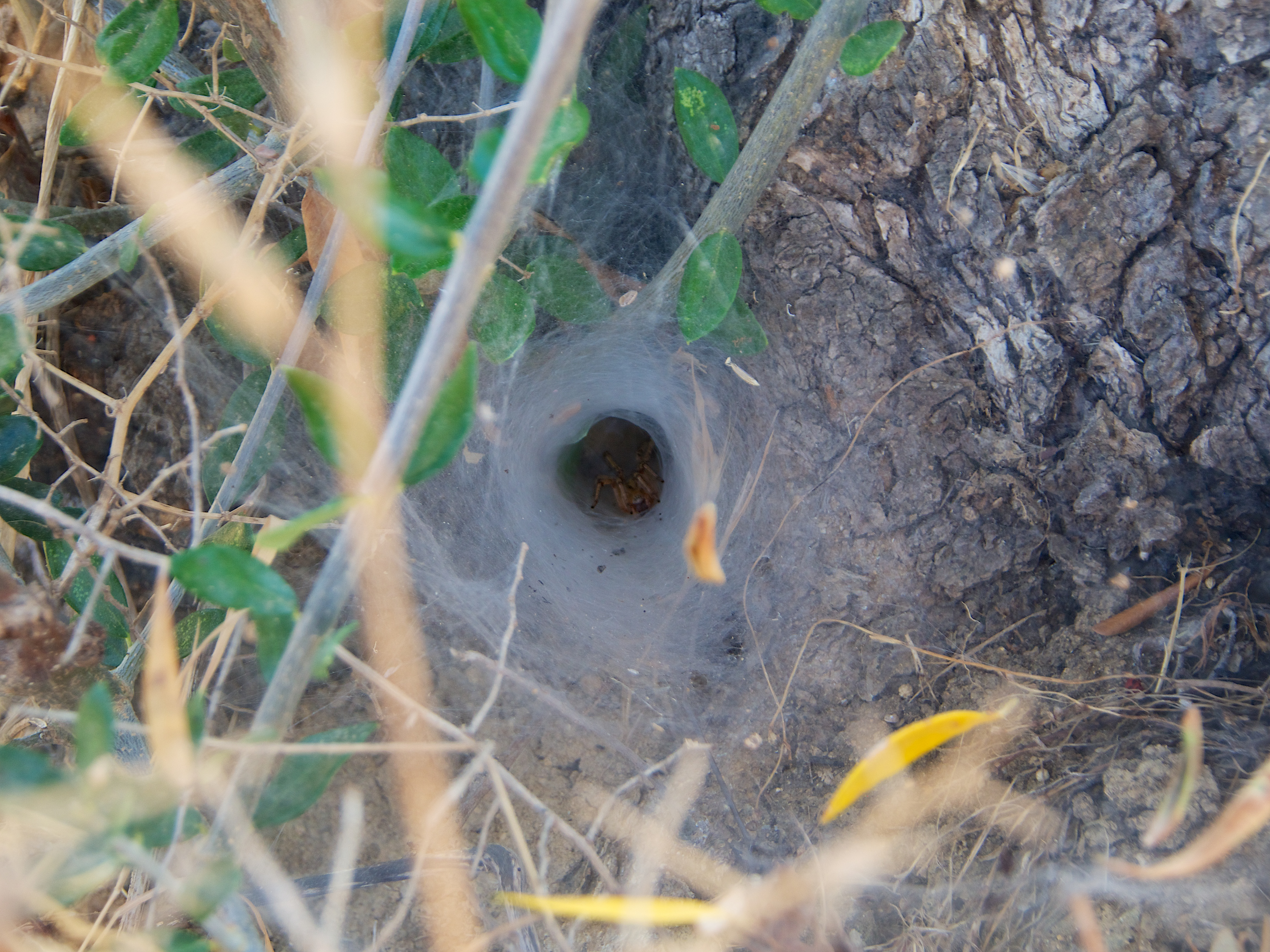
An agelena hiding in its funnel

== Distribution ==
This species is present from Italy to Central Asia and Iran.
