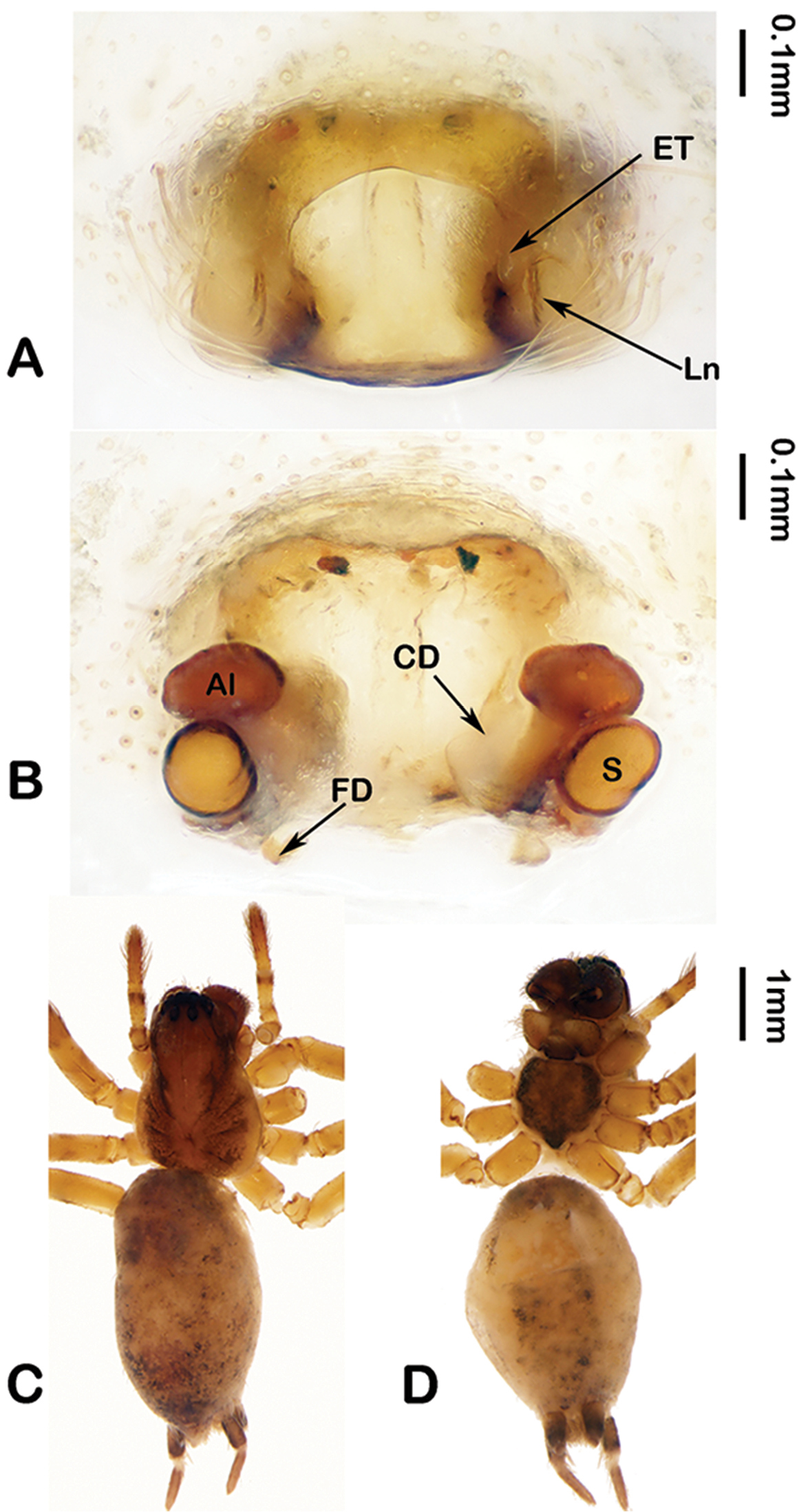

Scientific classification
- Kingdom: Animalia
- Phylum: Arthropoda
- Subphylum: Chelicerata
- Class: Arachnida
- Order: Araneae
- Infraorder: Araneomorphae
- Family: Agelenidae
- Genus: Mistaria
- Species: M. zorica

Binomial name
- Mistaria zorica (Strand, 1913)

Synonyms
- Agelena zorica Strand, 1913

= Mistaria zorica =

Species of spider

Mistaria zorica is a species of spider in the family Agelenidae. It is native to Central and East Africa. It was first described by Strand in 1913 as Agelena zorica, and transferred to the genus Mistaria in 2018.
