= Agelena atlantea =

Scientific classification
- Domain: Eukaryota
- Kingdom: Animalia
- Phylum: Arthropoda
- Subphylum: Chelicerata
- Class: Arachnida
- Order: Araneae
- Infraorder: Araneomorphae
- Family: Agelenidae
- Genus: Agelena
- Species: A. atlantea

Binomial name
- Agelena atlantea Fage, 1938

Species of spider

Agelena atlantea is a species of spider in the family Agelenidae, which contains at least 1,315 species of funnel-web spiders as of August 2021. It was first described by Fage in 1938. It is commonly found in Morocco.
