= Agelena incertissima =

Scientific classification
- Kingdom: Animalia
- Phylum: Arthropoda
- Subphylum: Chelicerata
- Class: Arachnida
- Order: Araneae
- Infraorder: Araneomorphae
- Family: Agelenidae
- Genus: Agelena
- Species: A. incertissima

Binomial name
- Agelena incertissima Caporiacco, 1939

Species of spider

Agelena incertissima is a species of spider in the family Agelenidae. It was first described by Caporiacco in 1940 and is native to Ethiopia.
