= Mistaria kiwuensis =

Scientific classification
- Kingdom: Animalia
- Phylum: Arthropoda
- Subphylum: Chelicerata
- Class: Arachnida
- Order: Araneae
- Infraorder: Araneomorphae
- Family: Agelenidae
- Genus: Mistaria
- Species: M. kiwuensis

Binomial name
- Mistaria kiwuensis (Strand, 1913)

Synonyms
- Agelena jumbo kiwuensis Strand, 1913; Mistaria jumbo kiwuensis (Strand, 1913)

Species of spider

Mistaria kiwuensis is a species of spider in the family Agelenidae. It was first described by Strand in 1913 as the subspecies Agelena jumbo kiwuensis. Agelena jumbo was moved to the genus Mistaria in 2019, so that the subspecies became Mistaria jumbo kiwuensis. It was then elevated to the full species Mistaria kiwuensis later in the same year. It is native to the Democratic Republic of the Congo.
