= Agelena choi =

Scientific classification
- Kingdom: Animalia
- Phylum: Arthropoda
- Subphylum: Chelicerata
- Class: Arachnida
- Order: Araneae
- Infraorder: Araneomorphae
- Family: Agelenidae
- Genus: Agelena
- Species: A. choi

Binomial name
- Agelena choi Paik, 1965

Species of spider

Agelena choi is a species of spider in the family Agelenidae. It was first described by Paik Kap Yong in 1965. It is endemic to Korea, where it is found throughout the peninsula.
