= Agelena poliosata =

Scientific classification
- Kingdom: Animalia
- Phylum: Arthropoda
- Subphylum: Chelicerata
- Class: Arachnida
- Order: Araneae
- Infraorder: Araneomorphae
- Family: Agelenidae
- Genus: Agelena
- Species: A. poliosata

Binomial name
- Agelena poliosata Wang, 1991

Synonyms
- Agelena micropunctulata Wang, 1992

Species of spider

Agelena poliosata is a species of spider in the family Agelenidae. It was first described by Jiafu Wang in 1991 and is native to China.
