= Agelena chayu =

Scientific classification
- Kingdom: Animalia
- Phylum: Arthropoda
- Subphylum: Chelicerata
- Class: Arachnida
- Order: Araneae
- Infraorder: Araneomorphae
- Family: Agelenidae
- Genus: Agelena
- Species: A. chayu

Binomial name
- Agelena chayu Zhang, Zhu & Song, 2005

Species of spider

Agelena chayu is a species of spider in the family Agelenidae. It was first described by Zhang, Zhu & Song in 2005. It is native to China.
