= Agelena babai =

Scientific classification
- Kingdom: Animalia
- Phylum: Arthropoda
- Subphylum: Chelicerata
- Class: Arachnida
- Order: Araneae
- Infraorder: Araneomorphae
- Family: Agelenidae
- Genus: Agelena
- Species: A. babai

Binomial name
- Agelena babai Tanikawa, 2005

Species of spider

Agelena babai is a species of spider in the family Agelenidae, which contains at least 1,315 species of funnel-web spiders as of August 2021. It was described by Akio Tanikawa in 2005. It is endemic to Japan.
