= Agelena barunae =

Scientific classification
- Kingdom: Animalia
- Phylum: Arthropoda
- Subphylum: Chelicerata
- Class: Arachnida
- Order: Araneae
- Infraorder: Araneomorphae
- Family: Agelenidae
- Genus: Agelena
- Species: A. barunae

Binomial name
- Agelena barunae Tikader, 1970

Species of spider

Agelena barunae is a species of spider in the family Agelenidae. It was first described by Tikader in 1970. It is native to India.
