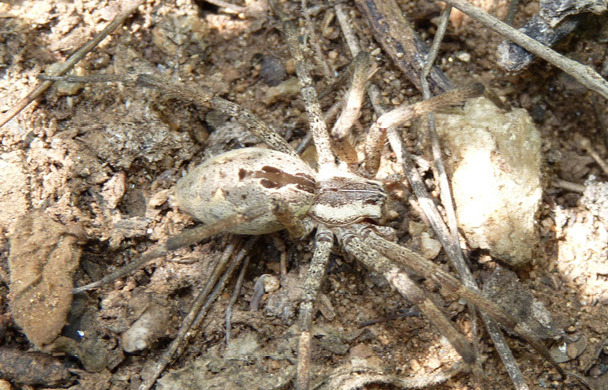

Scientific classification
- Kingdom: Animalia
- Phylum: Arthropoda
- Subphylum: Chelicerata
- Class: Arachnida
- Order: Araneae
- Infraorder: Araneomorphae
- Family: Agelenidae
- Genus: Agelena
- Species: A. inda

Binomial name
- Agelena inda Simon, 1897

= Agelena inda =

Species of spider

Agelena inda is a species of spider in the family Agelenidae, which contains at least 1,315 species of funnel-web spiders as of August 2021. It has been described by Simon, in 1897. It is primarily found in India.
