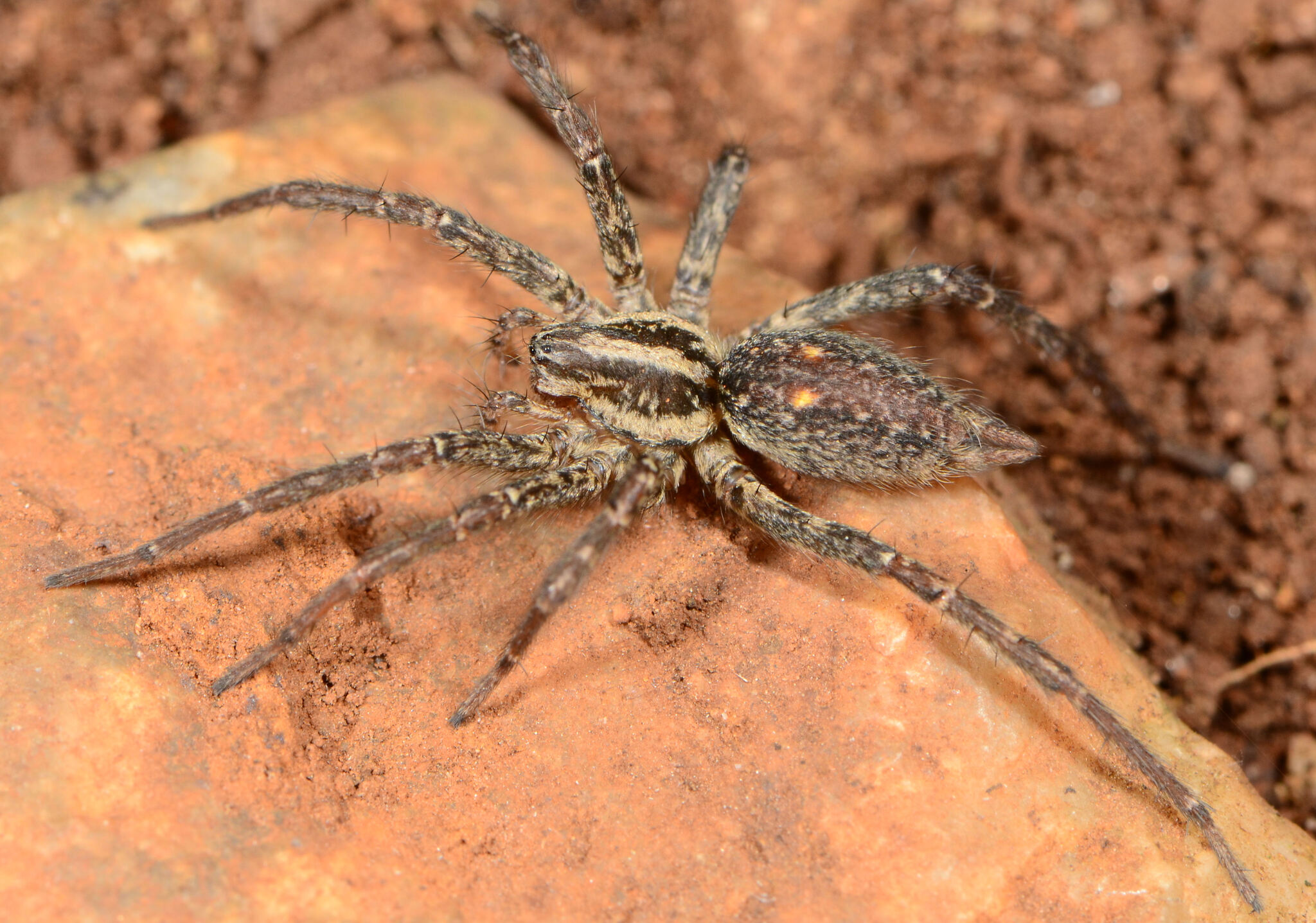
- female
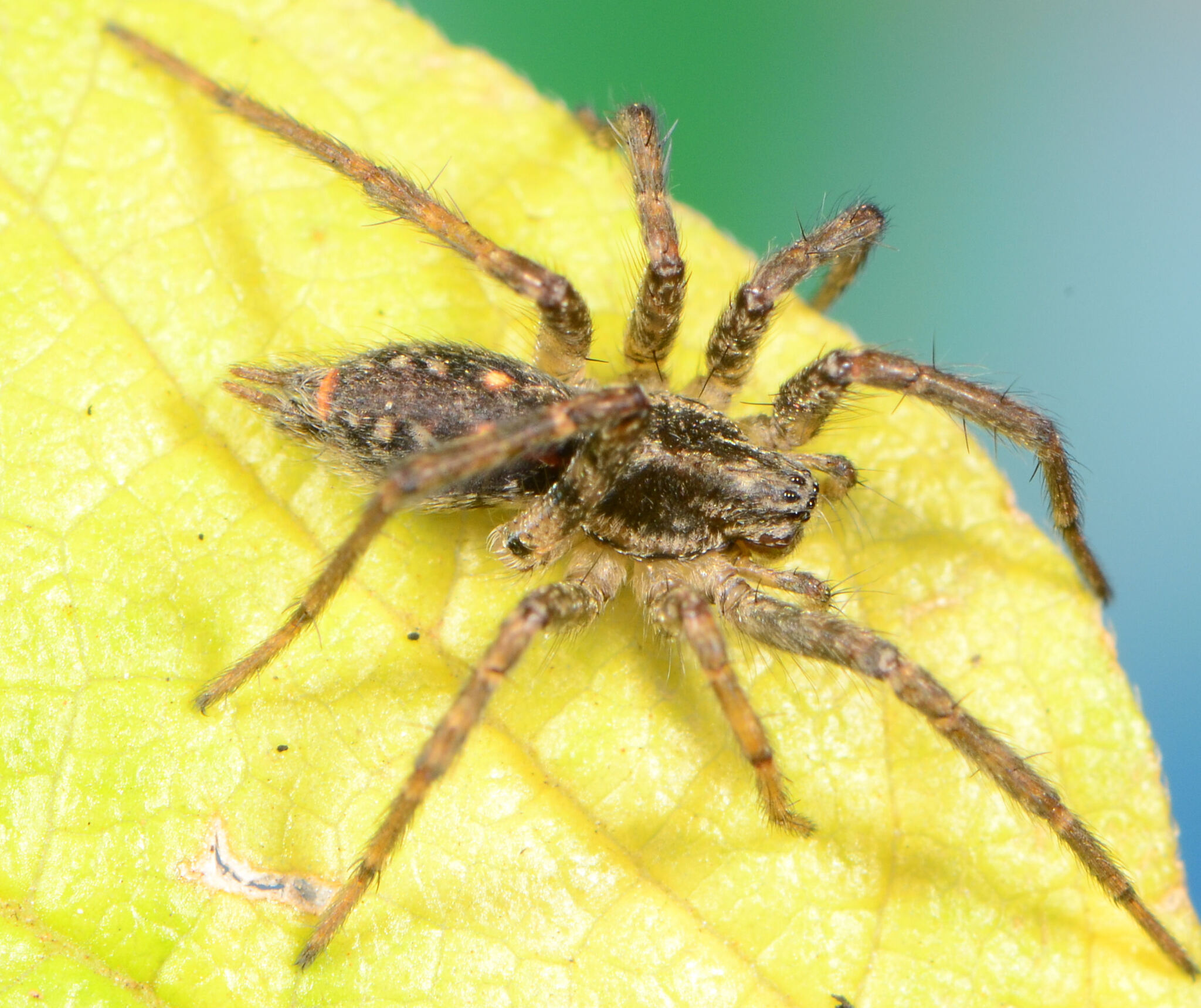
- female

Scientific classification
- Kingdom: Animalia
- Phylum: Arthropoda
- Subphylum: Chelicerata
- Class: Arachnida
- Order: Araneae
- Infraorder: Araneomorphae
- Family: Agelenidae
- Genus: Agelena
- Species: A. gaerdesi

Binomial name
- Agelena gaerdesi Roewer, 1955

= Agelena gaerdesi =

Gaerdes's Agelena Grass Funnel-Web Spider

Species of spider

Agelena gaerdesi is a species of spider of the genus Agelena. It is endemic to southern Africa, where it is found in Namibia, Botswana, and South Africa. The species is commonly known as Gaerdes's Agelena Grass Funnel-Web Spider.

== Distribution ==
Agelena gaerdesi has been recorded from Namibia, Botswana and South Africa. In South Africa, the species is widespread, occurring throughout the country with records from 12 protected areas.

In South Africa, it has been documented from all provinces.

== Habitat ==
Agelena gaerdesi is a web dweller that typically builds funnel-webs in low vegetation close to the soil surface. The species has been sampled from all South African floral biomes. Research in the Nama Karoo has shown that populations are low in winter and spring, but peak suddenly at the start of summer in December, after which numbers gradually decrease until winter. Males consistently form more than 50% of the population.

The species is found from 76 to 1,850 metres above sea level.

== Description ==
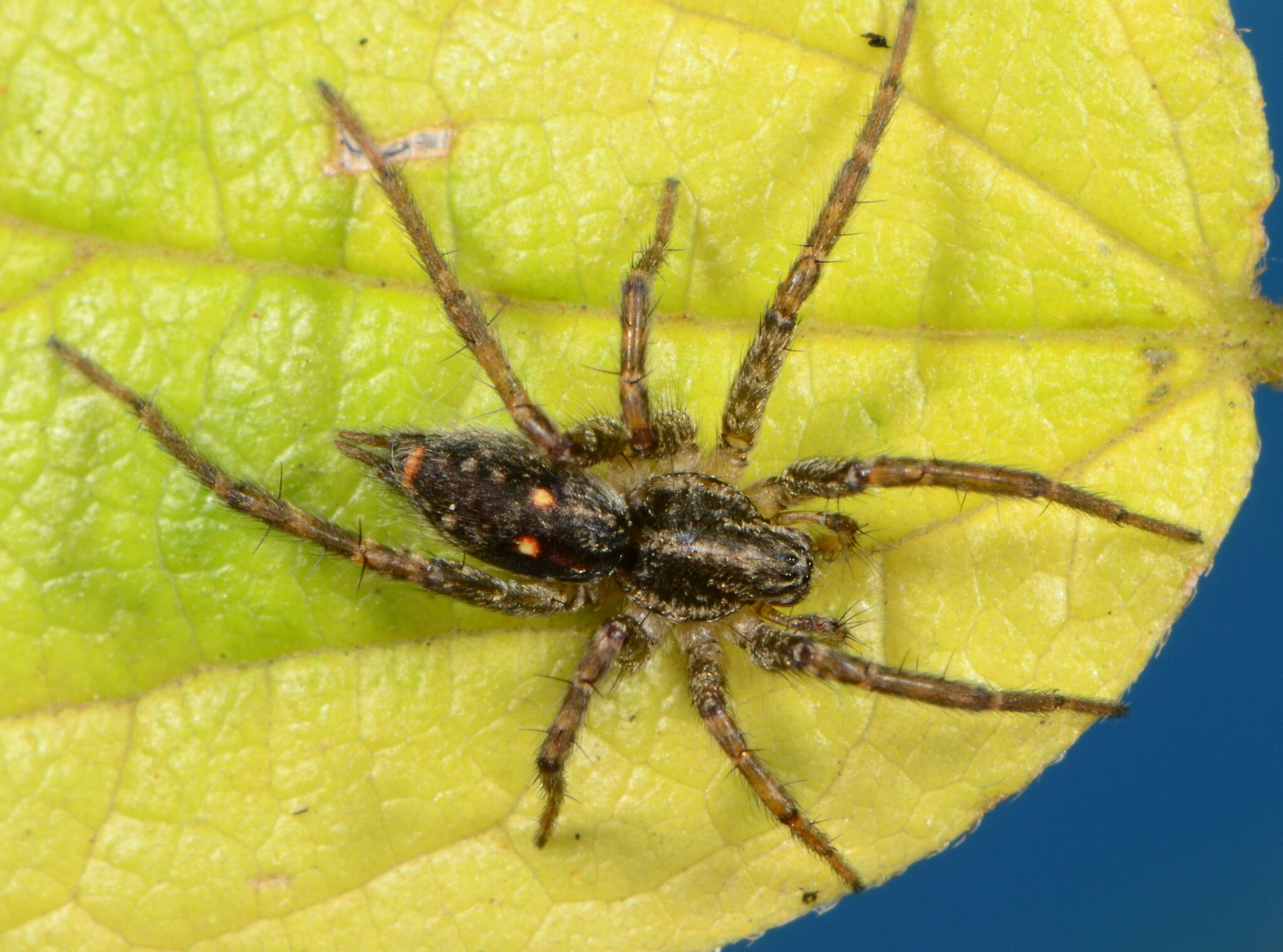
female

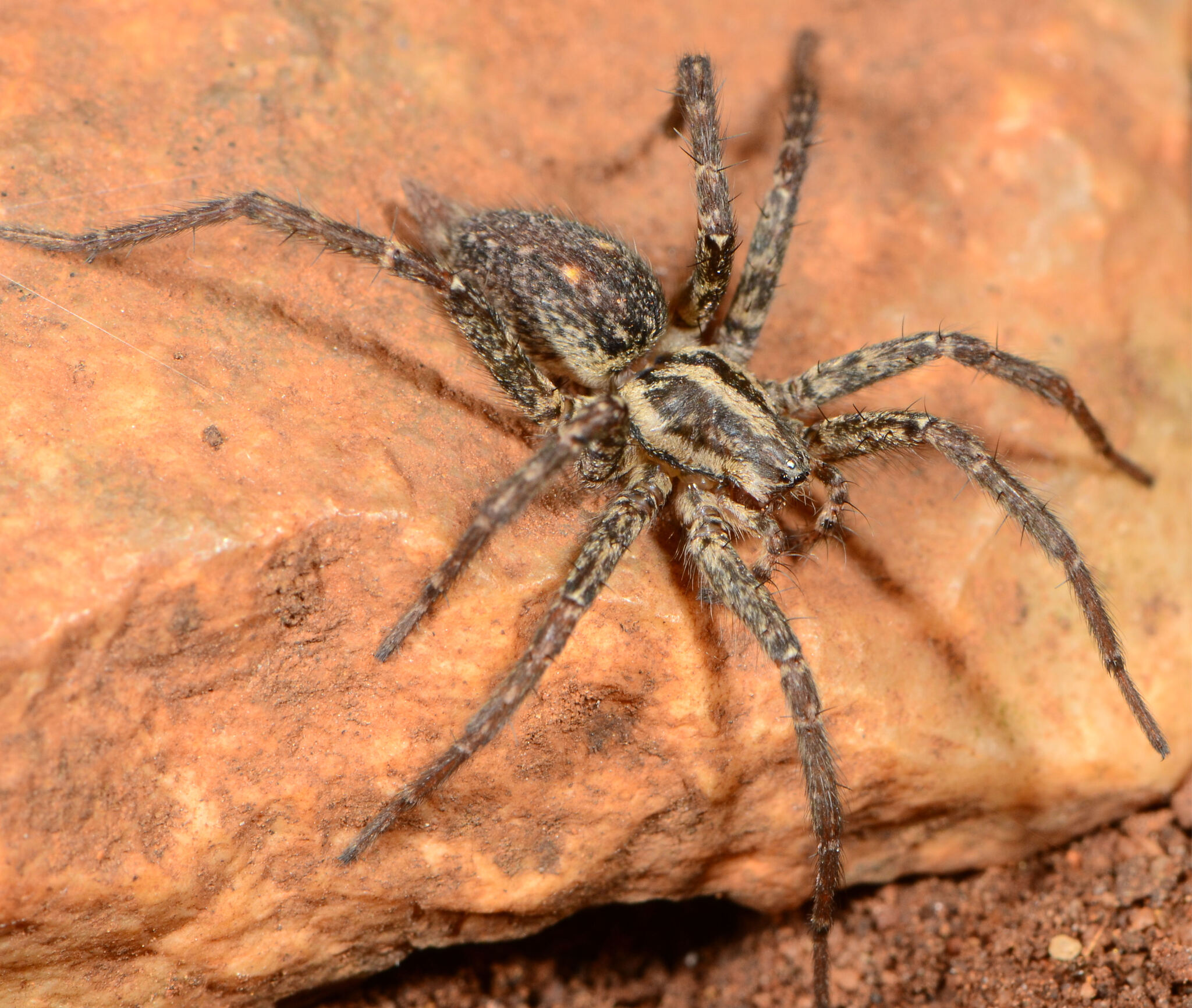
female

Only the female of Agelena gaerdesi has been formally described, and identification of males remains problematic.

The female has a total body length of 8 mm, with the cephalothorax measuring 3.5 mm and the opisthosoma 4.5 mm. The eye arrangement consists of both eye rows being procurved, with the anterior tangent of the median eyes cutting the lateral eyes in the middle, while the anterior tangent of the posterior median eyes touches the posterior median eyes from behind.

The epigyne is distinctive among Agelena species, appearing as a shallow, plate-like depression without anterior elevations or median septum. In the center, there is a pair of circular rings with a ridge that curves somewhat backward in the median area. The lateral margins of this ridge are robust, lacking median teeth, and their ends are curved inward medially.

The cephalothorax is uniformly pale yellow without markings, as is the sternum and leg coxae. The opisthosoma is dorsally pale yellow with a median band extending to the posterior end. This band is bordered laterally by deep black wavy lines composed of closely packed white spots. The median band encloses a yellowish, non-white spotted median wedge that contains three pairs of small black spots. Lateral to this median band are four larger, circular black spots, and the sides of the abdomen are covered with numerous small black spots. The ventral surface is uniformly pale yellow, as are the spinnerets.

== Conservation status ==
The species is listed as Least Concern due to its wide geographical range and occurrence in multiple protected areas. It is protected in 12 protected areas in South Africa, and no specific conservation actions are currently recommended.
