= Agelena maracandensis =

Scientific classification
- Kingdom: Animalia
- Phylum: Arthropoda
- Subphylum: Chelicerata
- Class: Arachnida
- Order: Araneae
- Infraorder: Araneomorphae
- Family: Agelenidae
- Genus: Agelena
- Species: A. maracandensis

Binomial name
- Agelena maracandensis (Charitonov, 1946)

Synonyms
- Tegenaria maracandensis Charitonov, 1946

Species of spider

Agelena maracandensis is a species of spider in the family Agelenidae. It was first described by Dmitry Charitonov in 1946 and is native to Central Asia.
