= Agelena tungchis =

Scientific classification
- Domain: Eukaryota
- Kingdom: Animalia
- Phylum: Arthropoda
- Subphylum: Chelicerata
- Class: Arachnida
- Order: Araneae
- Infraorder: Araneomorphae
- Family: Agelenidae
- Genus: Agelena
- Species: A. tungchis

Binomial name
- Agelena tungchis Lee, 1998

Species of spider

Agelena tungchis is a species of spider in the family Agelenidae, which contains at least 1,315 species of funnel-web spiders as of August 2021. It was first described by Jeng-Di Lee in 1998. It is endemic to Taiwan.
