= Agelena dubiosa =

Scientific classification
- Kingdom: Animalia
- Phylum: Arthropoda
- Subphylum: Chelicerata
- Class: Arachnida
- Order: Araneae
- Infraorder: Araneomorphae
- Family: Agelenidae
- Genus: Agelena
- Species: A. dubiosa

Binomial name
- Agelena dubiosa Strand, 1908

Species of spider

Agelena dubiosa is a species of spider in the family Agelenidae, which contains at least 1,315 species of funnel-web spiders as of August 2021. It was first described by Embrik Strand, 1908. It is primarily found in Ethiopia.
