= Agelena australis =

Conservation status
- Least Concern (IUCN 3.1)

Scientific classification
- Kingdom: Animalia
- Phylum: Arthropoda
- Subphylum: Chelicerata
- Class: Arachnida
- Order: Araneae
- Infraorder: Araneomorphae
- Family: Agelenidae
- Genus: Agelena
- Species: A. australis

Binomial name
- Agelena australis Simon, 1897

Species of spider

Agelena australis is a species of spider of the genus Agelena in the family Agelenidae. It is native to southern and eastern Africa.

== Distribution ==
Agelena australis has been recorded from Kenya, Namibia, Botswana, Zimbabwe, and South Africa. In South Africa, the species is known from four provinces: the Free State, Limpopo, Northern Cape, and Western Cape.

== Habitat ==
Agelena australis is commonly found in grassland environments and savanna biomes. The species constructs distinctive funnel webs that are easily visible in the early morning when covered with dew.

It has been found at elevations ranging from 1,107 to 1,412 metres above sea level.

== Description ==
The original description by Simon in 1897 describes the female as having a body length of 13 mm. The cephalothorax is elongated and brownish-black in color, with a median stripe and marginal stripes on each side that are sinuous and pale yellowish-brown with scattered whitish-yellow plumose hairs. The opisthosoma is oblong and brownish, paler underneath, with a broad reddish stripe that is sinuously toothed at the front and marked above with plumose whitish-yellow hairs covering the entire surface.

The chelicerae, parts of the mouth, and sternum are blackish, covered with bristly hairs. The legs are tawny-reddish with whitish-yellow pubescence, and are bristly with black spines on the femora. The eyes are arranged with the anterior eyes fairly close together and equally distant, while the posterior eyes are equal among themselves, with the median eyes more distant from the lateral eyes than from each other.

== Ecology and behaviour ==
Agelena australis constructs a characteristic capture web consisting of a flat, slightly concave, non-adhesive silk sheet measuring 40–60 cm wide. The web is composed of a mesh of silk threads, suspended by oblique and vertical threads over the ground or horizontal surfaces.

The species feeds on a variety of crawling, jumping, and flying insects including beetles, grasshoppers, locusts, and termites. It serves as an important predator of harvester termites and locusts in its ecosystem.

== Conservation status ==
Agelena australis is classified as Least Concern due to its wide geographical range and lack of known threats. It has been recorded from several protected areas including the Karoo National Park, Tswalu Kalahari Reserve, and various other nature reserves.
