= Agelena satmila =

Scientific classification
- Kingdom: Animalia
- Phylum: Arthropoda
- Subphylum: Chelicerata
- Class: Arachnida
- Order: Araneae
- Infraorder: Araneomorphae
- Family: Agelenidae
- Genus: Agelena
- Species: A. satmila

Binomial name
- Agelena satmila Tikader, 1970

Species of spider

Agelena satmila is a species of spider in the family Agelenidae. It was first described by Tikader, in 1970. It is primarily found in India.
