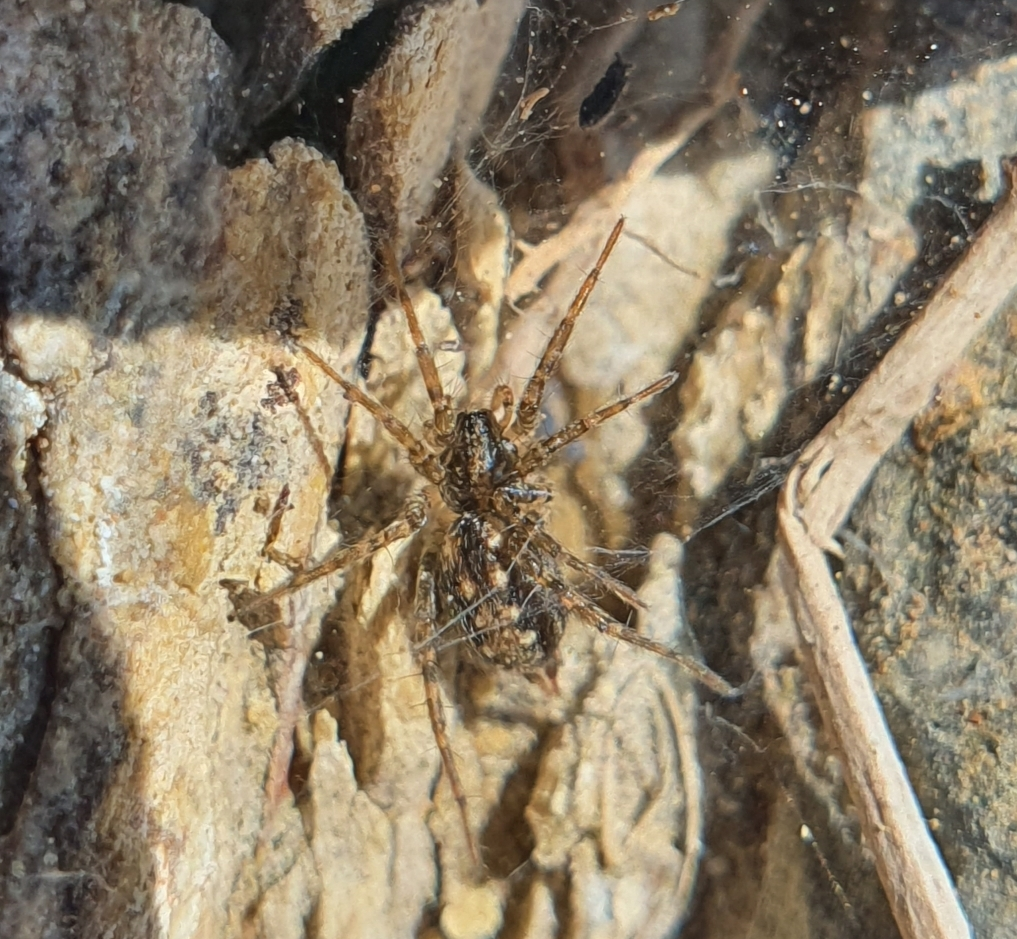

Scientific classification
- Kingdom: Animalia
- Phylum: Arthropoda
- Subphylum: Chelicerata
- Class: Arachnida
- Order: Araneae
- Infraorder: Araneomorphae
- Family: Agelenidae
- Genus: Mistaria
- Species: M. zuluana

Binomial name
- Mistaria zuluana (Roewer, 1955)

Synonyms
- Agelena zuluana Roewer, 1955

= Mistaria zuluana =

Zululand Agelena Grass Funnel-Web Spider

Species of spider

Mistaria zuluana is a species of spider in the family Agelenidae. It is endemic to South Africa. The species is commonly known as the Zululand Agelena Grass Funnel-Web Spider.

== Taxonomy ==
The species was originally described by Carl Friedrich Roewer in 1955 as Agelena zuluana from specimens collected in Zululand, near Ulundi. In 1967, Pekka T. Lehtinen suggested that the species probably belonged to the genus Mistaria. This transfer was formally completed by Kioko et al. in 2019 based on morphological analysis.

== Distribution ==
Mistaria zuluana is widespread in South Africa, occurring in six provinces. The species has been recorded from the Eastern Cape, KwaZulu-Natal, Limpopo, North West, Northern Cape, and Western Cape provinces at elevations ranging from 409 to 1,556 meters above sea level. Notable localities include several protected areas such as Addo Elephant National Park, Karoo National Park, Mountain Zebra National Park, and Augrabies Falls National Park.

== Habitat ==
Mistaria zuluana is a web-dwelling species that constructs funnel webs in low vegetation close to the soil surface. The species has been recorded from multiple biomes including Fynbos, Grassland, Nama Karoo, and Savanna.

== Description ==
Only the female of Mistaria zuluana is known. The total body length is approximately 6.8 mm, with the cephalothorax measuring 2.8 mm in length and 2.4 mm in width, and the opisthosoma 4.0 mm long and 2.4 mm wide.

The carapace is brownish-yellow with four pairs of black lateral bands and a dark brown cephalic region. The fovea is short. The chelicerae are dark brown, while the labium is yellow suffused with black and approximately three-quarters the length of the endites. The sternum is yellow with black suffusion, and the legs are creamy-yellow in coloration.

The opisthosoma is ovoid-shaped with two horizontal parallel black lines. The posterior spinnerets are yellow with black suffusion.

The epigyne has short, pointed teeth positioned at the same distance as the lateral notches. The anterior delimiting edge is concave but features a central ridge, and the copulatory ducts originate centrally and project anteriorly.

== Conservation status ==
Mistaria zuluana is classified as Least Concern due to its widespread distribution across South Africa. No specific threats to the species have been identified, and it is protected in at least 11 protected areas throughout its range.
