= Mistaria jumbo =

Scientific classification
- Kingdom: Animalia
- Phylum: Arthropoda
- Subphylum: Chelicerata
- Class: Arachnida
- Order: Araneae
- Infraorder: Araneomorphae
- Family: Agelenidae
- Genus: Mistaria
- Species: M. jumbo

Binomial name
- Mistaria jumbo (Strand, 1913)

Synonyms
- Agelena jumbo Strand, 1913

Species of spider

Mistaria jumbo, synonym Agelena jumbo, is a species of spider in the family Agelenidae. It was first described by Embrik Strand in 1913 as Agelena jumbo. It is native to the Democratic Republic of the Congo and Rwanda.
