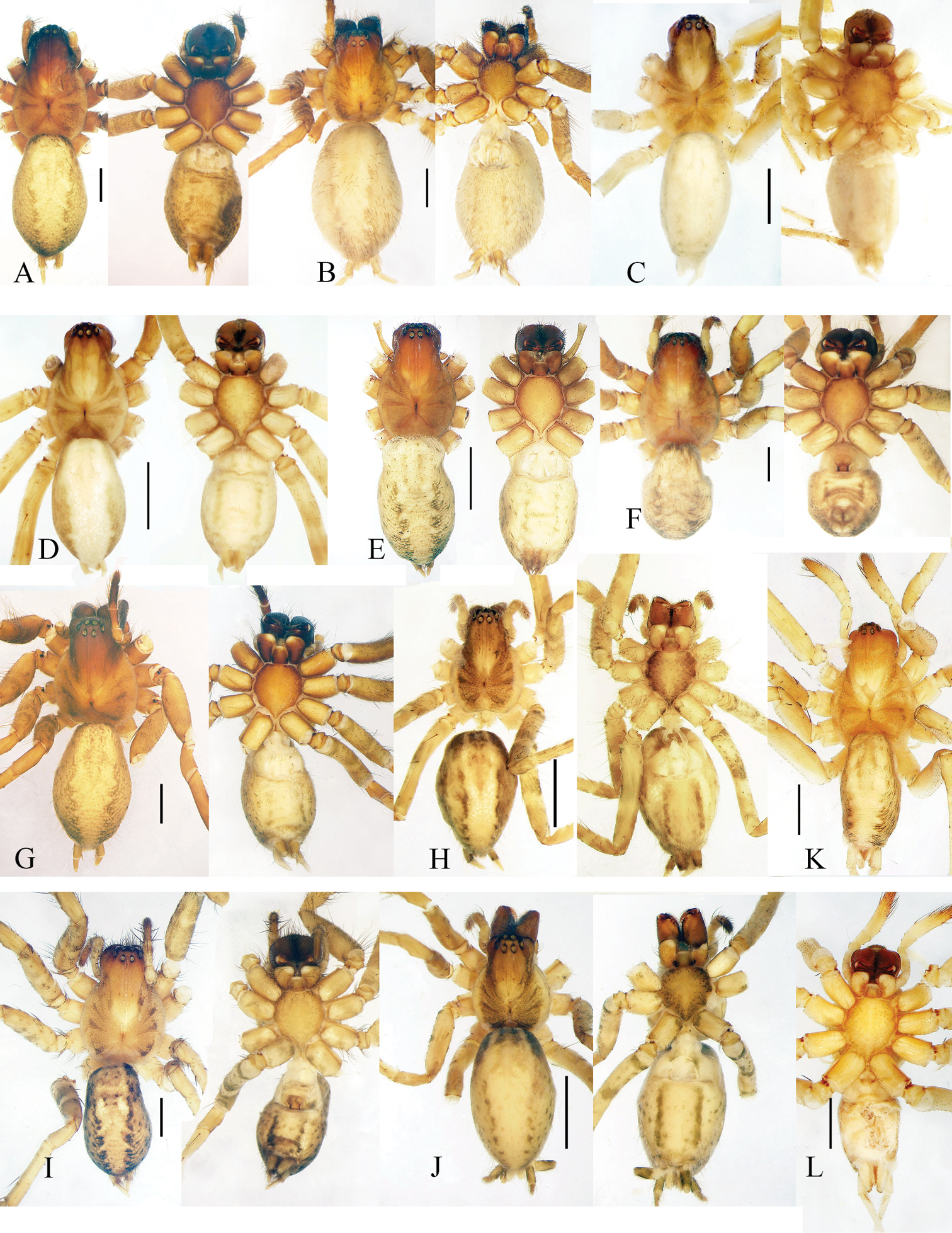
- Mistaria, first described by Pekka T. Lehtinen

Scientific classification
- Kingdom: Animalia
- Phylum: Arthropoda
- Subphylum: Chelicerata
- Class: Arachnida
- Order: Araneae
- Infraorder: Araneomorphae
- Family: Agelenidae
- Genus: Mistaria; Lehtinen, 1967

Type species
- M. leucopyga (Pavesi, 1883)

Species
- See text.

= Mistaria =

Genus of spiders

Mistaria is a genus of in the family Agelenidae (funnel weavers) first described by Pekka T. Lehtinen in 1967.

== Species ==
As of October 2026, the World Spider Catalog accepted the following species:

- Mistaria fagei (Caporiacco, 1949) – Kenya
- Mistaria jaundea (Roewer, 1955) – Cameroon
- Mistaria jumbo (Strand, 1913) – Democratic Republic of the Congo, Rwanda
- Mistaria keniana (Roewer, 1955) – Kenya
- Mistaria kiboschensis (Lessert, 1915) – Central and East Africa
- Mistaria kiwuensis (Strand, 1913) – Democratic Republic of the Congo
- Mistaria lawrencei (Roewer, 1955) – Zimbabwe
- Mistaria leucopyga (Pavesi, 1883) (type species) – Central and East Africa, Yemen
- Mistaria longimamillata (Roewer, 1955) – Mozambique
- Mistaria moschiensis (Roewer, 1955) – Tanzania
- Mistaria mossambica (Roewer, 1955) – Mozambique
- Mistaria nairobii (Caporiacco, 1949) – Central and East Africa
- Mistaria nyassana (Roewer, 1955) – Malawi
- Mistaria nyeupenyeusi G. M. Kioko & S. Q. Li, 2018 – Kenya
- Mistaria teteana (Roewer, 1955) – Mozambique
- Mistaria zorica (Strand, 1913) – Central and East Africa
- Mistaria zuluana (Roewer, 1955) – South Africa
