= Mistaria keniana =

Scientific classification
- Kingdom: Animalia
- Phylum: Arthropoda
- Subphylum: Chelicerata
- Class: Arachnida
- Order: Araneae
- Infraorder: Araneomorphae
- Family: Agelenidae
- Genus: Mistaria
- Species: M. keniana

Binomial name
- Mistaria keniana (Roewer, 1955)

Synonyms
- Agelena keniana Roewer, 1955

Species of spider

Mistaria keniana, synonym Agelena keniana, is a species of spider in the family Agelenidae. It was first described by Roewer in 1955 as Agelena keniana. It is native to Kenya.
