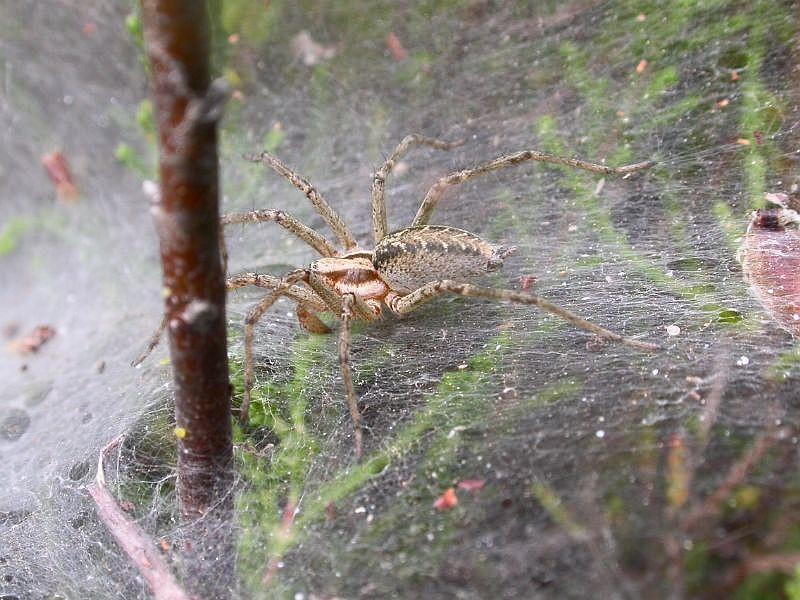
- A. labyrinthica
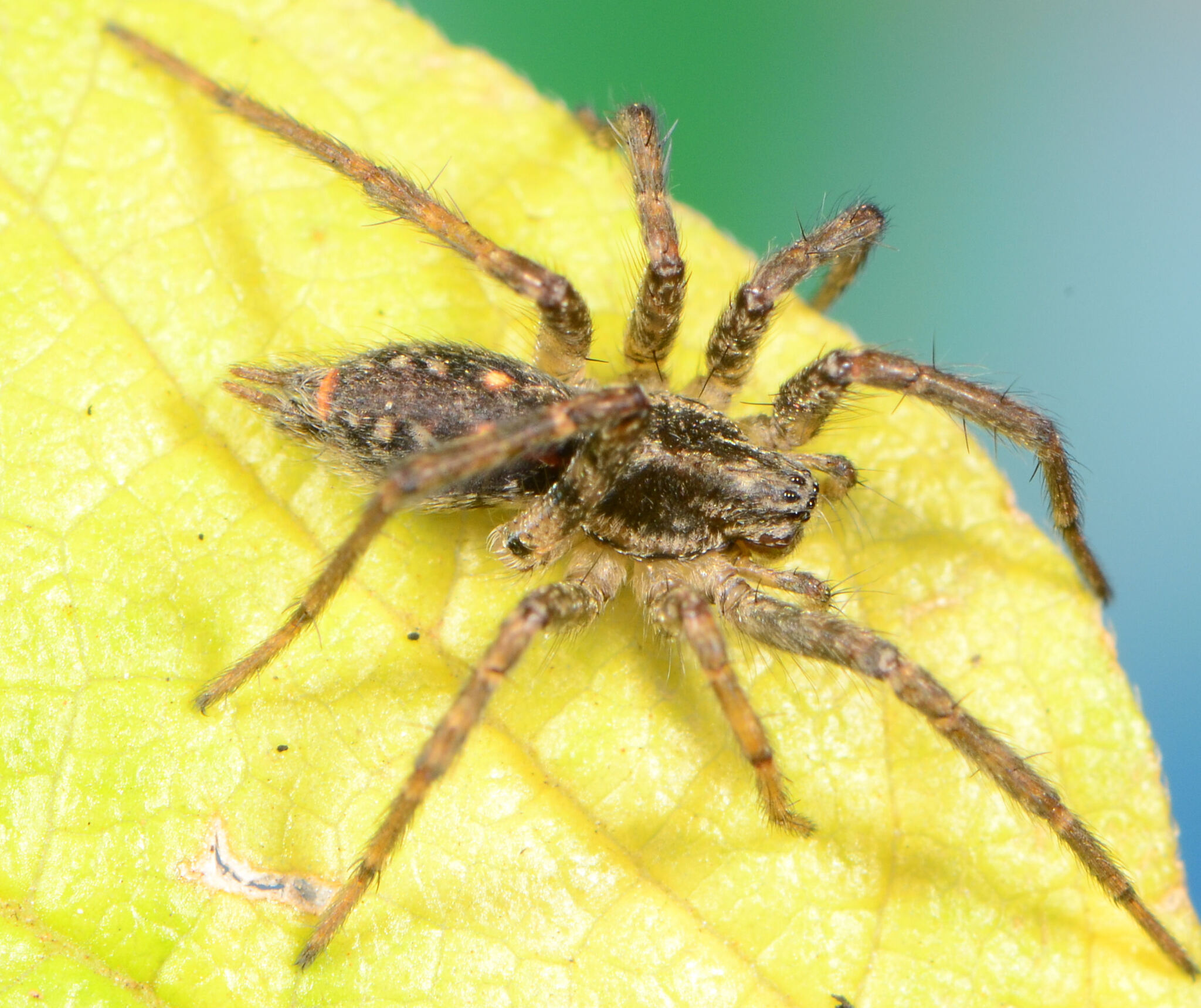
- female A. gaerdesi

Scientific classification
- Kingdom: Animalia
- Phylum: Arthropoda
- Subphylum: Chelicerata
- Class: Arachnida
- Order: Araneae
- Infraorder: Araneomorphae
- Family: Agelenidae
- Genus: Agelena; Walckenaer, 1805

Type species
- A. labyrinthica (Clerck, 1757)

Species
- 44, see text

= Agelena =

Agelena Temporal range: Palaeogene–present

Genus of spiders

Agelena is a genus of agelenid spiders first described by Charles Athanase Walckenaer in 1805. Sometimes referred to as Eurasian grass spiders, they trap their prey by weaving entangling non-sticky funnel webs. They are limited to the Old World, occurring from Africa to Japan. Many species have been moved to other genera, particularly to Allagelena, Benoitia and Mistaria. They range in body size from 6 to 10 millimeters, and typically construct their webs close to the soil surface within low vegetation.

== Life style ==
Agelena constructs a typical non-sticky funnel-web that features a flat open sheet-like area. The webs are usually positioned close to the soil surface within low vegetation. The capture web consists of a flat, slightly concave, non-adhesive silk sheet that measures 40-60 cm wide and is composed of a mesh of silken threads suspended by oblique and vertical threads. This sheet is laid over the ground or any horizontal area and is usually clearly visible in the early morning when it becomes covered with dewdrops. The web typically remains in the same location and is repaired and enlarged as the spider grows.

A funnel-shaped retreat is situated on one side of the web and usually has an exit at the other end, either under rocks or logs, in grass tussocks, and sometimes in abandoned animal burrows. The spider hides in the retreat with its front legs stretched out on the web to detect vibrations from prey that lands on it. Flying and jumping insects strike the vertical threads and drop onto the web, prompting the spider to rush out with great speed while running over the upper surface. The prey is grabbed, killed, and carried back into the retreat. When the spider feels threatened, it quickly disappears down the retreat and escapes through the other exit.

The female lays her eggs in a bottle-shaped egg sac, covers it with sand, and hangs it on one side of the retreat. Mating takes place during the summer months.

== Description ==
The body size of in Agelena ranges from 6 to 10 millimeters, with males being the same size as females but more slender and having longer legs.

The carapace is pear-shaped with a deep fovea and displays a greyish brown coloration marked by dark broad longitudinal bands. The eyes are positioned relatively close together in a grouped arrangement. The chelicerae are equipped with 3 promarginal and 3-4 retromarginal teeth.

The abdomen features a distinctive pattern that consists of a median band bordered by rows of spots, which frequently shows a reddish tint. The spinnerets are biarticulated, with the posterior pair having a distal segment that is much longer than the basal segment. The legs are hirsute and display banding, with the fourth pair being the longest and the third pair the shortest.

The male's palpus possesses patellar and tibial apophyses, while the embolus is short and thick with an elaborate conductor that is fused with a whitish, finger-like, fleshy outgrowth. The female's epigynum contains a deep central cavity that is partially divided by a median septum.

== Species ==
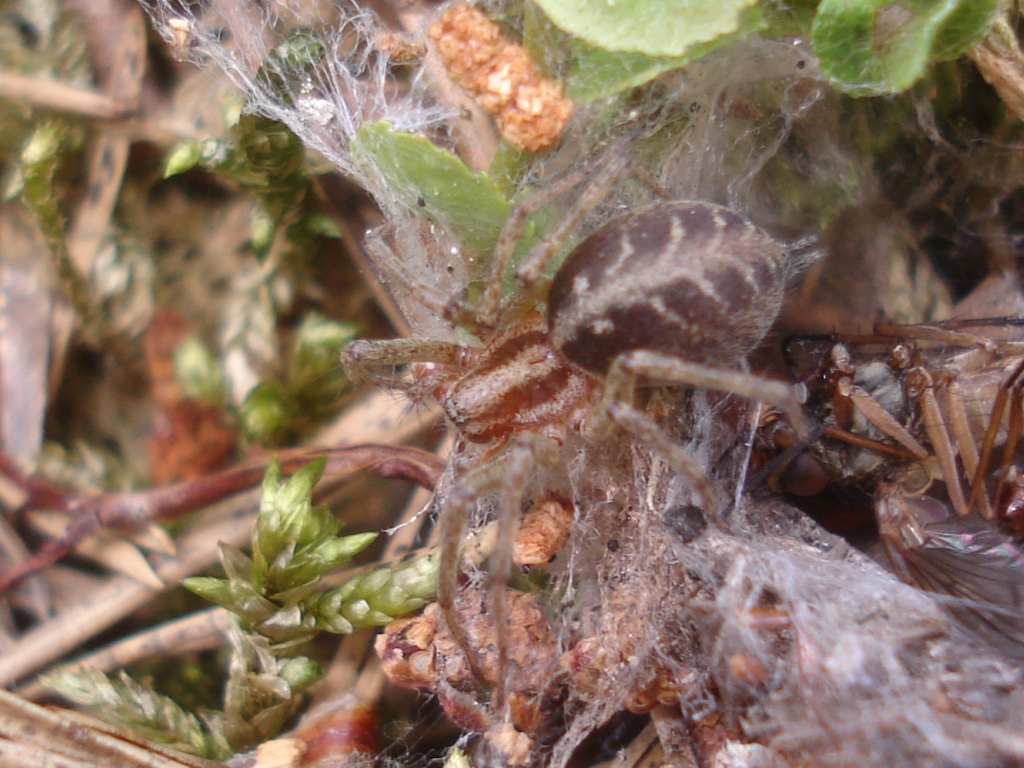
Agelena labyrinthica

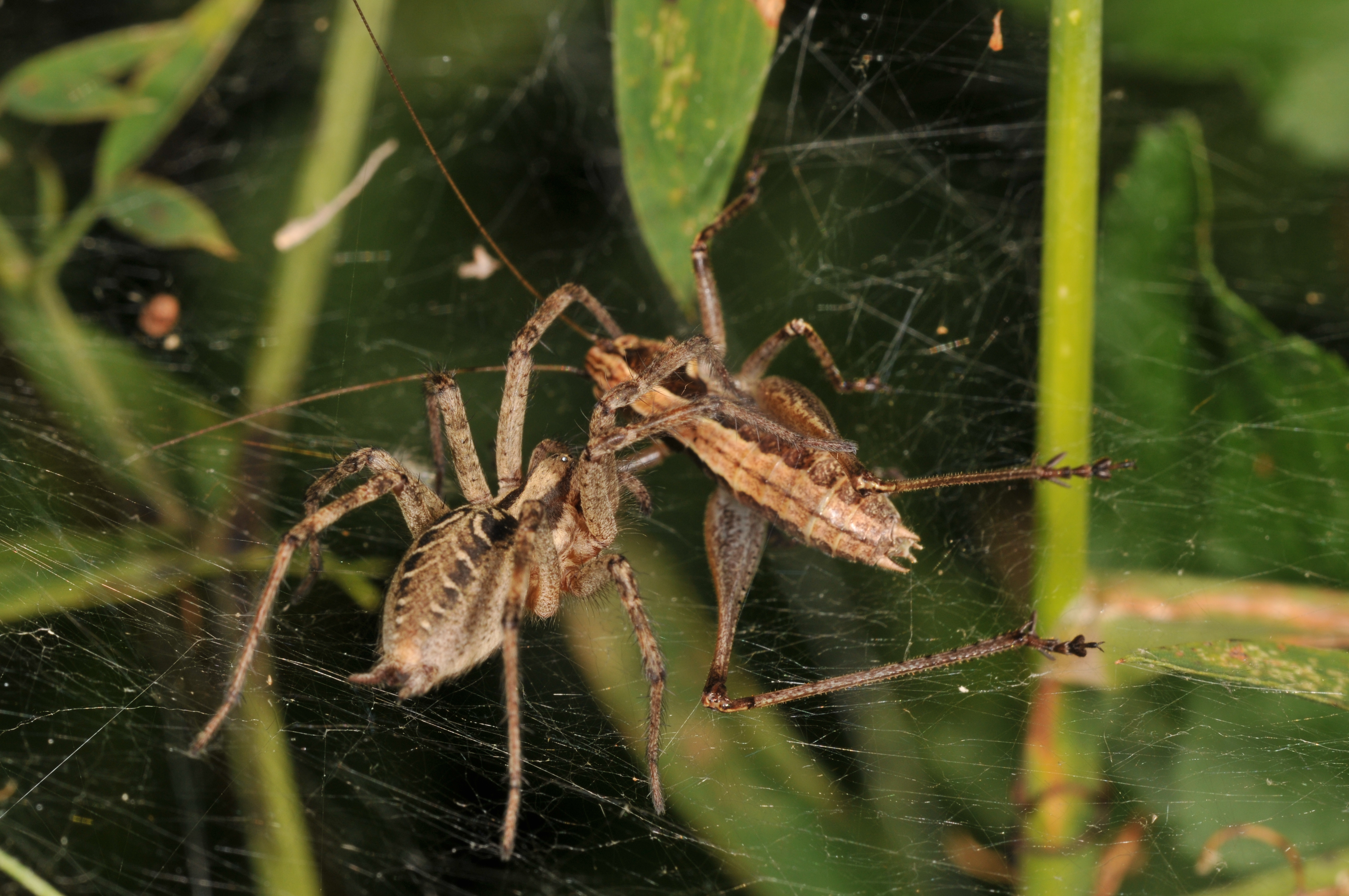
Agelena labyrinthica

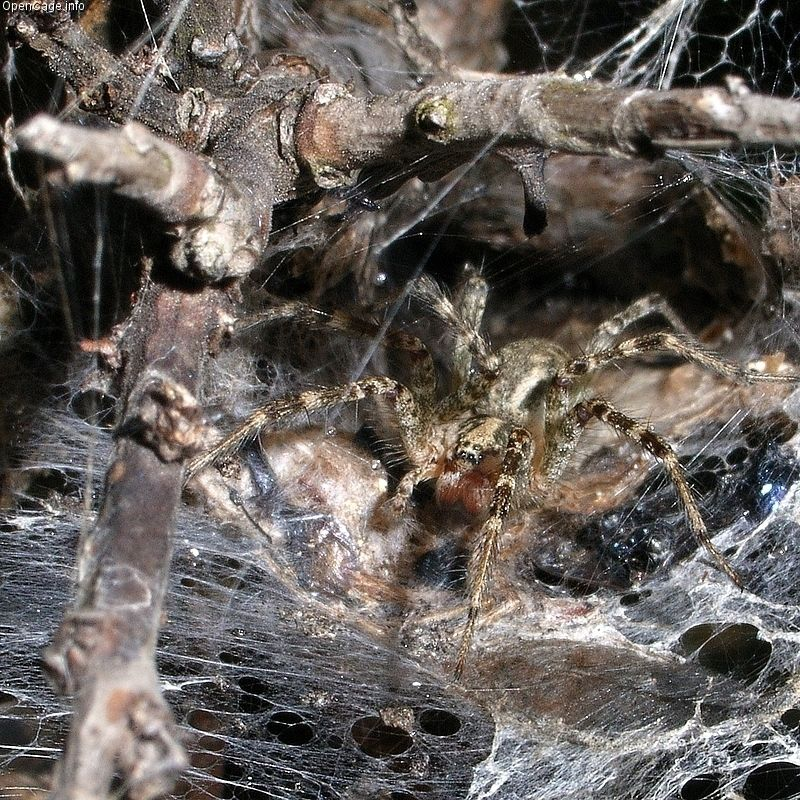
Agelena limbata

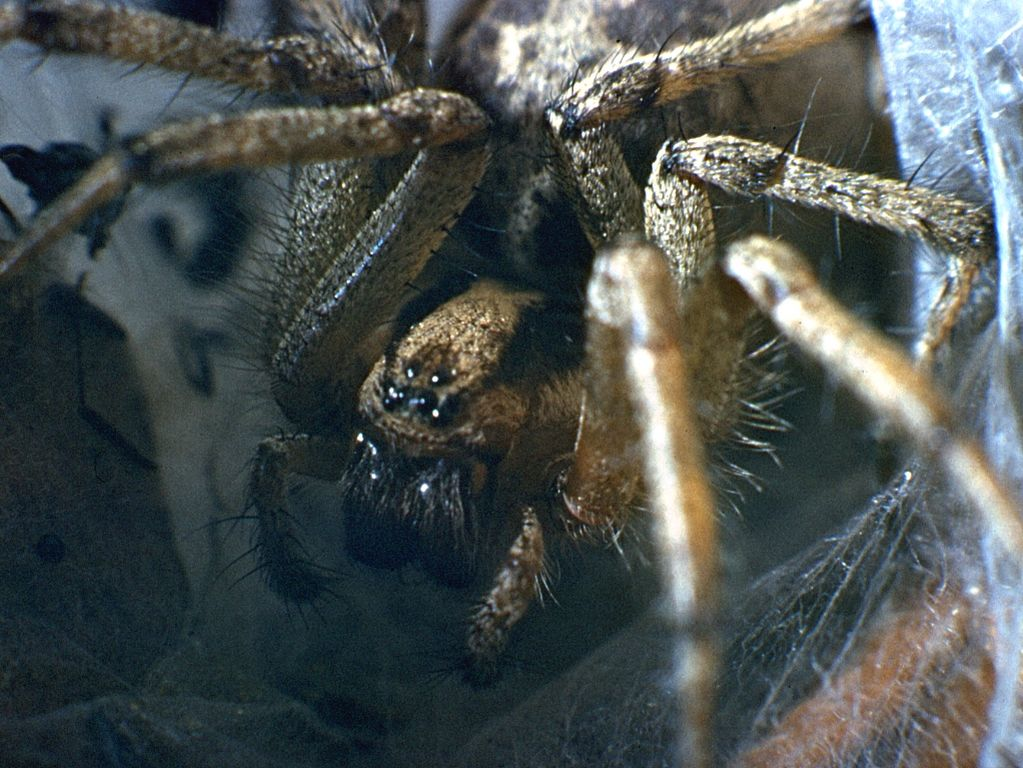
A. orientalis, female

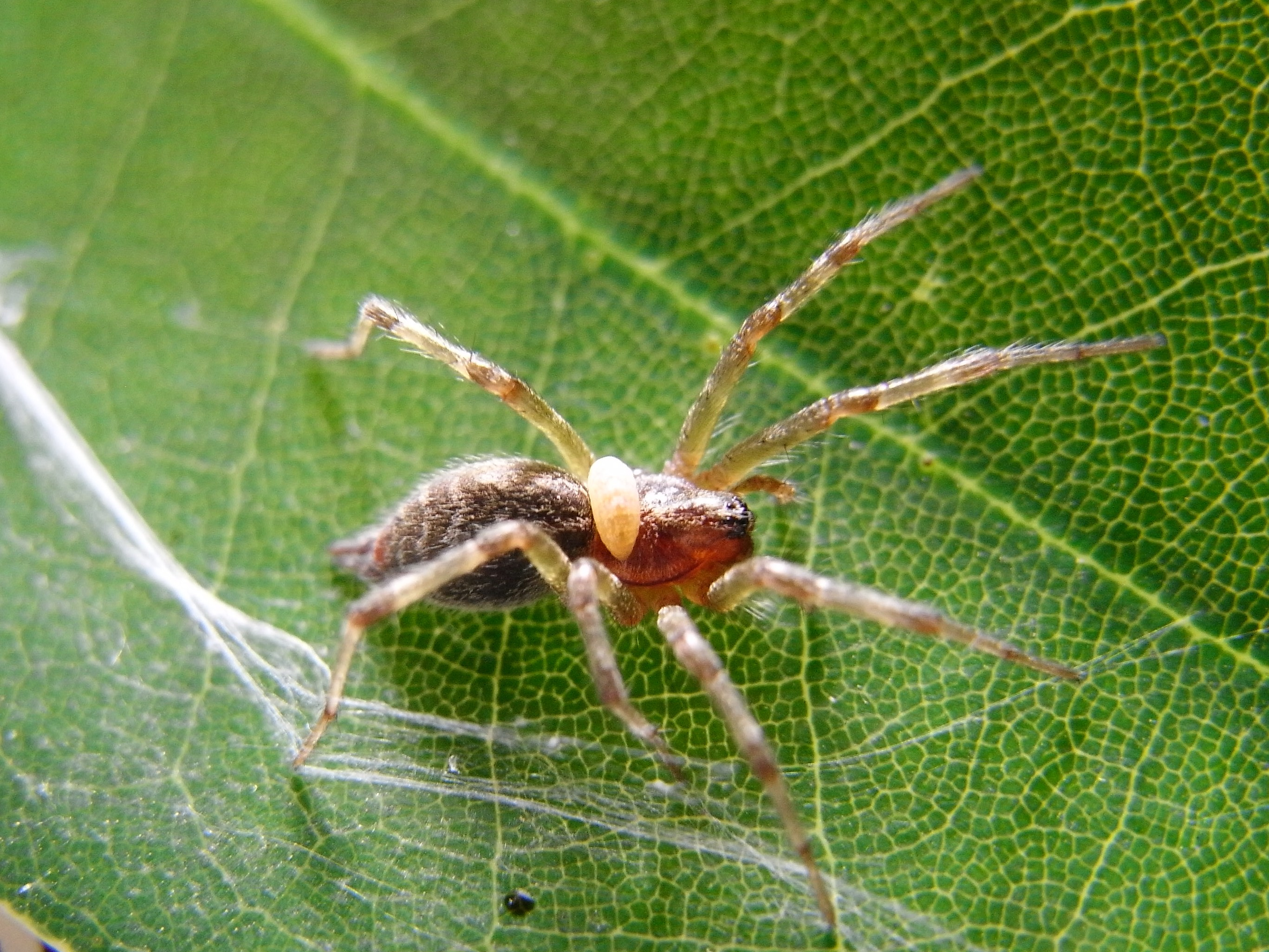
Agelena silvatica

As of October 2026, this genus includes forty species:

- Agelena annulipedella Strand, 1913 – Uganda, DR Congo
- Agelena atlantea Fage, 1938 – Morocco
- Agelena australis Simon, 1897 – Kenya, Namibia, Botswana, Zimbabwe, South Africa
- Agelena babai Tanikawa, 2005 – Japan
- Agelena barunae Tikader, 1970 – India
- Agelena chayu Zhang, Zhu & Song, 2005 – China
- Agelena choi Paik, 1965 – Korea
- Agelena consociata Denis, 1965 – Gabon
- Agelena cuspidata Zhang, Zhu & Song, 2005 – China
- Agelena doris Hogg, 1922 – Vietnam
- Agelena dubiosa Strand, 1908 – Ethiopia, Rwanda
- Agelena funerea Simon, 1909 – Ethiopia
- Agelena gaerdesi Roewer, 1955 – Namibia, Botswana, South Africa
- Agelena gautami Tikader, 1962 – India
- Agelena hirsutissima Caporiacco, 1940 – Ethiopia
- Agelena howelli Benoit, 1978 – Tanzania
- Agelena incertissima Caporiacco, 1939 – Ethiopia
- Agelena inda Simon, 1897 – India
- Agelena injuria Fox, 1936 – China
- Agelena jirisanensis Paik, 1965 – Korea
- Agelena labyrinthica (Clerck, 1757) – Europe, Central Asia, Mongolia, China, Korea, Japan (type species)
- Agelena limbata Thorell, 1897 – China, Myanmar, Laos
- Agelena lingua Strand, 1913 – Central Africa
- Agelena littoricola Strand, 1913 – Central Africa
- Agelena lukla Nishikawa, 1980 – Nepal, China
- Agelena maracandensis (Charitonov, 1946) – Central Asia
- Agelena nigra Caporiacco, 1940 – Ethiopia
- Agelena oaklandensis Barman, 1979 – India
- Agelena orientalis C. L. Koch, 1837 – Italy, Central Asia, Middle East, Iran
- Agelena poliosata Wang, 1991 – China
- Agelena republicana Darchen, 1967 – Gabon
- Agelena satmila Tikader, 1970 – India
- Agelena secsuensis Lendl, 1898 – China
- Agelena sherpa Nishikawa, 1980 – Nepal
- Agelena shillongensis Tikader, 1969 – India
- Agelena silvatica Oliger, 1983 – Russia (Far East), Korea, Japan, China, Taiwan
- Agelena suboculata Simon, 1910 – Botswana
- Agelena tenuella Roewer, 1955 – Cameroon
- Agelena tenuis Hogg, 1922 – Vietnam
- Agelena tungchis Lee, 1998 – Taiwan

=== Former species ===
Species formerly placed in the genus Agelena include:

- Agelena agelenoides Walckenaer, 1841 → Gorbiscape agelenoides
- Agelena borbonica Vinson, 1863 → Tegenaria domestica
- Agelena jaundea Roewer, 1955 → Mistaria jaundea
- Agelena jumbo Strand, 1913 → Mistaria jumbo
- Agelena keniana Roewer, 1955 → Mistaria keniana
- Agelena kiboschensis Lessert, 1915 → Mistaria kiboschensis
- Agelena lawrencei Roewer, 1955 → Mistaria lawrencei
- Agelena longimamillata Roewer, 1955 → Mistaria longimamillata
- Agelena mengei Lebert, 1877 (nomen dubium)
- Agelena moschiensis Roewer, 1955 → Mistaria moschiensis
- Agelena mossambica Roewer, 1955 → Mistaria mossambica
- Agelena nyassana Roewer, 1955 → Mistaria nyassana
- Agelena tadzhika Andreeva, 1976 → Benoitia tadzhika
- Agelena teteana Roewer, 1955 → Mistaria teteana
- Agelena zuluana Roewer, 1955 → Mistaria zuluana
