= Mistaria lawrencei =

Scientific classification
- Kingdom: Animalia
- Phylum: Arthropoda
- Subphylum: Chelicerata
- Class: Arachnida
- Order: Araneae
- Infraorder: Araneomorphae
- Family: Agelenidae
- Genus: Mistaria
- Species: M. lawrencei

Binomial name
- Mistaria lawrencei (Roewer, 1955)

Synonyms
- Agelena lawrencei Roewer, 1955

Species of spider

Mistaria lawrencei, synonym Agelena lawrencei, is a species of spider in the family Agelenidae. It was first described by Roewer in 1955 as Agelena lawrencei. It is native to Zimbabwe.
