= Mistaria jaundea =

Scientific classification
- Kingdom: Animalia
- Phylum: Arthropoda
- Subphylum: Chelicerata
- Class: Arachnida
- Order: Araneae
- Infraorder: Araneomorphae
- Family: Agelenidae
- Genus: Mistaria
- Species: M. jaundea

Binomial name
- Mistaria jaundea (Roewer, 1955)

Synonyms
- Agelena jaundea Roewer, 1955

Species of spider

Mistaria jaundea, synonym Agelena jaundea, is a species of spider in the family Agelenidae. It was first described by Roewer in 1955 as Agelena jaundea. It is native to Cameroon.
