= Agelenopsis pennsylvanica =

Scientific classification
- Kingdom: Animalia
- Phylum: Arthropoda
- Subphylum: Chelicerata
- Class: Arachnida
- Order: Araneae
- Infraorder: Araneomorphae
- Family: Agelenidae
- Genus: Agelenopsis
- Species: A. pennsylvanica

Binomial name
- Agelenopsis pennsylvanica (C. L. Koch, 1843)

Species of spider

Agelenopsis pennsylvanica, commonly known as the Pennsylvania funnel-web spider or the Pennsylvania grass spider, is a species of spider in the family Agelenidae. The common name comes from the place that it was described, Pennsylvania, and the funnel shape of its web. Its closest relative is Agelenopsis potteri.

Agelenopsis pennsylvanica lives primarily as a solitary spider across the United States, having been found in at least 21 different states. It is an ambush predator, sitting and waiting for prey in its funnel-shaped web. In this species, the female commonly cannibalizes the male during mating. This small species has been used to study pre-copulatory cannibalism, boldness, aggressive foraging behavior, and the influence of microbes in the reproductive cycle and mating behavior.

== Description ==
=== Coloring ===
The coloration of A. pennsylvanica is more visible in its carapace. The carapace has dark markings that are often faded. The sternum is typically a yellow-orange color with a large dark V-shaped mark, which at the posterior point is black; in darker individuals, the sternum is all black. The abdomen follows the same pattern described above, but this is somewhat obscured on dark individuals; sides speckled, venter pales on sides, broad median area dusky black.

=== Size ===
The bodies of females are 9 to 14 mm long, while those of males are 7 to 12 mm long. The body size of A. pennsylvanica is extremely variable, particularly in females, ranging from 6.70 to 17.00 mm. Eye size is unequal in Agelenopsis: the anterior median eyes are the largest while the posterior median are the smallest. The anterior eyes are less than a radius apart while the posterior eyes are equidistant, posterior median eyes are closer to each other than to the side eyes, usually less than a diameter apart. The fang groove of chelicerae has 3 or 4 teeth on the hind margin. Hind spinnerets with an apical segment about twice as long as a basal segment. The epigynum of A. pennsylvanica has a deep transverse opening with a complex internal structure. The fertilization duct in this spider genus is long and slender, and coils around the neck of the bursa one and a half to two and a half times before opening the oviduct. The males' palpus is a single large lobed process on the ectal side of the tibia.

==== Females ====
The adult female Pennsylvania funnel-web spider has an overall length from 9.35 to 14.00 mm. Its carapace width is around 2.38 to 4.88 mm by 1.32 to 2.65 mm at its widest and narrowest points, respectively. Female spiders of this species have a skull-shape bursa opening with spermathecae tending to nestle one above the other rather than positioned side by side; this whole structure is part of the female's genital region. In females, the first and fourth tibia-patella lengths range from 3.70 to 8.00 mm and 4.10 to 8.35 mm, respectively.

==== Males ====
The length of an adult male can range from 7.64 to 12.82 mm, while its carapace is 2.55 to 4.50 mm wide at its widest point and 1.54 to 2.25 mm at its narrowest point. The male of this species distinguishes itself from other males of the genus by its coiling embolus. The male's embolus makes a full circle with a pointed tip positioned perpendicular to cymbium; the cymbium is a feature of the palpal bulb characteristic of the male's pedipalp. The length of the first tibia-patella in males ranges from 5.70 to 9.00 mm while the length of the fourth tibia-patella ranges from 6.00 to 9.00 mm.

== Distribution and habitat ==
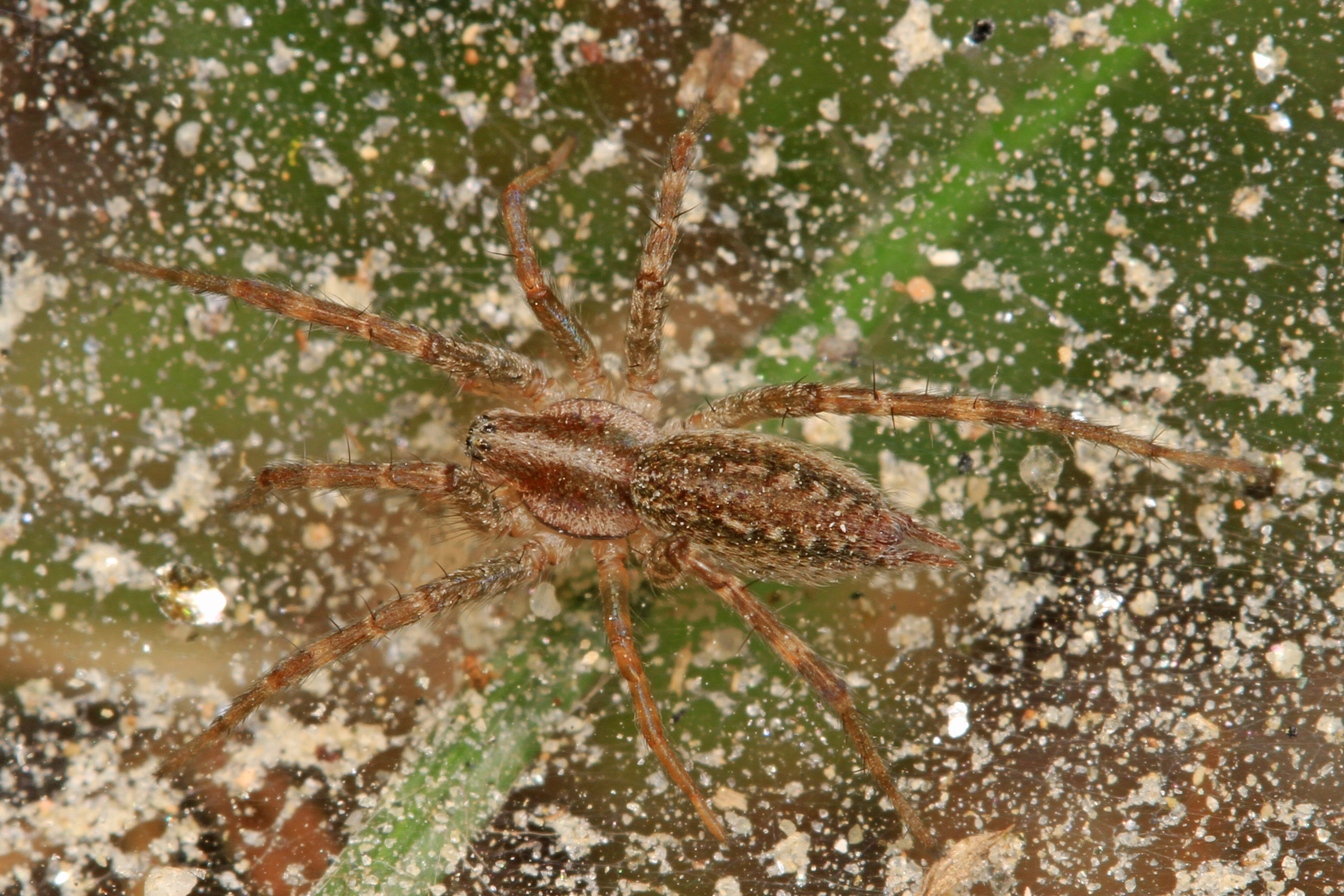
Agelenopsis pennsylvanica in its open grassy habitat

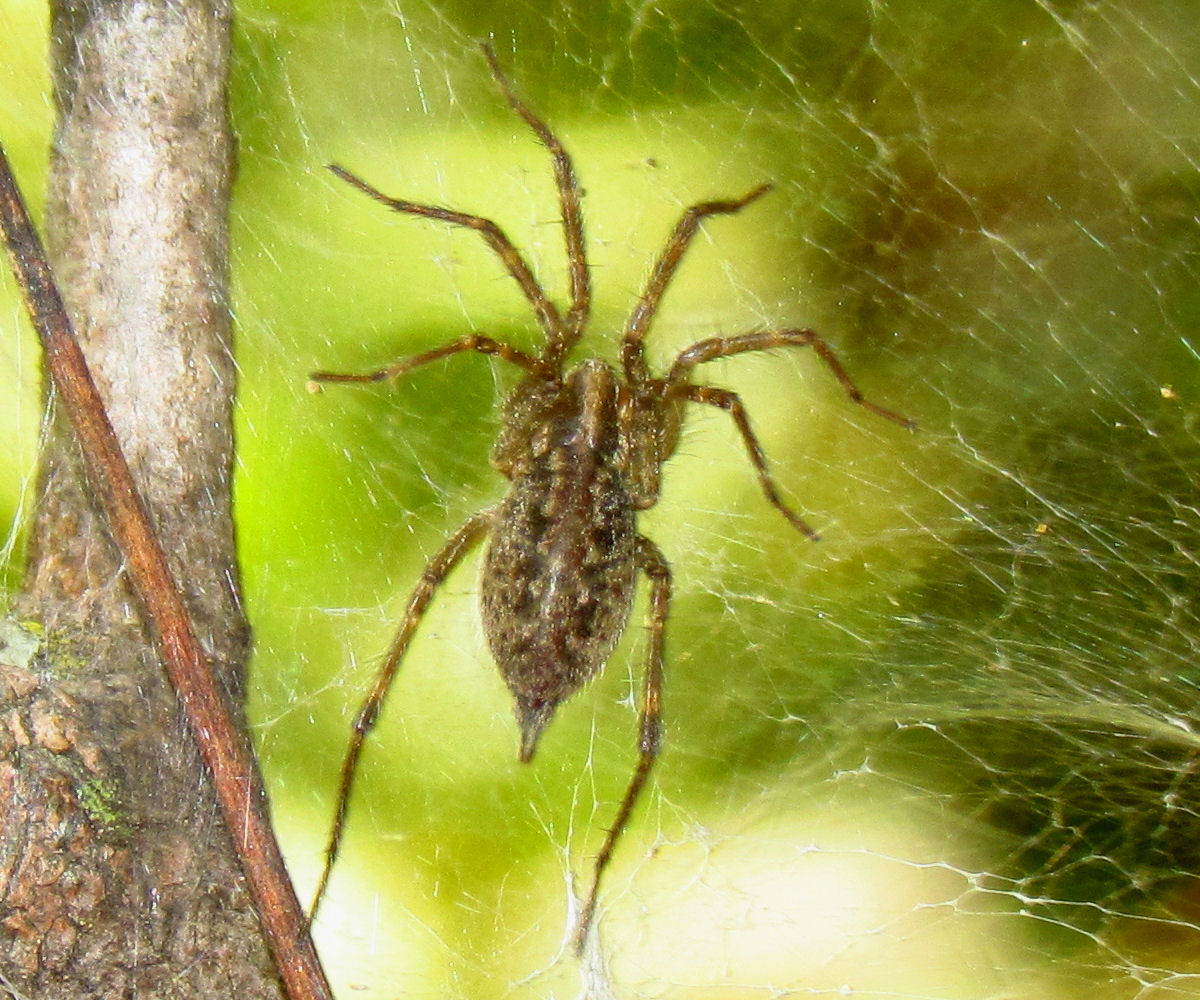
Agelenopsis pennsylvanica and its web

=== Distribution ===
A. pennsylvanica is widespread across the United States, in the states of Colorado, Connecticut, Idaho, Illinois, Kansas, Louisiana, Massachusetts, Michigan, North Dakota, Ohio, Oregon, Pennsylvania, Tennessee, Utah, and West Virginia. However, it has been reported to be most common from New England and Great Lakes states, westward into Nebraska and eastern Colorado, south to Arkansas, Mississippi, and northern Georgia, with disjunct populations in Washington and Oregon.

=== Habitat ===
This species is usually found in open grassy habitats. It is believed that this species’ range is correlated with areas of high-water availability. In this type of ecosystem (floodplains forest and habitat near to bodies of water), spiders of this species are more common, indicating that humidity is important for its distribution.

== Diet and feeding behavior ==
=== Diet ===
Adult Agelenopsis pennsylvanica spiders feed on a variety of insects, particularly, hemipterans (true bugs), homopterans (Homoptera, a suborder of Hemiptera), coleopterans (beetles), hymenopterans (bees, ants, wasps and sawflies), dipterans (true flies), and orthopterans (grasshoppers, locusts and crickets).

=== Feeding behavior ===
When the spider is on its web, it sits and waits at the entrance of their funnel, using high-velocity movements to subdue prey that make contact with their webs. After the prey fall into the web, the spider runs out to capture the prey.

== Reproduction and life cycle ==
This funnel-web spider develops personality traits. Boldness and foraging aggression in juvenile stages of development can be observed in tests. Boldness and aggressive behaviors are correlated with the penultimate instar stage of juvenile development in wild A. pennsylvanica spiders, but there is no correlation when the juveniles are reared in the laboratory. It has also been found that the boldness and foraging aggressiveness behaviors of juvenile spiders that are field-caught are a phenotypic plasticity response, which is driven by the environmental conditions where they live and that do not exist in a laboratory. The boldness and foraging aggressiveness behavior occur only under particular environmental conditions. This behavior is not correlated with selection.

=== Courtship ritual ===
In the species' courtship ritual, the male traverses the female's web, tapping the silk as to signal his presence. He then moves slowly toward the female, at which point he takes hold of her and initiates courtship. The terminal insertion of the copulation ritual involves the male cleaning his palpi and walking away from the cataleptic female. The male then runs for a few seconds, stopping to clean his emboli. Once the female awakens, she begins to groom herself by drawing her legs between her chelicerae and brushing them over her body.

=== Mating ===
A. pennsylvanica reaches its sexual maturity from late August to September. Females produced egg sacs in October and November and stay with them until they die. The egg sacs of A. pennsylvanica resemble the Agelenopsis naevia eggsacs – a large conical egg sac, in which the egg mass is enclosed in a thin, silk sac covered by a substantial layer of debris encased in silk (the eggs are still susceptible to parasites). The number of eggs in an egg sac is highly variable from 18 to 236 eggs. In A. pennsylvanica several females are usually found under tree bark such that the egg masses were touching each other or even overlapping.

==== Interspecies mating ====
It has been suggested that A. pennsylvanica and A. oklahoma could potentially engage in interspecific copulation. This idea was supported for the following reasons: 1) both species attain their sexual maturity during the same period; 2) even though A. oklahoma is smaller than A. pennsylvanica, individuals of the same size have the potential to copulate; 3) both species have similar color patterns and morphologies; 4) both species have similar copulatory behavior patterns; and 5) morphologically speaking, there are no mechanical incompatibilities between these two species to prevent cross mating. However, there is no evidence that interspecific mating between A. pennsylvanica and A. oklahoma actually occurs. Both species display a mutual indifference toward each other, and in few cases, one attacks the other, which usually culminats in the death and consumption of one of the spiders. Mechanical incompatibilities of A. pennsylvanica males may prevent them from successfully mating with females of some other agelenopsid species; this mechanism is termed the "lock-and-key" concept.

=== Sexual cannibalism ===
Sexual cannibalism is an extreme case of sexual conflict in nature because one of the parties loses its reproductive potential. The females and her offspring of this species benefit when a cannibalistic behavior takes place during copulation. Particularly, the eggs produced by females that sexually cannibalize the male are heavier and have a higher hatching success than those eggs laid by females that did not cannibalize their mate. Studies have shown that females of this species that attacked their prey more rapidly are more likely to cannibalize their first male before copulation. This was found to be especially true of those females that spent long periods of time with no food. The results of this study suggest that sexual cannibalism in females is caused by general aggressiveness and by their hunger state. Aggressive behavior thus favors the reproductive performance of the females. Research has shown that the authors found that females were approached by zero to three males during their two to three weeks of the reproductive season. In this spider species cannibalism has two major advantages for the female: 1) improved reproductive output and fecundity; and 2) increased attractiveness to males.

In 2013, Kralj-Fišer and colleagues studied the aggressive spillover hypothesis (ASH) and its involvement in pre-copulatory sexual cannibalism. The authors argued that ASH “posits that pre-copulatory cannibalism represents a spillover of female aggressiveness from the juvenile foraging context, when aggressiveness is advantageous, to the adult context, when aggressiveness may be non-adaptive or maladaptive”. They found that in A. pennsylvanica the pre-copulatory cannibalism cannot be explained by ASH alone. Cannibalism occurred in 36% of all the virgin females, but none of the females killed two males in succession – they killed the first male and copulated with the second. This result, in conjunction with Berning and colleagues’ findings (i.e., the aggressiveness of females increase with starvation) suggests that pre-copulatory cannibalism is the result of both – ASH and the foraging strategy. Additionally, Kralj-Fišer and colleagues found that virgin female spiders that consumed the first potential mate prior to copulation, exhibited increased reproductive success: “they gleaned more offspring from heavier egg sacs”. This demonstrates that pre-copulatory sexual cannibalism has adaptive consequences that are the result of multiple mechanisms acting in concert.

==== Sexual coevolution in males ====
The female's receptivity to male mates depends upon her temperament. More aggressive females are more likely to cannibalize a potential mate. The male uses his pedipalps to transfer the sperm to the females. Also, the male uses his pedipalps during the courtship stridulation or as a visual signal for other spiders. After courtship, a key part of the mating sequence called catalepsis occurs. In catalepsis, the male subdues the female with pheromones to induce a quiescent state in the female before copulation. When mating is finished, the male departs the web before the female awakens to avoid sexual cannibalism. Male spiders have been shown to be more attracted to females that have already eaten another male. As females typically eat only one male, this strategy may aid male survival.

== Web ==
=== Web type ===
All members of the Agelenopsis genus make a funnel-shaped web, as their common name states. The web of this spider is usually found on the ground, in understory vegetation and trees in the forest, and in old field lawns. In some seasons, it is very common in and around houses.

=== Prey capture techniques ===
These funnel-webs are composed of two parts: 1) a non-sticky sensory sheet used to sense the prey; and 2) a funnel retreat, in which they sit and wait at the entrance of their funnel for prey to fall into the trap.

=== Construction ===
The funnel web of this spider is a concave silk sheet with a variable number of aerial threads above, designed to capture flying insects and anchor the web to surrounding vegetation. This kind of web usually has two ends: on one edge is an extended funnel which terminates in a sheltered location, while at the other end of the web the spider is located with the first two pairs of legs resting in the nest. This enables the spider to quickly react to a potential predator or prey. Members of the genus Agelenopsis rely on high burst speeds to capture prey, thus capitalizing on foraging opportunities. If this high burst is compromised – as would be expected from pathogenic infection – the locomotor performance ability of this spider is going to be reduced. This can result in reduction of the spider's ability to forage and defend their territory from intruding conspecifics.

== Enemies ==
=== Predators ===
This species has been found in other spiders’ webs such as Parasteatoda tepidariorum (the Common house spider) and Phidippus audax (the Bold jumper).

== Mutualism with microbes ==
=== Microbes in mating ===
Environmental microbes have been found to play a critical role in courtship behavior, female survival, and mating dynamics of A. pennsylvanica. During copulation, it is possible for the male to transmit environmental microbes to the female via the seminal fluid, therefore, copulation can alter the composition of the female microbiota. In a study by Spicer and colleagues in 2019, the authors found that when either the male or female of A. pennsylvanica is exposed to environmental microbes, their mating behavior, fecundity, and survivorship are altered. This study observed that when females were exposed to bacteria, males took four times longer to begin courtship and males began courtship sooner with aggressive females once they were paired with them. When males were exposed to bacteria, their mating females were observed to experience reduced survival. Additionally, courtship was not altered in those males and females that were exposed to antibiotics. Two non-mutually exclusive hypotheses to explain the delay in courtship behavior when females are exposed to bacteria were suggested: 1) males may detect the bacterial load of their partner and adjust their behavior, or 2) females may reduce their sexual receptivity when they perceive an increase in their bacterial load, delaying courtship initiation by males. However, it is thought that males are more likely to initiate the courtship process based on assessments of female receptivity. In the particular case in which the males initiate courtship more quickly when the females are more aggressive and have been exposed to bacteria, the authors suggest that males minimized the time that they were exposed to the female to avoid a possible cannibalistic event, and therefore survived to reproduce once again.

=== Microbe Studies ===
Even though A. pennsylvanica is known for its solitary behavior, spiders can share the cuticular microbiota via a shared environment (e.g., silk or soil) or during interaction with conspecifics (e.g., antagonistic interaction). Parks and colleagues study the relationship between the grass species A. pennsylvanica and bacteria collected from their cuticles in situ. They found that exposure to Dermacoccus nishinomiyaensis and Staphylococcus saprophyticus decrease the foraging aggressiveness of spiders toward prey in their web.

Parks and colleagues focused their research on three host behavioral traits: boldness, aggressiveness, and activity level. They found that the cuticular microbiota alters the behavior of the spider. Consequently, there was no evidence to suggest that cuticular bacterial load was harmful to spiders, at least in terms of survival rates. 9 bacteria collected from spiders’ cuticles were common environmental bacteria found in soil, water, or plant surfaces, which can be easily acquired when the spider is moving around their habitat, during dispersal, web construction, foraging, and mating. Two pathogenic cuticular bacteria were found: 1) Serratia marcescens is widespread in arthropods and was found in two spiders, and 2) Pseudomonas aeruginosa was found in two spiders, as well as having confirmed pathogenicity in wolf spiders. Rochel Gilbert and George W. Uetz in 2016 found that Pseudomonas aeruginosa was horizontally transmitted during mating. This finding, along with Parks and colleagues finding, suggest that the contact between conspecifics during mating, parental care, or territorial interactions drives the transmission of pathogenic and benign environmental microbes among, and between spiders and the ecosystem.

Additionally, Parks and colleagues found that two common soil bacteria – D. nishinomiyaensis and S. saprophyticus – were associated with over a 10-fold decrease in spiders’ foraging aggressiveness toward prey. Spiders that were exposed to these two bacteria took 60 seconds longer to attack their prey. The mechanism used by these bacteria that causes a delay in spider predatory behavior is still unknown. However, the reduction in foraging aggressiveness can have fitness consequences for the individual in situ. Individuals infected with these bacteria are less likely to capture prey. The bodily entrance pathway for this cuticular bacteria could leave the spider vulnerable with a compromised immune system.

== Physiology ==
In 1976, James E. Carrel and R. D. Heathcote studied the heart rate in spiders and how it was influenced by body size and foraging energetics. In spiders, the heart is sensitive to locomotory activity, unlike other organisms. The blood serves both mechanical and respiratory functions. Blood is used as a hydrostatic fluid to extend the spider's appendages – compounded by extensor muscles in some leg joints. The antagonistic musculature common in other groups (e.g., insect, crustaceans, and vertebrates) is incomplete in spiders. Spiders present a neurogenic heartbeat. Understanding the relationship between the heartbeat and the size of the spider may help to explain their predatory or sedentary behavior. James E. Carrel and R. D. Heathcote found that in web weaver spiders – Filistata hibernalis, Argiope aurantia, Eriophora sp., Neoscona arabesca, and Agelenopsis pennsylvanica – there is a negative relationship between body weight and heart rate. These spiders weigh as much as jumping spiders, but their heart rates resemble the tarantula's heart rate. This suggests that there is an energy-conserving adaptation in which these spiders invest little effort in prey capture and, consequently, feed only occasionally.

== Venom ==
McKeown and colleagues study the bite of different spider species in Oregon (USA) to understand the harm that the venom could have on humans. The researchers used verified spider bites to determine the symptoms of bites by A. pennsylvanica. During experimentation, patients were told to place the spider that had bit them in a container and subsequently, to send it to the Oregon Poison Control Center. The patients were contacted by phone during the next 1 to 3 weeks after the bites occurred, looking for symptoms. The bites from "A. pennsylvanica" were determined to cause itching, swelling, and redness in the area that was bitten, in some cases some patients presented back pain. The symptoms from bites from A. pennsylvanica can last from 1 day up to 10 days.
