= William Albert Locy =

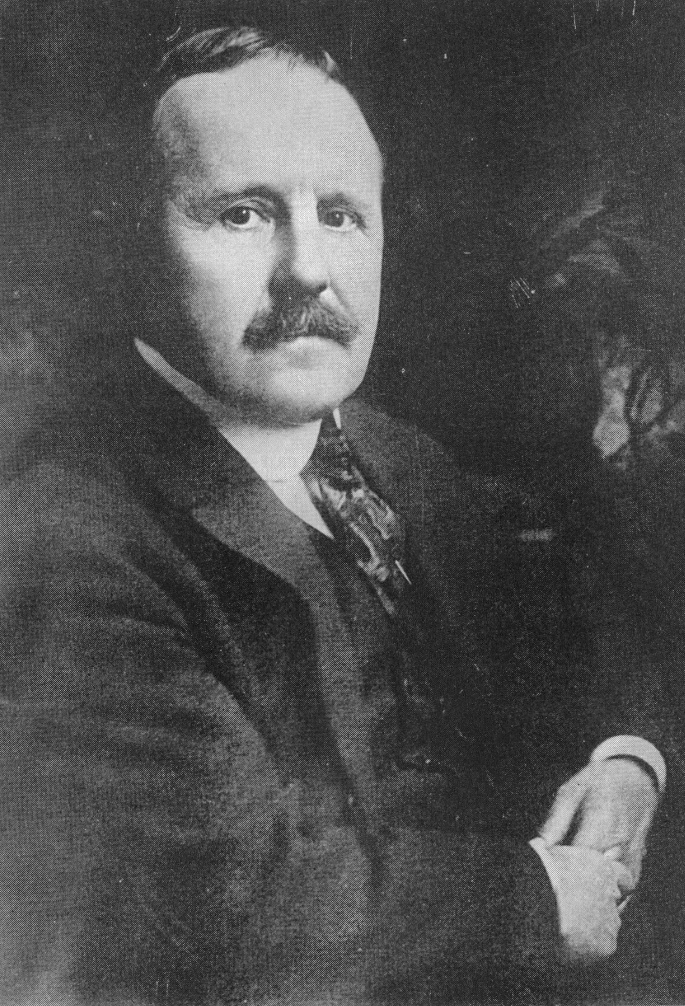
- Born: 14 September 1857; Troy, Michigan
- Died: 9 October 1924 (aged 67)

William Albert Locy (14 September 1857 – 9 October 1924) was an American biologist who served as a professor of zoology at Northwestern University where he was known from his teaching and lucid writing. He contributed to textbooks of biology and also studied and wrote on the history of biology.

== Life and work ==
Locy was born in Troy, Michigan, the son of Lorenzo Dow and Sarah Kingsbury. His paternal ancestors (including Cornelis Loyse) were Dutch settlers who had moved to Dutchess county, New York in 1651. He graduated from the University of Michigan in 1881, and received a master's degree in 1884. His master's thesis was on the anatomy of the water scorpion. He taught at the normal school in St. Cloud Minnesota from 1885 and moved to Minneapolis the next year. In 1887 he moved to Lake Forest College in Illinois, serving as a professor of physiology at Rush Medical College, Chicago in 1891. He taught for a while in Mt. Morris College, Illinois. His colleagues included Fernando Sanford and Jeremiah W. Jenks. He worked in Harvard in 1884-85 on embryology in Agelena naevia in the laboratory of Edward Laurens Mark. In 1887 he became chair of biology at Lake Forest University studying the embryonic development of elasmobranchs. For his work on the development of the vertebrate head, he received a doctorate under C. O. Whitman from the University of Chicago in 1895. In 1891 he visited Berlin studying physiology and attended the lectures of Emil du Bois-Reymond. In 1896 he succeeded E.G. Conklin as professor or biology at the Northwestern University. He was a trustee of the Marine Biological Laboratory from 1901 to 1903. He was made president of the section on the history of science when it was created by the American Association for the Advancement of Science. He spent several months at the zoological station in Naples from 1902. In 1906, he received an honorary Sc.D. from the University of Michigan. In 1915 he presided over the AAAS. He served as a professor at Northwestern until his death.

Locy took a special interest in the evolution of the sense organs and in embryology. He was also keenly interested in the history of biology and zoology. His book Biology and its Makers (1908) was translated to German and went into three editions. He also wrote The Main Currents of Zoology (1918) and The Story of Biology (1925). Locy married Ellen, daughter of Dr Joseph Eastment of Flint. They had three children.
