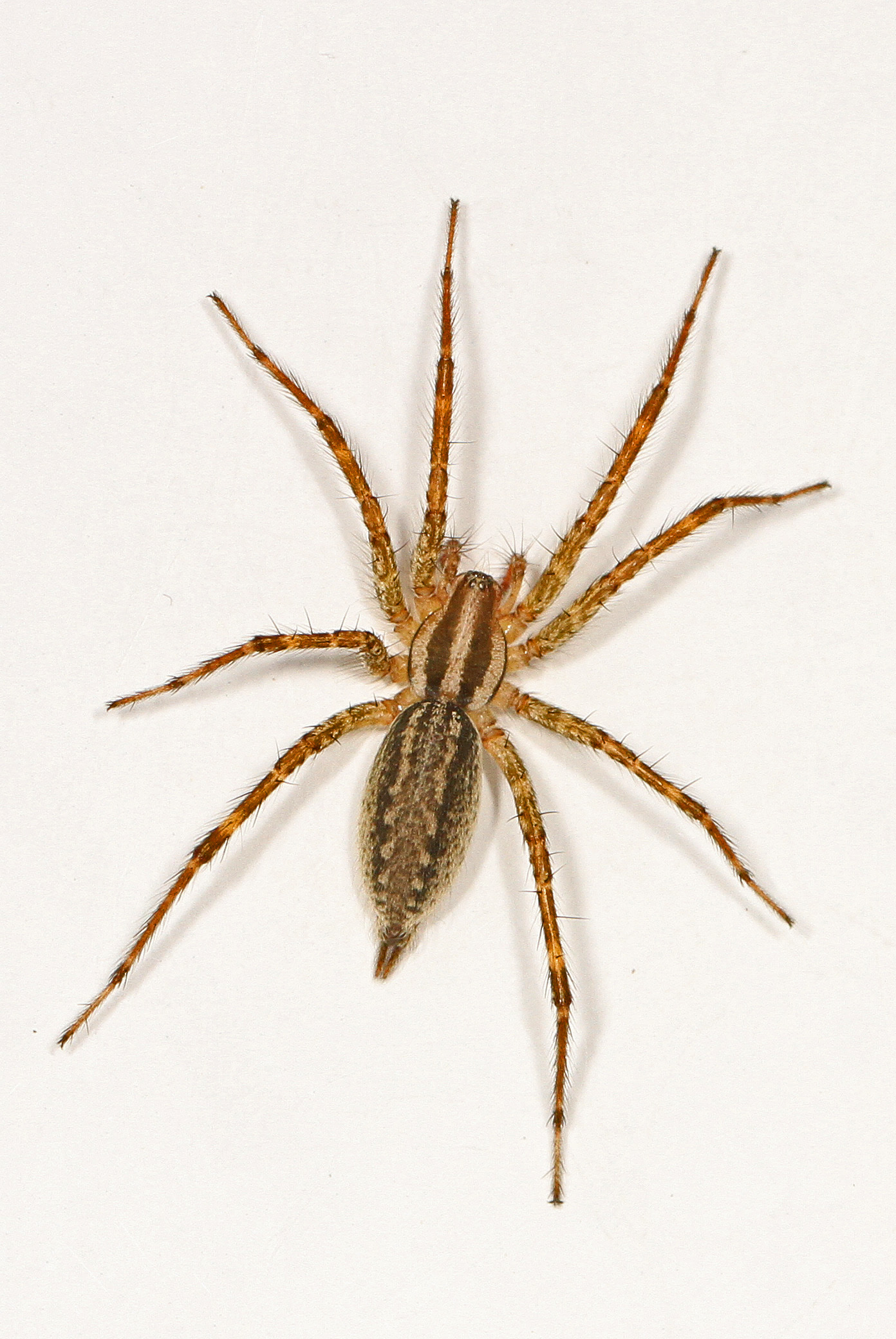
- Agelenopsis cf. pennsylvanica in Vernon, British Columbia
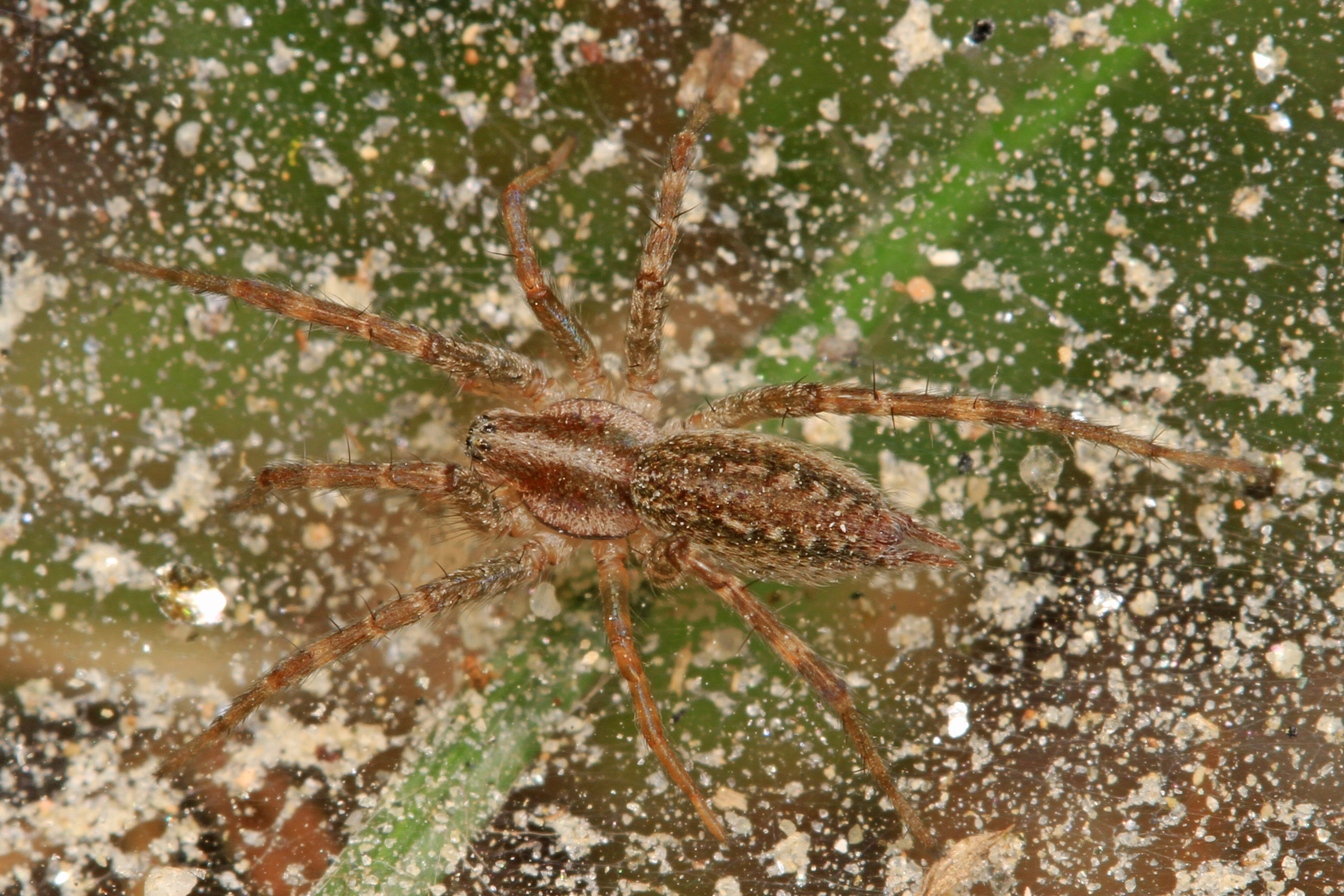
- Agelenopsis pennsylvanica in web, from Pocahontas State Park, Chesterfield, Virginia

Scientific classification
- Kingdom: Animalia
- Phylum: Arthropoda
- Subphylum: Chelicerata
- Class: Arachnida
- Order: Araneae
- Infraorder: Araneomorphae
- Family: Agelenidae
- Genus: Agelenopsis; Giebel, 1869

Type species
- A. potteri (Blackwall, 1846)

Species
- 14, see text

= Agelenopsis =

American grass spiders

Genus of spiders

Agelenopsis, commonly known as the American grass spiders, is a genus of funnel weavers described by C.G. Giebel in 1869. They weave sheet webs that have a funnel shelter on one edge. The web is not sticky, but these spiders make up for that with agility.

== Description ==
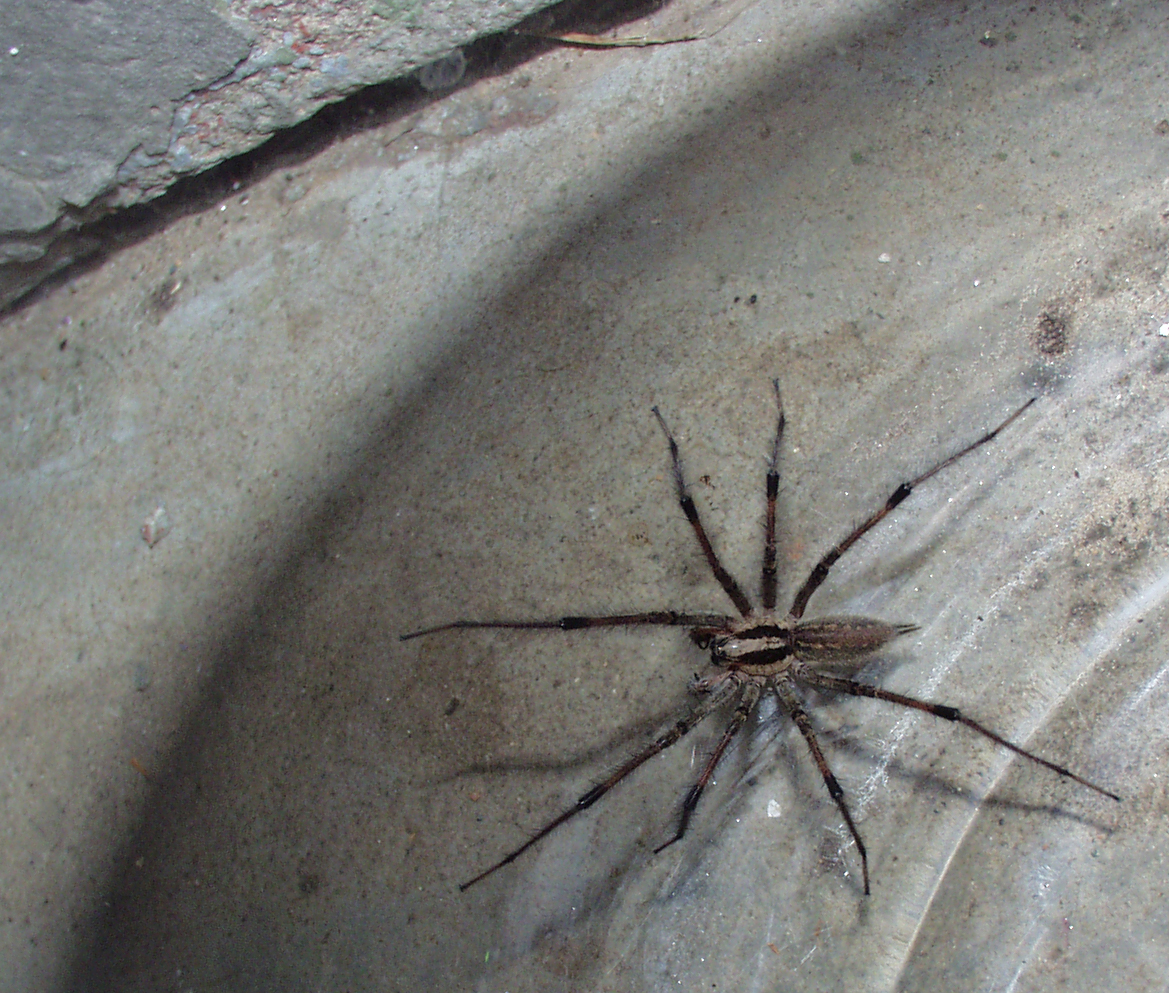
Agelenopsis sp. male, 17 mm (about 3/4 inch)

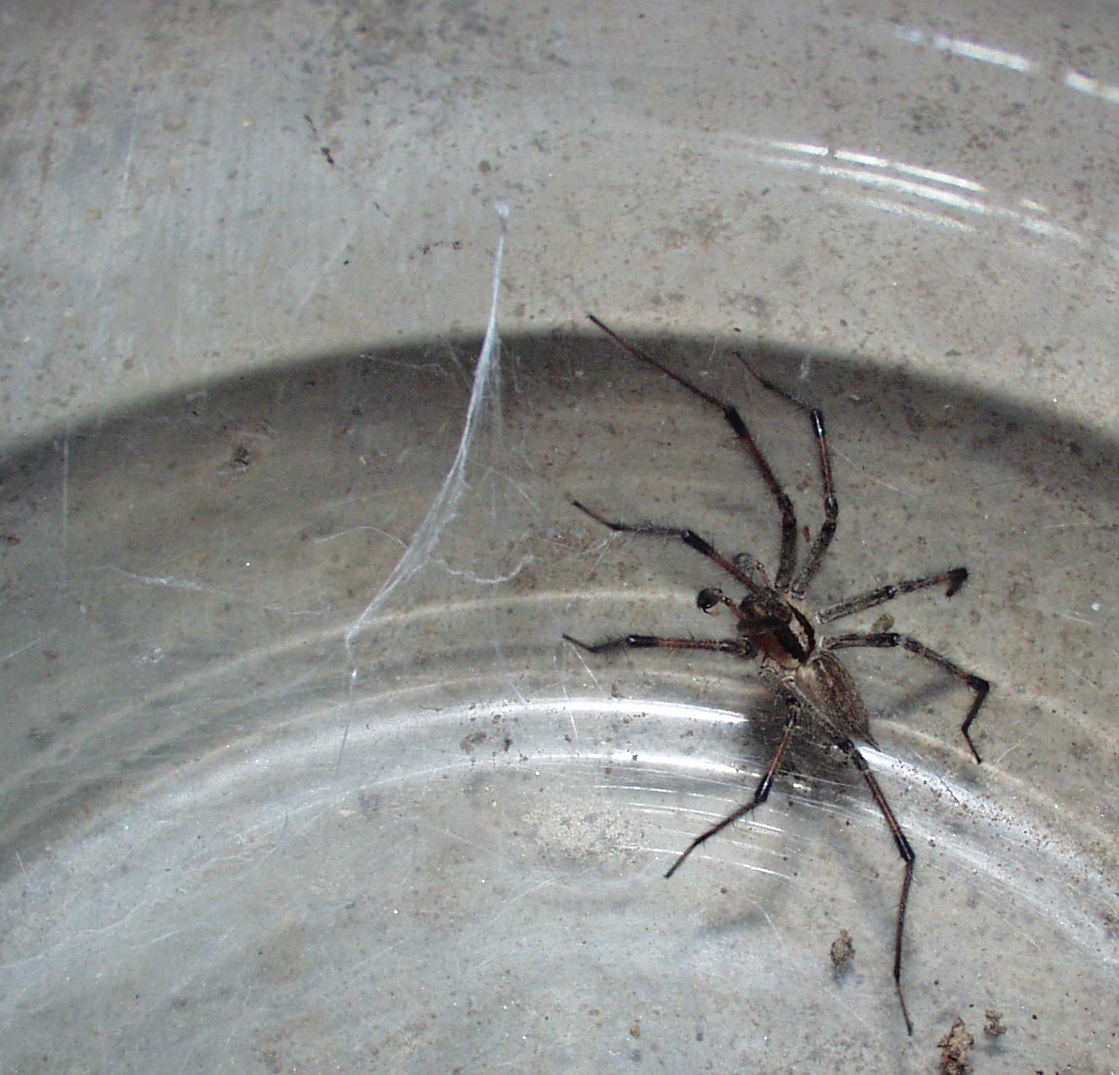
Same, showing elaborate pedipalps

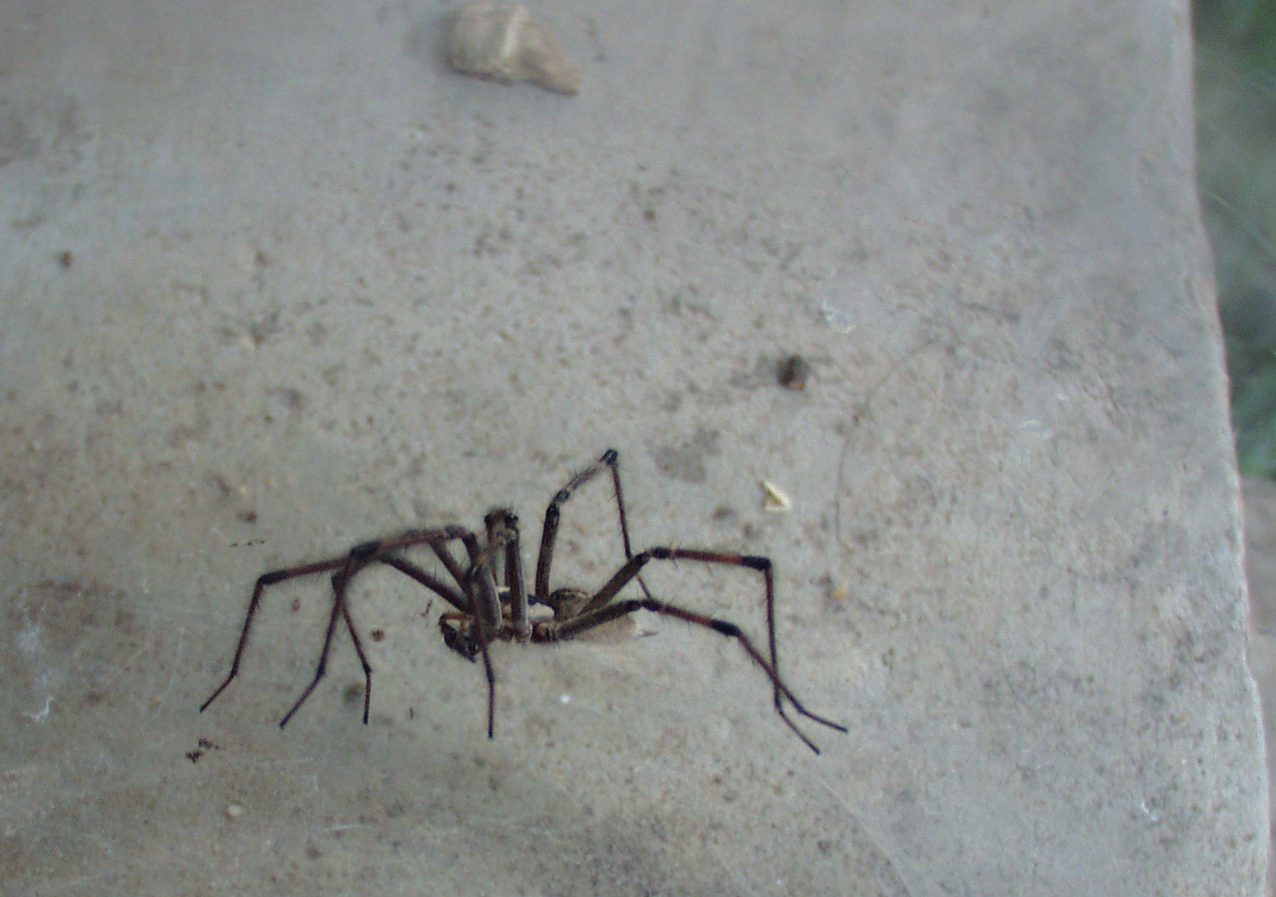
Same, from the side

The larger specimens (depending on species) can grow to about 20 mm in body length for females, and 18 mm for males. They may be recognized by the arrangement of their eight eyes into three rows. The top row has two eyes, the middle row has four eyes, and the bottom row has two eyes (spaced wider than the ones on the top row). They have two prominent hind spinnerets, somewhat indistinct bands on their legs, and two dark bands running down either side of the cephalothorax.

The main distinction between Agelenopsis and the related European genus Agelena consists of the pattern appearing on the cephalothorax; the former possesses two quasiparallel lines from the eyes to the beginning of the abdomen. The latter genus has curved, irregular lines that often meet at the end. Another difference is the length of the front legs row in females, but in males, the similarities are not as in line.

== Etymology ==
The genus name is a combination of Agelena (Eurasian grass spiders), a genus of similar spiders, and Greek -opsis "to look like".

== Behavior ==
They are harmless spiders. Although most spiders use their webs to catch prey, the grass spider's web lacks adhesive ability. The spiders make up for that with their fast running.

== Species ==
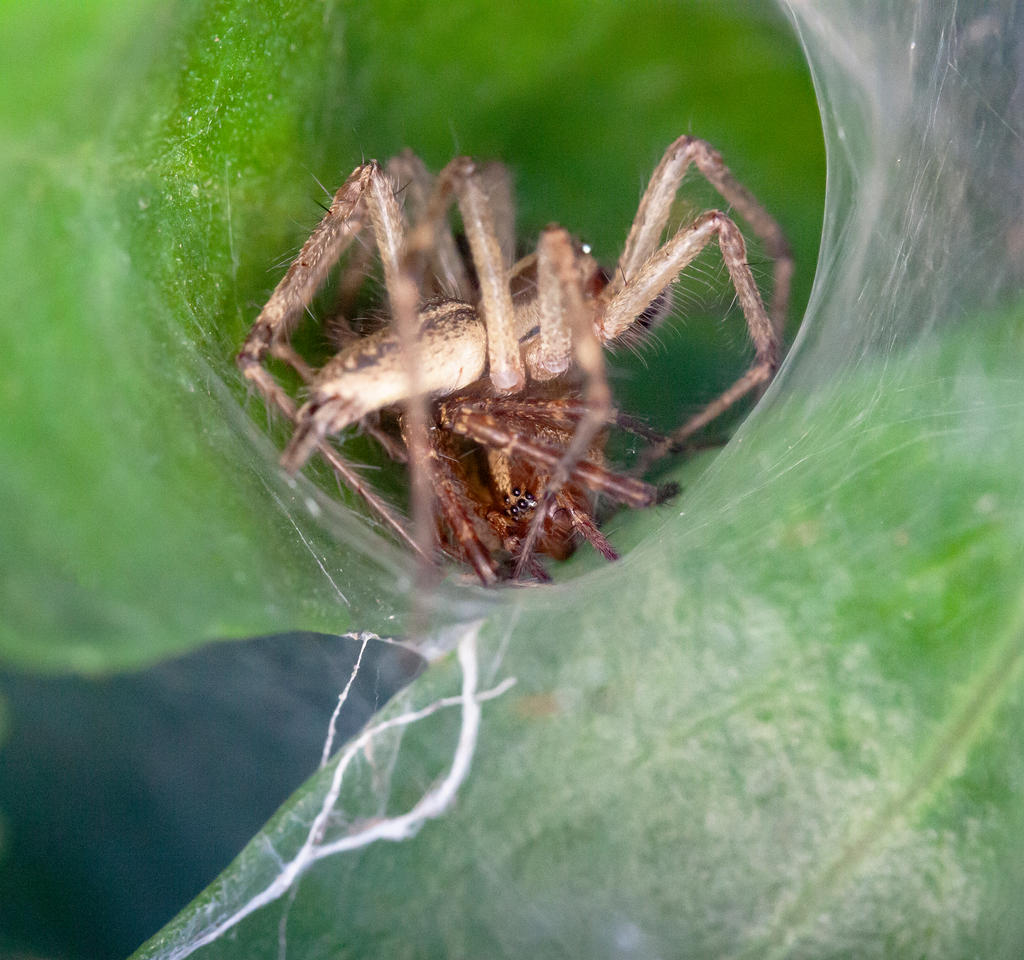
mating pair

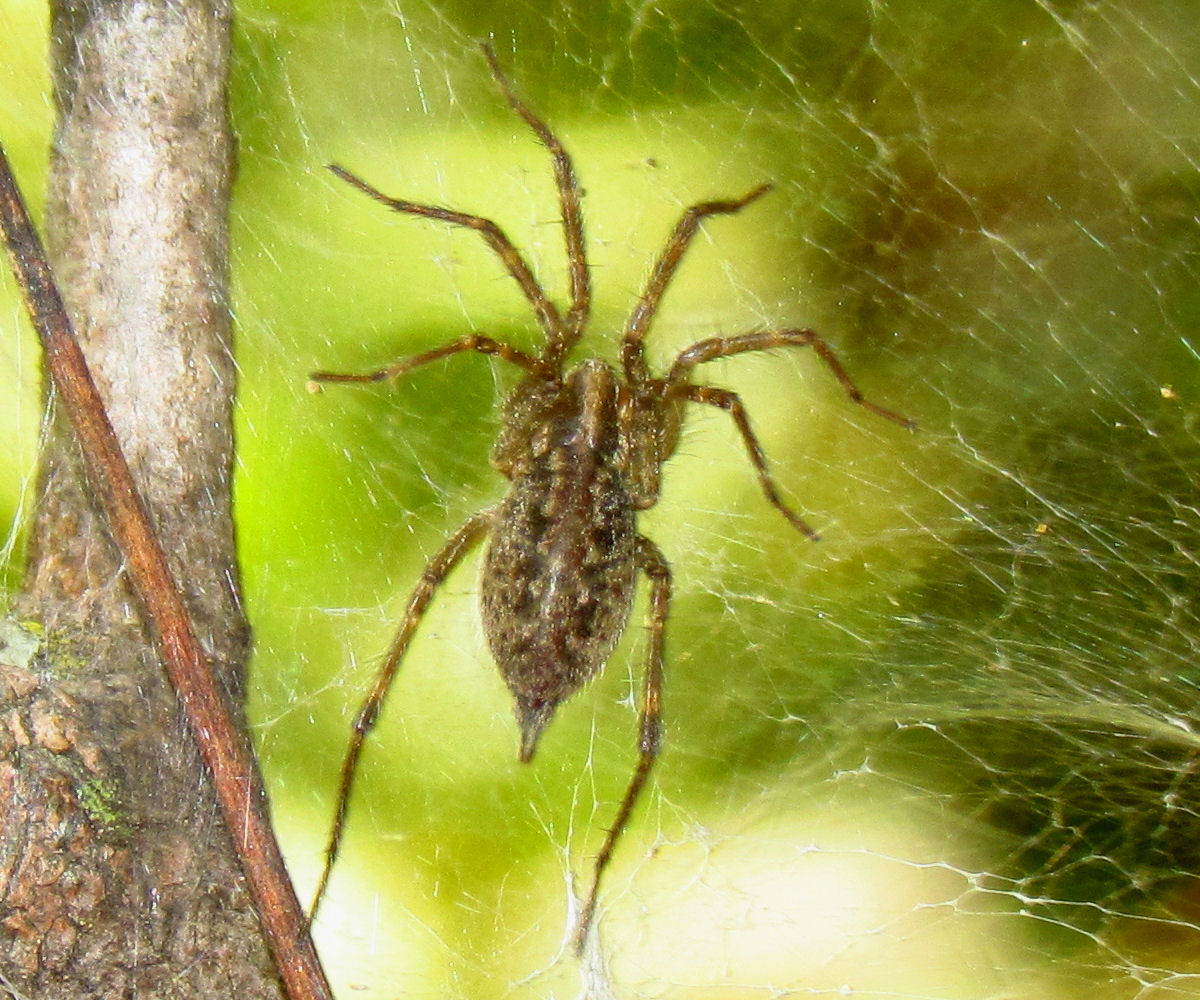
A. pennsylvanica female in web

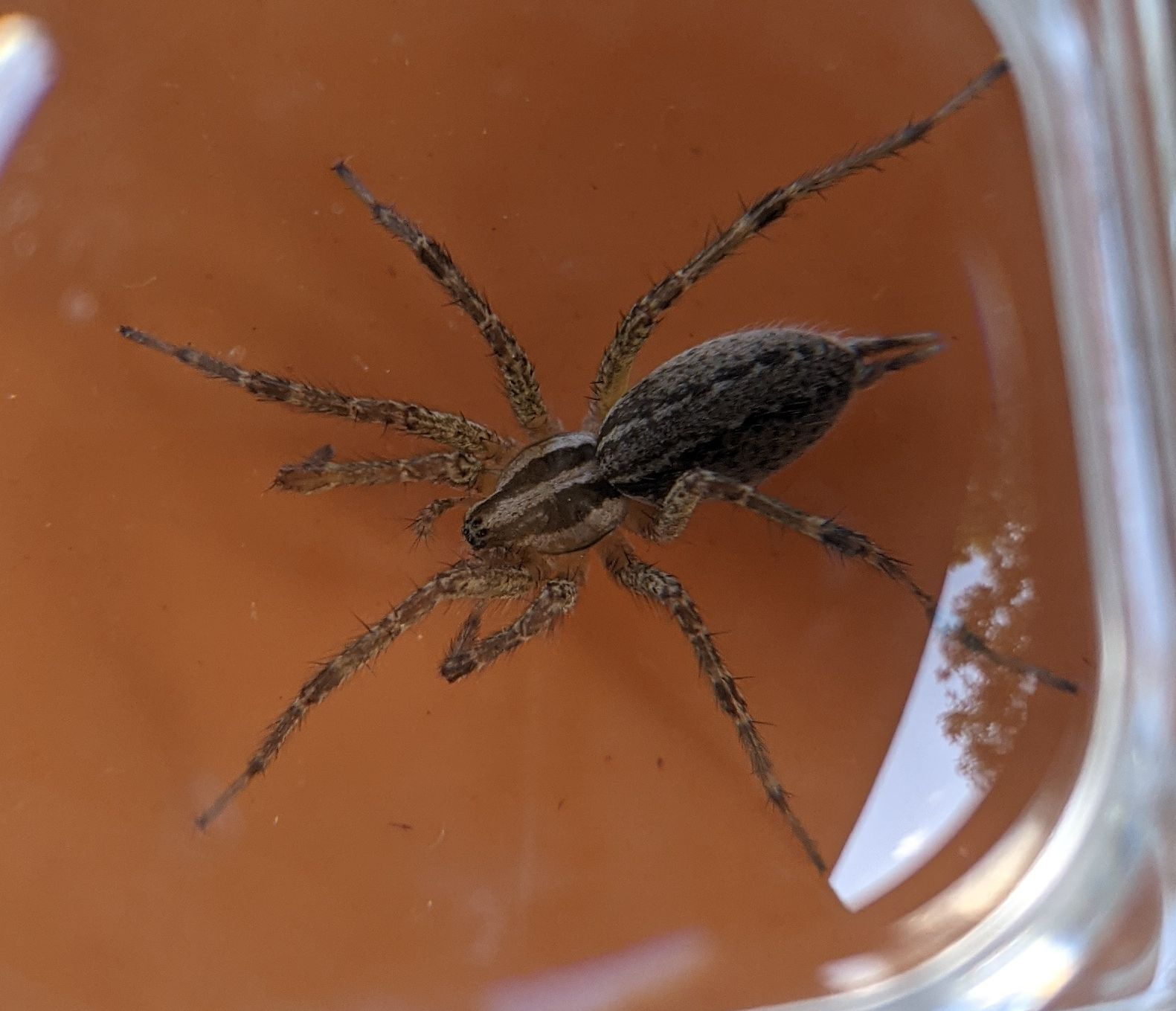
Agelenopsis under a magnifying glass

As of October 2026, this genus includes fourteen species:

- Agelenopsis actuosa (Gertsch & Ivie, 1936) – Canada, United States
- Agelenopsis aleenae Chamberlin & Ivie, 1935 – United States
- Agelenopsis aperta (Gertsch, 1934) – United States, Mexico
- Agelenopsis emertoni Chamberlin & Ivie, 1935 – Canada, United States
- Agelenopsis kastoni Chamberlin & Ivie, 1941 – United States
- Agelenopsis longistylus (Banks, 1901) – United States
- Agelenopsis naevia (Walckenaer, 1841) – Canada, United States
- Agelenopsis oklahoma (Gertsch, 1936) – Canada, United States
- Agelenopsis oregonensis Chamberlin & Ivie, 1935 – Canada, United States
- Agelenopsis pennsylvanica (C. L. Koch, 1843) – Canada, United States
- Agelenopsis potteri (Blackwall, 1846) – Canada, United States, Mexico. Introduced to Ukraine, Russia (Europe, Far East), Kyrgyzstan, China (type species)
- Agelenopsis riechertae Bosco & Chuang, 2018 – United States
- Agelenopsis spatula Chamberlin & Ivie, 1935 – United States
- Agelenopsis utahana (Chamberlin & Ivie, 1933) – Alaska, Canada, United States

== Gallery ==
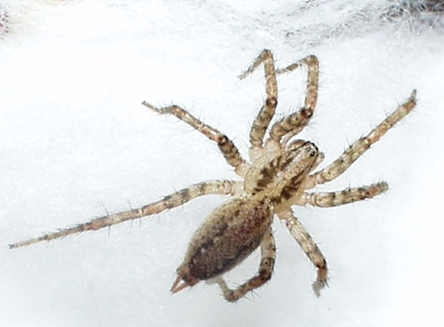
Agelenopsis sp. showing pronounced leg spines

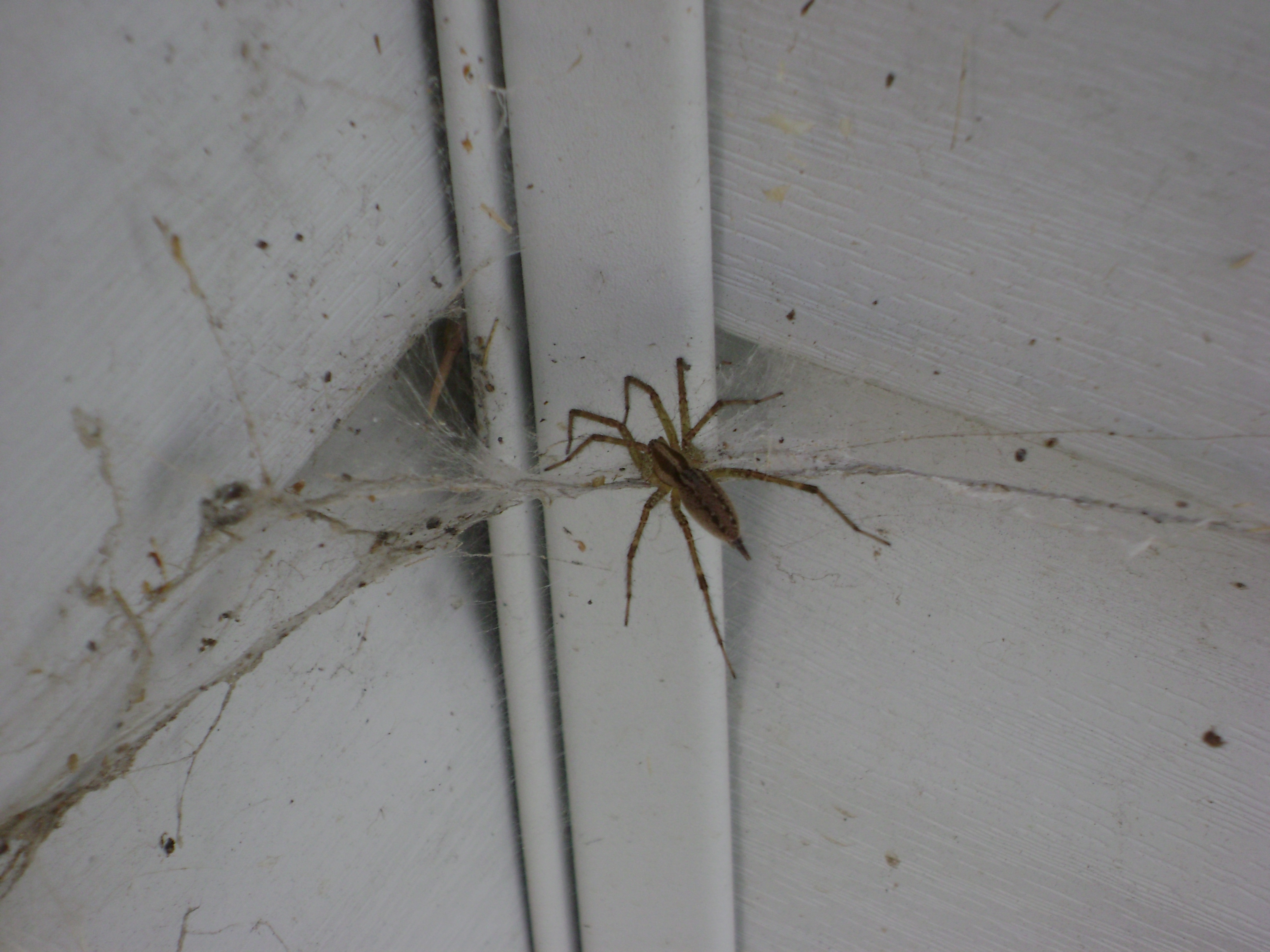
Agelenopsis in its web

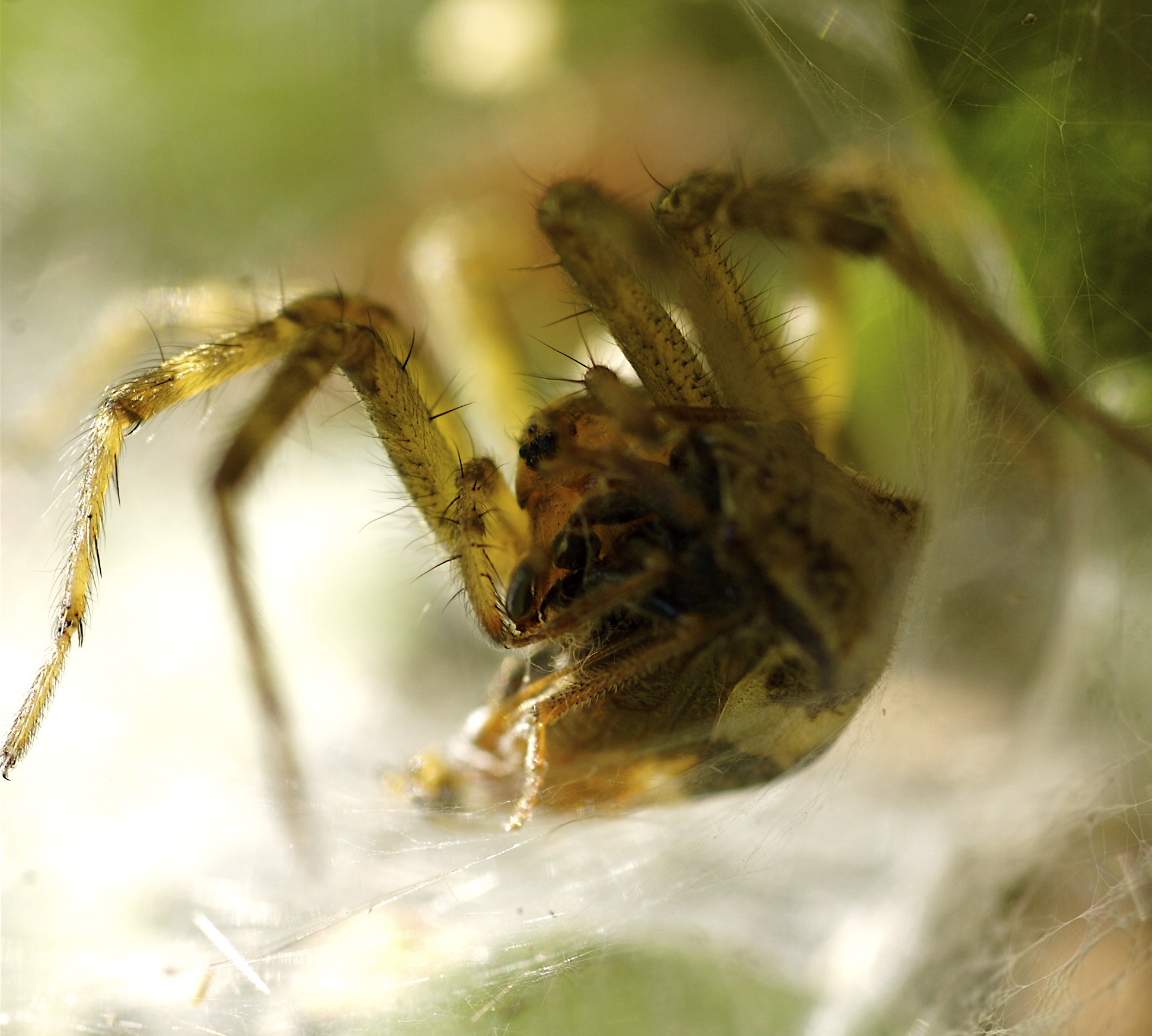
Agelenopsis in web built on grass, with prey

== See also ==
- Funnel-web spider
