= Agelenopsis spatula =

Scientific classification
- Kingdom: Animalia
- Phylum: Arthropoda
- Subphylum: Chelicerata
- Class: Arachnida
- Order: Araneae
- Infraorder: Araneomorphae
- Family: Agelenidae
- Genus: Agelenopsis
- Species: A. spatula

Binomial name
- Agelenopsis spatula (Chamberlin & Ivie, 1935)

Species of spider

Agelenopsis spatula is a species of funnel weaver in the spider family Agelenidae. The species was first described in 1935 by Ralph Vary Chamberlin and Wilton Ivie. It is found in the United States.
