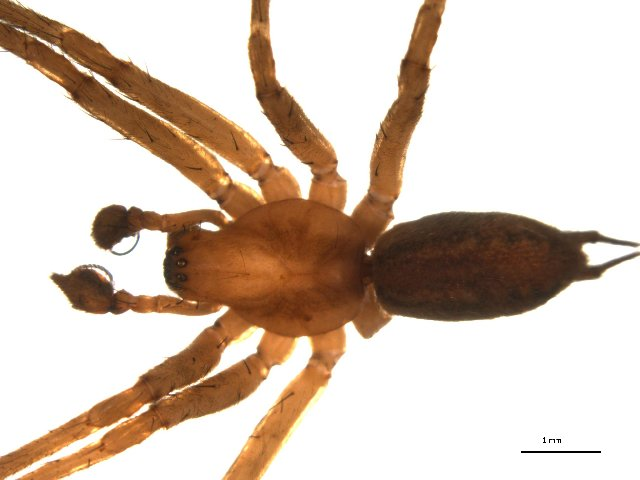

Conservation status
- Secure (NatureServe)

Scientific classification
- Kingdom: Animalia
- Phylum: Arthropoda
- Subphylum: Chelicerata
- Class: Arachnida
- Order: Araneae
- Infraorder: Araneomorphae
- Family: Agelenidae
- Genus: Agelenopsis
- Species: A. utahana

Binomial name
- Agelenopsis utahana (Chamberlin & Ivie, 1933)

= Agelenopsis utahana =

Species of spider

Agelenopsis utahana is a species of funnel weaver in the spider family Agelenidae. It is found in the United States and Canada.
