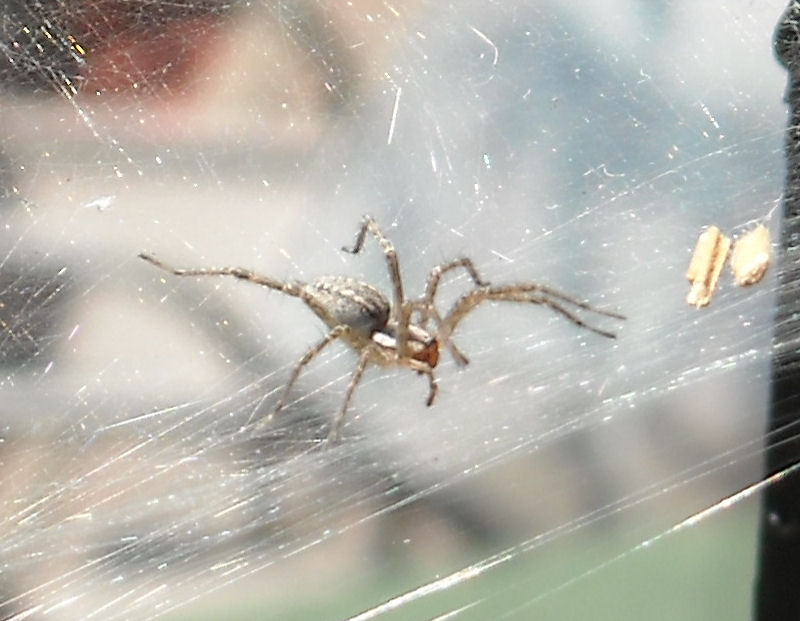
- Agelenopsis actuosa

Scientific classification
- Kingdom: Animalia
- Phylum: Arthropoda
- Subphylum: Chelicerata
- Class: Arachnida
- Order: Araneae
- Infraorder: Araneomorphae
- Family: Agelenidae
- Genus: Agelenopsis
- Species: A. actuosa

Binomial name
- Agelenopsis actuosa Gertsch & Ivie, 1936

= Agelenopsis actuosa =

Species of spider

Agelenopsis actuosa (actuosa = "active, agile") is a species of grass spider found in southwest Canada and the northwest United States.

The species are rather similar to those of the genus Agelena, instead of Agelenopsis, mainly because of their paler coloring and the meeting of the two lines on the cephalothorax (near the abdomen), which are usually parallel in other species. Females also possess a considerably larger, almost swollen abdomen after their sixth molt. It grows up to 2.5 cm (0.98 in) including legspan in females, with males 1/4 smaller. It can detect movements in the wind and run for retreat before a larger threat even approaches. One way to lure the spider out is to tickle the inner end of the funnel with a grass bud.
