= Agelenopsis aleenae =

Scientific classification
- Kingdom: Animalia
- Phylum: Arthropoda
- Subphylum: Chelicerata
- Class: Arachnida
- Order: Araneae
- Infraorder: Araneomorphae
- Family: Agelenidae
- Genus: Agelenopsis
- Species: A. aleenae

Binomial name
- Agelenopsis aleenae (Chamberlin & Ivie, 1935)

Species of spider

Agelenopsis aleenae is a species of funnel weaver in the spider family Agelenidae. It was first described in 1935 by Ralph Vary Chamberlin and Wilton Ivie. The species is found in the central United States.

The species is named after Aleen Ivie, Wilton Ivie's wife.
