= Agelenopsis riechertae =

Scientific classification
- Kingdom: Animalia
- Phylum: Arthropoda
- Subphylum: Chelicerata
- Class: Arachnida
- Order: Araneae
- Infraorder: Araneomorphae
- Family: Agelenidae
- Genus: Agelenopsis
- Species: A. riechertae

Binomial name
- Agelenopsis riechertae (Bosco & Chuang, 2018)

Species of spider

Agelenopsis riechertae is a species of funnel weaver in the spider family Agelenidae. The species was first described in 2018. It is found in the central United States.
