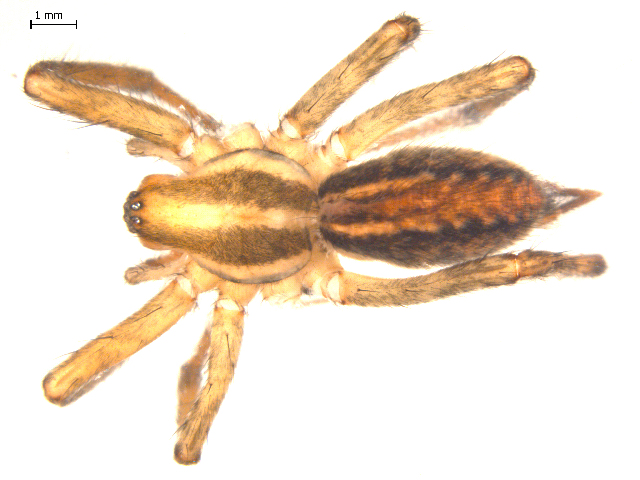

Scientific classification
- Kingdom: Animalia
- Phylum: Arthropoda
- Subphylum: Chelicerata
- Class: Arachnida
- Order: Araneae
- Infraorder: Araneomorphae
- Family: Agelenidae
- Genus: Agelenopsis
- Species: A. emertoni

Binomial name
- Agelenopsis emertoni Chamberlin & Ivie, 1935

= Agelenopsis emertoni =

Species of spider

Agelenopsis emertoni is a species of funnel weaver in the family of spiders known as Agelenidae. It is found in the United States. The spider was named to honour arachnologist James H. Emerton. A. emertoni is distinguished from other Agelenopsis species in the genus by the male's loosely coiling embolus making more than one full circle, and a claw-like conductor tip. These features are sclerites of the male sex organ which is used to inseminate the female. The female has a distinctive conducting tube in her genitalia. The male can be between 6 and 13mm. Distribution is in the following states of the USA: Arkansas, Colorado, Florida, Georgia, Louisiana, Massachusetts, Mississippi, Missouri, New Jersey, New York, North Carolina, Oklahoma, Pennsylvania, Tennessee, Texas, Virginia.
