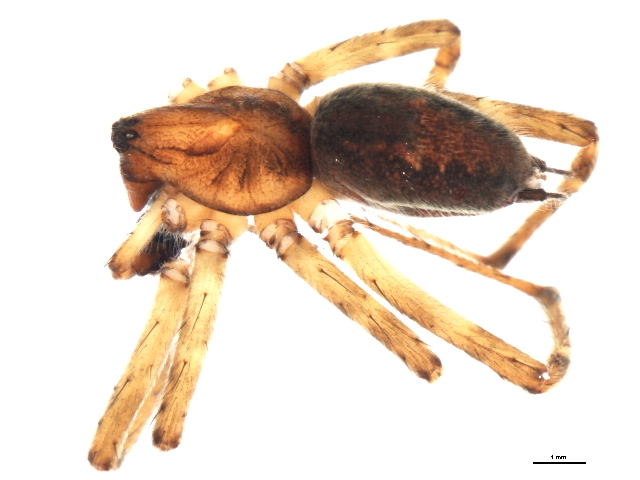
- A. oregonensis

Scientific classification
- Kingdom: Animalia
- Phylum: Arthropoda
- Subphylum: Chelicerata
- Class: Arachnida
- Order: Araneae
- Infraorder: Araneomorphae
- Family: Agelenidae
- Genus: Agelenopsis
- Species: A. oregonensis

Binomial name
- Agelenopsis oregonensis Chamberlin & Ivie, 1935

= Agelenopsis oregonensis =

Species of spider

Agelenopsis oregonensis is a species of funnel weaver in the spider family Agelenidae. It is found in the United States and Canada.
