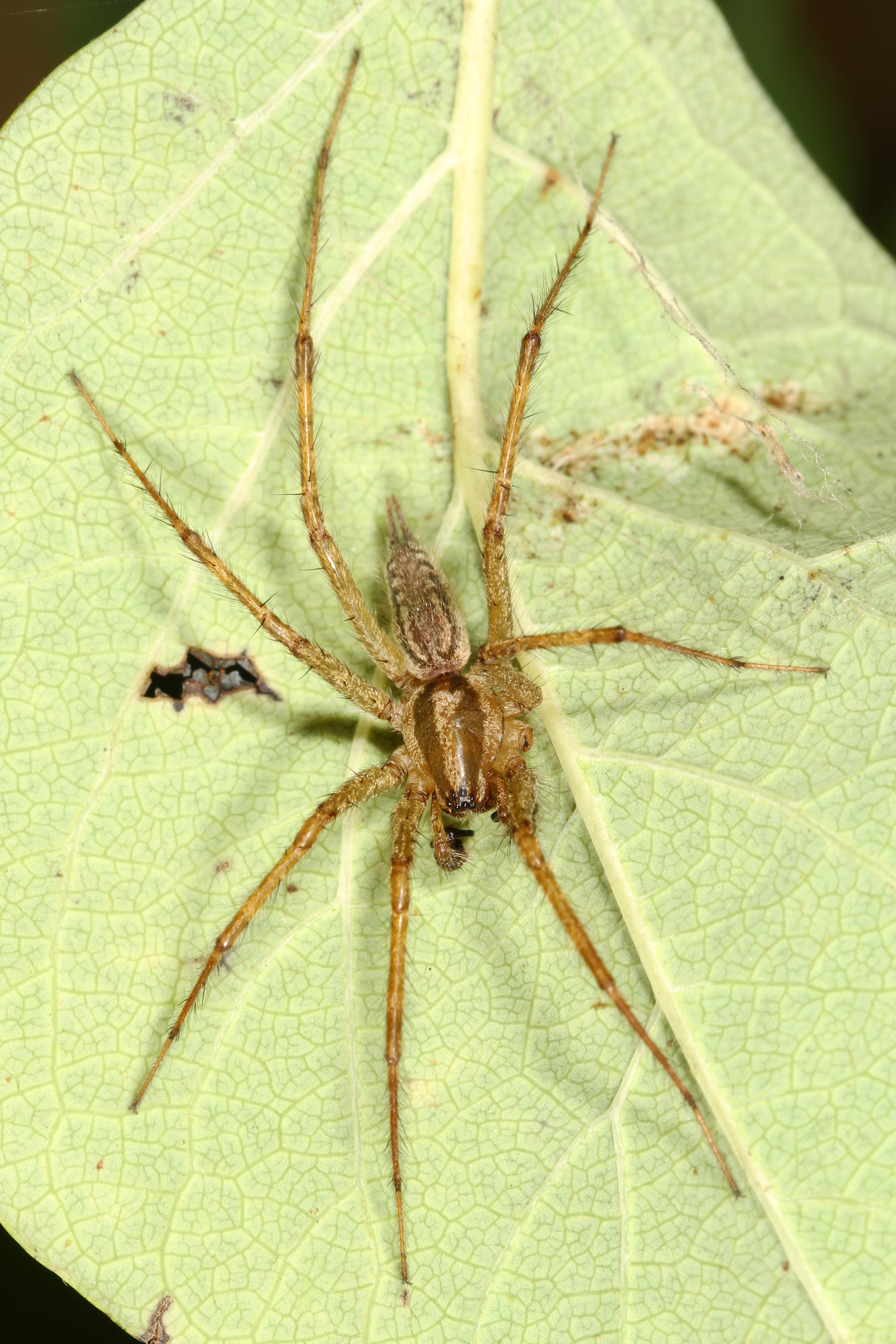

Conservation status
- Secure (NatureServe)

Scientific classification
- Kingdom: Animalia
- Phylum: Arthropoda
- Subphylum: Chelicerata
- Class: Arachnida
- Order: Araneae
- Infraorder: Araneomorphae
- Family: Agelenidae
- Genus: Agelenopsis
- Species: A. potteri

Binomial name
- Agelenopsis potteri (Blackwall, 1846)

= Agelenopsis potteri =

Species of spider

Agelenopsis potteri is a species of funnel weaver in the spider family Agelenidae. Native to North America, it has been introduced into Ukraine, Russia, and Kyrgyzstan.
