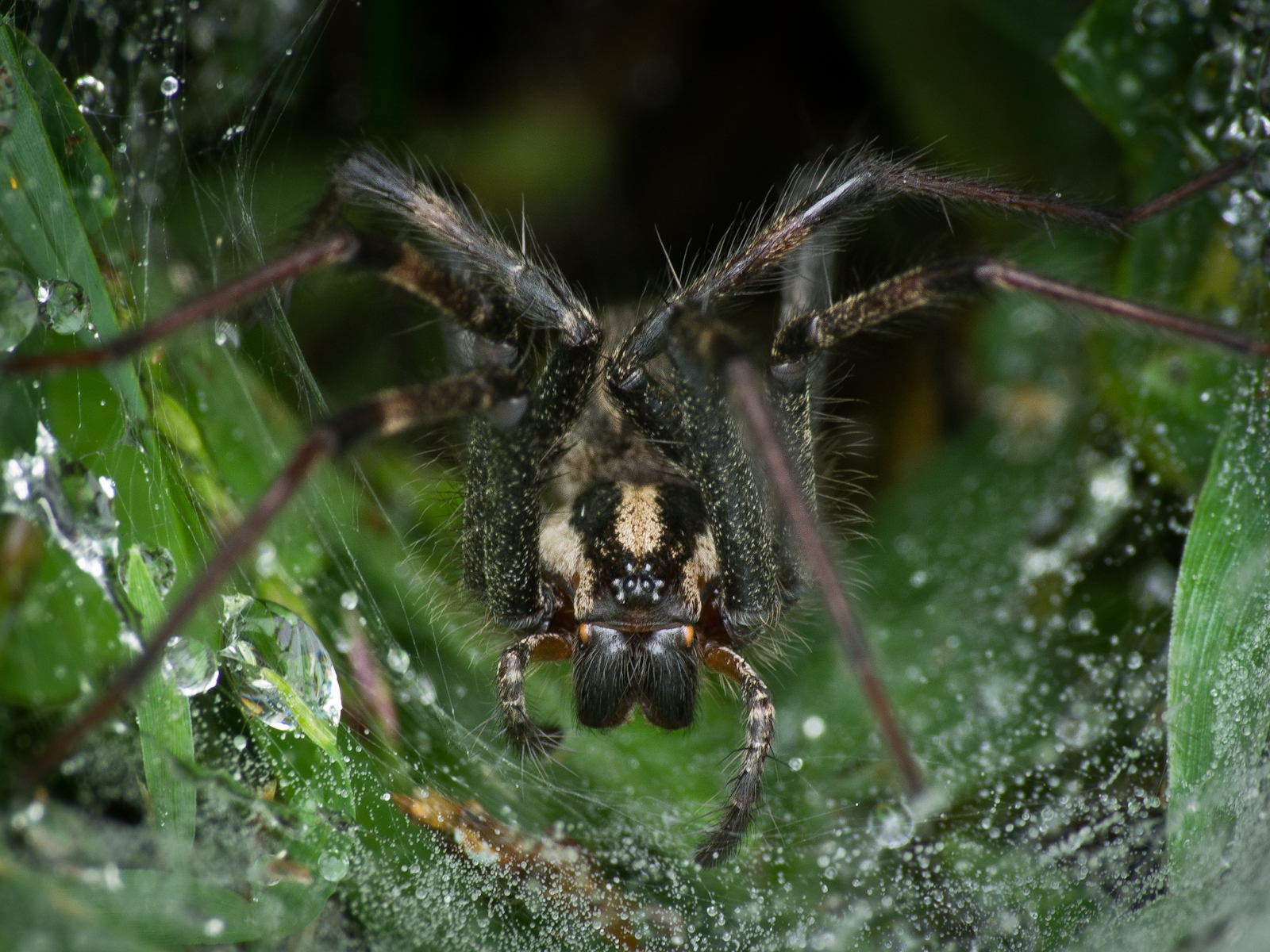

Scientific classification
- Domain: Eukaryota
- Kingdom: Animalia
- Phylum: Arthropoda
- Subphylum: Chelicerata
- Class: Arachnida
- Order: Araneae
- Infraorder: Araneomorphae
- Family: Agelenidae
- Genus: Agelenopsis
- Species: A. naevia

Binomial name
- Agelenopsis naevia (Walckenaer, 1841)

= Agelenopsis naevia =

Species of spider

Agelenopsis naevia is a species of funnel weaver in the family Agelenidae. It is found in the United States and Canada.

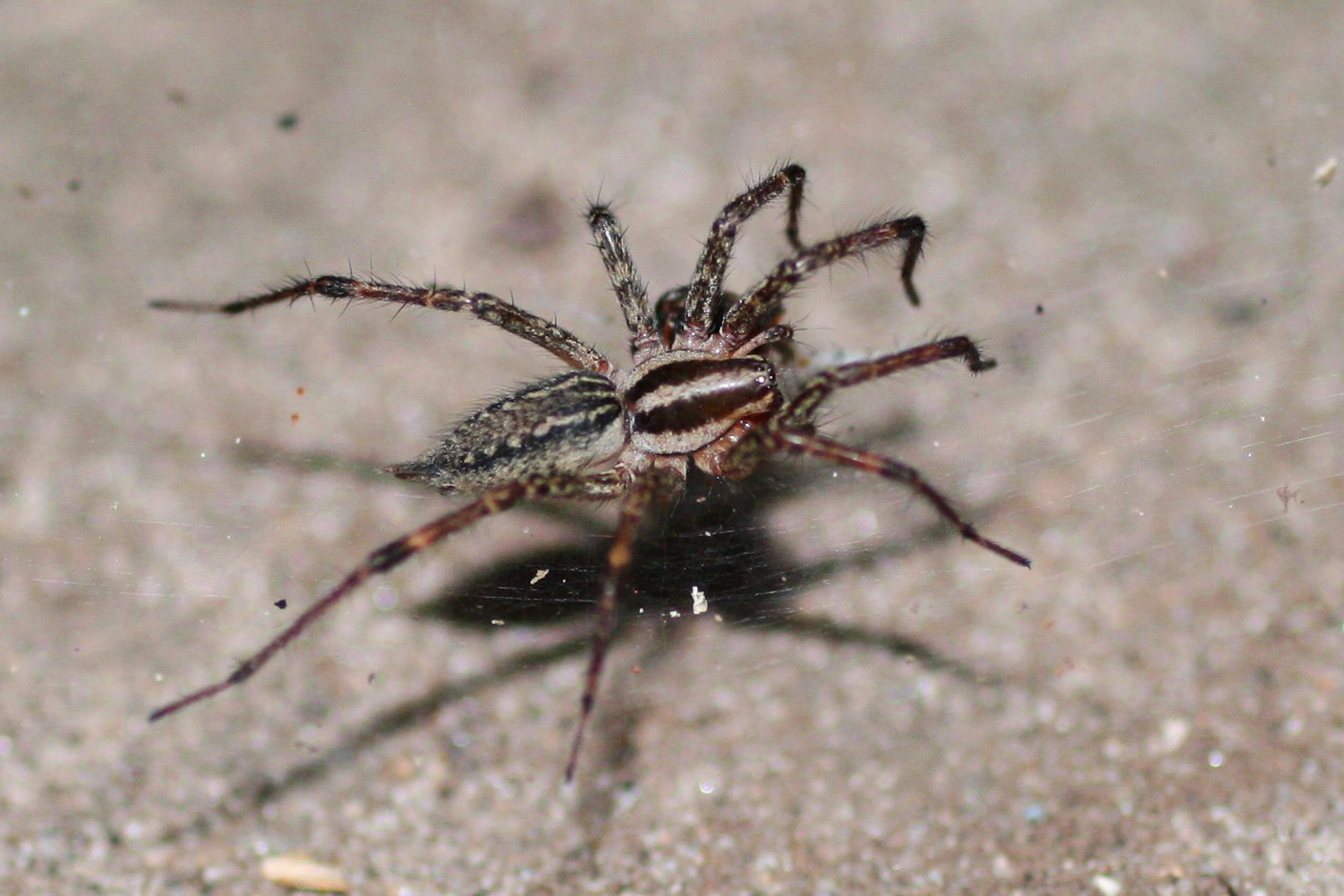
