= Oramia rubrioides =

Conservation status
- Naturally Uncommon (NZ TCS)

Scientific classification
- Domain: Eukaryota
- Kingdom: Animalia
- Phylum: Arthropoda
- Subphylum: Chelicerata
- Class: Arachnida
- Order: Araneae
- Infraorder: Araneomorphae
- Family: Agelenidae
- Genus: Oramia
- Species: O. rubrioides

Binomial name
- Oramia rubrioides (Hogg, 1909)

Synonyms
- Amaurobius rubrioides; Badumna scylla; Ixeuticus rubrioides

Species of spider

Oramia rubrioides is a species of Agelenidae that is endemic to New Zealand.

== Taxonomy ==
This species was described as Amaurobius rubrioides in 1909 by Henry Roughton Hogg. It was most recently revised in 1973. The type specimens are stored in Otago Museum.

== Description ==
The female is recorded at 16.78mm in length whereas the male is 13.5mm. The carapace is coloured reddish brown and darkens anteriorly. The legs are brownish yellow and have dark bands. The abdomen is pale brownish grey and is patterned dorsally.

== Distribution ==
This species is only known from Snares Island, New Zealand.

== Conservation status ==
Under the New Zealand Threat Classification System, this species is listed as "Naturally Uncommon" with the qualifiers of "Island Endemic" and "One Location".
