= Oramia mackerrowi =

Conservation status
- Data Deficit (NZ TCS)

Scientific classification
- Kingdom: Animalia
- Phylum: Arthropoda
- Subphylum: Chelicerata
- Class: Arachnida
- Order: Araneae
- Infraorder: Araneomorphae
- Family: Agelenidae
- Genus: Oramia
- Species: O. mackerrowi

Binomial name
- Oramia mackerrowi (Marples, 1959)

Synonyms
- Ixeuticus rubrioides mackerrowi

Species of spider

Oramia mackerrowi is a species of Agelenidae that is endemic to New Zealand.

== Taxonomy ==
This species was first described as Ixeuticus rubrioides mackerrowi in 1959 from a female specimen. It was most recently revised in 1973. The holotype is stored in Canterbury Museum.

== Description ==
The female is recorded at 11.33mm in length. The carapace is yellow orange and darkens into reddish brown anteriorly. The legs are yellow brown. The abdomen is grey with pale markings dorsally.

== Distribution ==
This species is only known from Fiordland, New Zealand.

== Conservation status ==
Under the New Zealand Threat Classification System, this species is listed as "Data Deficient" with the qualifiers of ""Data Poor: Size", "Data Poor: Trend" and "One Location".
