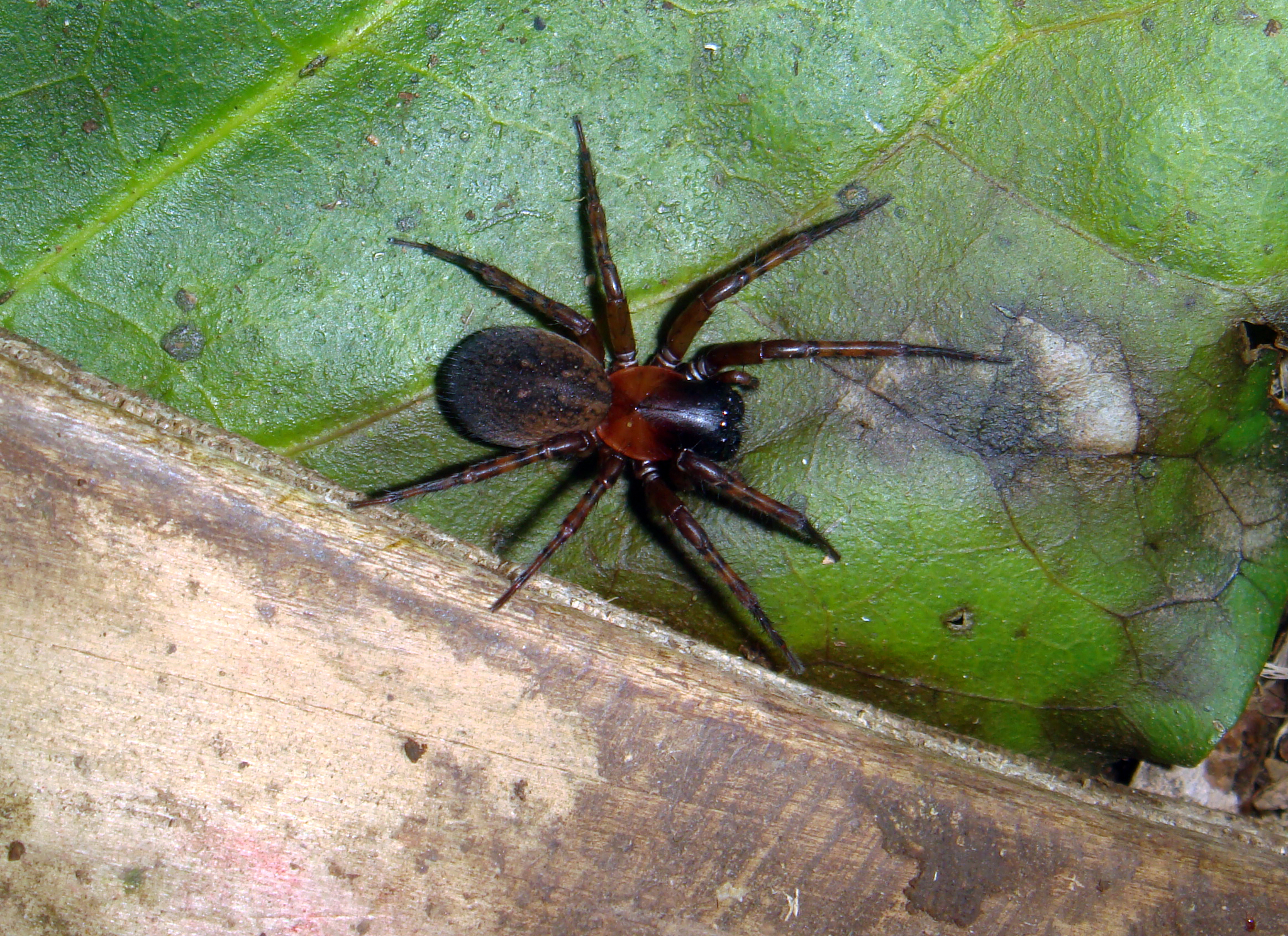

Conservation status
- Naturally Uncommon (NZ TCS)

Scientific classification
- Kingdom: Animalia
- Phylum: Arthropoda
- Subphylum: Chelicerata
- Class: Arachnida
- Order: Araneae
- Infraorder: Araneomorphae
- Family: Agelenidae
- Genus: Oramia
- Species: O. chathamensis

Binomial name
- Oramia chathamensis (Simon, 1899)

Synonyms
- Amaurobius chathamensis; Ixeuticus chathamensis

= Oramia chathamensis =

Species of spider

Oramia chathamensis is a species of Agelenidae that is endemic to New Zealand.

== Taxonomy ==
This species was described as Amaurobius chathamensis in 1899 by Eugène Simon. It was most recently revised in 1973. The holotype is stored in the National Museum of Natural History, Paris.

== Description ==
The male is recorded at 8.8mm in length. The carapace is coloured reddish brown and is darkened anteriorly.

== Distribution ==
This species is only known from the Chatham Islands in New Zealand.

== Conservation status ==
Under the New Zealand Threat Classification System, this species is listed as "Naturally Uncommon" with the qualifier of "Range Restricted".
