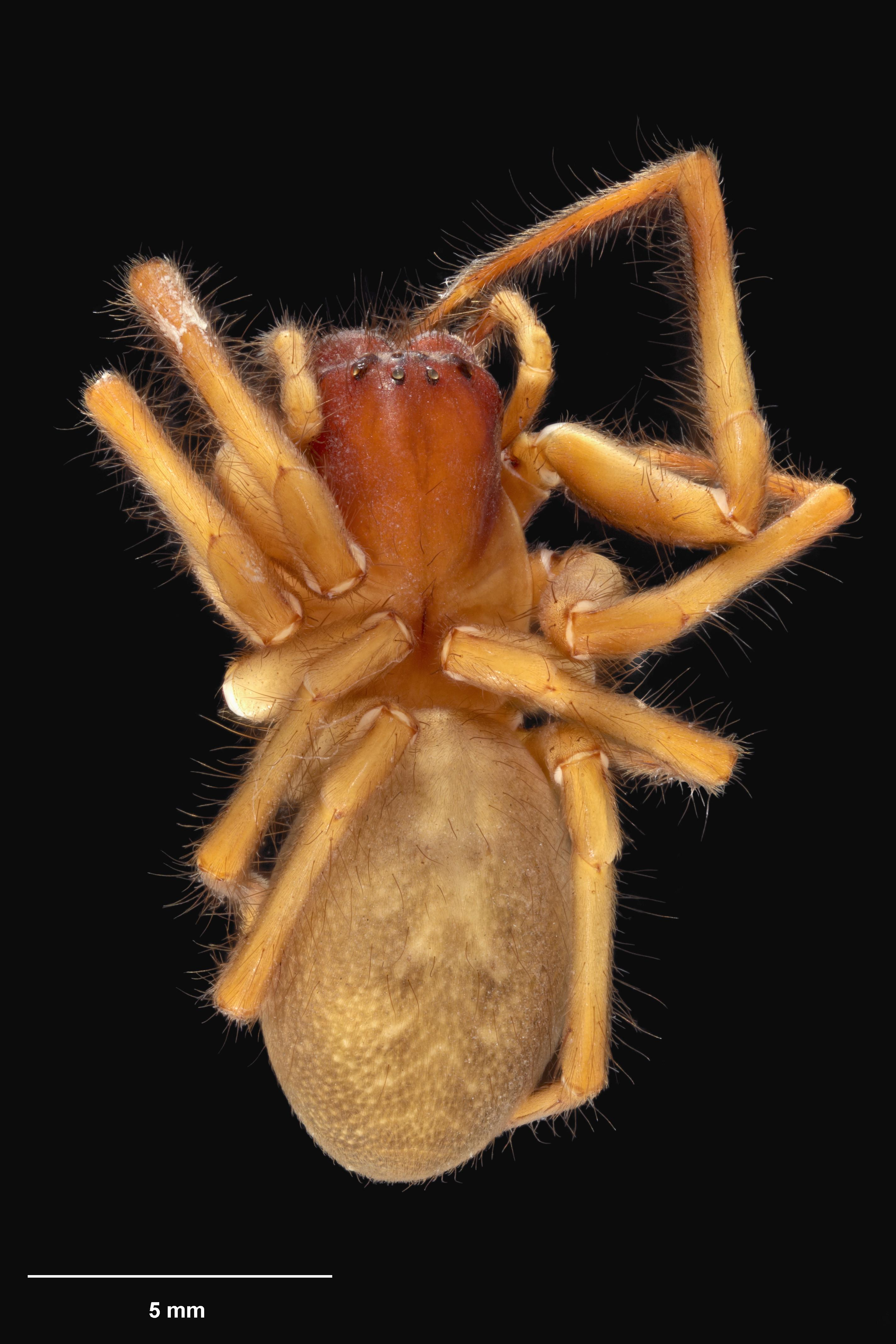

Conservation status
- Naturally Uncommon (NZ TCS)

Scientific classification
- Kingdom: Animalia
- Phylum: Arthropoda
- Subphylum: Chelicerata
- Class: Arachnida
- Order: Araneae
- Infraorder: Araneomorphae
- Family: Agelenidae
- Genus: Oramia
- Species: O. solanderensis

Binomial name
- Oramia solanderensis Forster & Wilton, 1973

= Oramia solanderensis =

Species of spider

Oramia solanderensis is a species of Agelenidae that is endemic to New Zealand.

== Taxonomy ==
This species was described in 1973 by Ray Forster and Cecil Wilton from a female specimen. The holotype is stored in Te Papa Museum under registration number AS.000111.

== Description ==
The female is recorded at 13.77mm in length. The cephalothorax is coloured yellow brown and darkens into reddish brown anteriorly. The abdomen is mottled brown with pale markings dorsally.

== Distribution ==
This species is only known from Solander Island, New Zealand.

== Conservation status ==
Under the New Zealand Threat Classification System, this species is listed as "Naturally Uncommon" with the qualifiers of "Island Endemic" and "One Location".
