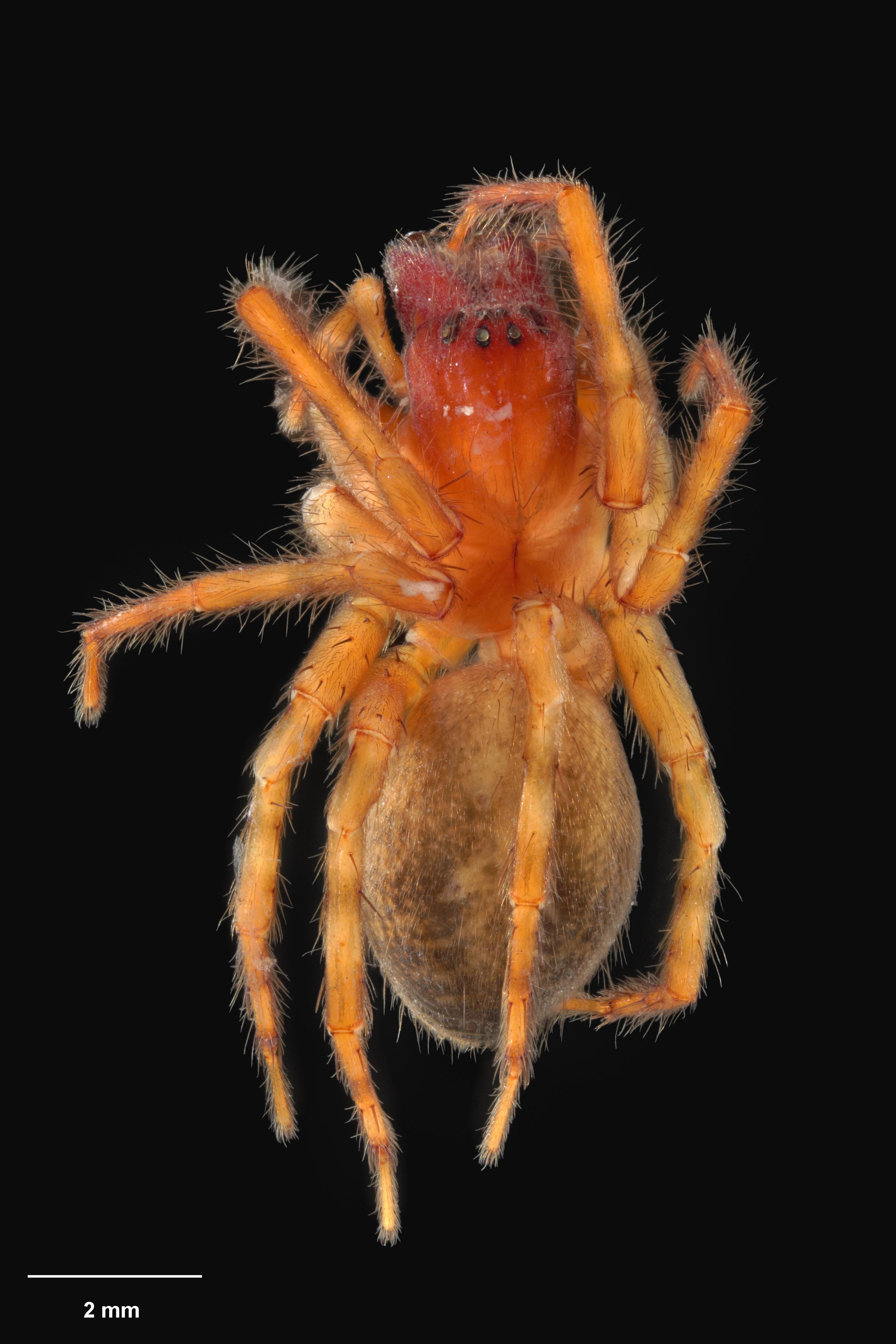

Conservation status
- Naturally Uncommon (NZ TCS)

Scientific classification
- Kingdom: Animalia
- Phylum: Arthropoda
- Subphylum: Chelicerata
- Class: Arachnida
- Order: Araneae
- Infraorder: Araneomorphae
- Family: Agelenidae
- Genus: Oramia
- Species: O. marplesi

Binomial name
- Oramia marplesi Forster, 1964

= Oramia marplesi =

Species of spider

Oramia marplesi is a species of Agelenidae that is endemic to New Zealand.

== Taxonomy ==
This species was first described in 1964 by Ray Forster from female specimens. It was most recently revised in 1973, in which the male was described. The holotype is stored in Te Papa Museum under registration number A.000065.

== Description ==
The female is recorded at 9.32mm in length whereas the male is 9mm. The carapace is coloured orange brown and darkens anteriorly. The legs are yellowish brown. The abdomen is dark brown with pale areas dorsally.

== Distribution ==
This species is only known from Auckland Island, New Zealand.

== Conservation status ==
Under the New Zealand Threat Classification System, this species is listed as "Naturally Uncommon" with the qualifiers of "Island Endemic" and "Range Restricted".
