= Oramia occidentalis =

Conservation status
- Data Deficient (NZ TCS)

Scientific classification
- Domain: Eukaryota
- Kingdom: Animalia
- Phylum: Arthropoda
- Subphylum: Chelicerata
- Class: Arachnida
- Order: Araneae
- Infraorder: Araneomorphae
- Family: Agelenidae
- Genus: Oramia
- Species: O. occidentalis

Binomial name
- Oramia occidentalis (Marples, 1959)

Synonyms
- Ixeuticus chathamensis occidentalis

Species of spider

Oramia occidentalis is a species of Agelenidae that is endemic to New Zealand.

== Taxonomy ==
This species was first described as Ixeuticus chathamensis occidentalis in 1959 from a female specimen. It was most recently revised in 1973. The holotype is stored in Otago Museum.

== Description ==
The female is recorded at 13.7mm in length. The carapace is orange brown and darkens into reddish brown anteriorly. The legs are yellow brown. The abdomen is dark with pale markings dorsally.

== Distribution ==
This species is only known from Whero Rock, near Stewart Island, New Zealand.

== Conservation status ==
Under the New Zealand Threat Classification System, this species is listed as "Data Deficient" with the qualifiers of ""Data Poor: Size", "Data Poor: Trend" and "One Location".
