= Oramia littoralis =

Conservation status
- Naturally Uncommon (NZ TCS)

Scientific classification
- Kingdom: Animalia
- Phylum: Arthropoda
- Subphylum: Chelicerata
- Class: Arachnida
- Order: Araneae
- Infraorder: Araneomorphae
- Family: Agelenidae
- Genus: Oramia
- Species: O. littoralis

Binomial name
- Oramia littoralis Forster & Wilton, 1973

Species of spider

Oramia littoralis is a species of Agelenidae that is endemic to New Zealand.

== Taxonomy ==
This species was described in 1973 by Ray Forster and Cecil Wilton from male and female specimens. The holotype is stored in Otago Museum.

== Description ==
The female is recorded at 12.7mm in length whereas the male is 11.2mm. The carapace is pale orange and darkens into reddish brown anteriorly. The abdomen is brownsh grey and is patterned dorsally.

== Distribution and habitat ==
This species is only known from Otago, New Zealand. It appears to be restricted to beaches just above the high tide mark.

== Conservation status ==
Under the New Zealand Threat Classification System, this species is listed as "Naturally Uncommon" with the qualifiers of "Climate Impact", "Data Poor: Size" and "Data Poor: Trend".
