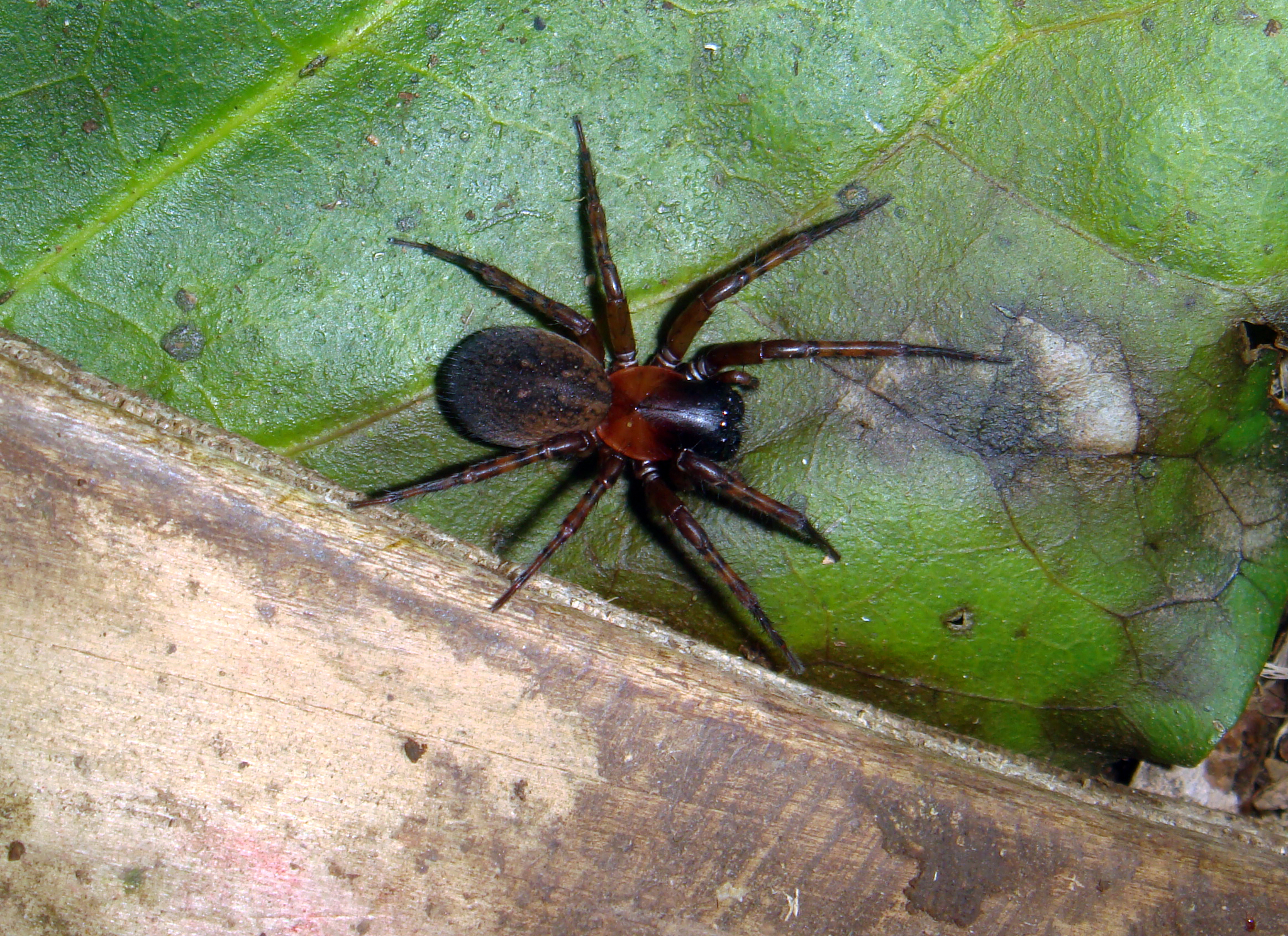
- Oramia chathamensis

Scientific classification
- Kingdom: Animalia
- Phylum: Arthropoda
- Subphylum: Chelicerata
- Class: Arachnida
- Order: Araneae
- Infraorder: Araneomorphae
- Family: Agelenidae
- Genus: Oramia; Forster, 1964

Type species
- O. rubrioides (Hogg, 1909)

Species
- 8, see text

= Oramia =

Genus of spiders

Oramia is a genus of South Pacific funnel weavers first described by Raymond Robert Forster in 1964.

== Species ==
As of October 2026 it contains eight species:

- Oramia chathamensis (Simon, 1899) – New Zealand (Chatham Is.)
- Oramia frequens (Rainbow, 1920) – Australia (Lord Howe Is.)
- Oramia littoralis Forster & Wilton, 1973 – New Zealand
- Oramia mackerrowi (Marples, 1959) – New Zealand
- Oramia marplesi Forster, 1964 – New Zealand (Auckland Is.)
- Oramia occidentalis (Marples, 1959) – New Zealand
- Oramia rubrioides (Hogg, 1909) – New Zealand
- Oramia solanderensis Forster & Wilton, 1973 – New Zealand
