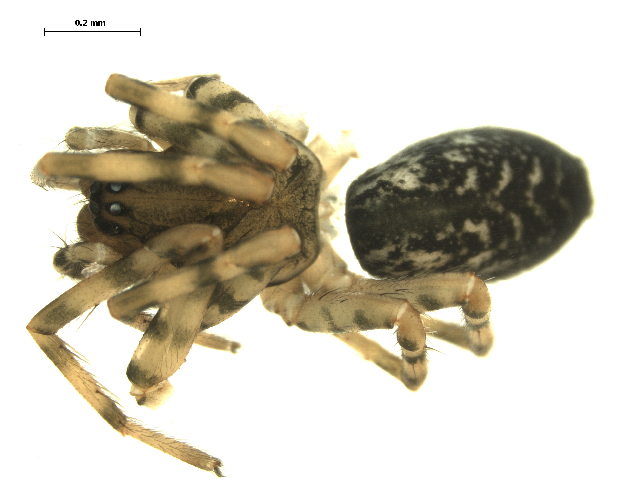
- C. montanus, female

Conservation status
- Secure (NatureServe)

Scientific classification
- Kingdom: Animalia
- Phylum: Arthropoda
- Subphylum: Chelicerata
- Class: Arachnida
- Order: Araneae
- Infraorder: Araneomorphae
- Family: Agelenidae
- Genus: Coras
- Species: C. montanus

Binomial name
- Coras montanus (Emerton, 1890)

= Coras montanus =

Species of spider

Coras montanus is a species of funnel weaver in the spider family Agelenidae. It is found in the United States and Canada.
