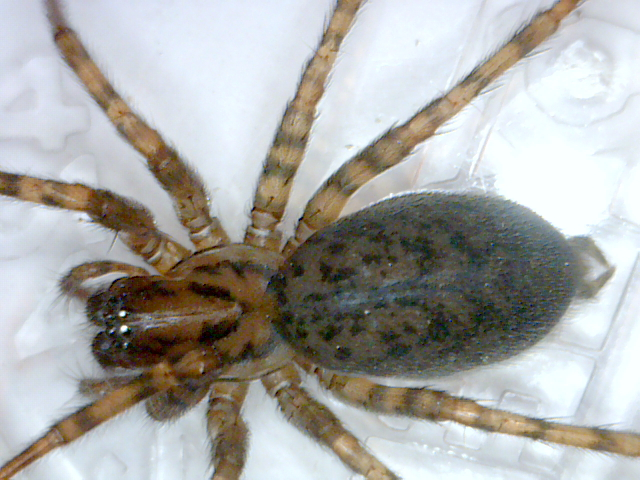
- Coras sp. (C. medicinalis?)

Scientific classification
- Kingdom: Animalia
- Phylum: Arthropoda
- Subphylum: Chelicerata
- Class: Arachnida
- Order: Araneae
- Infraorder: Araneomorphae
- Family: Agelenidae
- Genus: Coras; Simon, 1898

Type species
- C. medicinalis (Hentz, 1821)

Species
- 15, see text

= Coras (spider) =

Genus of spiders

Coras is a genus of funnel weavers first described by Eugène Simon in 1898. It has fifteen described species that occur in eastern North America from Nova Scotia south to Florida. They can be readily distinguished from other genera in the subfamily by their anterior median eyes being larger than the anterior lateral eyes, whereas in other genera the reverse is true, along with a number of more technical reproductive features. The type species is Coras medicinalis (so named because its web was used in medicine).

These spiders are frequently found at or near ground level, or in cellars of houses, where they construct small and rather messy sheet webs on the ground and attached to nearby more elevated items. These webs are small in area and are connected to tubular retreats.

The middle eyes in the lower or front row are as large as, or larger than, the eyes that flank them on the outside. The epigynum has projections at its forward corners. The legs have indistinct gray rings.

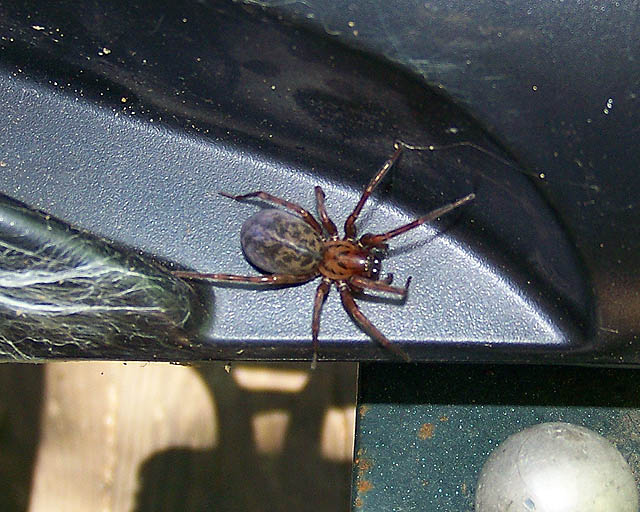
C. medicinalis

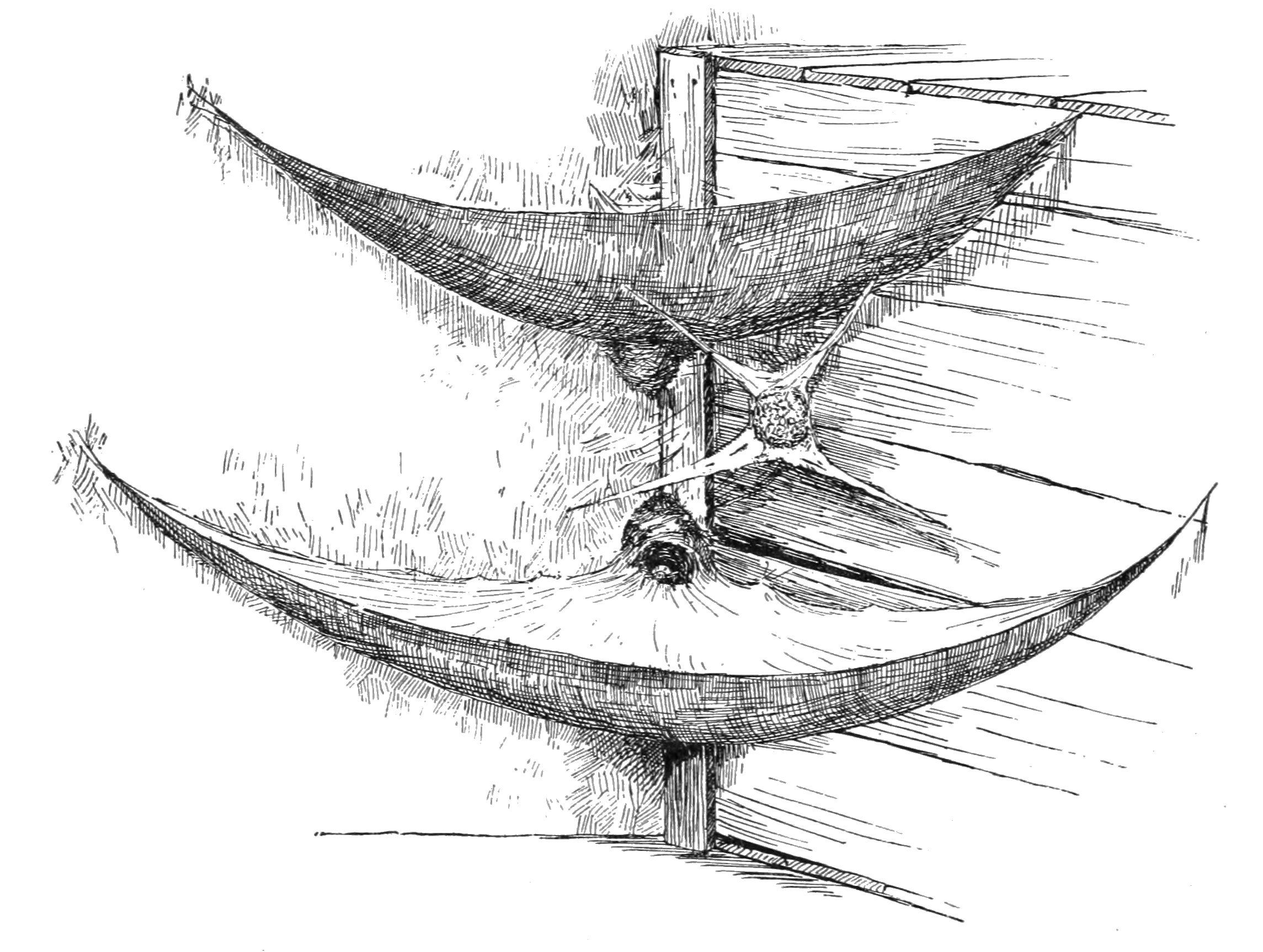
Web and cocoon of C. medicinalis

== Species ==
As of October 2026, it contains fifteen species:

- Coras aerialis Muma, 1946 – USA
- Coras alabama Muma, 1946 – USA
- Coras angularis Muma, 1944 – USA
- Coras cavernorum Barrows, 1940 – USA
- Coras furcatus Muma, 1946 – USA
- Coras juvenilis (Keyserling, 1881) – USA
- Coras kisatchie Muma, 1946 – USA
- Coras lamellosus (Keyserling, 1887) – USA, Canada
- Coras medicinalis (Hentz, 1821) – USA, Canada
- Coras montanus (Emerton, 1890) – USA, Canada
- Coras parallelis Muma, 1944 – USA
- Coras perplexus Muma, 1946 – USA
- Coras seorakensis Seo, 2014 – Korea
- Coras taugynus Chamberlin, 1925 – USA
- Coras tennesseensis Muma, 1946 – USA
