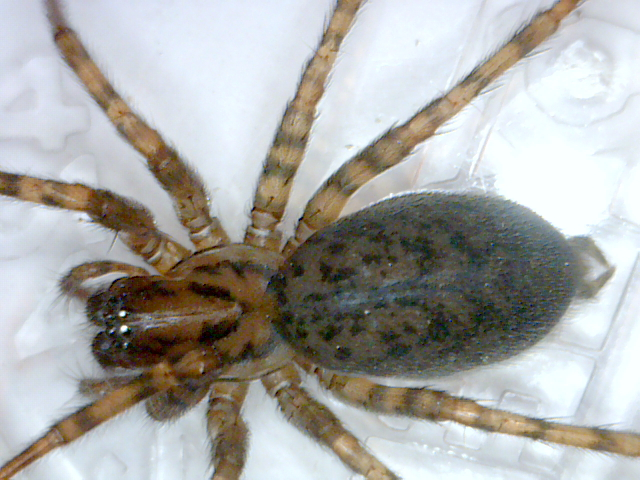

Scientific classification
- Domain: Eukaryota
- Kingdom: Animalia
- Phylum: Arthropoda
- Subphylum: Chelicerata
- Class: Arachnida
- Order: Araneae
- Infraorder: Araneomorphae
- Family: Agelenidae
- Genus: Coras
- Species: C. medicinalis

Binomial name
- Coras medicinalis (Hentz, 1821)

= Coras medicinalis =

Species of spider

Coras medicinalis is a species of funnel weaver in the spider family Agelenidae. It is found in the United States and Canada.

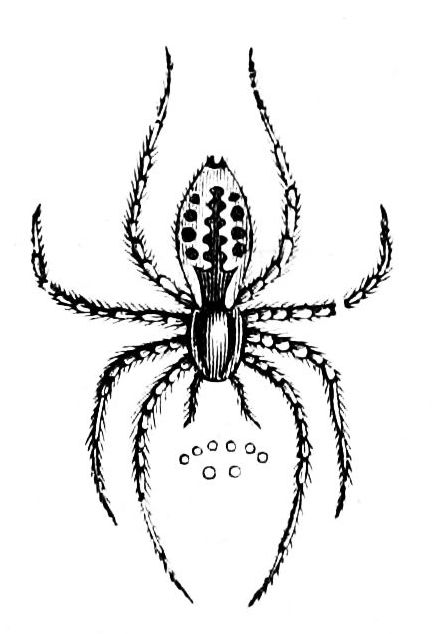
