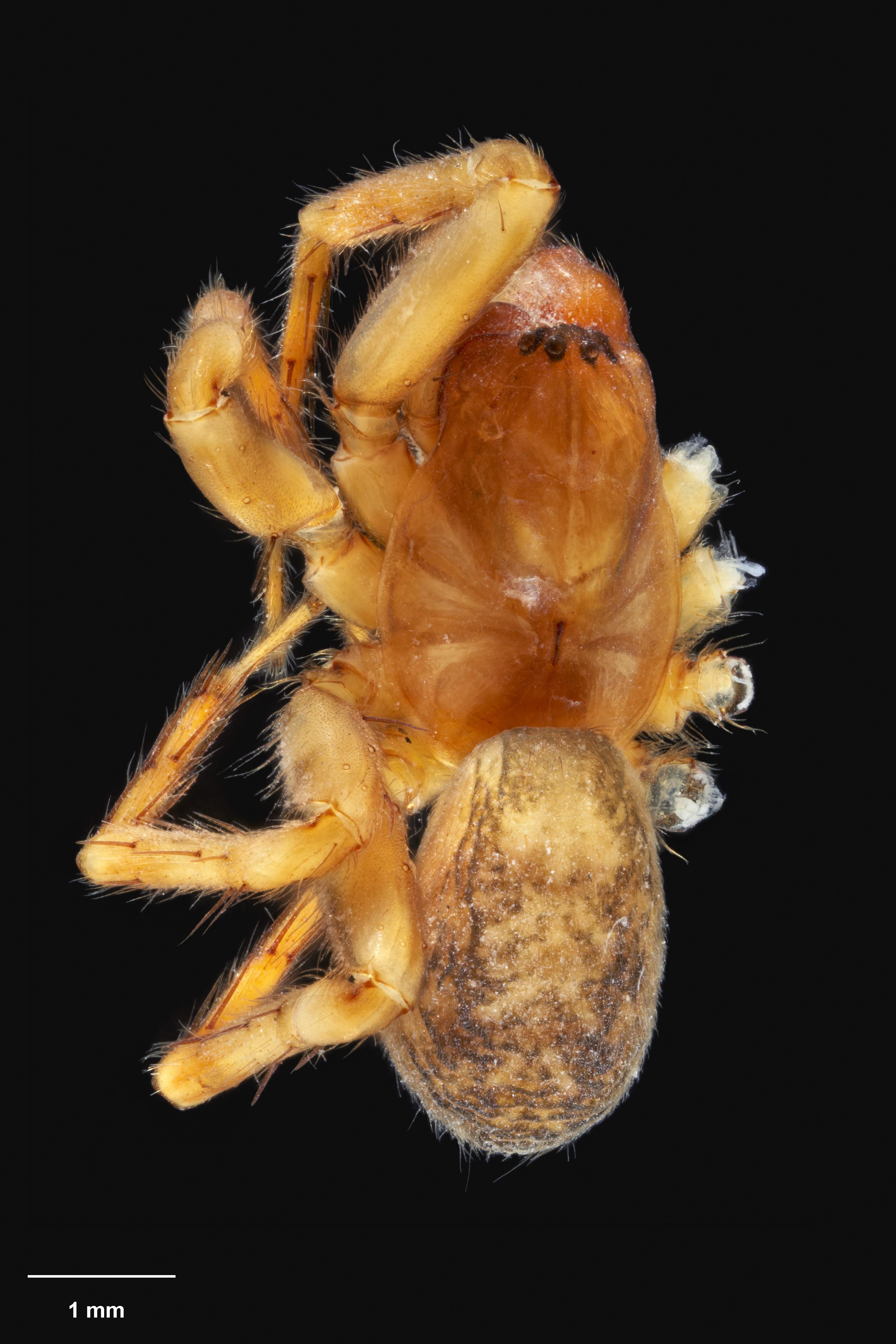

Conservation status
- Data Deficit (NZ TCS)

Scientific classification
- Kingdom: Animalia
- Phylum: Arthropoda
- Subphylum: Chelicerata
- Class: Arachnida
- Order: Araneae
- Infraorder: Araneomorphae
- Family: Agelenidae
- Genus: Neorepukia
- Species: N. hama

Binomial name
- Neorepukia hama Forster & Wilton, 1973

= Neorepukia hama =

Species of spider

Neorepukia hama is a species of Agelenidae that is endemic to New Zealand.

== Taxonomy ==
This species was described in 1973 by Ray Forster and Cecil Wilton from a female specimen. The holotype is stored in Te Papa Museum under registration number AS.000036.

== Description ==
The female is recorded at 6.32mm in length. The carapace and legs are coloured orange brown. The abdomen is shaded blackish brown.

== Distribution ==
This species is only known from Wellington, New Zealand.

== Conservation status ==
Under the New Zealand Threat Classification System, this species is listed as "Data Deficient" with the qualifiers of "Data Poor: Size" and "Data Poor: Trend".
