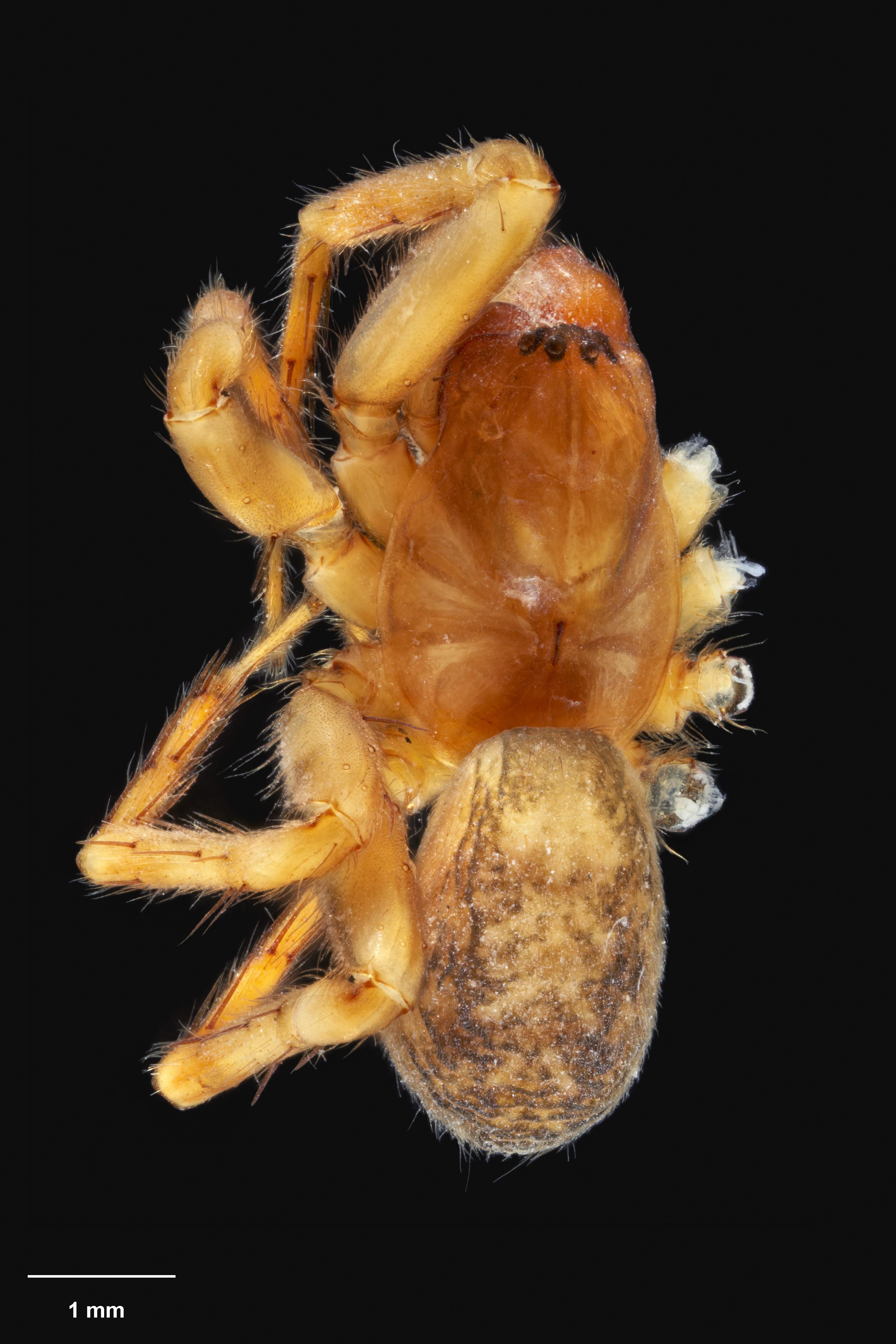
- Neorepukia hama holotype specimen

Scientific classification
- Kingdom: Animalia
- Phylum: Arthropoda
- Subphylum: Chelicerata
- Class: Arachnida
- Order: Araneae
- Infraorder: Araneomorphae
- Family: Agelenidae
- Genus: Neorepukia; Forster & Wilton, 1973

Type species
- N. pilama Forster & Wilton, 1973

Species
- N. hama Forster & Wilton, 1973 – New Zealand; N. pilama Forster & Wilton, 1973 – New Zealand

= Neorepukia =

Genus of spiders

Neorepukia is a genus of South Pacific funnel weavers first described by Raymond Robert Forster & C. L. Wilton in 1973. As of October 2026 it contains only two species.
