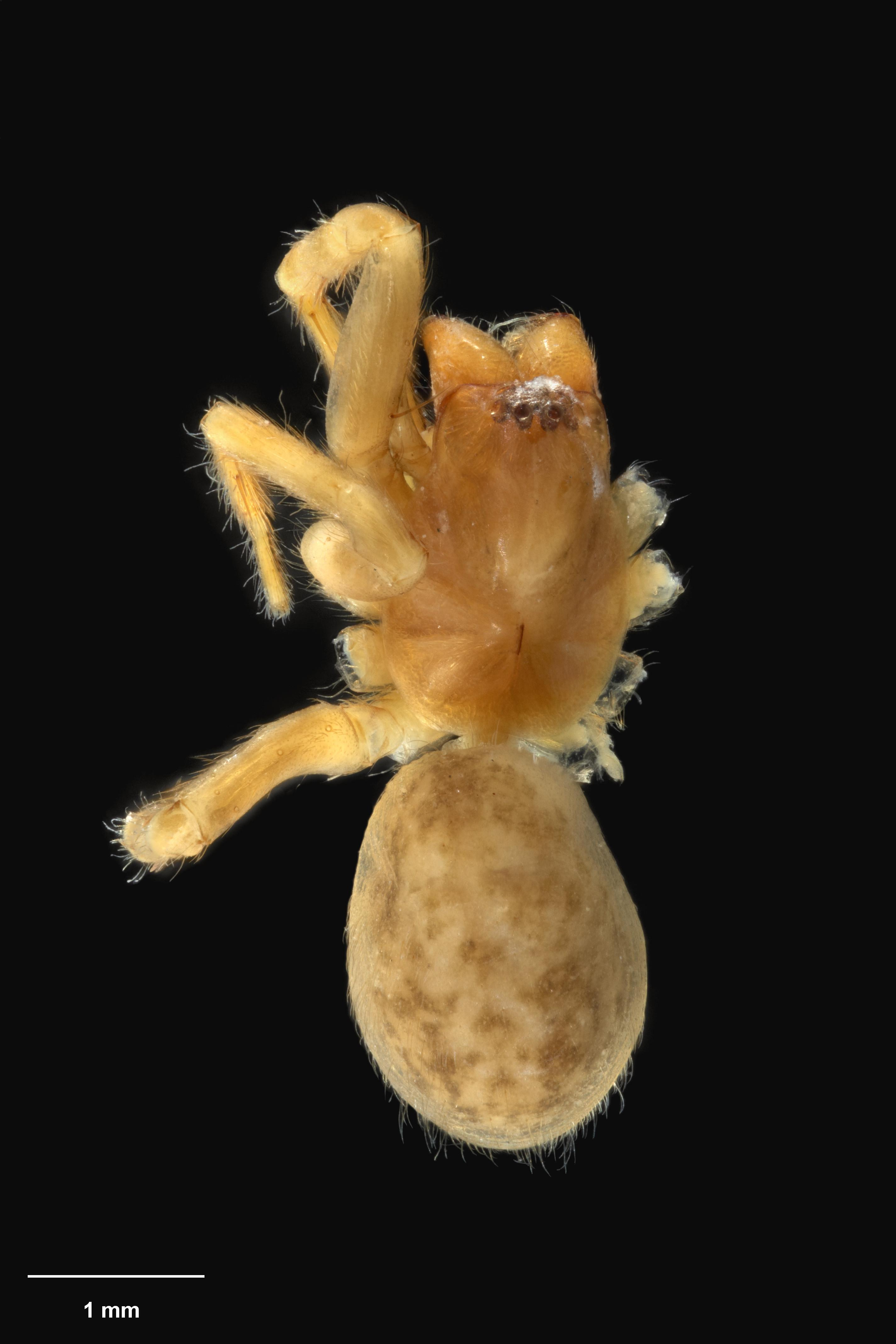

Conservation status
- Data Deficit (NZ TCS)

Scientific classification
- Kingdom: Animalia
- Phylum: Arthropoda
- Subphylum: Chelicerata
- Class: Arachnida
- Order: Araneae
- Infraorder: Araneomorphae
- Family: Agelenidae
- Genus: Neorepukia
- Species: N. pilama

Binomial name
- Neorepukia pilama Forster & Wilton, 1973

= Neorepukia pilama =

Species of spider

Neorepukia pilama is a species of Agelenidae that is endemic to New Zealand.

== Taxonomy ==
This species was described in 1973 by Ray Forster and Cecil Wilton from a female specimen. The holotype is stored in Te Papa Museum under registration number AS.000085.

== Description ==
The female is recorded at 4.56mm in length. The cephalothorax is coloured pale yellow and has a dark brown band dorsally. The legs are yellow brown with dark bands. The abdomen is creamy and heavily shaded blackish brown in spots.

== Distribution ==
This species is only known from Stephens Island, New Zealand.

== Conservation status ==
Under the New Zealand Threat Classification System, this species is listed as "Data Deficient" with the qualifiers of "Data Poor: Size" and "Data Poor: Trend".
