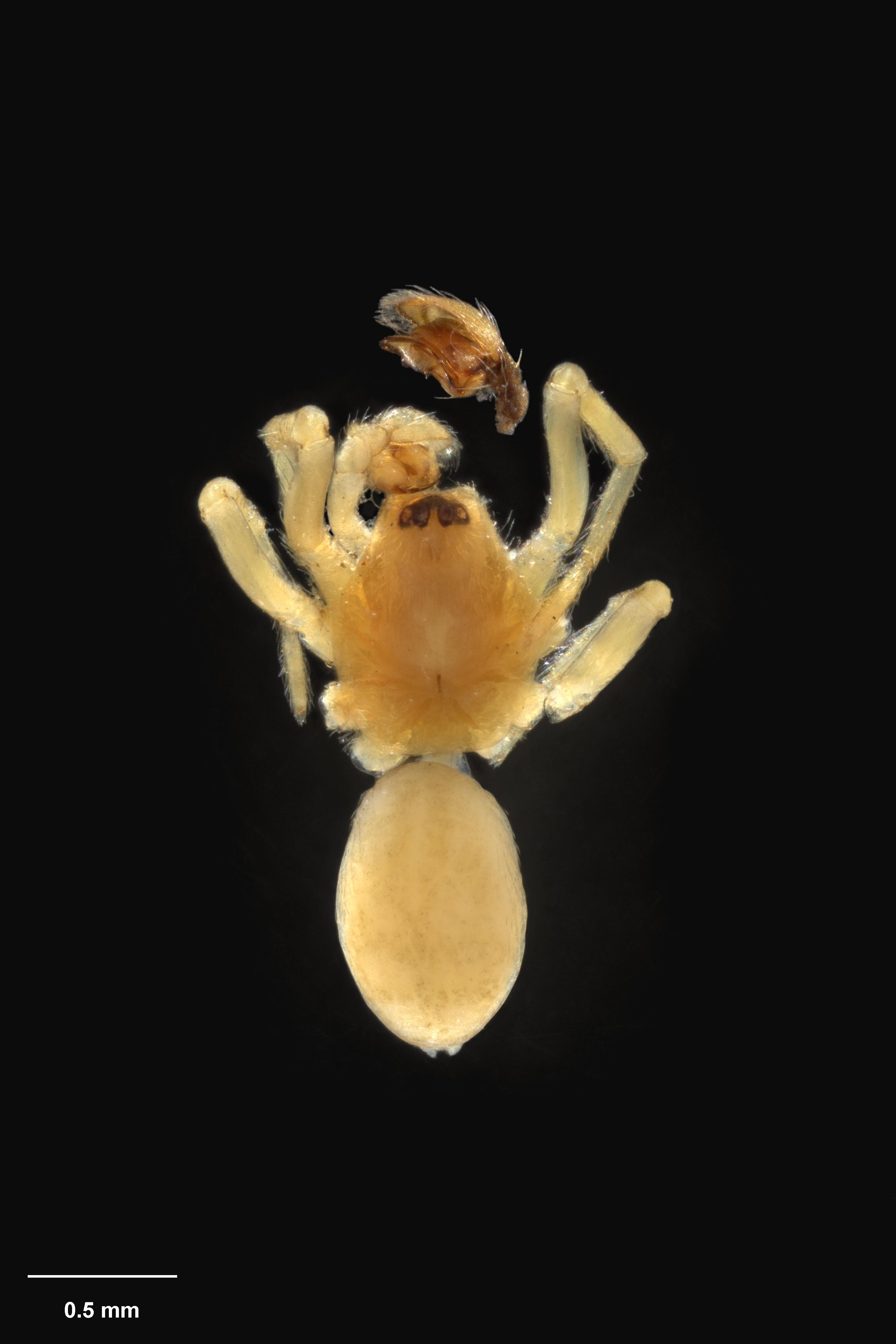

Conservation status
- Data Deficit (NZ TCS)

Scientific classification
- Kingdom: Animalia
- Phylum: Arthropoda
- Subphylum: Chelicerata
- Class: Arachnida
- Order: Araneae
- Infraorder: Araneomorphae
- Family: Agelenidae
- Genus: Porotaka
- Species: P. florae

Binomial name
- Porotaka florae Forster & Wilton, 1973

= Porotaka florae =

Species of spider

Porotaka florae is a species of Agelenidae that is endemic to New Zealand.

== Taxonomy ==
This species was described in 1973 by Ray Forster and Cecil Wilton from male and female specimens. The holotype is stored in Te Papa Museum under registration number AS.000029.

== Description ==
The female is recorded at 1.56mm in length whereas the male is 1.8mm. The cephalothorax is coloured yellow brown with faint shading. The legs are orange brown. The abdomen is creamy with dark shading.

== Distribution ==
This species is only known from Nelson, New Zealand.

== Conservation status ==
Under the New Zealand Threat Classification System, this species is listed as "Data Deficient" with the qualifiers of "Data Poor: Size", "Data Poor: Trend" and "One Location".
