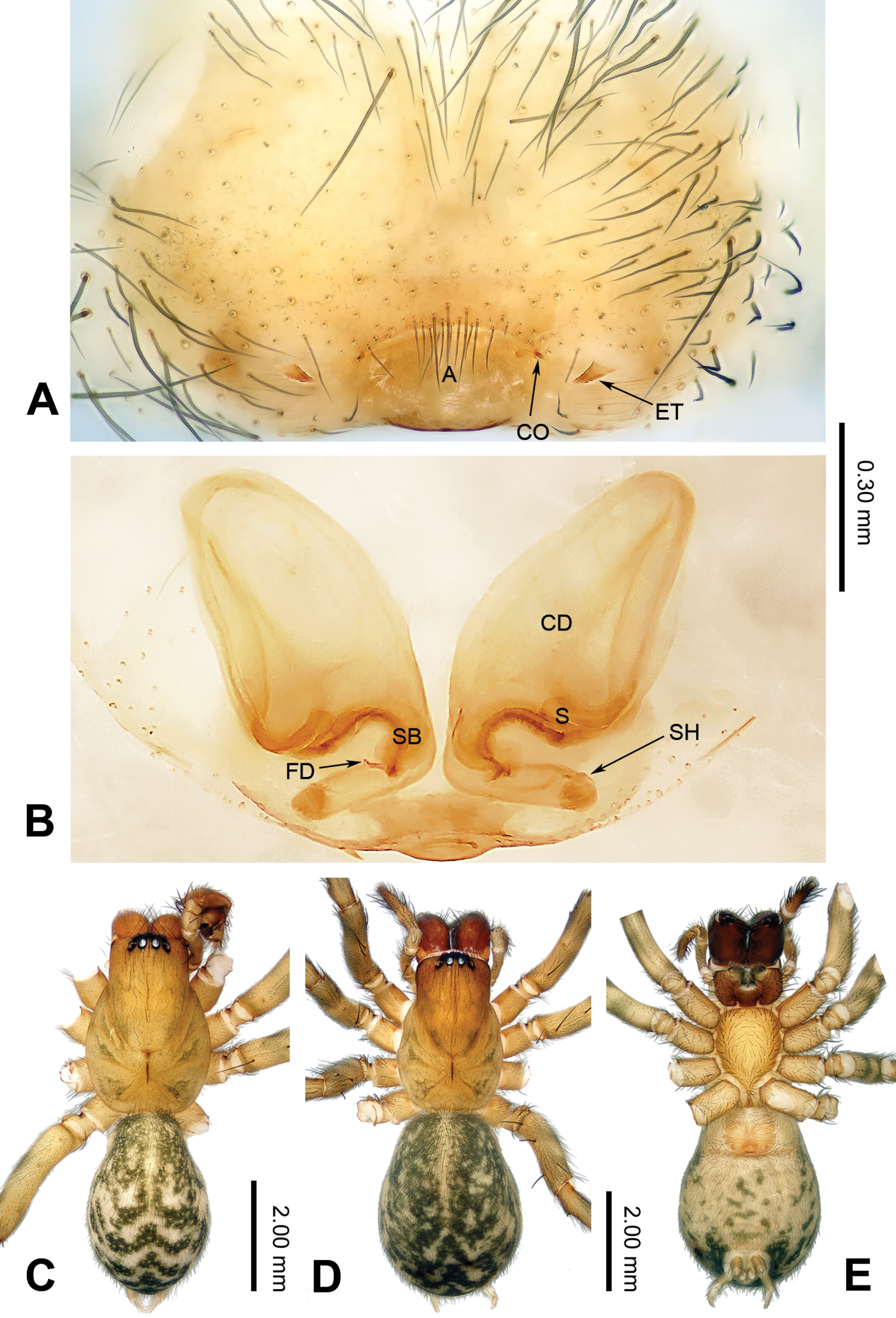
- Guilotes ludiensis

Scientific classification
- Kingdom: Animalia
- Phylum: Arthropoda
- Subphylum: Chelicerata
- Class: Arachnida
- Order: Araneae
- Infraorder: Araneomorphae
- Family: Agelenidae
- Genus: Guilotes; Zhao & S. Q. Li, 2018

Type species
- G. ludiensis Zhao & S. Q. Li, 2018

Species
- 4, see text

= Guilotes =

Genus of spiders

Guilotes is a genus of east Asian funnel weavers. It was first described by B. Li, Z. Zhao and H. F. Chen in 2018, and it has only been found in Chinese caves. The name is a combination of the Pinyin "Gui" (short for "Guangxi") referring to the Guangxi Zhuang Autonomous Region where it was found, and Notiocoelotes, a closely related genus.

== Species ==
As of October 2026 it contains four species:

- G. ludiensis Zhao & S. Q. Li, 2018 (type) – China
- G. qingshitanensis Zhao & S. Q. Li, 2018 – China
- G. xingpingensis Zhao & S. Q. Li, 2018 – China
- G. yandongensis Zhao & S. Q. Li, 2018 – China

== See also ==
- Notiocoelotes
