= Notiocoelotes =

Scientific classification
- Kingdom: Animalia
- Phylum: Arthropoda
- Subphylum: Chelicerata
- Class: Arachnida
- Order: Araneae
- Infraorder: Araneomorphae
- Family: Agelenidae
- Genus: Notiocoelotes; Li

Type species
- Notiocoelotes palinitropus

Species
- 13, see text

Genus of spiders

Notiocoelotes is a genus of spiders in the family Agelenidae. It was first described in 2008 by Wang, Xu & Li.

== Species ==
As of October 2026, this genus includes thirteen species:

- Notiocoelotes laosensis Wang, Xu & Li, 2008 – Laos
- Notiocoelotes lingulatus Wang, Xu & Li, 2008 – China
- Notiocoelotes maoganensis Zhao & Li, 2016 – China
- Notiocoelotes membranaceus Liu & Li, 2010 – China
- Notiocoelotes orbiculatus Liu & Li, 2010 – China
- Notiocoelotes palinitropus (Zhu & Wang, 1994) – China
- Notiocoelotes parvitriangulus Liu, Li & Pham, 2010 – Vietnam
- Notiocoelotes pseudolingulatus Liu & Li, 2010 – China
- Notiocoelotes pseudovietnamensis Liu, Li & Pham, 2010 – Vietnam
- Notiocoelotes qiongzhongensis Zhao & Li, 2016 – China
- Notiocoelotes sparus (Dankittipakul, Chami-Kranon & Wang, 2005) – Thailand
- Notiocoelotes spirellus Liu & Li, 2010 – China
- Notiocoelotes vietnamensis Wang, Xu & Li, 2008 – Vietnam
