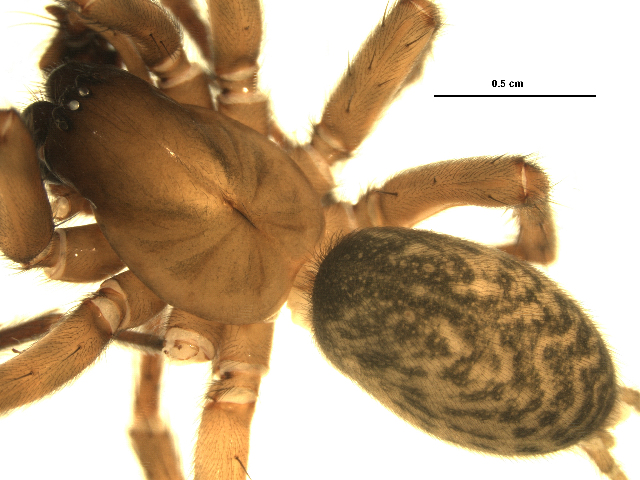
- W. calcaratus, male

Scientific classification
- Domain: Eukaryota
- Kingdom: Animalia
- Phylum: Arthropoda
- Subphylum: Chelicerata
- Class: Arachnida
- Order: Araneae
- Infraorder: Araneomorphae
- Family: Agelenidae
- Genus: Wadotes
- Species: W. calcaratus

Binomial name
- Wadotes calcaratus (Keyserling, 1887)

= Wadotes calcaratus =

Species of spider

Wadotes calcaratus is a species of funnel weaver in the family of spiders known as Agelenidae. It is found in the United States and Canada.
