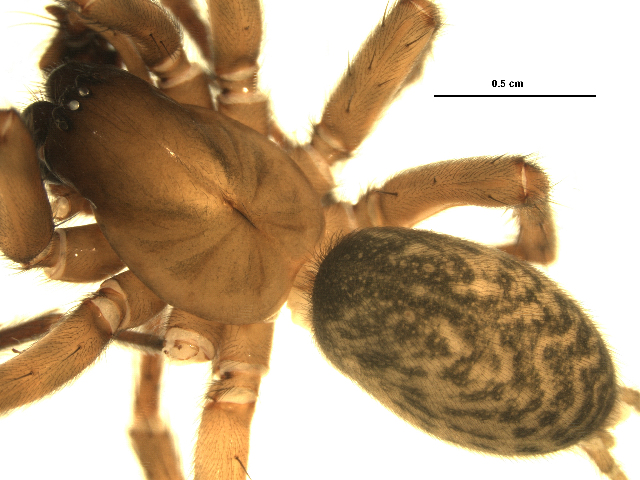
- W. calcaratus, male

Scientific classification
- Kingdom: Animalia
- Phylum: Arthropoda
- Subphylum: Chelicerata
- Class: Arachnida
- Order: Araneae
- Infraorder: Araneomorphae
- Family: Agelenidae
- Genus: Wadotes; Chamberlin, 1925

Type species
- W. dixiensis Chamberlin, 1925

Species
- 11, see text

= Wadotes =

Genus of spiders

Wadotes is a genus of North American funnel weavers first described by R. V. Chamberlin in 1925.

== Species ==
As of October 2026 it contains eleven species:

- Wadotes bimucronatus (Simon, 1898) – USA
- Wadotes calcaratus (Keyserling, 1887) – USA, Canada
- Wadotes carinidactylus Bennett, 1987 – USA
- Wadotes deceptis Bennett, 1987 – USA
- Wadotes dixiensis Chamberlin, 1925 – USA
- Wadotes georgiensis Howell, 1974 – USA
- Wadotes hybridus (Emerton, 1890) – USA, Canada
- Wadotes mumai Bennett, 1987 – USA
- Wadotes saturnus Bennett, 1987 – USA
- Wadotes tennesseensis Gertsch, 1936 – USA
- Wadotes willsi Bennett, 1987 – USA
