= List of Migidae species =

This page lists all described species of the spider family Migidae accepted by the World Spider Catalog as of January 2021:

== B ==
=== Bertmainius ===
Bertmainius Harvey, Main, Rix & Cooper, 2015

- B. colonus Harvey, Main, Rix & Cooper, 2015 — Australia (Western Australia)
- B. monachus Harvey, Main, Rix & Cooper, 2015 — Australia (Western Australia)
- B. mysticus Harvey, Main, Rix & Cooper, 2015 — Australia (Western Australia)
- B. opimus Harvey, Main, Rix & Cooper, 2015 — Australia (Western Australia)
- B. pandus Harvey, Main, Rix & Cooper, 2015 — Australia (Western Australia)
- B. tingle (Main, 1991) (type) — Australia (Western Australia)
- B. tumidus Harvey, Main, Rix & Cooper, 2015 — Australia (Western Australia)

== C ==
=== Calathotarsus ===
Calathotarsus

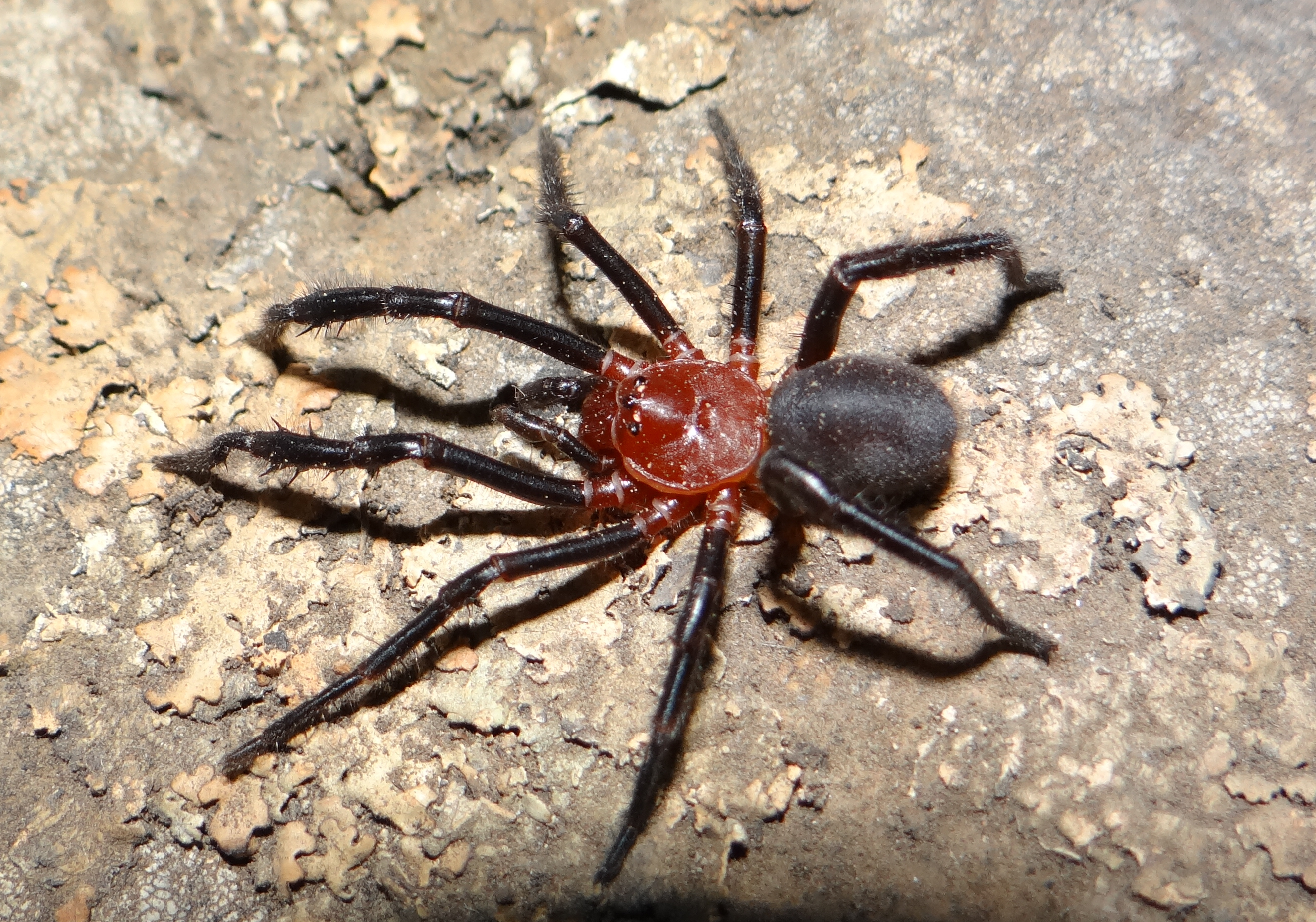
Calathotarsus simoni, male

Calathotarsus Simon, 1903

- C. coronatus Simon, 1903 (type) — Chile
- C. fangioi Ferretti, Soresi, González & Arnedo, 2019 — Argentina
- C. pihuychen Goloboff, 1991 — Chile
- C. simoni Schiapelli & Gerschman, 1975 — Argentina

== G ==
=== Goloboffia ===
Goloboffia Griswold & Ledford, 2001

- G. biberi Ferretti, Ríos-Tamayo & Goloboff, 2019 — Chile
- G. griswoldi Ferretti, Ríos-Tamayo & Goloboff, 2019 — Chile
- G. megadeth Ferretti, Ríos-Tamayo & Goloboff, 2019 — Chile
- G. pachelbeli Ferretti, Ríos-Tamayo & Goloboff, 2019 — Chile
- G. vellardi (Zapfe, 1961) (type) — Chile

== H ==
=== Heteromigas ===
Heteromigas Hogg, 1902

- H. dovei Hogg, 1902 (type) — Australia (Tasmania)
- H. terraereginae Raven, 1984 — Australia (Queensland)

== M ==
=== Mallecomigas ===
Mallecomigas Goloboff & Platnick, 1987

- M. schlingeri Goloboff & Platnick, 1987 (type) — Chile

=== Micromesomma ===
Micromesomma Pocock, 1895

- M. cowani Pocock, 1895 (type) — Madagascar

=== Migas ===
Migas

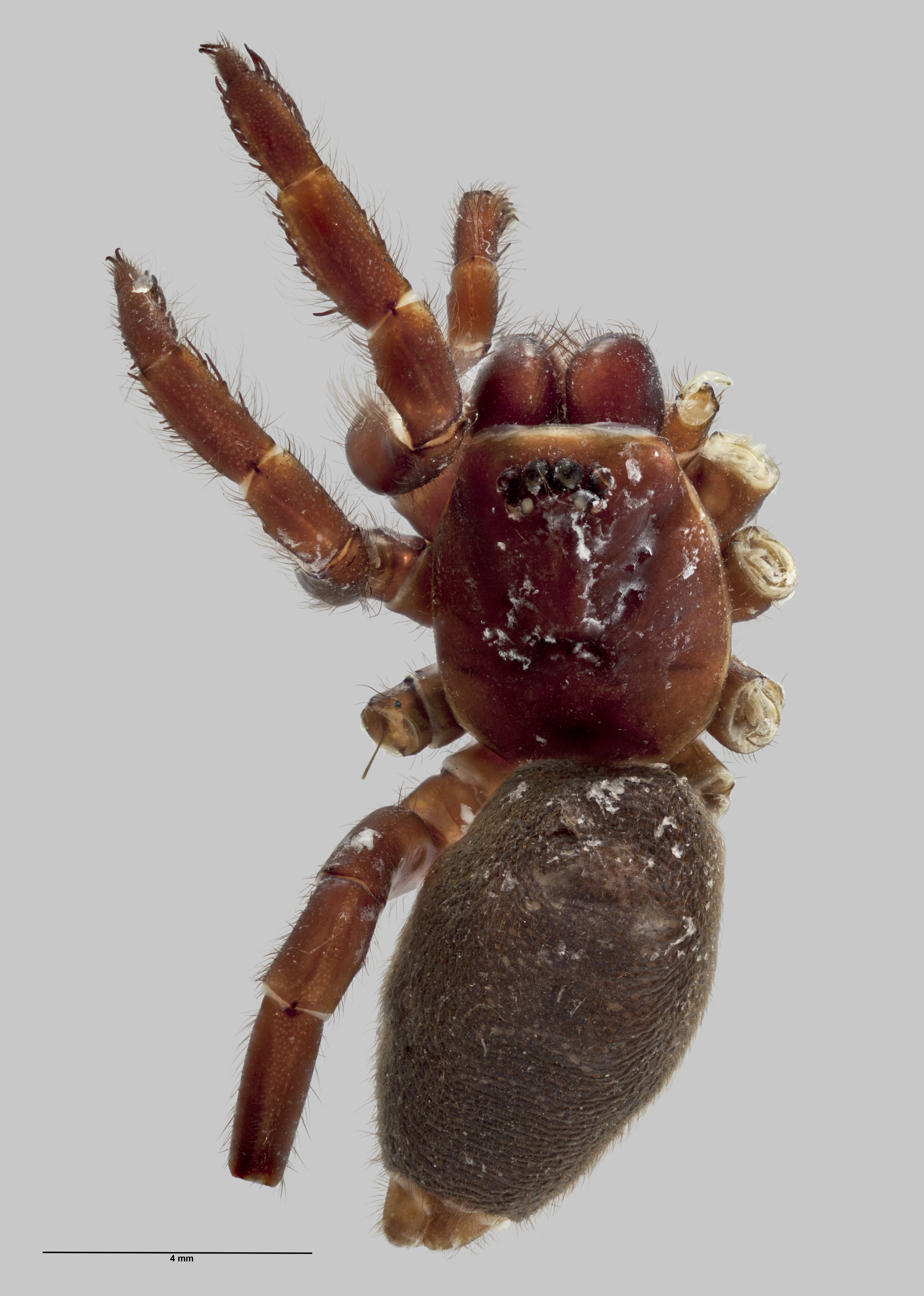
Migas borealis

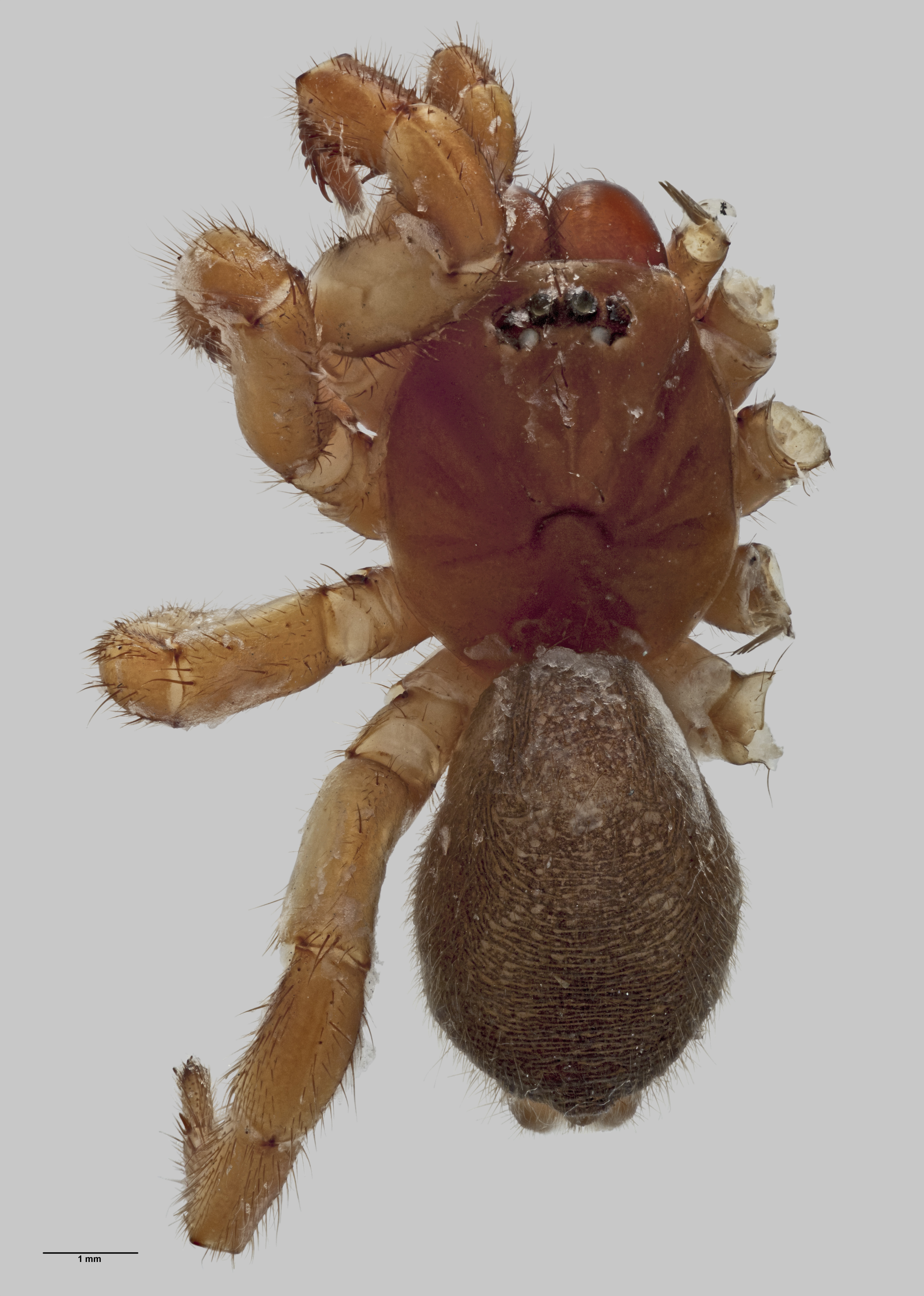
Migas insularis

Migas L. Koch, 1873

- M. affinis Berland, 1924 — New Caledonia
- M. australis Wilton, 1968 — New Zealand
- M. borealis Wilton, 1968 — New Zealand
- M. cambridgei Wilton, 1968 — New Zealand
- M. cantuarius Wilton, 1968 — New Zealand
- M. centralis Wilton, 1968 — New Zealand
- M. cumberi Wilton, 1968 — New Zealand
- M. distinctus O. Pickard-Cambridge, 1880 — New Zealand
- M. gatenbyi Wilton, 1968 — New Zealand
- M. giveni Wilton, 1968 — New Zealand
- M. goyeni Wilton, 1968 — New Zealand
- M. hesperus Wilton, 1968 — New Zealand
- M. hollowayi Wilton, 1968 — New Zealand
- M. insularis Wilton, 1968 — New Zealand
- M. kirki Wilton, 1968 — New Zealand
- M. kochi Wilton, 1968 — New Zealand
- M. linburnensis Wilton, 1968 — New Zealand
- M. lomasi Wilton, 1968 — New Zealand
- M. marplesi Wilton, 1968 — New Zealand
- M. minor Wilton, 1968 — New Zealand
- M. nitens Hickman, 1927 — Australia (Tasmania)
- M. otari Wilton, 1968 — New Zealand
- M. paradoxus L. Koch, 1873 (type) — New Zealand
- M. plomleyi Raven & Churchill, 1989 — Australia (Tasmania)
- M. quintus Wilton, 1968 — New Zealand
- M. sandageri Goyen, 1890 — New Zealand
- M. saxatilis Wilton, 1968 — New Zealand
- M. secundus Wilton, 1968 — New Zealand
- M. solitarius Wilton, 1968 — New Zealand
- M. taierii Todd, 1945 — New Zealand
- M. tasmani Wilton, 1968 — New Zealand
- M. toddae Wilton, 1968 — New Zealand
- M. tuhoe Wilton, 1968 — New Zealand
- M. variapalpus Raven, 1984 — Australia (Queensland)

=== Moggridgea ===
Moggridgea

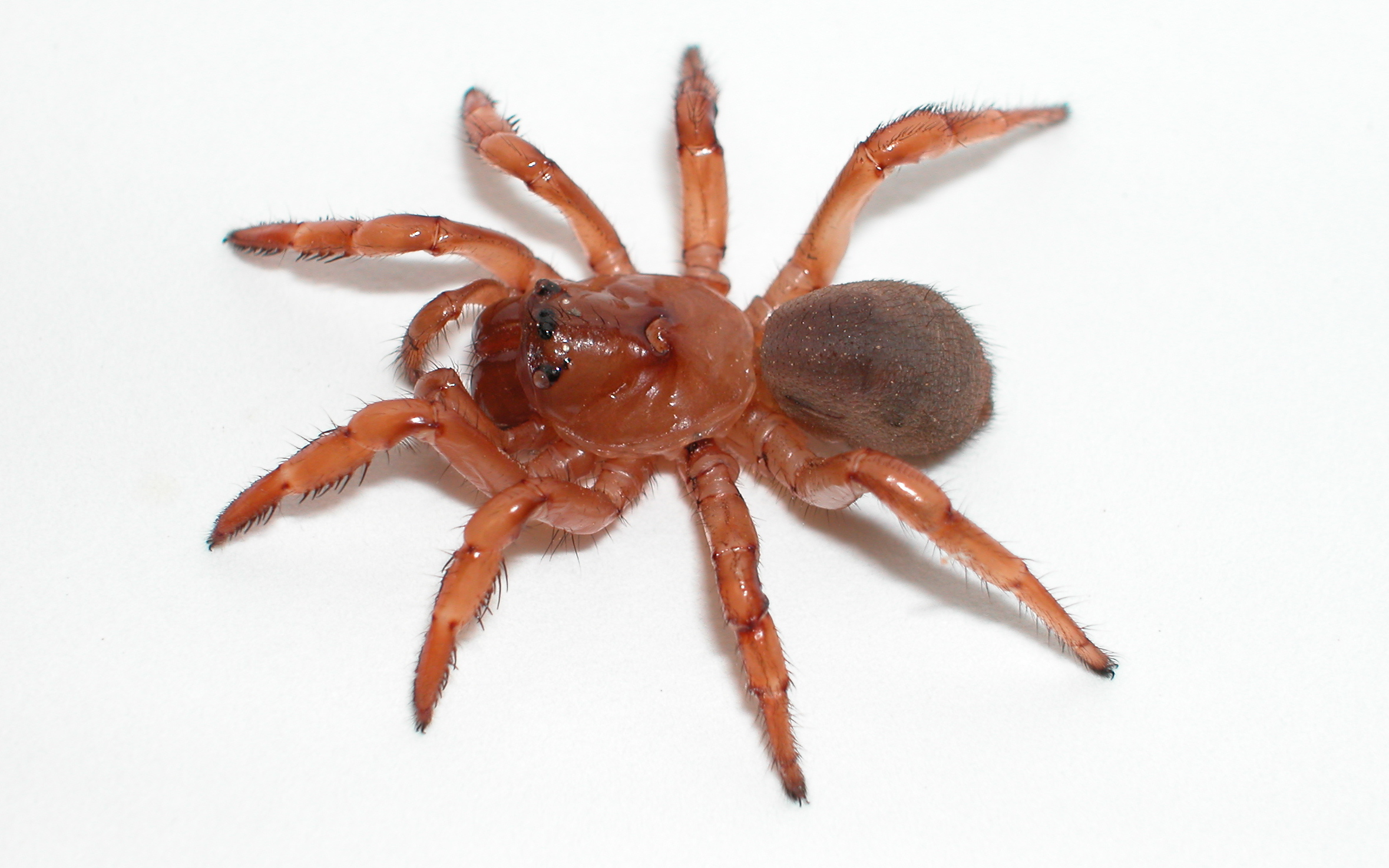
Moggridgea sp.

Moggridgea O. Pickard-Cambridge, 1875

- M. albimaculata Hewitt, 1925 — South Africa
- M. ampullata Griswold, 1987 — South Africa
- M. anactenidia Griswold, 1987 — Cameroon
- M. breyeri Hewitt, 1915 — South Africa
- M. clypeostriata Benoit, 1962 — Congo
- M. crudeni Hewitt, 1913 — South Africa
- M. dyeri O. Pickard-Cambridge, 1875 (type) — South Africa
- M. eremicola Griswold, 1987 — Namibia
- M. intermedia Hewitt, 1913 — South Africa
- M. leipoldti Purcell, 1903 — South Africa
- M. loistata Griswold, 1987 — South Africa
- M. microps Hewitt, 1915 — South Africa
- M. mordax Purcell, 1903 — South Africa
- M. nesiota Griswold, 1987 — Comoros
- M. occidua Simon, 1907 — São Tomé and Príncipe
- M. pallida Hewitt, 1914 — Namibia
- M. paucispina Hewitt, 1916 — South Africa
- M. peringueyi Simon, 1903 — South Africa
- M. pseudocrudeni Hewitt, 1919 — South Africa
- M. purpurea Lawrence, 1928 — Namibia
- M. pymi Hewitt, 1914 — Zimbabwe, South Africa
- M. quercina Simon, 1903 — South Africa
- M. rainbowi (Pulleine, 1919) — Australia (South Australia)
- M. rupicola Hewitt, 1913 — South Africa
- M. rupicoloides Hewitt, 1914 — South Africa
- M. socotra Griswold, 1987 — Yemen (Socotra)
- M. tanypalpa Griswold, 1987 — Angola
- M. teresae Griswold, 1987 — South Africa
- M. terrestris Hewitt, 1914 — South Africa
- M. terricola Simon, 1903 — South Africa
- M. verruculata Griswold, 1987 — Congo
- M. whytei Pocock, 1897 — Central Africa

== P ==
=== Paramigas ===
Paramigas

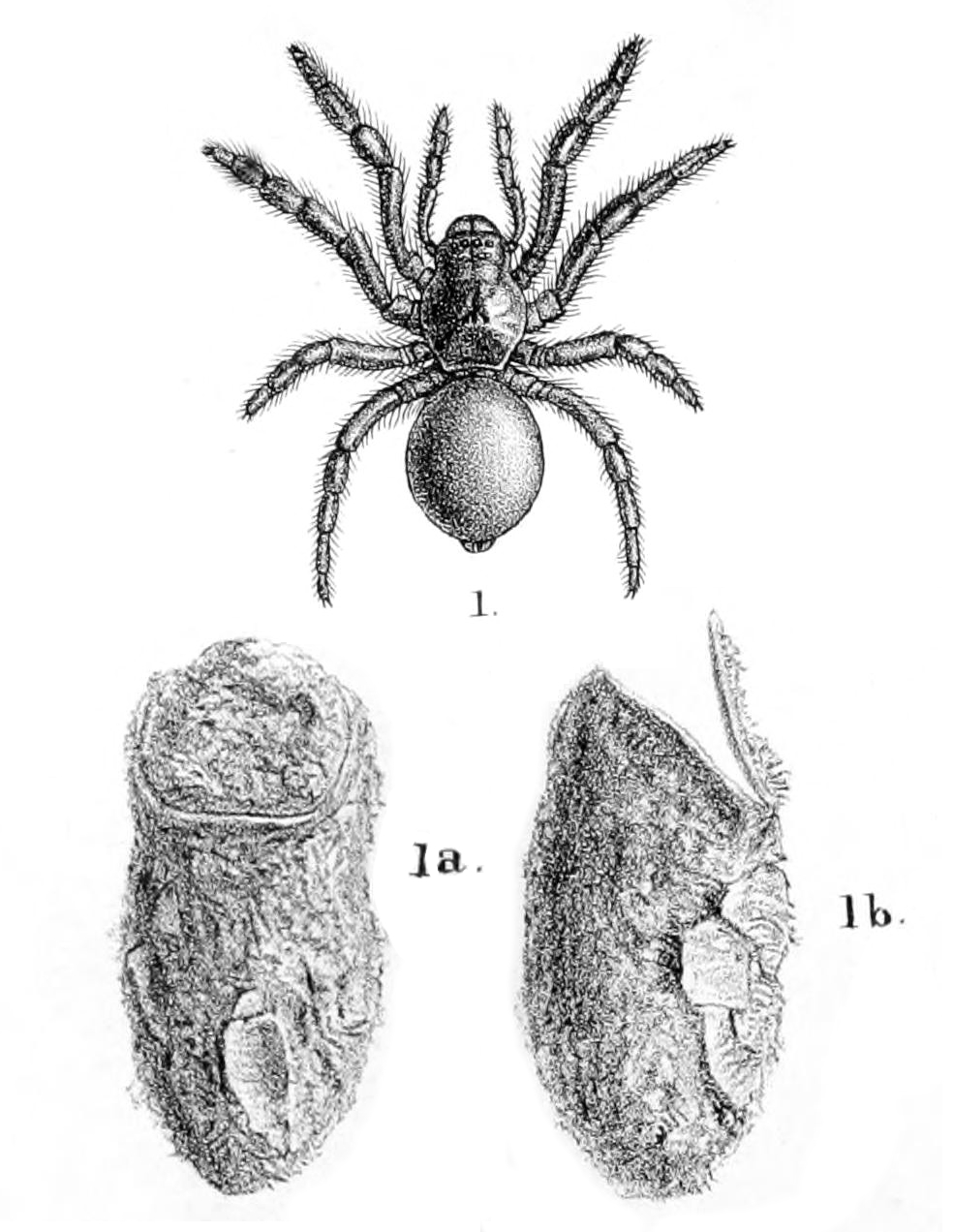
Paramigas subrufus

Paramigas Pocock, 1895

- P. alluaudi (Simon, 1903) — Madagascar
- P. andasibe Raven, 2001 — Madagascar
- P. goodmani Griswold & Ledford, 2001 — Madagascar
- P. macrops Griswold & Ledford, 2001 — Madagascar
- P. manakambus Griswold & Ledford, 2001 — Madagascar
- P. milloti Griswold & Ledford, 2001 — Madagascar
- P. oracle Griswold & Ledford, 2001 — Madagascar
- P. pauliani (Dresco & Canard, 1975) — Madagascar
- P. pectinatus Griswold & Ledford, 2001 — Madagascar
- P. perroti (Simon, 1891) (type) — Madagascar
- P. rothorum Griswold & Ledford, 2001 — Madagascar

=== Poecilomigas ===
Poecilomigas Simon, 1903

- P. abrahami (O. Pickard-Cambridge, 1889) (type) — South Africa
- P. basilleupi Benoit, 1962 — Tanzania
- P. elegans Griswold, 1987 — South Africa

== T ==
=== Thyropoeus ===
Thyropoeus

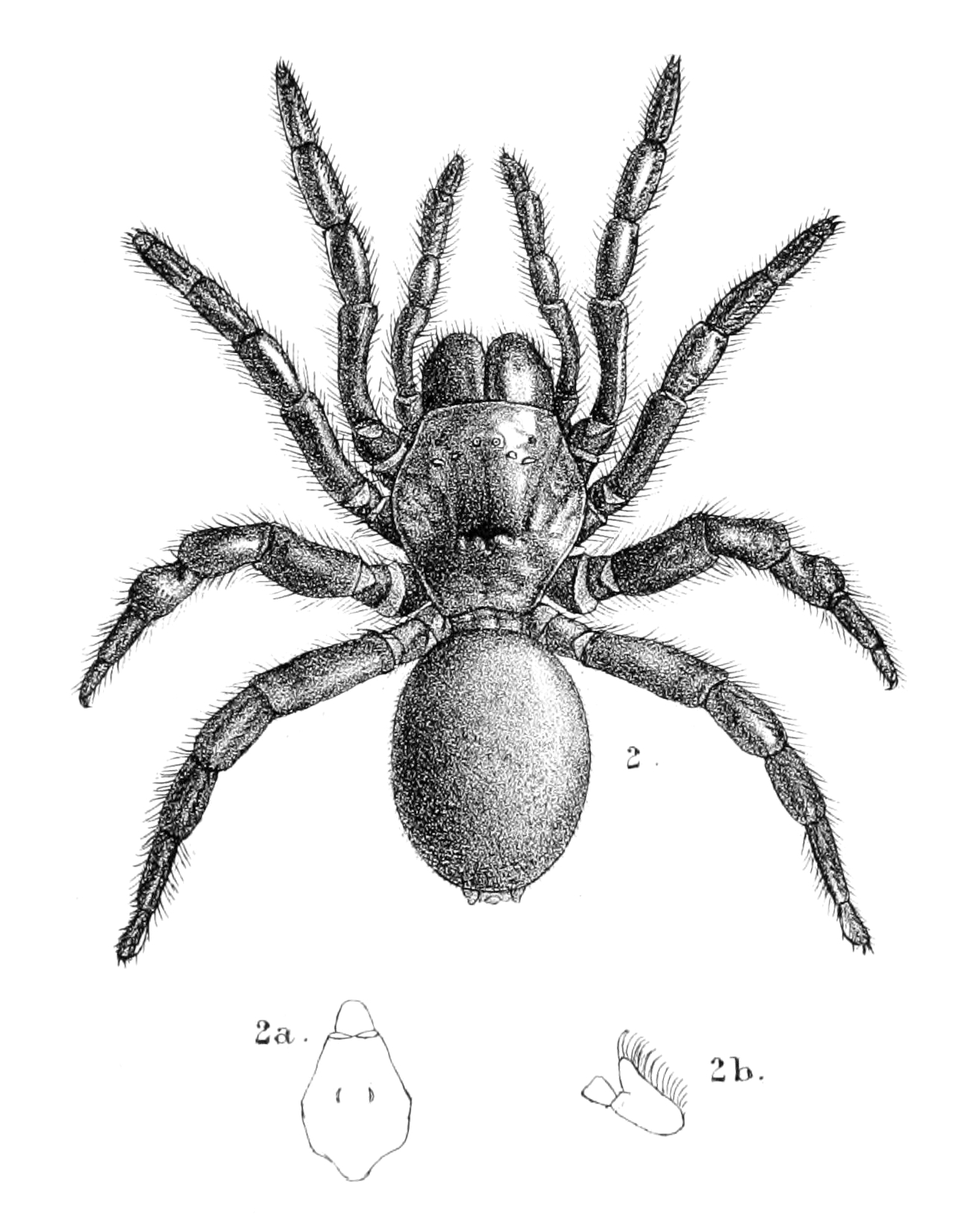
Thyropoeus mirandus

Thyropoeus Pocock, 1895

- T. malagasus (Strand, 1908) — Madagascar
- T. mirandus Pocock, 1895 (type) — Madagascar
