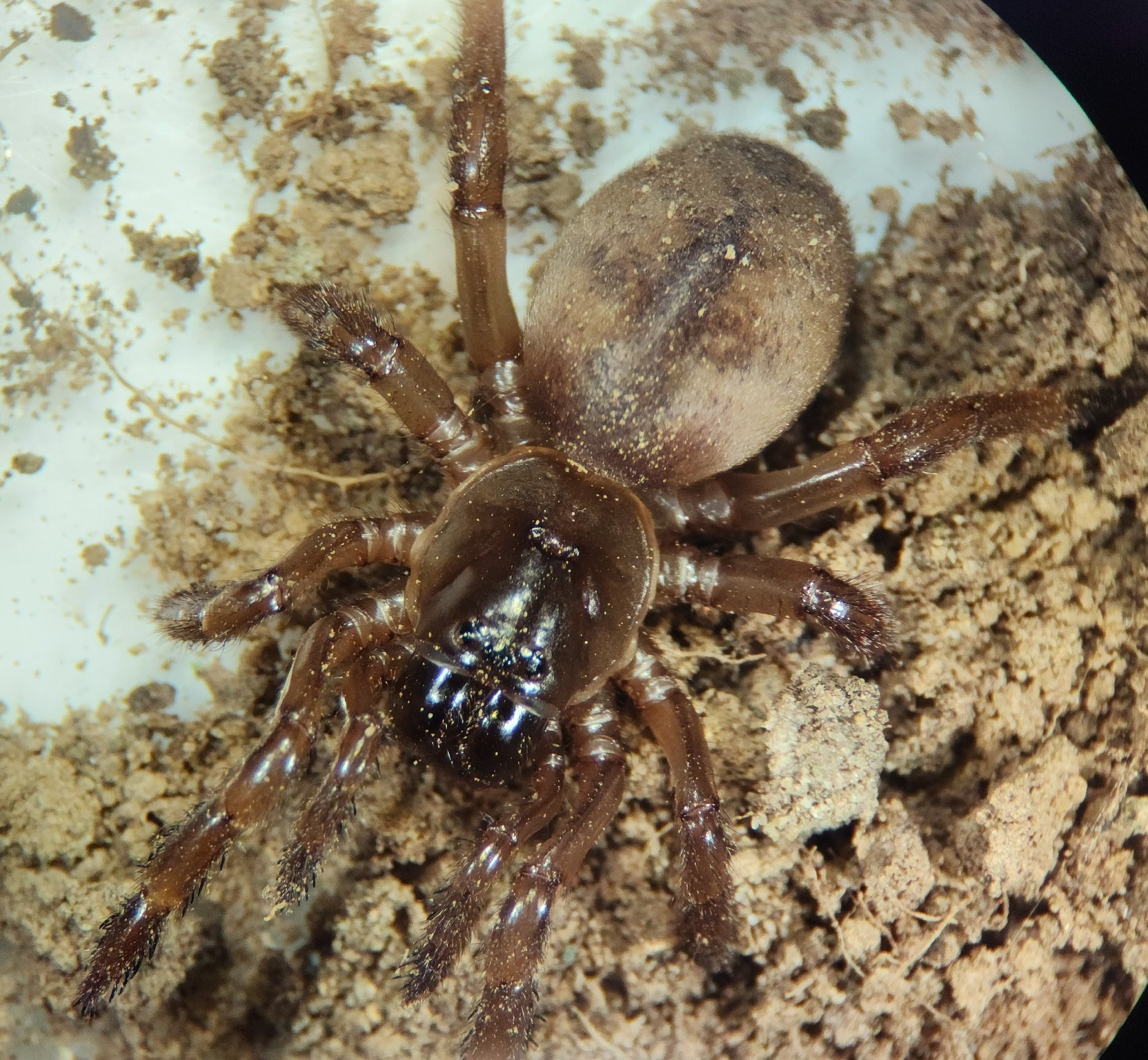

Conservation status
- Nationally Endangered (NZ TCS)

Scientific classification
- Kingdom: Animalia
- Phylum: Arthropoda
- Subphylum: Chelicerata
- Class: Arachnida
- Order: Araneae
- Infraorder: Mygalomorphae
- Family: Migidae
- Genus: Migas
- Species: M. taierii

Binomial name
- Migas taierii Todd, 1945

= Migas taierii =

Species of spider

Migas taierii is a species of mygalomorph spider endemic to New Zealand.

== Taxonomy ==
This species was described in 1945 by arachnologist Valerie Todd from male and female specimens collected in Otago. It was redescribed in 1968 by arachnologist Cecil Wilton. The holotype is stored in Otago Museum.

== Description ==
The female is recorded at 17.7 mm in length. The carapace and legs are pale orange brown. The abdomen is pale brownish grey with some purplish grey dorsally. The male is recorded at 9.2 mm in length. The colours are similar to that of the female. Like other Migas, it is difficult to identify without examining minute anatomical features such as the female reproductive system

== Distribution and habitat ==
This species is only known from Taieri Mouth in Otago, New Zealand. They live in sandy banks in burrows above the high tide.

== Life history ==
The eggs have been recorded from November to March. The number of eggs in a burrow varies somewhat, but has been recorded up to 157 eggs. The amount of time it takes eggs to hatch has been recorded at five weeks in one record. Roughly a month after hatching, the spiderlings leave the mothers burrow and dig their own. The spiders burrows are known to be around 8.9 cm in length.

== Conservation status and threats ==
Under the New Zealand Threat Classification System, this species is listed as "Nationally Endangered" with the qualifiers of "Climate Impact", "Data Poor: Size", "Data Poor: Trend" and "One Location". This species is particularly vulnerable as its only known population is estimated to be around 300 individuals. Their only known population is located in an area that is prone to erosion, further threatening this species.
