= Migas distinctus =

Conservation status
- Not Threatened (NZ TCS)

Scientific classification
- Kingdom: Animalia
- Phylum: Arthropoda
- Subphylum: Chelicerata
- Class: Arachnida
- Order: Araneae
- Infraorder: Mygalomorphae
- Family: Migidae
- Genus: Migas
- Species: M. distinctus

Binomial name
- Migas distinctus (O. Pickard-Cambridge, 1880)

Species of spider

Migas distinctus is a species of mygalomorph spider endemic to New Zealand.

== Taxonomy ==
This species was described in 1880 by Octavius Pickard-Cambridge from a single immature female specimen collected in Dunedin. It was mostly revised in 1968 by Ray Forster. The lectotype is stored in Oxford University Museum of Natural History.

== Description ==
The female is recorded at 7.5mm in length. The carapace is orange brown. The legs are yellow brown. The abdomen is purplish grey with light markings dorsally. The male is recorded at 7.7mm in length. The carapace and legs are light orange brown. The abdomen is similar to that of the female.

== Biology ==
J.B. Gatenby published an account of his observations of this species in 1912. Unlike many other members of the genus that build their webs on trees, this species lives on mossy or clay banks. If insect prey approaches the retreat entrance, the spider will slightly open the trapdoor and rush out and grab it when it is within reach. It withdraws into the retreat to consume the prey. Females lay 30-60 eggs in late summer within a few weeks. They require humid conditions to thrive and are vulnerable to heat and dryness.

== Distribution ==
This species is only known from Dunedin, New Zealand.

== Conservation status ==
Under the New Zealand Threat Classification System, this species is listed as "Not Threatened".
