= Auhunga =

Conservation status
- Not Threatened (NZ TCS)

Scientific classification
- Domain: Eukaryota
- Kingdom: Animalia
- Phylum: Arthropoda
- Subphylum: Chelicerata
- Class: Arachnida
- Order: Araneae
- Infraorder: Araneomorphae
- Family: Amaurobiidae
- Genus: Auhunga
- Species: A. pectinata

Binomial name
- Auhunga pectinata Forster & Wilton, 1973

Genus of spiders

Auhunga is a genus of tangled nest spiders containing the single species, Auhunga pectinata. It is endemic to New Zealand.

== Taxonomy ==
This species was described in 1973 by Ray Forster and Cecil Wilton from male and female specimens. The holotype is stored in Canterbury Museum.

== Description ==
The female is recorded at 2.76mm in length whereas the male is 2.22mm. The cephalothorax and legs are pale yellow brown. The abdomen is creamy.

== Distribution ==
This species is only known from Canterbury, New Zealand.

== Conservation status ==
Under the New Zealand Threat Classification System, this species is listed as "Not Threatened".
