= Migas paradoxus =

Conservation status
- Data Deficient (NZ TCS)

Scientific classification
- Kingdom: Animalia
- Phylum: Arthropoda
- Subphylum: Chelicerata
- Class: Arachnida
- Order: Araneae
- Infraorder: Mygalomorphae
- Family: Migidae
- Genus: Migas
- Species: M. paradoxus

Binomial name
- Migas paradoxus Koch, 1873

Species of spider

Migas paradoxus is a species of mygalomorph spider endemic to New Zealand.

== Taxonomy ==
This species was described in 1873 by Ludwig Carl Christian Koch from a single female specimen collected in Auckland. This species is the type for the Migas genus. This species was most recently revised by Cecil Wilton in 1968. The location of the holotype is unknown, but presumed to still exist.

== Description ==
The female is recorded at 12mm in length. The carapace is orange brown. The legs are yellow brown. The abdomen is dark grey.

== Distribution ==
This species is recorded from the Auckland region and Cuvier Island in New Zealand.

== Conservation status ==
Under the New Zealand Threat Classification System, this species is listed as "Data Deficient" with the qualifiers of "Data Poor: Size" and "Data Poor: Trend".
