= Migas solitarius =

Conservation status
- Data Deficit (NZ TCS)

Scientific classification
- Kingdom: Animalia
- Phylum: Arthropoda
- Subphylum: Chelicerata
- Class: Arachnida
- Order: Araneae
- Infraorder: Mygalomorphae
- Family: Migidae
- Genus: Migas
- Species: M. solitarius

Binomial name
- Migas solitarius Wilton, 1968

Species of spider

Migas solitarius is a species of Mygalomorph spider endemic to New Zealand.

== Taxonomy ==
This species was described in 1968 by Cecil Wilton from a single female specimen collected in Taranaki. The holotype is stored in the New Zealand Arthropod Collection under registration number NZAC03014988.

== Description ==
The female is recorded at 11.8 mm (0.46 in) in length. The carapace and legs are orange brown, but paler in the latter. The abdomen is purpilish grey.

== Distribution ==
This species is only known from Tongapōrutu in Taranaki, New Zealand.

== Conservation status ==
Under the New Zealand Threat Classification System, this species is listed as "Data Deficient" with the qualifiers of "Data Poor: Size", "Data Poor: Trend" and "One Location".
