= Waitetola =

Conservation status
- Not Threatened (NZ TCS)

Scientific classification
- Kingdom: Animalia
- Phylum: Arthropoda
- Subphylum: Chelicerata
- Class: Arachnida
- Order: Araneae
- Infraorder: Araneomorphae
- Family: Amaurobiidae
- Genus: Waitetola
- Species: W. huttoni

Binomial name
- Waitetola huttoni Forster & Wilton, 1973

Genus of spiders

Waitetola is a genus of tangled nest spiders containing the single species, Waitetola huttoni. It is endemic to New Zealand.

== Taxonomy ==
This species was described in 1973 by Ray Forster and Cecil Wilton from male and female specimens. The holotype is stored in Otago Museum.

== Description ==
The female is recorded at 4.70mm in length whereas the male is 3.35mm. The carapace is coloured yellow brown with black markings. The legs are banded with black. The abdomen is shaded uniform black.

== Distribution ==
This species is only known from Hawkes Bay, New Zealand.

== Conservation status ==
Under the New Zealand Threat Classification System, this species is listed as "Not Threatened".
