= Migas cambridgei =

Conservation status
- Data Deficit (NZ TCS)

Scientific classification
- Kingdom: Animalia
- Phylum: Arthropoda
- Subphylum: Chelicerata
- Class: Arachnida
- Order: Araneae
- Infraorder: Mygalomorphae
- Family: Migidae
- Genus: Migas
- Species: M. cambridgei

Binomial name
- Migas cambridgei Wilton, 1968

Species of spider

Migas cambridgei is a species of mygalomorph spider endemic to New Zealand.

== Taxonomy ==
This species was described in 1968 by Cecil Wilton from a single female specimen collected in Christchurch. The holotype is stored at Otago Museum.

== Description ==
The female is recorded at 12mm in length. The carapace is dark orange brown. The legs are somewhat paler and tinged green. The abdomen is brown grey but purplish grey dorsally.

== Distribution ==
This species is only known from Lyttelton in Christchurch, New Zealand.

== Conservation status ==
Under the New Zealand Threat Classification System, this species is listed as "Data Deficient" with the qualifiers of "Data Poor: Size", "Data Poor: Trend" and "One Location".
