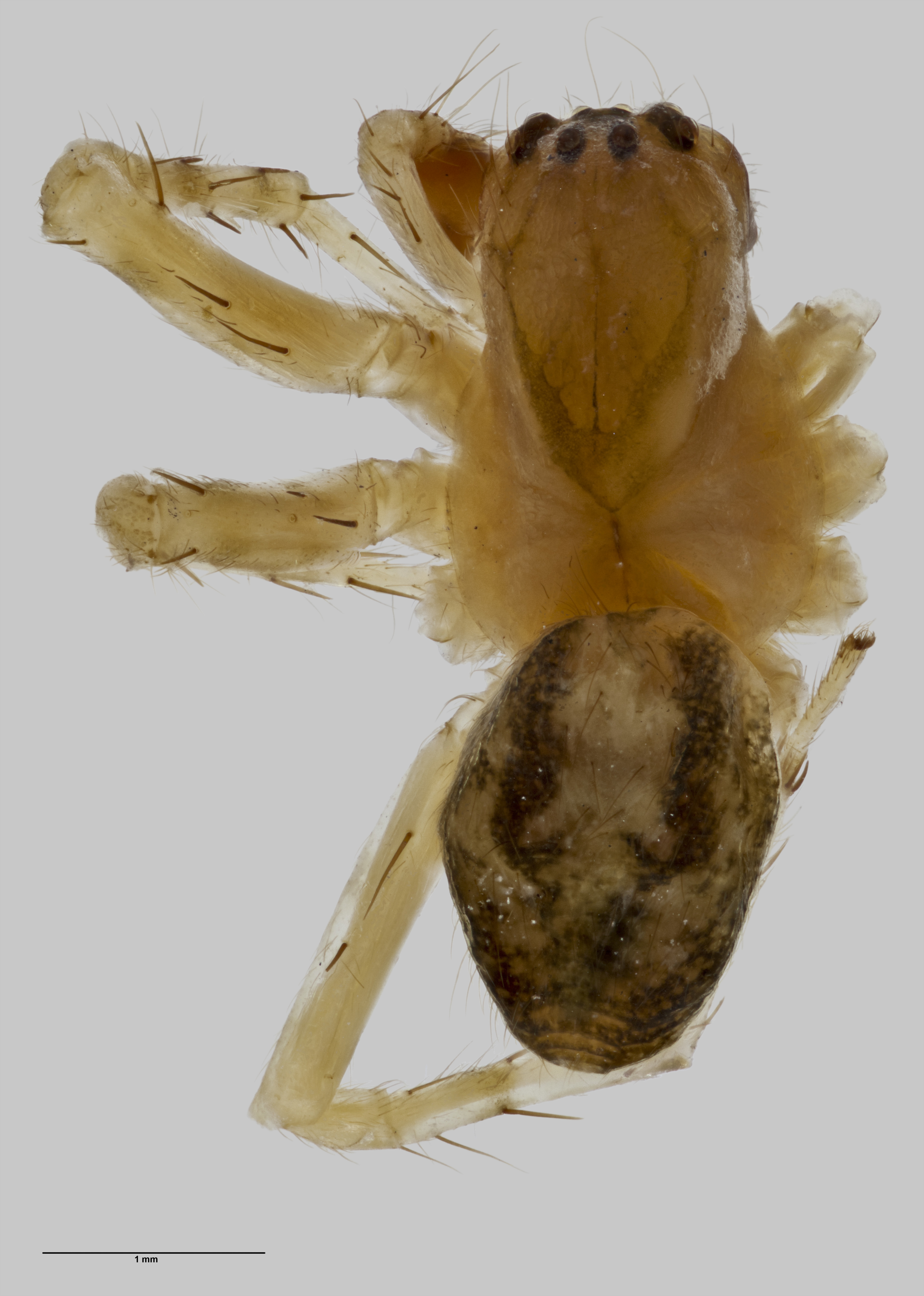
- Oramiella wisei

Conservation status
- Data Deficit (NZ TCS)

Scientific classification
- Kingdom: Animalia
- Phylum: Arthropoda
- Subphylum: Chelicerata
- Class: Arachnida
- Order: Araneae
- Infraorder: Araneomorphae
- Family: Agelenidae
- Genus: Oramiella
- Species: O. wisei

Binomial name
- Oramiella wisei Forster & Wilton, 1973

= Oramiella =

Genus of spiders

Oramiella is a genus of South Pacific funnel weavers containing the single species, Oramiella wisei.

== Taxonomy ==
This species was described by Raymond Robert Forster and Cecil Wilton in 1973 from a male specimen. The holotype is stored in Auckland War Memorial Museum under registration number AMNZ5063.

== Description ==
The male is recorded at 4.4mm in length. The cephalothorax is yellowish brown with dark markings dorsally. The legs are pale with some dark bands. The abdomen has a variety of complex dark markings.

== Distribution ==
This species is only known from Northland, New Zealand.

== Conservation status ==
Under the New Zealand Threat Classification System, this species is listed as "Data Deficient" with the qualifiers of "Data Poor: Size", "Data Poor: Trend" and "One Location".
