= Migas toddae =

Conservation status
- Data Deficit (NZ TCS)

Scientific classification
- Kingdom: Animalia
- Phylum: Arthropoda
- Subphylum: Chelicerata
- Class: Arachnida
- Order: Araneae
- Infraorder: Mygalomorphae
- Family: Migidae
- Genus: Migas
- Species: M. toddae

Binomial name
- Migas toddae Wilton, 1968

Synonyms
- Migas toddi

Species of spider

Migas toddae is a species of mygalomorph spider endemic to New Zealand.

== Taxonomy ==
This species was described as "Migas toddi" in 1968 by Cecil Wilton from female specimens collected in Otago. The species name was changed to "toddae" in 1983. The holotype is stored in Otago Museum.

== Description ==
The female is recorded at 10.1mm in length. The carapace is orange brown. The legs are yellow brown. The abdomen is pale brown grey but more purplish dorsally.

== Distribution ==
This species is only known from Trotters Gorge in Otago, New Zealand.

== Conservation status ==
Under the New Zealand Threat Classification System, this species is listed as "Data Deficient" with the qualifiers of "Data Poor: Size", "Data Poor: Trend" and "One Location".
