= Migas minor =

Conservation status
- Data Deficit (NZ TCS)

Scientific classification
- Kingdom: Animalia
- Phylum: Arthropoda
- Subphylum: Chelicerata
- Class: Arachnida
- Order: Araneae
- Infraorder: Mygalomorphae
- Family: Migidae
- Genus: Migas
- Species: M. minor

Binomial name
- Migas minor Wilton, 1968
- Waitākere Ranges, known native range

Species of spider

Migas minor is a species of mygalomorph spider endemic to New Zealand.

== Taxonomy ==
This species was described in 1968 by Cecil Wilton from a single female specimen collected in Auckland. The holotype is stored in Otago Museum.

== Description ==
The female is recorded at 7.6 mm (0.30 in) in length. The carapace is orange brown. The legs are olive coloured. The abdomen is purplish grey to grey brown.

== Distribution ==
This species is only known from the Waitākere Ranges in Auckland, New Zealand.

== Conservation status ==
Under the New Zealand Threat Classification System, this species is listed as "Data Deficient" with the qualifiers of "Data Poor: Size", "Data Poor: Trend" and "One Location".
