= Rangitata peelensis =

Conservation status
- Data Deficit (NZ TCS)

Scientific classification
- Kingdom: Animalia
- Phylum: Arthropoda
- Subphylum: Chelicerata
- Class: Arachnida
- Order: Araneae
- Infraorder: Araneomorphae
- Family: Desidae
- Genus: Rangitata
- Species: R. peelensis

Binomial name
- Rangitata peelensis Forster & Wilton, 1973

Genus of spiders

Rangitata is a genus of intertidal spiders containing the single species, Rangitata peelensis. It was first described by Raymond Robert Forster & Cecil. L. Wilton in 1973, and has only been found in New Zealand.

== Taxonomy ==
This genus was described in 1973 by Ray Forster and Cecil Wilton from a female specimen. The holotype is stored in Otago Museum.

== Description ==
The female is recorded at 4.5mm in length.

== Distribution ==
This species is only known from Canterbury, New Zealand.

== Conservation status ==
Under the New Zealand Threat Classification System, this species is listed as "Data Deficient" with the qualifiers of "Data Poor: Size", "Data Poor: Trend" and "One Location".
