= Migas plomleyi =

Scientific classification
- Kingdom: Animalia
- Phylum: Arthropoda
- Subphylum: Chelicerata
- Class: Arachnida
- Order: Araneae
- Infraorder: Mygalomorphae
- Family: Migidae
- Genus: Migas
- Species: M. plomleyi

Binomial name
- Migas plomleyi Raven & Churchill, 1989

Species of spider

Migas plomleyi, also known as Plomley's trapdoor spider, is a species of tree trapdoor spider in the Migidae family. It is endemic to Australia. It was described in 1989 by Australian arachnologists Robert Raven and Tracey Churchill.

== Distribution and habitat ==
The species occurs in Tasmania. It is only known from the Cataract Gorge–Trevallyn area, in the suburbs of Launceston in the north of the state. It prefers sheltered, humid sites where the ground is covered with a lush growth of lichens or mosses. Only female specimens are known; it has rarely been collected, and is listed as Endangered under Tasmania's Threatened Species Protection Act 1995.

== Behaviour ==
The spiders construct individual parchment-like silk chambers about 2 cm across, on the ground or on moss-covered rocks, the entrances to which are closed by thin trapdoors or lids.
