= Maloides =

Conservation status
- Nationally Critical (NZ TCS)

Scientific classification
- Kingdom: Animalia
- Phylum: Arthropoda
- Subphylum: Chelicerata
- Class: Arachnida
- Order: Araneae
- Infraorder: Araneomorphae
- Family: Amaurobiidae
- Genus: Maloides
- Species: M. cavernicola

Binomial name
- Maloides cavernicola (Forster & Wilton, 1989)

Synonyms
- Mala cavernicola

Genus of spiders

Maloides is a genus of cave-dwelling spiders containing only one species, Maloides cavernicola, currently placed in the family Amaurobiidae.

== Taxonomy ==
This species was first described as Mala cavernicola by Ray Forster and Cecil Wilton in 1973 from a female specimen. The male of this species is unknown. The genus was renamed as Maloides in 1989. The holotype is stored in the New Zealand Arthropod Collection.

== Description ==
The female is recorded at 10.74mm in length. The carapace and legs are coloured pale yellow. The abdomen is creamy. The eyes are very reduced.

== Distribution and habitat ==
This species is only known from Nelson, New Zealand. It is only known to occur in caves.

== Conservation status ==
Under the New Zealand Threat Classification System, this species is listed as "Nationally Critical" with the qualifiers of "Data Poor: Size", "Data Poor: Trend" and "One Location".
