= Holomamoea =

Conservation status
- Not Threatened (NZ TCS)

Scientific classification
- Kingdom: Animalia
- Phylum: Arthropoda
- Subphylum: Chelicerata
- Class: Arachnida
- Order: Araneae
- Infraorder: Araneomorphae
- Family: Desidae
- Genus: Holomamoea
- Species: H. foveata

Binomial name
- Holomamoea foveata Forster & Wilton, 1973

Genus of spiders

Holomamoea is a genus of South Pacific intertidal spiders containing the single species, Holomamoea foveata.

== Taxonomy ==
This monotypic genus was described by Ray Forster and Cecil Wilton in 1973 from male and female specimens. The holotype is stored in Otago Museum.

== Description ==
The male is recorded at 5.20 mm in length whereas the female is 5.40 mm. The male carapace is coloured reddish brown. The legs are pale yellow brown. The abdomen is shaded blackish brown. The female differs in having a chevron pattern dorsally.

== Distribution ==
This species is only known from Westland, New Zealand.

== Conservation status ==
Under the New Zealand Threat Classification System, this species is listed as "Not Threatened".
