= Migas australis =

Conservation status
- Not Threatened (NZ TCS)

Scientific classification
- Kingdom: Animalia
- Phylum: Arthropoda
- Subphylum: Chelicerata
- Class: Arachnida
- Order: Araneae
- Infraorder: Mygalomorphae
- Family: Migidae
- Genus: Migas
- Species: M. australis

Binomial name
- Migas australis Wilton, 1968

Species of spider

Migas australis is a species of mygalomorph spider endemic to New Zealand.

== Taxonomy ==
This species was described in 1968 by Cecil Wilton from female and male specimens collected in Fiordland. The holotype is stored at Otago Museum.

== Description ==
The female is recorded at 11.8mm in length. The carapace and legs are orange brown. The abdomen brownish grey. The male is recorded at 8.3mm in length. The carapace is yellowish brown. The legs are greenish brown. The abdomen is dark grey.

== Distribution ==
This species is only known from Fiordland, New Zealand.

== Conservation status ==
Under the New Zealand Threat Classification System, this species is listed as "Not Threatened" with the qualifiers of "Data Poor: Size" and "Data Poor: Trend".
