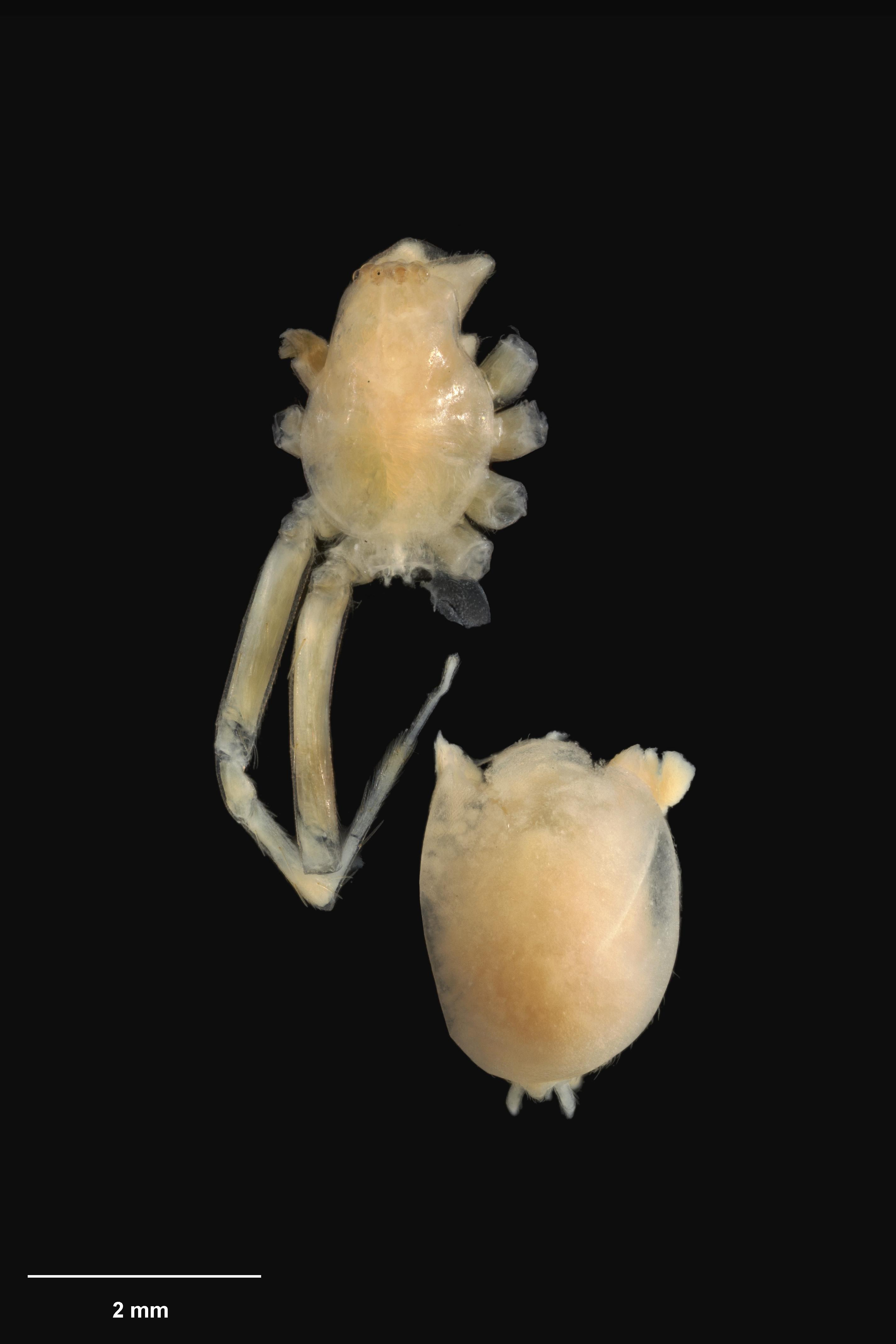

Conservation status
- Data Deficit (NZ TCS)

Scientific classification
- Kingdom: Animalia
- Phylum: Arthropoda
- Subphylum: Chelicerata
- Class: Arachnida
- Order: Araneae
- Infraorder: Araneomorphae
- Family: Desidae
- Genus: Waterea
- Species: W. cornigera

Binomial name
- Waterea cornigera Forster & Wilton, 1973

= Waterea =

Genus of spiders

Waterea is a genus of intertidal spiders endemic to New Zealand containing the single species, Waterea cornigera.

== Taxonomy ==
This species was described by Ray Forster and Cecil Wilton in 1973 from a female specimen. The holotype is stored in Te Papa Museum under registration number AS.000018.

== Description ==
The female is recorded at 5.3mm in length.

== Distribution ==
This species is only known from East Cape, New Zealand.

== Conservation status ==
Under the New Zealand Threat Classification System, this species is listed as "Data Deficient" with the qualifiers of "Data Poor: Size", "Data Poor: Trend" and "One Location".
