= Cecil Wilton =

- Born: 7 December 1906
- Died: 18 February 1995 (aged 88)
- Known for: New Zealand arachnofauna
- Scientific career
- Fields: zoology

Cecil Louis Wilton (7 December 1906 – 18 February 1995) (abbreviated Wilton) was a New Zealand arachnologist.

== Taxa named in his honour ==
- Hexathele wiltoni Forster, 1968
- Kapanga wiltoni Forster, 1970
- Notomatachia wiltoni Forster, 1970
- Otagoa wiltoni Forster, 1970
- Tuakana wiltoni Forster, 1970
- Erigone wiltoni Locket, 1973
- Waiporia wiltoni Forster & Platnick, 1985
- Pahora wiltoni Forster, 1990
- Wiltona Koçak & Kemal, 2008

== Taxa described ==
- Ahua Forster & Wilton, 1973
- Akatorea Forster & Wilton, 1973
- Amphinectidae Forster & Wilton, 1973
- Aorangia Forster & Wilton, 1973
- Auhunga Forster & Wilton, 1973
- Auhunga pectinata Forster & Wilton, 1973
- Dunstanoides Forster & Wilton in Platnick, 1989
- Holomamoea Forster & Wilton, 1973
- Holomamoea foveata Forster & Wilton, 1973
- Huka Forster & Wilton, 1973
- Hulua Forster & Wilton, 1973
- Mahura Forster & Wilton, 1973
- Makora Forster & Wilton, 1973
- Maloides Forster & Wilton in Platnick, 1989
- Maloides cavernicola (Forster & Wilton, 1973)
- Mamoea Forster & Wilton, 1973
- Migas australis Wilton, 1968
- Migas borealis Wilton, 1968
- Migas cambridgei Wilton, 1968
- Migas cantuarius Wilton, 1968
- Migas centralis Wilton, 1968
- Migas cumberi Wilton, 1968
- Migas gatenbyi Wilton, 1968
- Migas giveni Wilton, 1968
- Migas goyeni Wilton, 1968
- Migas hesperus Wilton, 1968
- Migas hollowayi Wilton, 1968
- Migas insularis Wilton, 1968
- Migas kirki Wilton, 1968
- Migas kochi Wilton, 1968
- Migas linburnensis Wilton, 1968
- Migas lomasi Wilton, 1968
- Migas marplesi Wilton, 1968
- Migas minor Wilton, 1968
- Migas otari Wilton, 1968
- Migas quintus Wilton, 1968
- Migas sandageri Goyen, 1890
- Migas saxatilis Wilton, 1968
- Migas secundus Wilton, 1968
- Migas solitarius Wilton, 1968
- Migas tasmani Wilton, 1968
- Migas toddae Wilton, 1968
- Migas tuhoe Wilton, 1968
- Muritaia Forster & Wilton, 1973
- Nanocambridgea Forster & Wilton, 1973
- Neolana Forster & Wilton, 1973
- Neomyro Forster & Wilton, 1973
- Neoramia Forster & Wilton, 1973
- Neorepukia Forster & Wilton, 1973
- Neororea Forster & Wilton, 1973
- Nuisiana Forster & Wilton, 1973
- Oparara (genus) Forster & Wilton, 1973
- Oparara karamea Forster & Wilton, 1973
- Oramiella Forster & Wilton, 1973
- Oramiella wisei Forster & Wilton, 1973
- Orepukia Forster & Wilton, 1973
- Otira Forster & Wilton, 1973
- Pakeha Forster & Wilton, 1973
- Paramamoea Forster & Wilton, 1973
- Paramyro Forster & Wilton, 1973
- Paravoca Forster & Wilton, 1973
- Poaka Forster & Wilton, 1973
- Poaka graminicola Forster & Wilton, 1973
- Porotaka Forster & Wilton, 1973
- Procambridgea Forster & Wilton, 1973
- Rangitata Forster & Wilton, 1973
- Rangitata peelensis Forster & Wilton, 1973
- Reinga Forster & Wilton, 1973
- Rorea Forster & Wilton, 1973
- Rorea aucklandensis Forster & Wilton, 1973
- Tararua Forster & Wilton, 1973
- Toxopsoides Forster & Wilton, 1973
- Toxopsoides huttoni Forster & Wilton, 1973
- Tuapoka Forster & Wilton, 1973
- Waitetola Forster & Wilton, 1973
- Waitetola huttoni Forster & Wilton, 1973
- Waterea Forster & Wilton, 1973
- Waterea cornigera Forster & Wilton, 1973
- Wiltona filicicola (Forster & Wilton, 1973)
- Zealoctenus Forster & Wilton, 1973
- Zealoctenus cardronaensis Forster & Wilton, 1973
- Zearchaea Wilton, 1946
- Zearchaea clypeata Wilton, 1946

== Selected publications ==
- Wilton, 1946: A new spider of the family Archaeidae from New Zealand. Dominion Museum Records in Entomology 1: 19–26
- Wilton, 1968: The spiders of New Zealand. Part II. Migidae. Otago Museum Bulletin 2: 73–126
- Forster & Wilton, 1973: The spiders of New Zealand. Part IV. Otago Museum Bulletin 4: 1–309
