= Migas nitens =

Scientific classification
- Kingdom: Animalia
- Phylum: Arthropoda
- Subphylum: Chelicerata
- Class: Arachnida
- Order: Araneae
- Infraorder: Mygalomorphae
- Family: Migidae
- Genus: Migas
- Species: M. nitens

Binomial name
- Migas nitens Hickman, 1927

Species of spider

Migas nitens is a species of tree trapdoor spider in the Migidae family. It is endemic to Australia. It was described in 1927 by Australian arachnologist Vernon Victor Hickman.

== Distribution and habitat ==
The species occurs in Tasmania. The type locality is Cornelian Bay, Hobart.
