= Migas giveni =

Conservation status
- Data Deficit (NZ TCS)

Scientific classification
- Kingdom: Animalia
- Phylum: Arthropoda
- Subphylum: Chelicerata
- Class: Arachnida
- Order: Araneae
- Infraorder: Mygalomorphae
- Family: Migidae
- Genus: Migas
- Species: M. giveni

Binomial name
- Migas giveni Wilton, 1968

Species of spider

Migas giveni is a species of mygalomorph spider endemic to New Zealand.

== Taxonomy ==
This species was described in 1968 by Cecil Wilton from female specimens collected in Northland and on Cuvier Island. The holotype is stored at the New Zealand Arthropod Collection under registration number NZAC03014987.

== Description ==
The female is recorded at 10.4mm in length. The carapace and legs are orange brown. The abdomen is brownish grey.

== Distribution ==
This species is only known from Whangārei and Cuvier Island.

== Conservation status ==
Under the New Zealand Threat Classification System, this species is listed as "Data Deficient" with the qualifiers of "Data Poor: Size" and "Data Poor: Trend".
