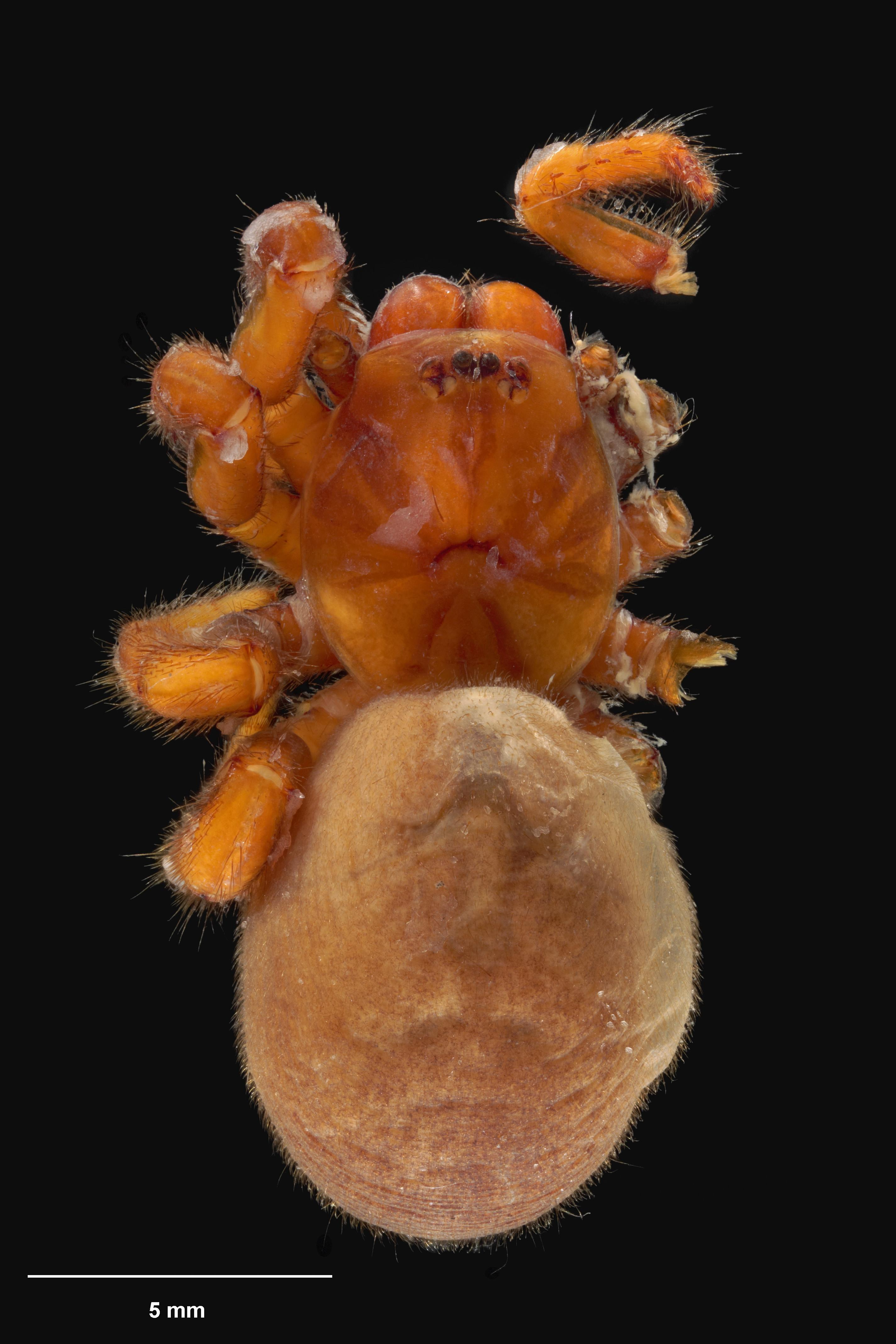

Conservation status
- Data Deficit (NZ TCS)

Scientific classification
- Kingdom: Animalia
- Phylum: Arthropoda
- Subphylum: Chelicerata
- Class: Arachnida
- Order: Araneae
- Infraorder: Mygalomorphae
- Family: Migidae
- Genus: Migas
- Species: M. lomasi

Binomial name
- Migas lomasi Wilton, 1968

= Migas lomasi =

Species of spider

Migas lomasi is a species of mygalomorph spider in the family Migidae (tree trapdoor spiders), endemic to New Zealand, where it has been recorded only from a single locality in the Otago Region of the South Island.

== Taxonomy ==
Migas lomasi was described in 1968 by the New Zealand arachnologist Cecil Wilton, in the second part of The Spiders of New Zealand—a monograph co-authored with Ray Forster that revised the New Zealand mygalomorph families Ctenizidae, Dipluridae and Migidae. The description was based on a single female holotype collected at Makarora. The specimen is held in the Museum of New Zealand Te Papa Tongarewa under registration number AS.000059.

== Description ==
The female has a total body length of 16 mm. The carapace and legs are orange brown, and the abdomen is pale purplish brown.

== Distribution ==
Migas lomasi has only been recorded from Makarora, a small settlement near the head of Lake Wānaka in the Otago Region of the South Island.

== Conservation status ==
Under the New Zealand Threat Classification System, M. lomasi is listed as "Data Deficient", with the qualifiers "Data Poor: Size", "Data Poor: Trend" and "One Location".
