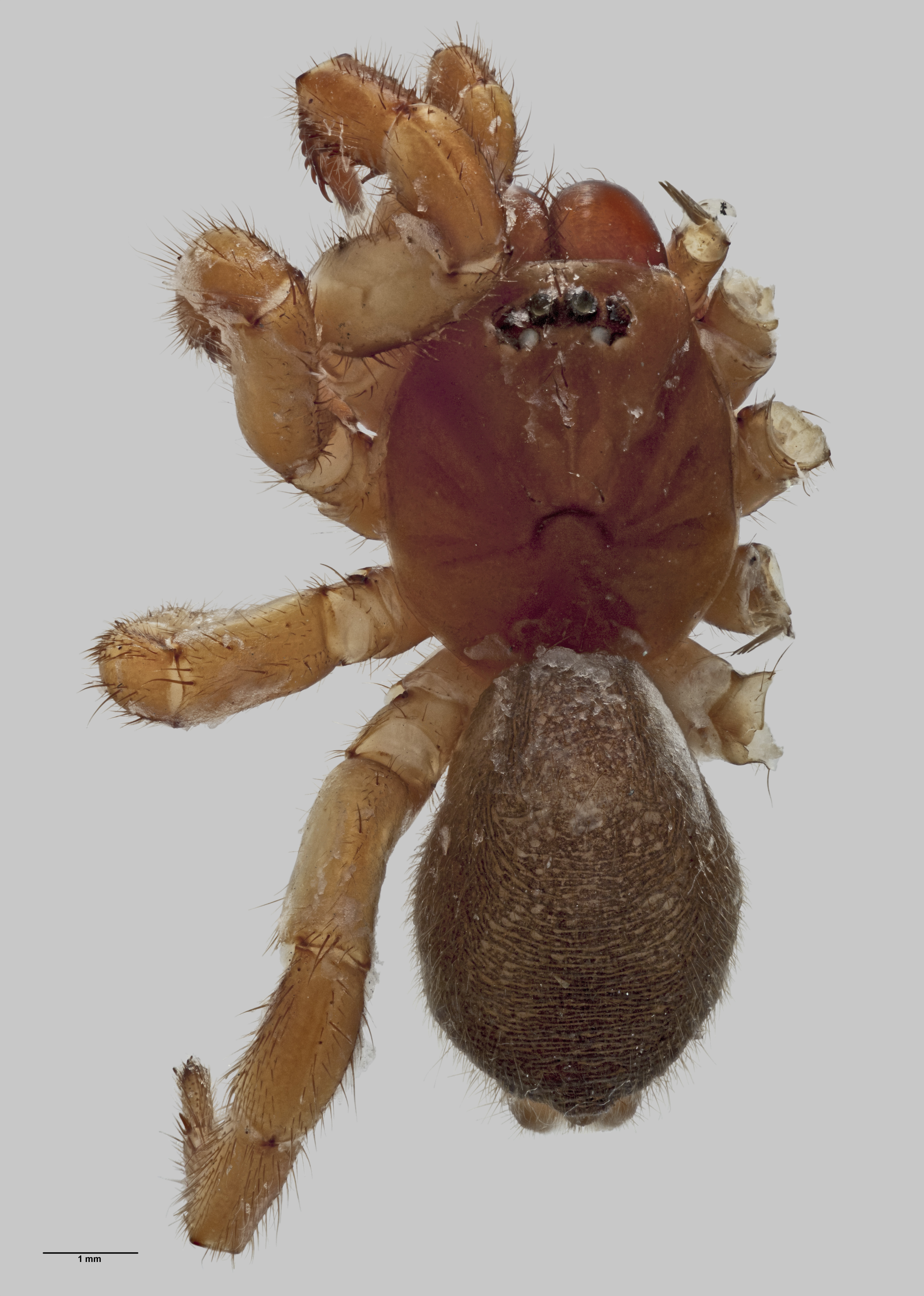

Conservation status
- Naturally Uncommon (NZ TCS)

Scientific classification
- Kingdom: Animalia
- Phylum: Arthropoda
- Subphylum: Chelicerata
- Class: Arachnida
- Order: Araneae
- Infraorder: Mygalomorphae
- Family: Migidae
- Genus: Migas
- Species: M. insularis

Binomial name
- Migas insularis Wilton, 1968
- Distribution (in green) of Migas insularis

= Migas insularis =

Species of spider

Migas insularis is a species of Mygalomorph spider endemic to New Zealand.

== Taxonomy ==
This species was described in 1968 by Cecil Wilton from a single female specimen collected on Little Barrier Island by Graham Turbott in 1945. The holotype is stored in Auckland Museum under registration number AMNZ5060.

== Description ==
The female is recorded at 9.3mm in length, The abdomen and carapace are bright orange brown (paler in the latter). The abdomen is brownish grey.

== Distribution ==
This species is only known from Little Barrier Island, New Zealand.

== Conservation status ==
Under the New Zealand Threat Classification System, this species is listed as "Data Deficient" with the qualifiers of "Island Endemic" and "One Location".
