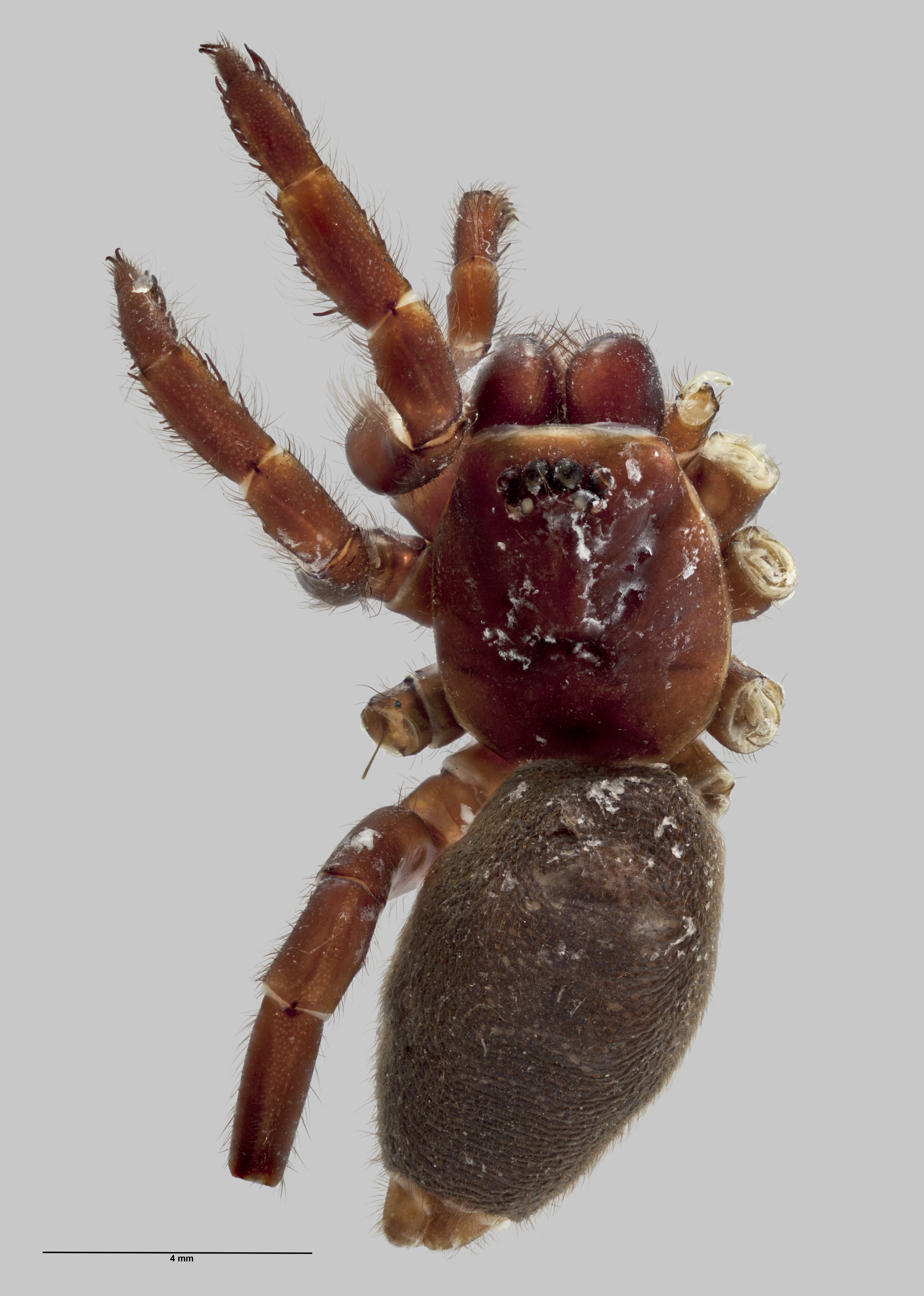

Conservation status
- Naturally Uncommon (NZ TCS)

Scientific classification
- Kingdom: Animalia
- Phylum: Arthropoda
- Subphylum: Chelicerata
- Class: Arachnida
- Order: Araneae
- Infraorder: Mygalomorphae
- Family: Migidae
- Genus: Migas
- Species: M. borealis

Binomial name
- Migas borealis Wilton, 1968

= Migas borealis =

Species of spider

Migas borealis is a species of mygalomorph spider endemic to New Zealand.

== Taxonomy ==
This species was described in 1968 by Cecil Wilton from female specimens collected in Three King Islands. The holotype is stored in Auckland Museum.

== Description ==
The female is recorded at 12.1mm in length. The carapace and legs are chestnut brown. The abdomen is purplish grey.

== Distribution ==
This species is only known from Great Island in the Three King Islands, New Zealand.

== Conservation status ==
Under the New Zealand Threat Classification System, this species is listed as "Naturally Uncommon" with the qualifiers of "Island Endemic" and "One Location".
