= Migas quintus =

Conservation status
- Data Deficit (NZ TCS)

Scientific classification
- Kingdom: Animalia
- Phylum: Arthropoda
- Subphylum: Chelicerata
- Class: Arachnida
- Order: Araneae
- Infraorder: Mygalomorphae
- Family: Migidae
- Genus: Migas
- Species: M. quintus

Binomial name
- Migas quintus Wilton, 1968

Species of spider

Migas quintus is a species of mygalomorph spider endemic to New Zealand.

== Taxonomy ==
This species was described in 1968 by Cecil Wilton from a single female specimen collected in Dannevirke. The holotype is stored in Otago Museum.

== Description ==
The female is recorded at 10.6mm in length. The carapace and legs are yellowish brown. The abdomen is purplish grey, darker dorsally.

== Distribution ==
This species is only known from Dannevirke, New Zealand.

== Conservation status ==
Under the New Zealand Threat Classification System, this species is listed as "Data Deficient" with the qualifiers of "Data Poor: Size", "Data Poor: Trend" and "One Location".
