= Migas saxatilis =

Conservation status
- Naturally Uncommon (NZ TCS)

Scientific classification
- Kingdom: Animalia
- Phylum: Arthropoda
- Subphylum: Chelicerata
- Class: Arachnida
- Order: Araneae
- Infraorder: Mygalomorphae
- Family: Migidae
- Genus: Migas
- Species: M. saxatilis

Binomial name
- Migas saxatilis Wilton, 1968

Species of spider

Migas saxatilis is a species of mygalomorph spider endemic to New Zealand.

== Taxonomy ==
This species was described in 1968 by Cecil Wilton from female and male specimens collected in Banks Peninsula. The location of the holotype was not explicitly stated.

== Description ==
The female is recorded at 11mm in length. The carapace and legs are dark, tinged with green but lighter in the latter. The abdomen is purplish brown dorsally with a pattern. In contrast, the male is recorded at 6.4mm in length. The carapace is pale orange whilst the legs are greenish brown. The abdomen is brown with a pattern dorsally.

== Distribution ==
This species is only known from Banks Peninsula, New Zealand.

== Conservation status ==
Under the New Zealand Threat Classification System, this species is listed as "Naturally Uncommon" with the qualifiers of "Range Restricted".
