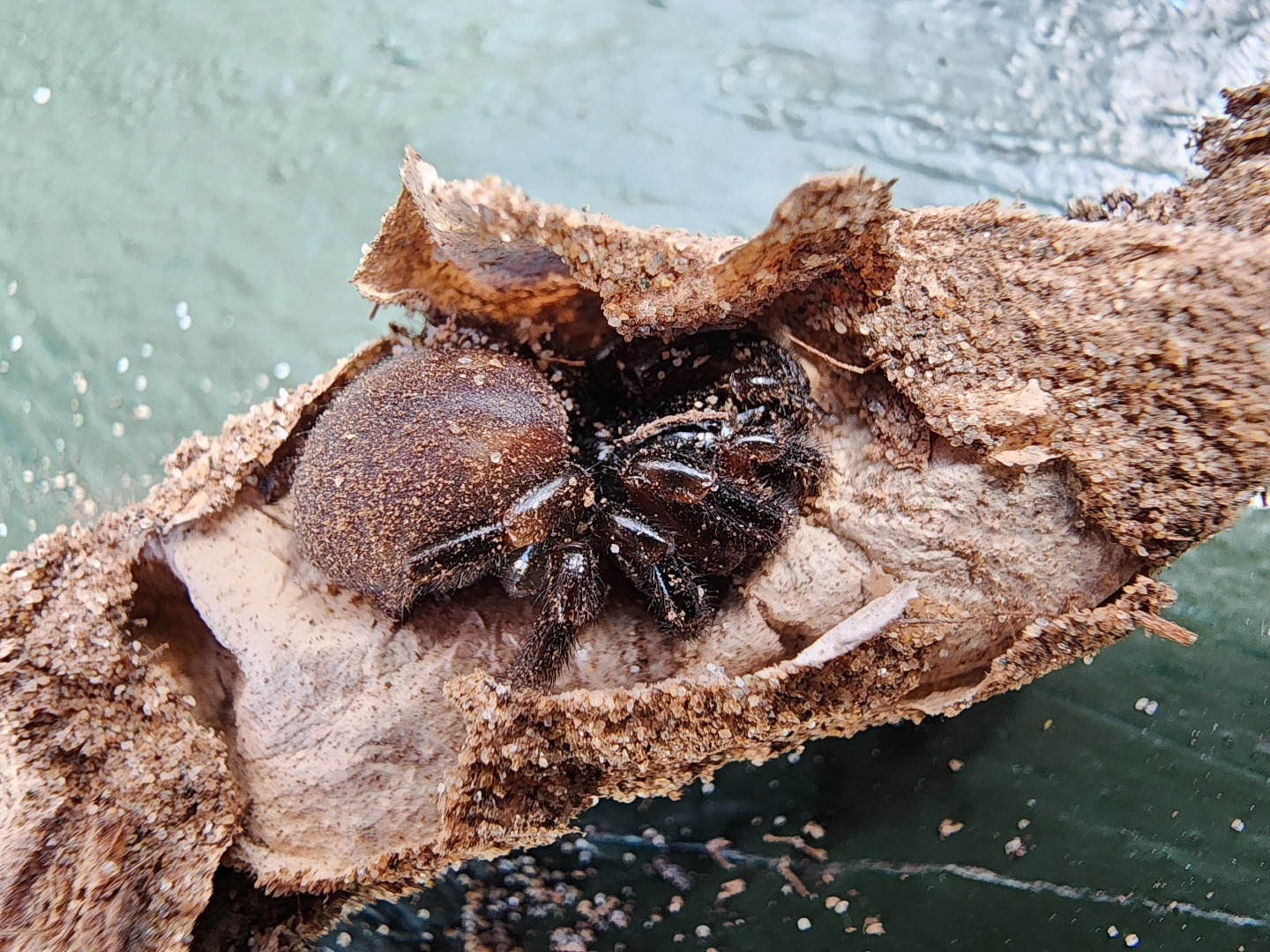

Conservation status
- Data Deficit (NZ TCS)

Scientific classification
- Kingdom: Animalia
- Phylum: Arthropoda
- Subphylum: Chelicerata
- Class: Arachnida
- Order: Araneae
- Infraorder: Mygalomorphae
- Family: Migidae
- Genus: Migas
- Species: M. marplesi

Binomial name
- Migas marplesi Wilton, 1968

= Migas marplesi =

Species of spider

Migas marplesi is a species of mygalomorph spider endemic to New Zealand.

== Taxonomy ==
This species was described in 1968 by Cecil Wilton from female and male specimens collected in Otago. This species is only known from Otago Museum.

== Description ==
The female is recorded at 13.2mm in length. The carapace and legs are olive grey. The abdomen is grey brown with transverse bands dorsally. The male is recorded at 8.2mm in length. The carapace and legs are yellow brown. The abdomen is purplish grey dorsally.

== Distribution ==
This species is only known from Otago, New Zealand.

== Conservation status ==
Under the New Zealand Threat Classification System, this species is listed as "Data Deficient" with the qualifiers of "Data Poor: Size" and "Data Poor: Trend".
