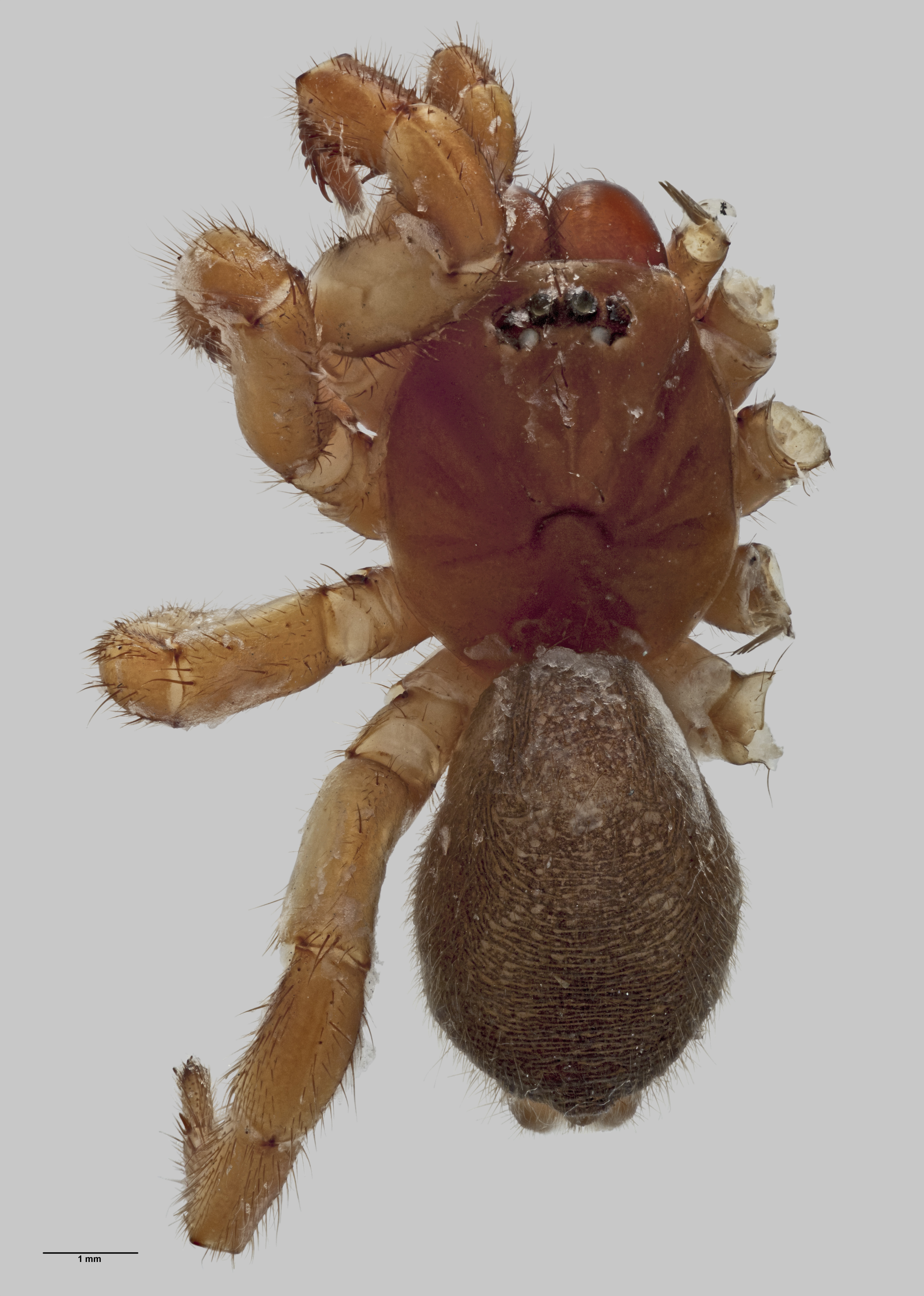
- Female holotype specimen of Migas insularis

Scientific classification
- Kingdom: Animalia
- Phylum: Arthropoda
- Subphylum: Chelicerata
- Class: Arachnida
- Order: Araneae
- Infraorder: Mygalomorphae
- Family: Migidae
- Genus: Migas; L. Koch, 1873

Diversity
- 34 species

= Migas (spider) =

Genus of spiders

Migas is a genus of spiders in the family Migidae. Most species are found only in New Zealand, with three found in Australia and one species, Migas affinis, in New Caledonia.

== Taxonomy ==
The genus Migas was erected by Ludwig Koch in 1873, for the species Migas paradoxus. Of the 34 species accepted as of October 2017, 26 were described by C. L. Wilton in 1968, all from New Zealand. Many of the species are very similar in external appearance, being distinguished by the internal structure of the female genitalia.

=== Species ===
As of October 2017, the World Spider Catalog accepted the following extant species:

- Migas affinis Berland, 1924 – New Caledonia
- Migas australis Wilton, 1968 – New Zealand
- Migas borealis Wilton, 1968 – New Zealand
- Migas cambridgei Wilton, 1968 – New Zealand
- Migas cantuarius Wilton, 1968 – New Zealand
- Migas centralis Wilton, 1968 – New Zealand
- Migas cumberi Wilton, 1968 – New Zealand
- Migas distinctus O. Pickard-Cambridge, 1880 – New Zealand
- Migas gatenbyi Wilton, 1968 – New Zealand
- Migas giveni Wilton, 1968 – New Zealand
- Migas goyeni Wilton, 1968 – New Zealand
- Migas hesperus Wilton, 1968 – New Zealand
- Migas hollowayi Wilton, 1968 – New Zealand
- Migas insularis Wilton, 1968 – New Zealand
- Migas kirki Wilton, 1968 – New Zealand
- Migas kochi Wilton, 1968 – New Zealand
- Migas linburnensis Wilton, 1968 – New Zealand
- Migas lomasi Wilton, 1968 – New Zealand
- Migas marplesi Wilton, 1968 – New Zealand
- Migas minor Wilton, 1968 – New Zealand
- Migas nitens Hickman, 1927 – Australia (Tasmania)
- Migas otari Wilton, 1968 – New Zealand
- Migas paradoxus L. Koch, 1873 (type species) – New Zealand
- Migas plomleyi Raven & Churchill, 1989 – Australia (Tasmania)
- Migas quintus Wilton, 1968 – New Zealand
- Migas sandageri Goyen, 1890 – New Zealand
- Migas saxatilis Wilton, 1968 – New Zealand
- Migas secundus Wilton, 1968 – New Zealand
- Migas solitarius Wilton, 1968 – New Zealand
- Migas taierii Todd, 1945 – New Zealand
- Migas tasmani Wilton, 1968 – New Zealand
- Migas toddae Wilton, 1968 – New Zealand
- Migas tuhoe Wilton, 1968 – New Zealand
- Migas variapalpus Raven, 1984 – Australia (Queensland)
