= Zealoctenus =

Scientific classification
- Kingdom: Animalia
- Phylum: Arthropoda
- Subphylum: Chelicerata
- Class: Arachnida
- Order: Araneae
- Infraorder: Araneomorphae
- Family: Miturgidae
- Genus: Zealoctenus
- Species: Z. cardronaensis

Binomial name
- Zealoctenus cardronaensis Forster & Wilton, 1973

Genus of spiders

Zealoctenus is a genus of spiders in the family Miturgidae. It was first described in 1973 by Forster & Wilton. As of 2017, it contains only one species, Zealoctenus cardronaensis, found in New Zealand.
