= Migas hesperus =

Conservation status
- Data Deficit (NZ TCS)

Scientific classification
- Kingdom: Animalia
- Phylum: Arthropoda
- Subphylum: Chelicerata
- Class: Arachnida
- Order: Araneae
- Infraorder: Mygalomorphae
- Family: Migidae
- Genus: Migas
- Species: M. hesperus

Binomial name
- Migas hesperus Wilton, 1968

Species of spider

Migas hesperus is a species of mygalomorph spider endemic to New Zealand.

== Taxonomy ==
This species was described in 1968 by Cecil Wilton from female specimens collected in Greymouth. The holotype is stored at Canterbury Museum.

== Description ==
The female is recorded at 12.8mm in length. The carapace and legs are orange brown. The abdomen is brownish grey.

== Distribution ==
This species is only known from Greymouth, New Zealand.

== Conservation status ==
Under the New Zealand Threat Classification System, this species is listed as "Data Deficient" with the qualifiers of "Data Poor: Size" and "Data Poor: Trend".
