= Micromesomma =

Scientific classification
- Domain: Eukaryota
- Kingdom: Animalia
- Phylum: Arthropoda
- Subphylum: Chelicerata
- Class: Arachnida
- Order: Araneae
- Infraorder: Mygalomorphae
- Family: Migidae
- Genus: Micromesomma
- Species: M. cowani

Binomial name
- Micromesomma cowani Pocock, 1895

Genus of spiders

Micromesomma is a genus of spiders in the family Migidae. It was first described in 1895 by Pocock. As of 2017, it contains only one species, Micromesomma cowani, found in Madagascar.
