= Migas sandageri =

Conservation status
- Naturally Uncommon (NZ TCS)

Scientific classification
- Kingdom: Animalia
- Phylum: Arthropoda
- Subphylum: Chelicerata
- Class: Arachnida
- Order: Araneae
- Infraorder: Mygalomorphae
- Family: Migidae
- Genus: Migas
- Species: M. sandageri

Binomial name
- Migas sandageri Goyen, 1891
- Native range

Species of spider

Migas sandageri is a species of mygalomorph spider endemic to New Zealand.

== Taxonomy ==
This species was described in 1891 by Peter Goyen from female specimens collected on Mokohinau Islands. It was most recently revised in 1968 by Cecil Wilton. The lectotype is stored in Otago Museum.

== Description ==
The female is recorded at roughly 9 mm (0.35 in) in length. The carapace is dark orange brown. The legs are yellow brown. The abdomen is dark brown.

== Distribution ==
This species is known from Mokohinau Islands, New Zealand. Migas sandageri has also been identified as being present on the Poor Knights Islands, however these specimens have differing tarsal claw teeth.

== Conservation status ==
Under the New Zealand Threat Classification System, this species is listed as "Naturally Uncommon" with the qualifiers of "Island Endemic" and "One Location".
