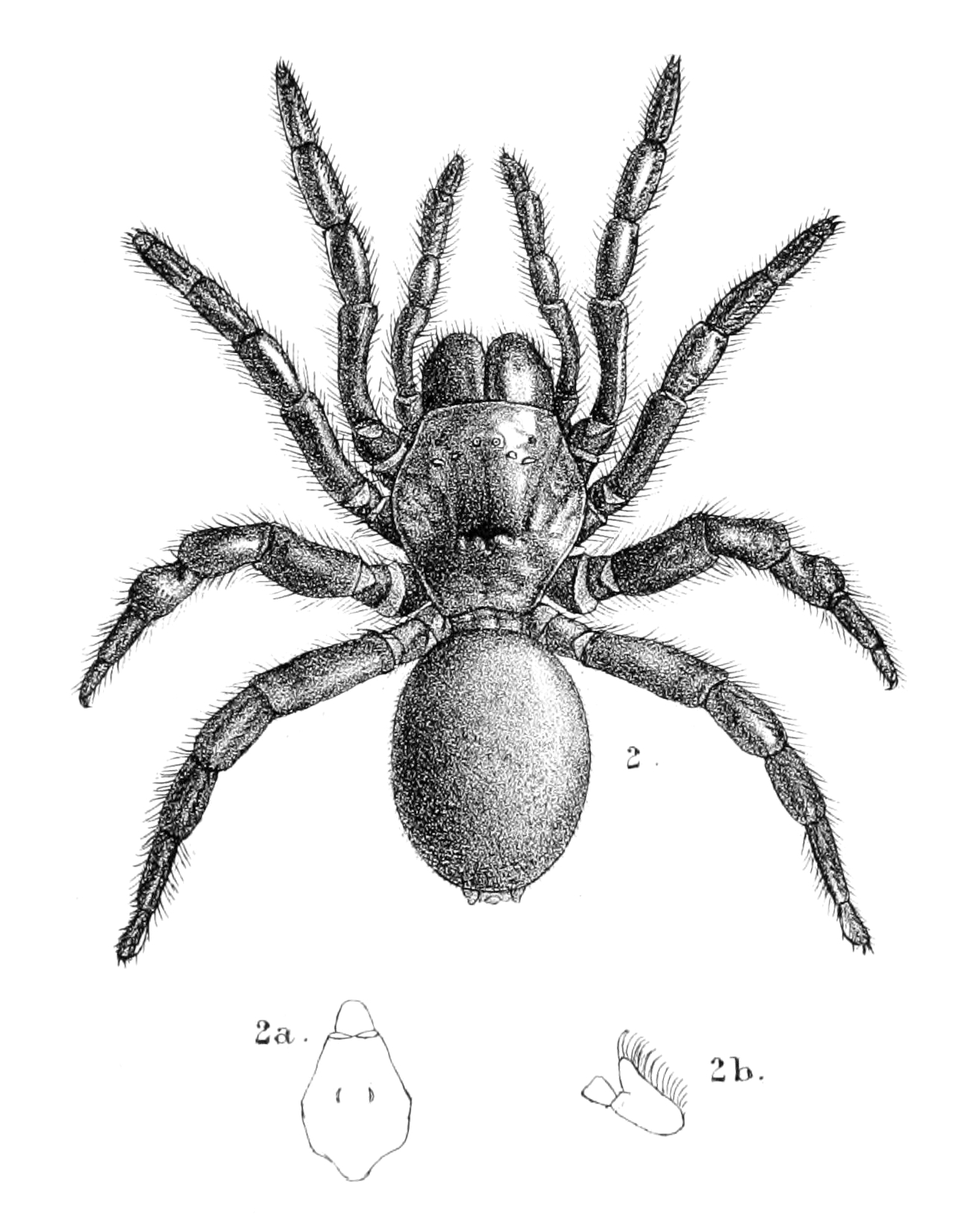
- T. mirandus

Scientific classification
- Domain: Eukaryota
- Kingdom: Animalia
- Phylum: Arthropoda
- Subphylum: Chelicerata
- Class: Arachnida
- Order: Araneae
- Infraorder: Mygalomorphae
- Family: Migidae
- Genus: Thyropoeus; Pocock

Species
- Thyropoeus malagasus (Strand, 1908); Thyropoeus mirandus Pocock, 1895

= Thyropoeus =

Genus of spiders

Thyropoeus is a genus of spiders in the family Migidae. It was first described in 1895 by Pocock. As of 2016, it contains 2 species, both found in Madagascar.
