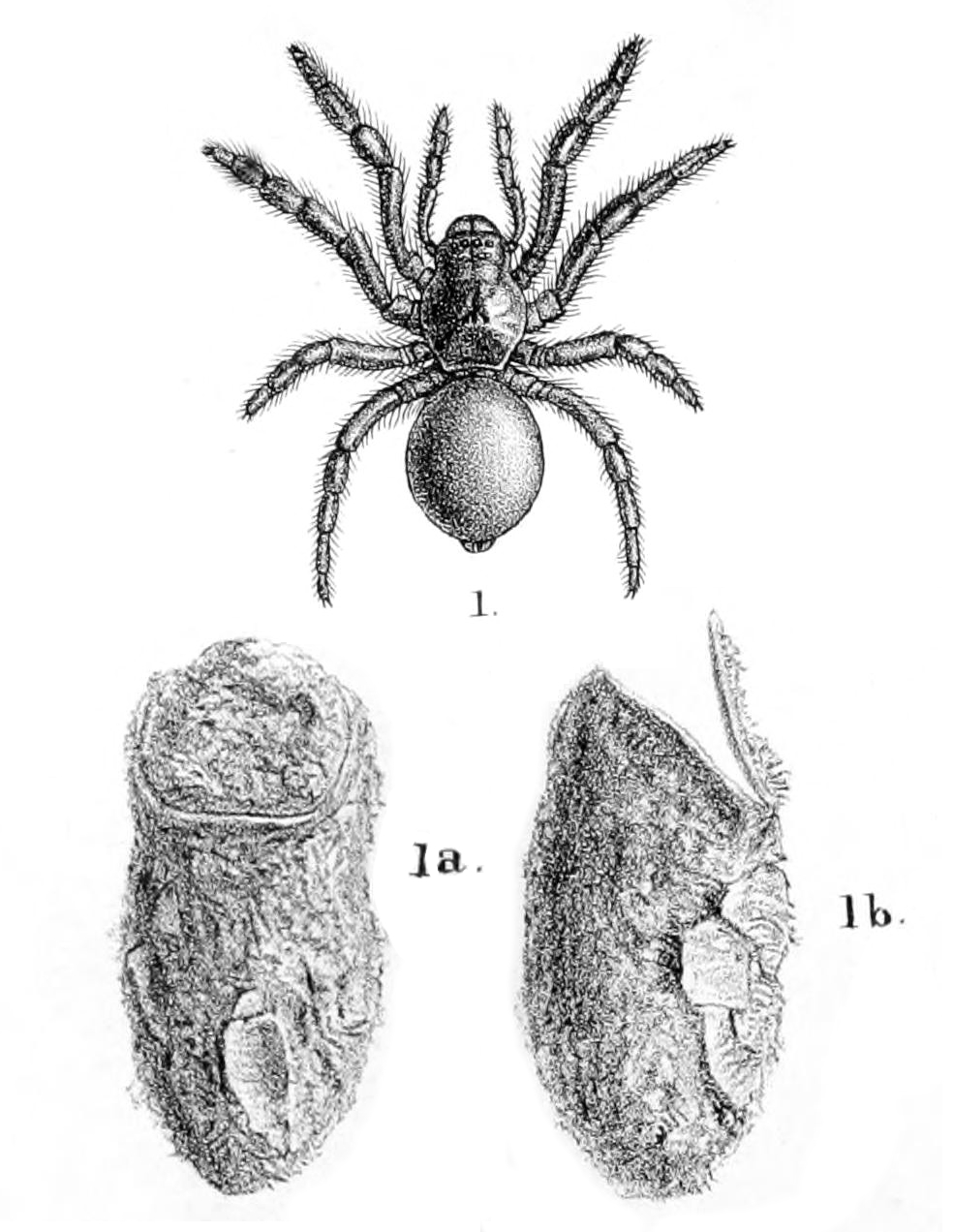
- P. perroti

Scientific classification
- Domain: Eukaryota
- Kingdom: Animalia
- Phylum: Arthropoda
- Subphylum: Chelicerata
- Class: Arachnida
- Order: Araneae
- Infraorder: Mygalomorphae
- Family: Migidae
- Genus: Paramigas; Pocock

Type species
- Paramigas perroti

Species
- 11, see text

= Paramigas =

Genus of spiders

Paramigas is a genus of tree trapdoor spiders native to Madagascar. It was first described by Reginald Innes Pocock in 1895.

== Species ==
As of February 2019, it contains eleven species:

- Paramigas alluaudi (Simon, 1903)
- Paramigas andasibe Raven, 2001
- Paramigas goodmani Griswold & Ledford, 2001
- Paramigas macrops Griswold & Ledford, 2001
- Paramigas manakambus Griswold & Ledford, 2001
- Paramigas milloti Griswold & Ledford, 2001
- Paramigas oracle Griswold & Ledford, 2001
- Paramigas pauliani (Dresco & Canard, 1975)
- Paramigas pectinatus Griswold & Ledford, 2001
- Paramigas perroti (Simon, 1891)
- Paramigas rothorum Griswold & Ledford, 2001
