= Mallecomigas =

Scientific classification
- Kingdom: Animalia
- Phylum: Arthropoda
- Subphylum: Chelicerata
- Class: Arachnida
- Order: Araneae
- Infraorder: Mygalomorphae
- Family: Migidae
- Genus: Mallecomigas
- Species: M. schlingeri

Binomial name
- Mallecomigas schlingeri Goloboff & Platnick, 1987

Genus of spiders

Mallecomigas is a genus of spiders in the family Migidae. It was first described in 1987 by Goloboff & Platnick. As of 2017, it contains only one Chilean species, Mallecomigas schlingeri.
