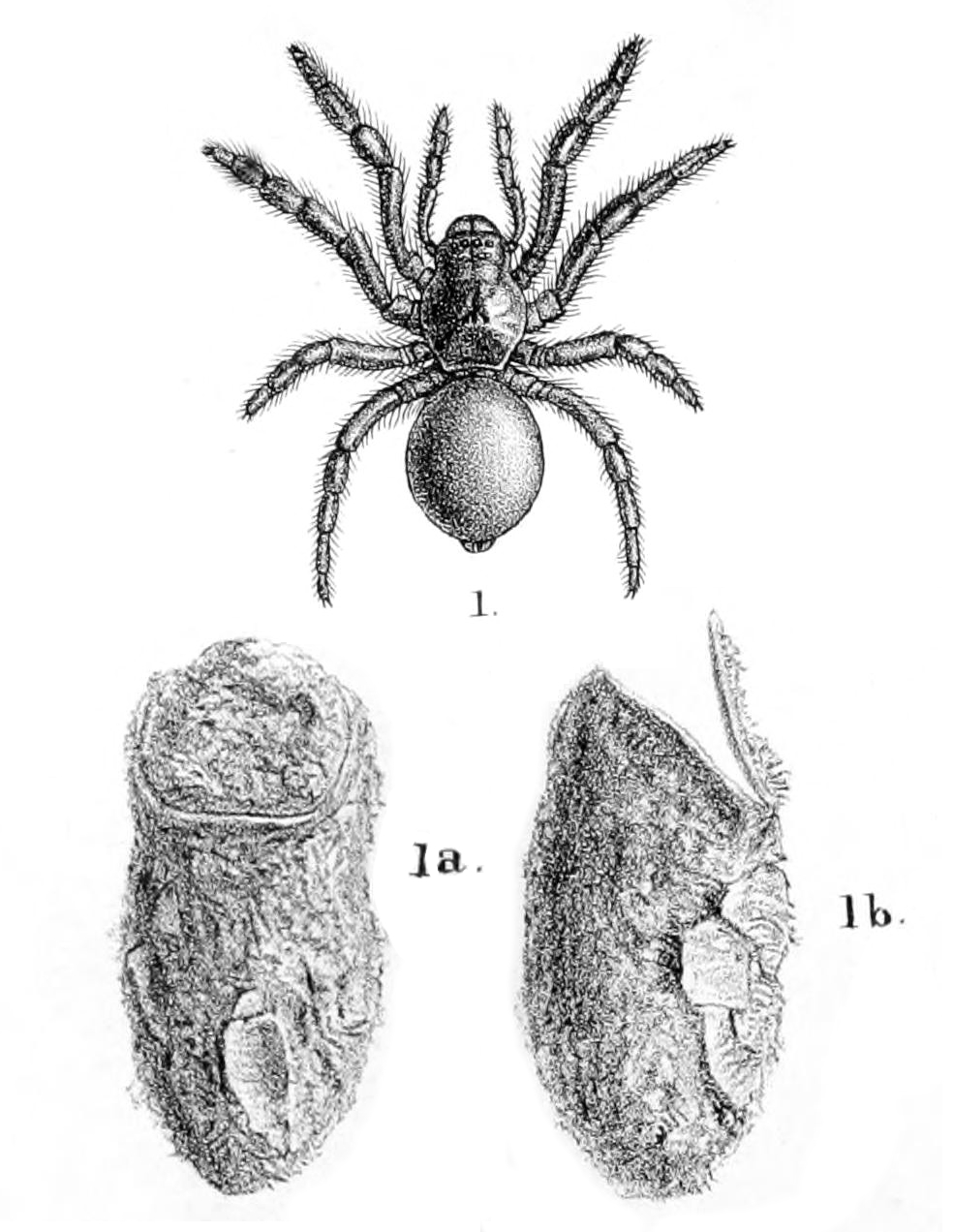
- Paramigas perroti
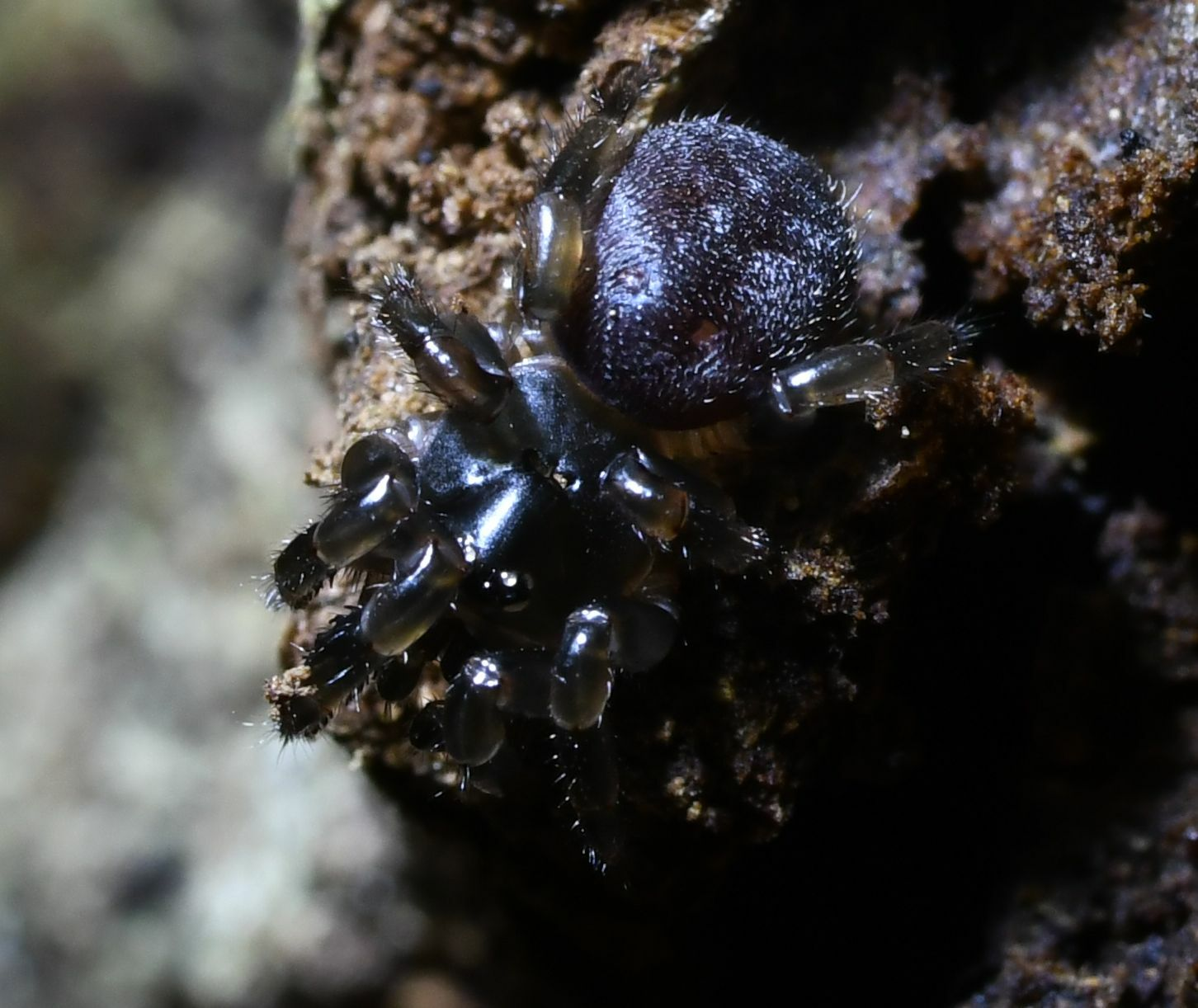
- Bertmainius tumidus from Australia

Scientific classification
- Kingdom: Animalia
- Phylum: Arthropoda
- Subphylum: Chelicerata
- Class: Arachnida
- Order: Araneae
- Infraorder: Mygalomorphae
- Clade: Avicularioidea
- Family: Migidae; Simon, 1889

Diversity
- 11 genera, 108 species
- blue: reported countries (WSC)

= Migidae =

Tree trapdoor spiders

Family of spiders

Migidae, also known as tree trapdoor spiders, is a family of spiders with about 100 species in eleven genera.

They are small to large spiders with little to no hair and build burrows with a trapdoor. Some species live in tree fern stems.

They have a Gondwanan distribution, found almost exclusively on the Southern Hemisphere, occurring in South America, Africa, Madagascar, Australia, New Zealand and New Caledonia.

== Genera ==
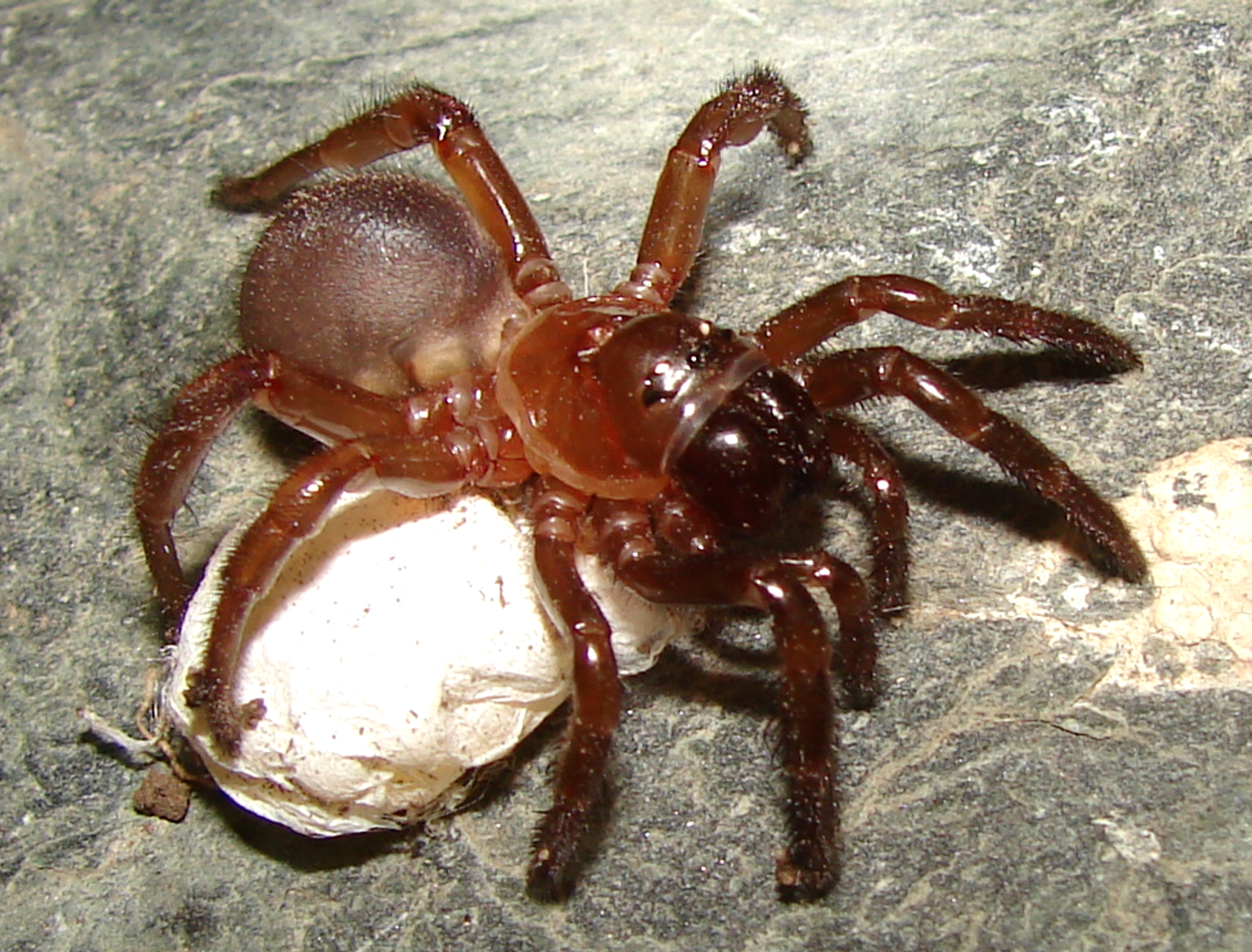
female Calathotarsus simoni

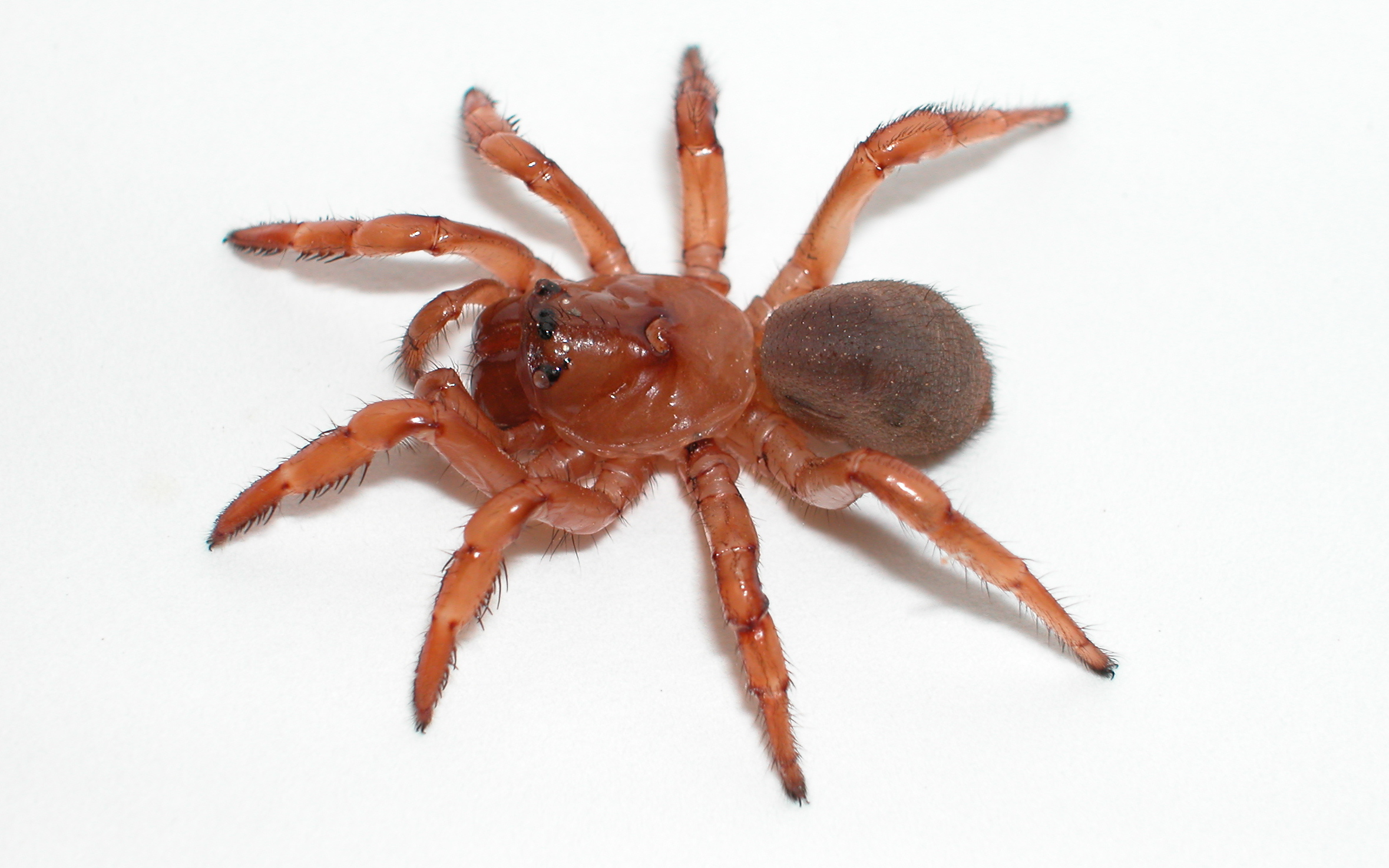
Moggridgea sp.

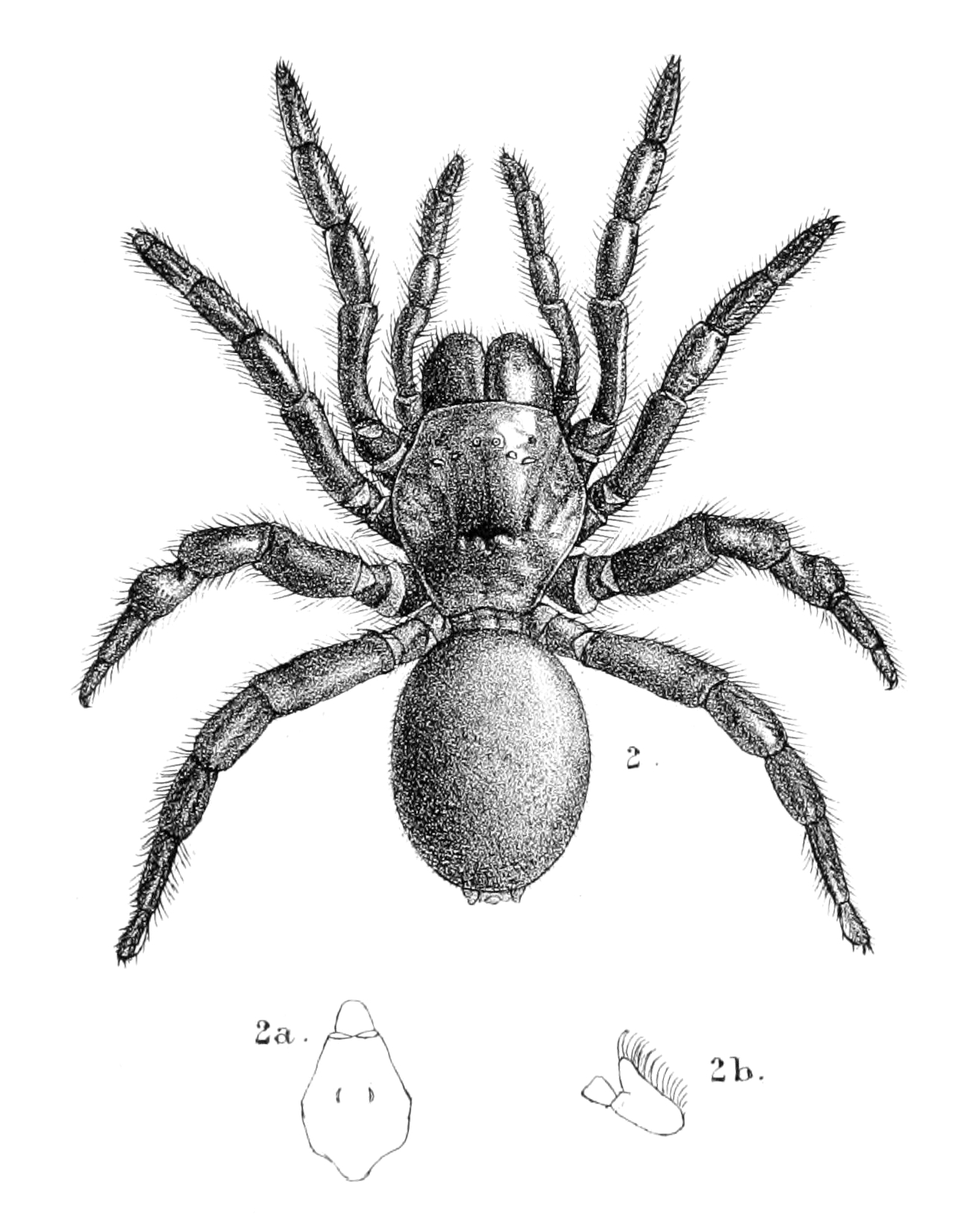
Thyropoeus mirandus

As of January 2026, this family includes eleven genera and 108 species:

- Bertmainius Harvey, Main, Rix & Cooper, 2015 – Australia
- Calathotarsus Simon, 1903 – Argentina, Chile
- Goloboffia Griswold & Ledford, 2001 – Chile
- Heteromigas Hogg, 1902 – Australia
- Mallecomigas Goloboff & Platnick, 1987 – Chile
- Micromesomma Pocock, 1895 – Madagascar
- Migas L. Koch, 1873 – Australia, New Caledonia, New Zealand
- Moggridgea O. Pickard-Cambridge, 1875 – Africa, Yemen, Australia
- Paramigas Pocock, 1895 – Madagascar
- Poecilomigas Simon, 1903 – Tanzania, South Africa
- Thyropoeus Pocock, 1895 – Madagascar
