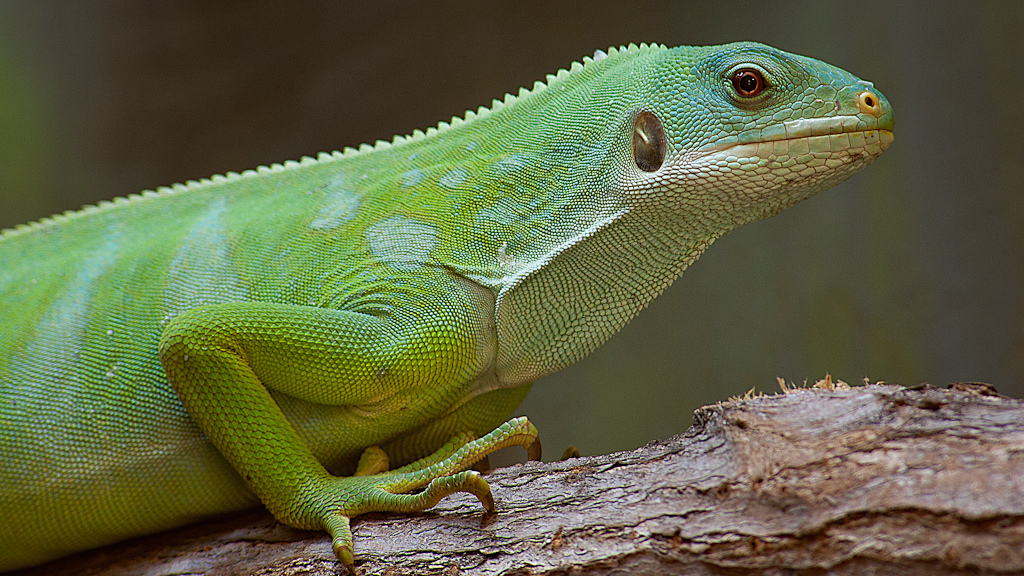
- Lau banded iguana in captivity

Conservation status
- Endangered (IUCN 3.1)
- CITES Appendix I

Scientific classification
- Kingdom: Animalia
- Phylum: Chordata
- Class: Reptilia
- Order: Squamata
- Suborder: Iguania
- Family: Iguanidae
- Genus: Brachylophus
- Species: B. fasciatus

Binomial name
- Brachylophus fasciatus (Brongniart, 1800)
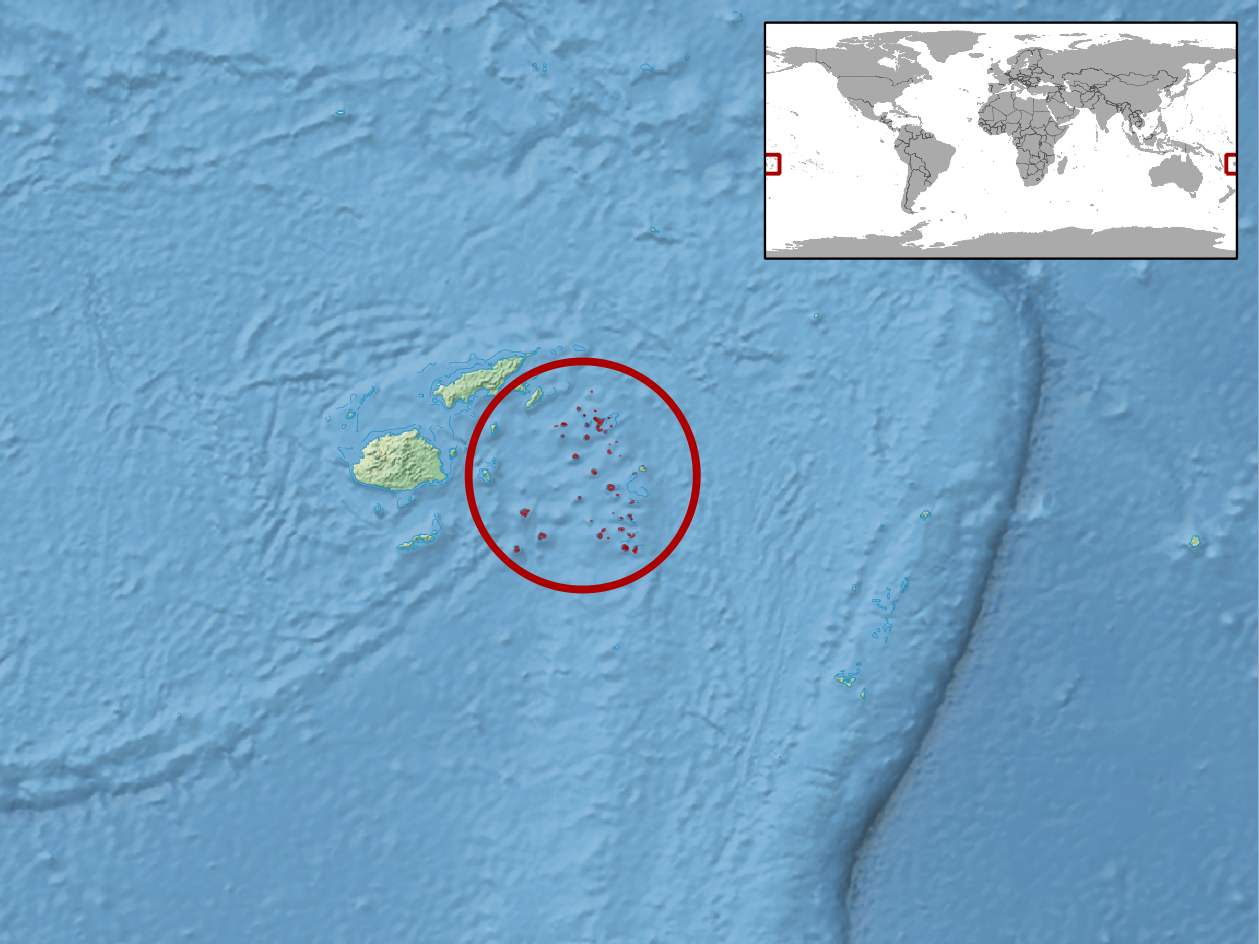

= Brachylophus fasciatus =

Species of lizard

Brachylophus fasciatus, the Lau banded iguana, is an arboreal species of lizard endemic to the Lau Islands of the eastern part of the Fijian archipelago. It is also found in Tonga, where it was probably introduced by humans. It is one of the few species of iguanas found outside of the American Continent and one of the most geographically isolated members of the family Iguanidae. Populations of these iguanas have been declining over the past century due to habitat destruction, and more significantly, the introduction of mongoose and house cats to the islands.

The species is diurnal, spending their days foraging, basking and watching over their territories by day and retreating to the treetops at night. Fiji iguanas are considered a national treasure by the government of Fiji, and its likeness has been featured on postage stamps, currency, and phone book covers.

== Taxonomy and etymology ==
This species was first described by French zoologist Alexandre Brongniart in 1800. The generic name, Brachylophus, is derived from two Greek words: brachys (βραχύς) meaning "short" and lophos (λόφος) meaning "crest" or "plume", denoting the short spiny crests along the back of this species. The specific name, fasciatus, is a Latin word meaning "banded".

This species is closely related to B. bulabula, B. gau and B. vitiensis. The genus Brachylophus is thought to be descended from ancestors that rafted 9,000 kilometres (5,600 mi) west across the Pacific Ocean from the Americas, where their closest relatives are found. It has also been suggested that they descended from a more widespread lineage of (now extinct) Old World iguanids that diverged from their New World relatives in the Paleogene. However, no other members of the putative lineage, living or fossil, have been found outside Fiji and Tonga.

== Distribution and habitat ==
The Lau banded iguana is endemic to the Lau Islands of Fiji. Its recent range is known to extend from Vanua Balavu in the north to Fulaga and Ogea in the south, including at least eleven islands. Previously it was reported from Moce and Oneata, and it may have once been present throughout the Lau group.

It was introduced to the Tonga Islands 300 years ago, probably after the native Brachylophus gibbonsi was driven to extinction.

== Description ==
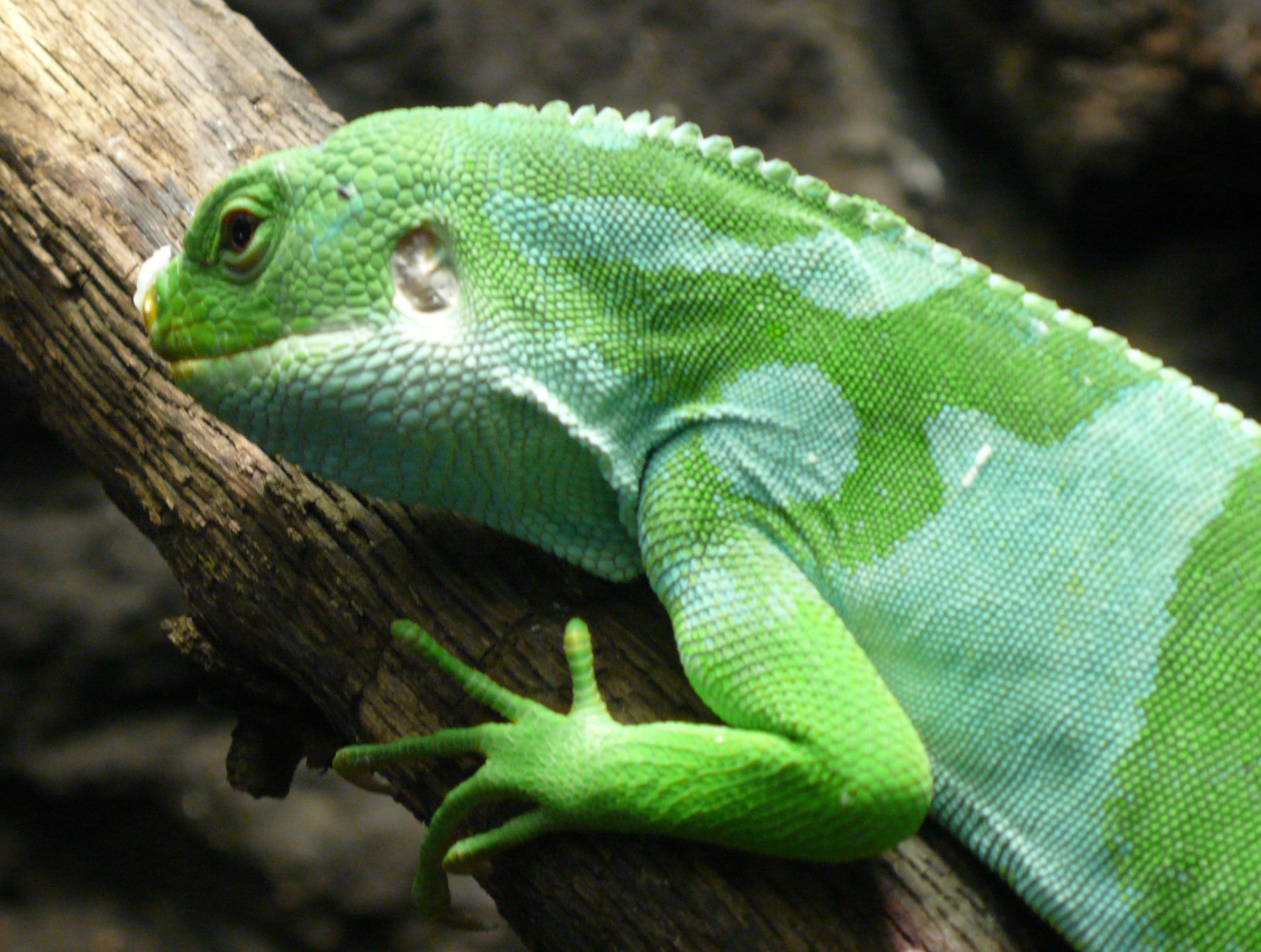
Close-up of a male Fiji banded iguana.

Sexually dimorphic, males have two or three white or pale-blue bands 2 centimetres (0.79 in) wide crossing their emerald green background with a pattern of spots and stripes on the nuchal region. Females, on the other hand, are solid green with occasional spotting or partial bands. Both sexes have a yellow underside. Fiji banded iguanas reach 60 centimetres (24 in) in length when measured from snout to tail tip and bodyweights of up to 200 grams (0.44 lb). The crests of these iguanas are very short reaching a length of 0.5 centimetres (0.20 in).

Although there appear to be slight variations between insular populations, none have been well-described. The animals from Tonga are smaller and leaner, and were previously described as B. brevicephalus.

The skin of this species is sensitive to light and the lizard can change its skin color to match its background. Captive specimens have been observed matching the pattern left by the screen tops of their cages in as little as 30 seconds.

== Behavior ==
The species is diurnal, spending their days foraging, basking and watching over their territories by day and retreating to the treetops at night. Male iguanas are highly visual, and aggressively defend their territories from rival males. The iguanas will deepen their green coloration to intensify their bands, and bob their heads and intimidate intruders by lunging at them with open mouths. They often expand and flare their dewlaps to increase the size of their profile, following up with violent battles amongst each other.

== Diet ==
Fiji banded iguanas are herbivorous; they feed on the leaves, fruit, and flowers of trees and shrubs, particularly hibiscus flowers of the Vau tree (Hibiscus tiliaceus) and fruit such as banana and papaya. Captive hatchlings have been observed eating insects; however, adults usually will not.

== Reproduction ==
Courtship is similar to other iguanids, with males approaching and tongue flicking the female's back, forelimbs and nuchal regions after a series of rapid head bobs. The breeding season occurs during the month of November. The Fiji banded iguana is oviparous and has a long incubation period of 160–170 days. Females guard the nest of three to six eggs, which is unusual for iguanids. Hatchlings emerge from their eggs in the rainy season and obtain moisture by licking wet leaves.

== Relations with humans ==
=== Folklore ===
The Fijian name for iguana is "vokai", although some tribes call it "saumuri". Two tribes regard the iguana as their totem and as such its name is not allowed to be mentioned in the presence of women or the offender may be beaten with a stick. The majority of Fijians, however, are terrified of iguanas because of their behavior when threatened. On such occasions, an iguana turns black, opens its mouth and lunges at attackers.

=== Threats ===
The biggest threats this iguana faces is habitat loss due to fires, storms, agricultural development, and competition from feral goats. A secondary threat is introduced predators in the forms of rats, mongoose, and cats which prey on the iguanas and their eggs. Additionally the iguana has been hunted as a food source and for the illegal exotic animal trade.

=== Captivity ===
Since 1982 the Fijian government has maintained that the entire zoo population of Fiji banded iguanas was obtained illegally or descended from smuggled animals: "Virtually all of the estimated 50–100 banded iguanas in American zoos have been obtained without the knowledge or consent of the Government of Fiji". The husbandry of Fiji banded iguanas at the San Diego Zoo has been documented as the most successful breeding colony of Fiji banded iguanas in the world.
