= Moggridge =

Moggridge is a surname. Notable people with the name include:

- Bill Moggridge (1943–2012), British designer, author and educator
- Hal Moggridge, British landscape architect
- John Traherne Moggridge (1842–1874), British botanist, entomologist, and arachnologist

== See also ==
- Moggridgea, a genus of spiders
- Mogridge (surname)
