= M. terrestris =

M. terrestris may refer to:

- Moggridgea terrestris, a spider species
- Muriella terrestris, an alga species
- Mycoleptodiscus terrestris, a plant pathogen species

== See also ==
- Terrestris
