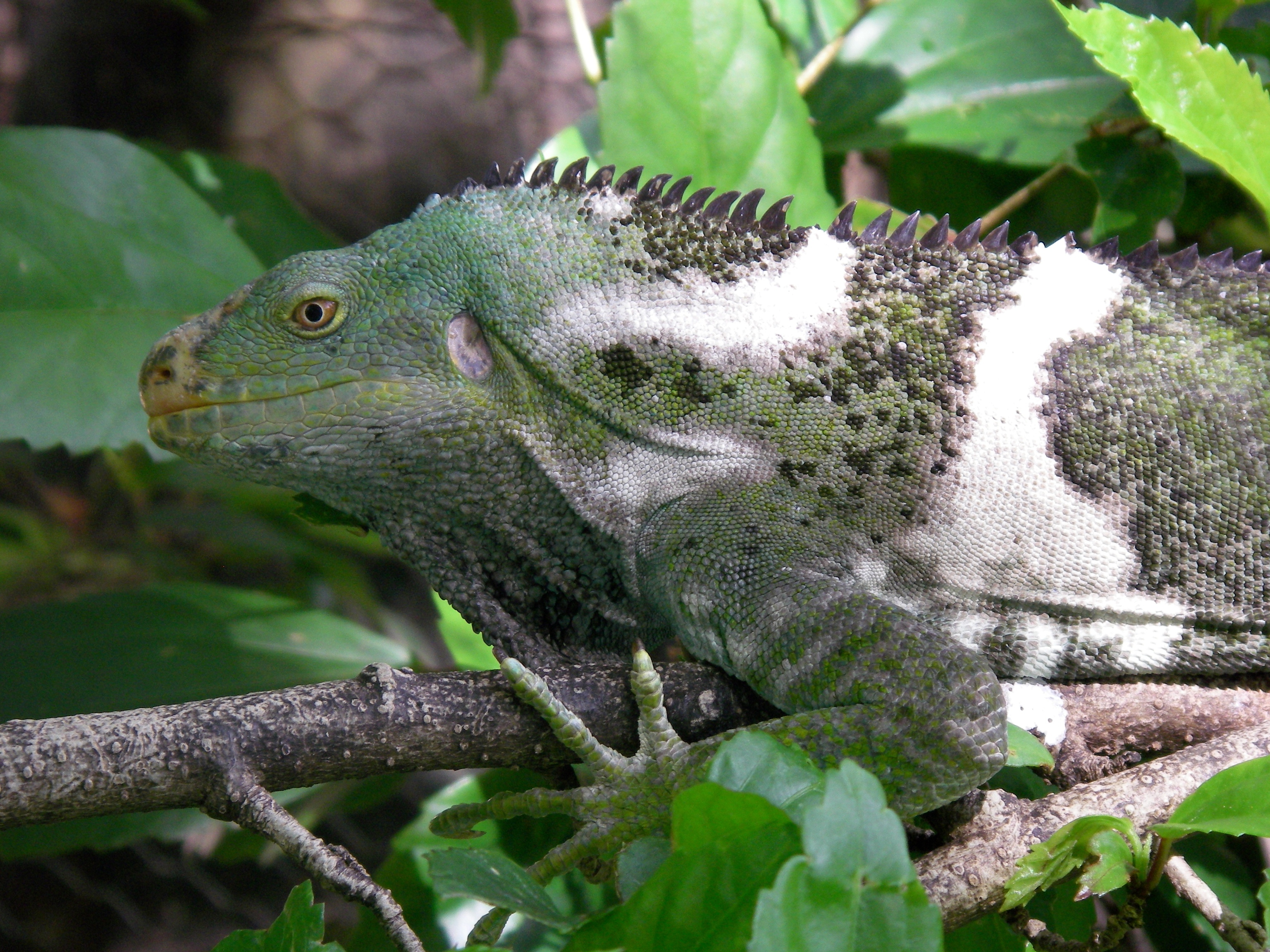
- In the Melbourne Zoo

Conservation status
- Critically Endangered (IUCN 3.1)
- CITES Appendix I

Scientific classification
- Kingdom: Animalia
- Phylum: Chordata
- Class: Reptilia
- Order: Squamata
- Suborder: Iguania
- Family: Iguanidae
- Genus: Brachylophus
- Species: B. vitiensis

Binomial name
- Brachylophus vitiensis Gibbons, 1981
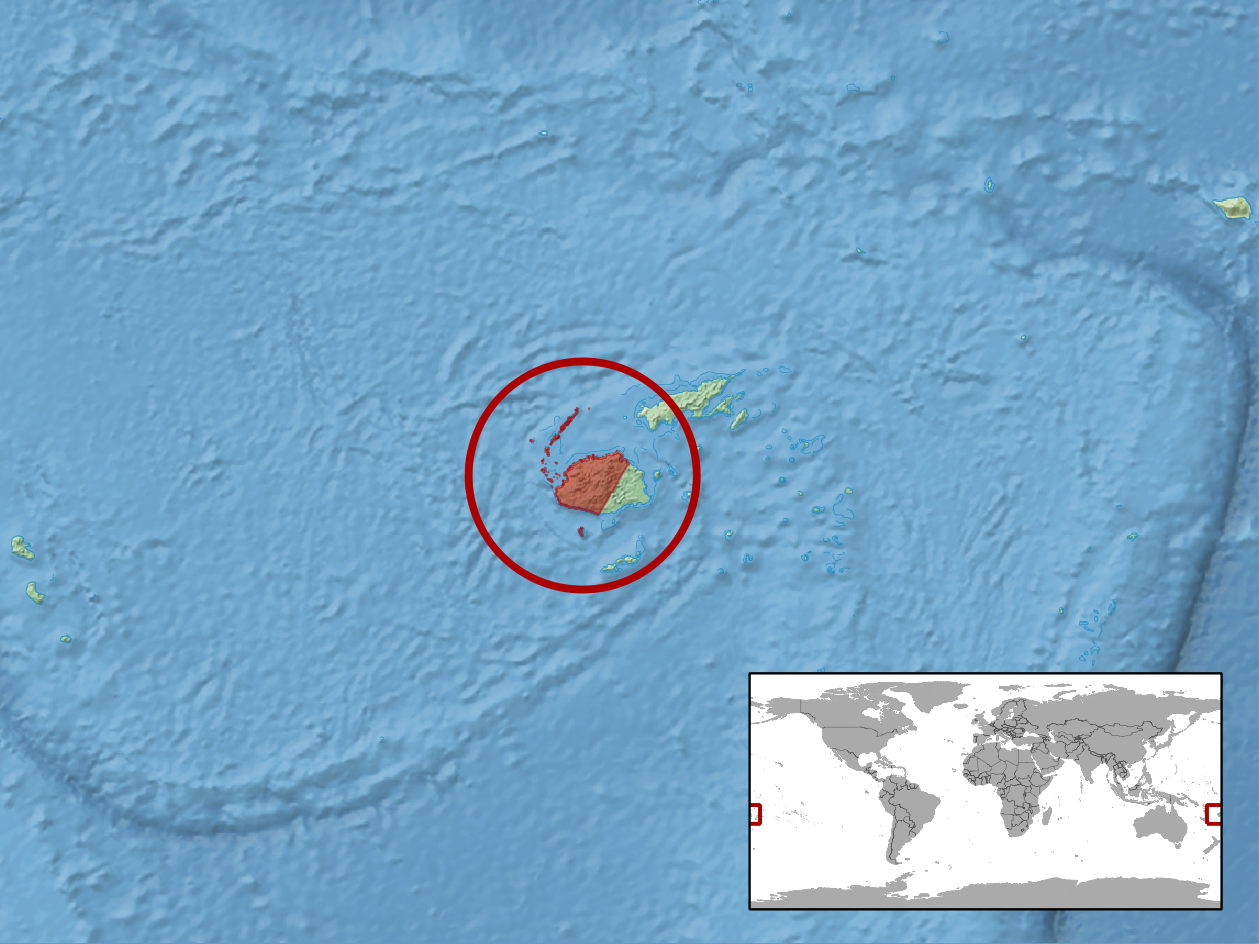

= Fiji crested iguana =

Species of lizard

The Fiji crested iguana or Fijian crested iguana (Brachylophus vitiensis) is a critically endangered species of iguana native to some of the northwestern islands of the Fijiian archipelago, where it is found in dry forest on Yadua Taba (west of Vanua Levu), Yadua, Macuata, Yaquaga, Devuilau (Goat island), Malolo, Monu and Monuriki.

== Discovery ==
The discovery of B. vitiensis is partially indebted to The Blue Lagoon. Much of the movie was filmed on a remote island in Fiji and shots of the native wildlife, including a large colorful iguanid, were included. Herpetologist Dr. John Gibbons of the University of the South Pacific had discovered the iguana on a different Fijian island, but it was not until his associate had spotted the same iguana among the film's wildlife that its larger range was known. Gibbons described the new species in 1981 with reference to The Blue Lagoon.

== Taxonomy and etymology ==
The generic name, Brachylophus, is derived from two Greek words: brachys (βραχῦς) meaning "short" and lophos (λοφος) meaning "crest" or "plume", denoting the short spiny crests along the back of this species. The specific name, vitiensis, is a Latin toponymic adjective derived from the Fijian word for Fiji.

The species B. vitiensis is closely related to the Lau banded iguana (B. fasciatus) and Fiji banded iguana (B. bulabula). The southwest Pacific iguanas of the genus Brachylophus and the related extinct genus Lapitiguana are thought to be descended from ancestral iguanas that rafted 9,000 km (5,600 mi) west across the Pacific Ocean from the Americas, where their closest relatives are found.

== Habitat ==
B. vitiensis is found on the islands of Fiji, in the South Pacific. The species is restricted to tropical dry forests, specifically to the rain shadow forests located on certain islands in Fiji. These forests are one of the most threatened vegetation types in the Pacific. A small population of the Fiji crested iguana – fewer than 80 individuals – can be found on the small island of Macuata. The majority of this species – fewer than 4,000 individuals – is most commonly found on the island of Yadua Taba. The island is a National Trust of Fiji reserve, and is thus the only legally protected population of the Fiji crested iguana. The island is now also free of forest burning and the presence of goats, which was a major factor in the initial decline of the species. There are some other Fijian islands where evidence of the species has been recorded: Deviulau, Waya, Monuriki, Monu, Qalito (possibly extinct), Yaquaga, Yadua, Yaduataba and Malolo Levu.

A small protected forestation area was created recently on Malolo Levu for the last few crested iguanas that were found on that island. Juveniles have been reported on the site, indicating some degree of reproduction is ongoing. However, the outlook for this subpopulation is a matter of great concern. According to Steve Anstey of Ahura Resorts there are currently only 15 iguanas left in the forest remnants at Likuliku Lodge and 6 at Malolo Resort. Conservation programs initiated for the Likuliku and Malolo populations include a captive head start facility and reforestation programs led by Likuliku's environmental officer Sia Rasalato. The species probably inhabited land up to 500 m (1,600 ft) above sea level in the recent past, but is currently only found at elevations of 100 m (330 ft) or less.

An additional population of Fiji crested iguanas occurs on the same island within the grounds of Six Senses Fiji. Since the resort opened in 2018, conservation management has been implemented within approximately one hectare of tropical dry forest on the property. Monitoring data indicate that the local iguana population increased by approximately 65% between 2022 and 2025, suggesting positive population trends under habitat protection and management.

== Description ==
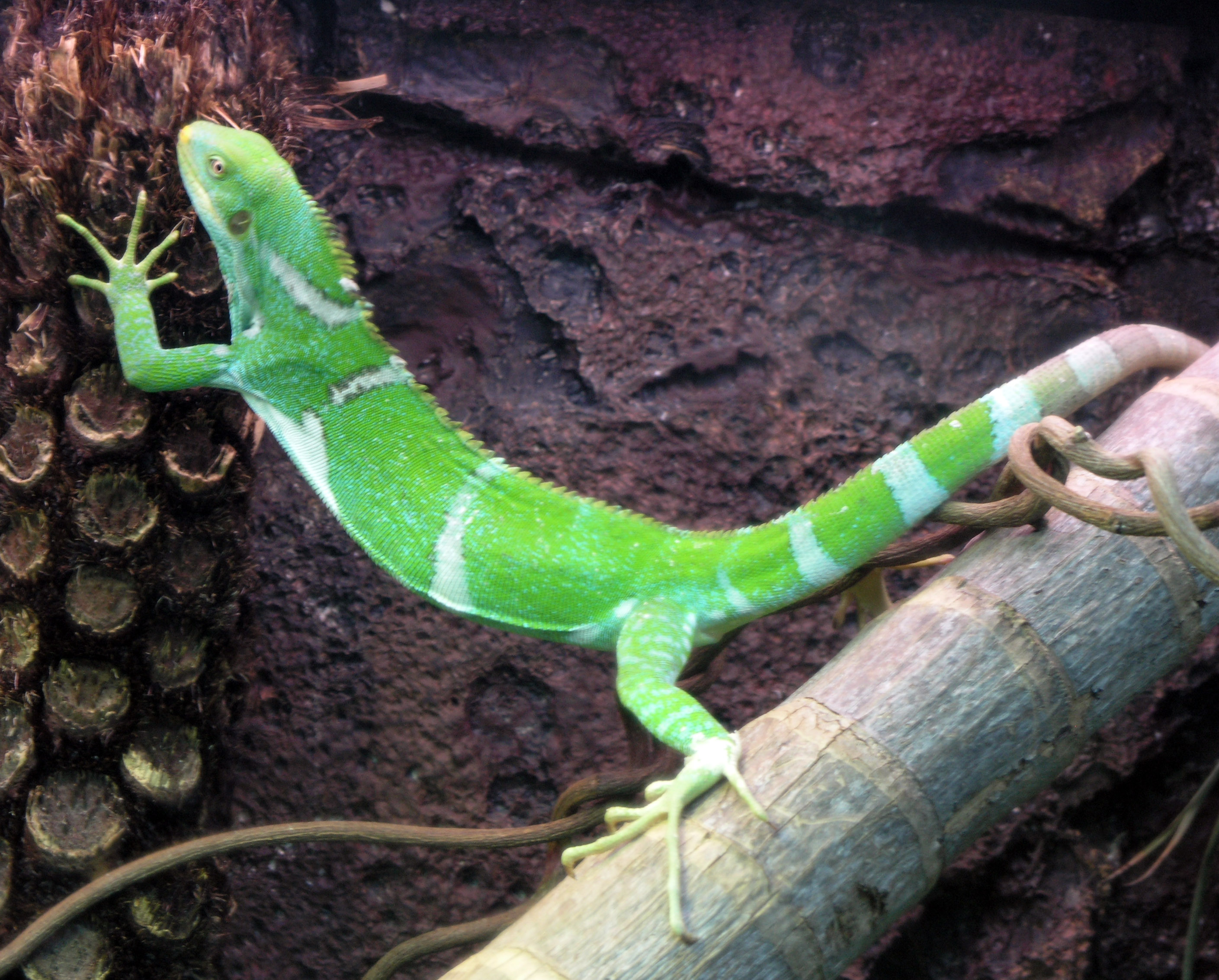
A Fiji crested iguana in the Perth Zoo

The Fiji crested iguana is a large stocky lizard distinguished from the Fiji banded iguana by the presence of three narrow, cream to white colored bands on males, rather than the broader bluish bands of the latter species. These whitish bands often have chevrons of black scales close to them. Brachylophus vitiensis is distinguished by its larger size growing to 75 centimetres (30 in) in length and weighing as much as 300 grams (0.66 lb). It is further distinguished by the presence of a taller spiny "crest" on its back with spines as long as 1.5 centimetres (0.59 in) running from the nape of the neck to the base of its tail.

When Fiji crested iguanas first hatch from their eggs they are dark green, but after several hours their skin becomes bright emerald green and narrow white bands can be seen along their body. Their eyes are reddish orange or pinkish gold in color.

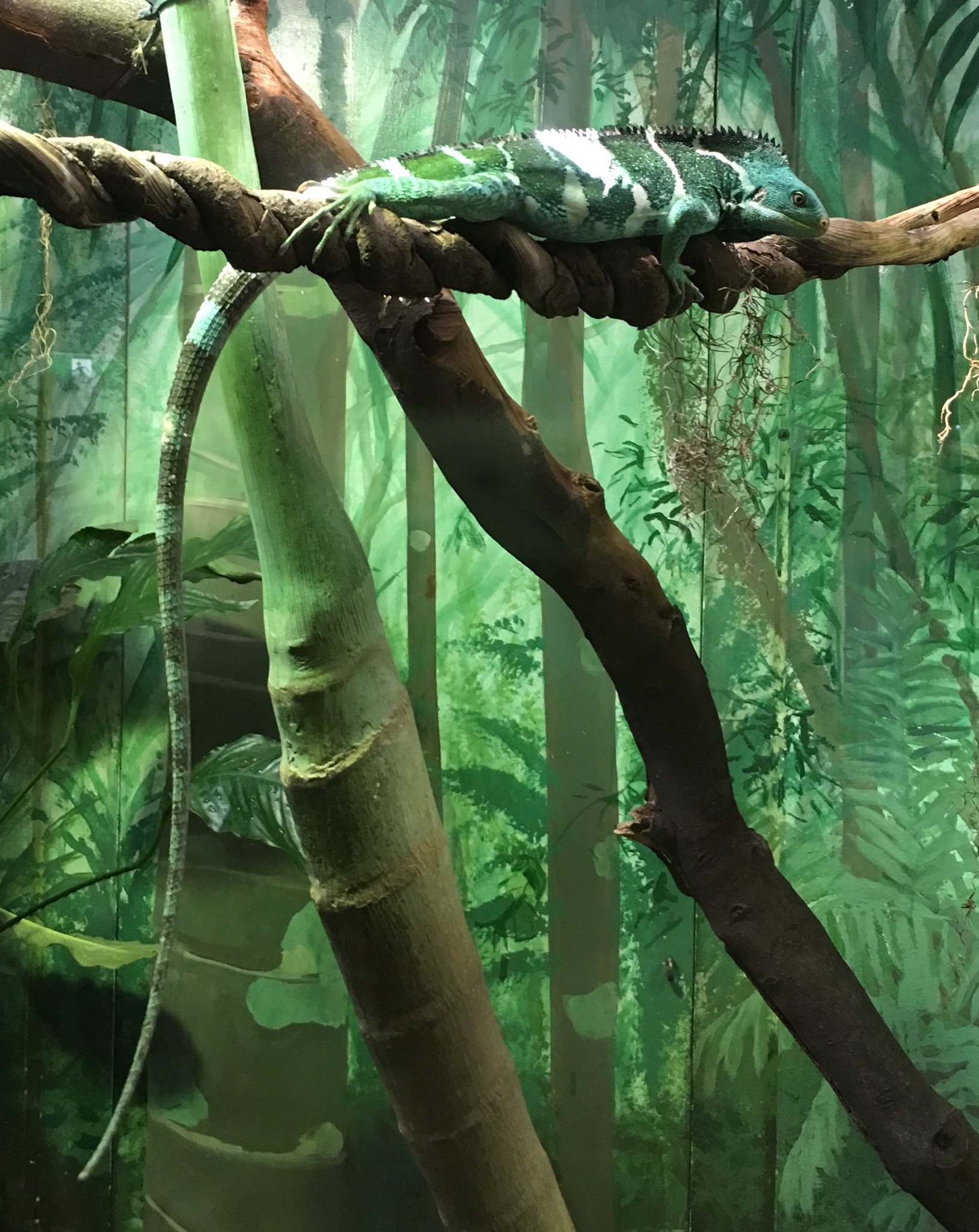
A Fijian crested iguana with the full length of its tail visible, photographed at Taronga Zoo Sydney

== Behaviour ==
The Fiji crested iguana is a diurnal creature that tends to live under the shade of trees and will seek sunlight/heat on days with cool temperature. It has the ability to rapidly change colour from green to black when aroused. It uses this ability when threatened by any potential predator in its surroundings. These colours will vary depending on the severity of the situation, bright green is standard, dark green would be slightly dangerous, and black would be an extreme. If its white bands or its sudden change in colour has not intimidated its predator, it will ultimately resort to an expansion of its neck, a bobbing of its head, and it will pounce itself towards the potential threat. In order to move from tree to tree where it usually resides, it uses the overlapping branches in order to move effectively through their environments. Their long toes and tails help them keep balance while they move through the trees.

== Diet ==
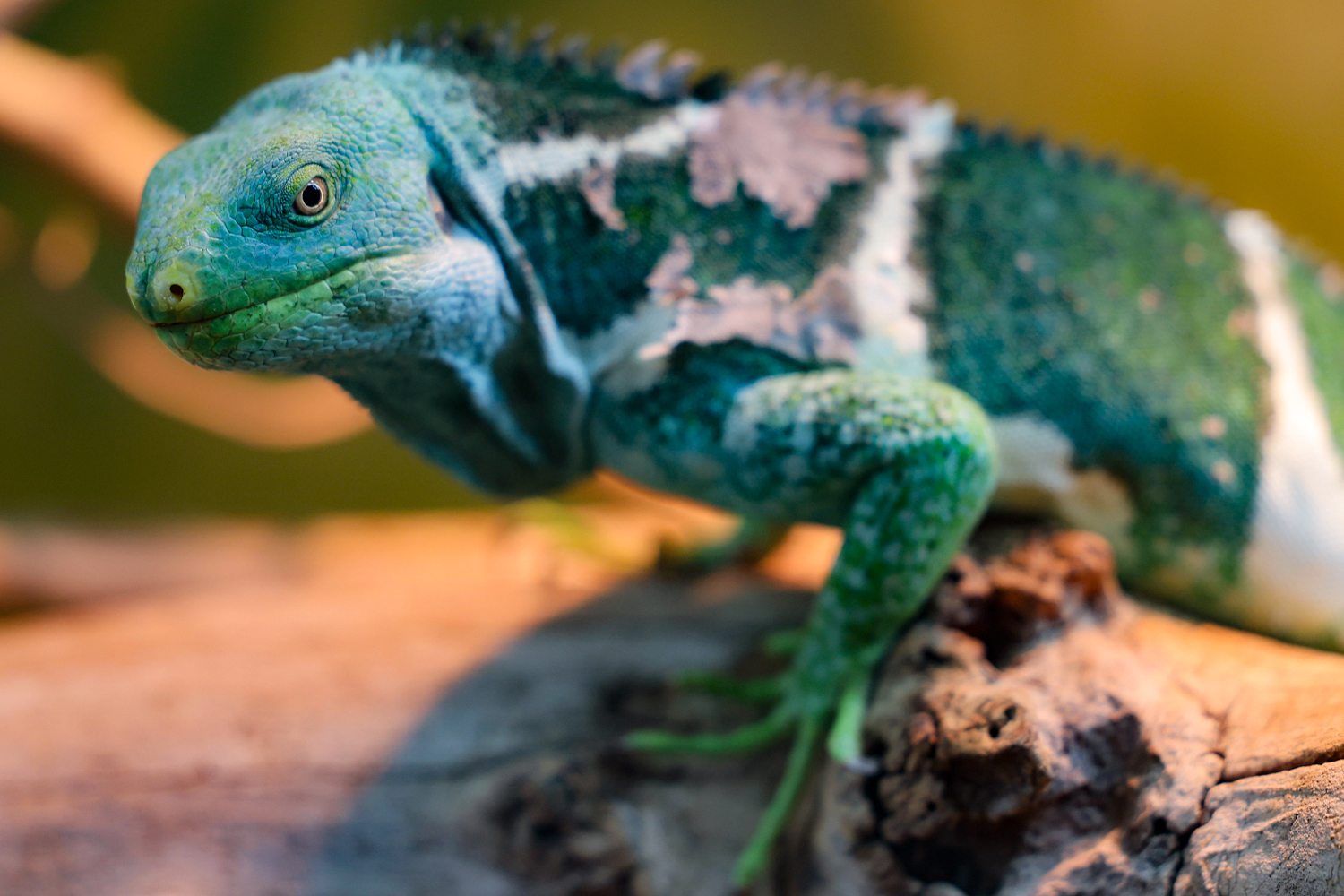
Fiji crested iguana in the Melbourne Zoo

Fiji crested iguanas are predominantly herbivorous feeding on the leaves, fruits, shoots, and flowers from trees and shrubs. These iguanas eat both the new leaves and the large flowers from trees and shrubs. Hence, it is restricted and limited to tropical dry forests and similar habitats on islands in western Fiji. Furthermore, the Fiji crested iguanas particularly have a preference for sweet hibiscus flowers of the Vau tree (Hibiscus tiliaceus). The vau tree is one of the species of trees where they spend most of their time residing. Fiji crested iguanas do not display any major or significant seasonal shifts, sex differences, or age-class differences in their diet patterns. Moreover, scientists have observed captive hatchlings even eating insects; nonetheless, adults will not.

== Reproduction ==
The Fiji crested iguana, similar to all other iguanas, reproduces by laying eggs. The breeding season takes place between March and April, with courtship and mating commencing in January. They lay large white eggs, which have a leathery texture. The species is oviparous and has one of the longest incubation periods of any reptile, which can last from 189 days to nine months. Female iguanas are usually found defending the eggs and guard the nest of four to six eggs. Females dig holes on the forest floor, where three to five eggs are laid and they then fill the hole or burrow. The eggs are white and leathery, with the average number of eggs in a clutch being four.

Eggs take roughly 8–9 months (October–November) to hatch and this occurs at the beginning of the wet season. A few of weeks prior to hatching, a brown oval mark arises on the surface of the egg. This oval mark identifies the spot where the baby iguana's head will pop out of the egg. Sometimes, a full day can pass before the Fiji crested iguana hatches from the egg. After hatching, the baby iguanas obtain moisture by licking wet leaves.

== In the Fijian language ==
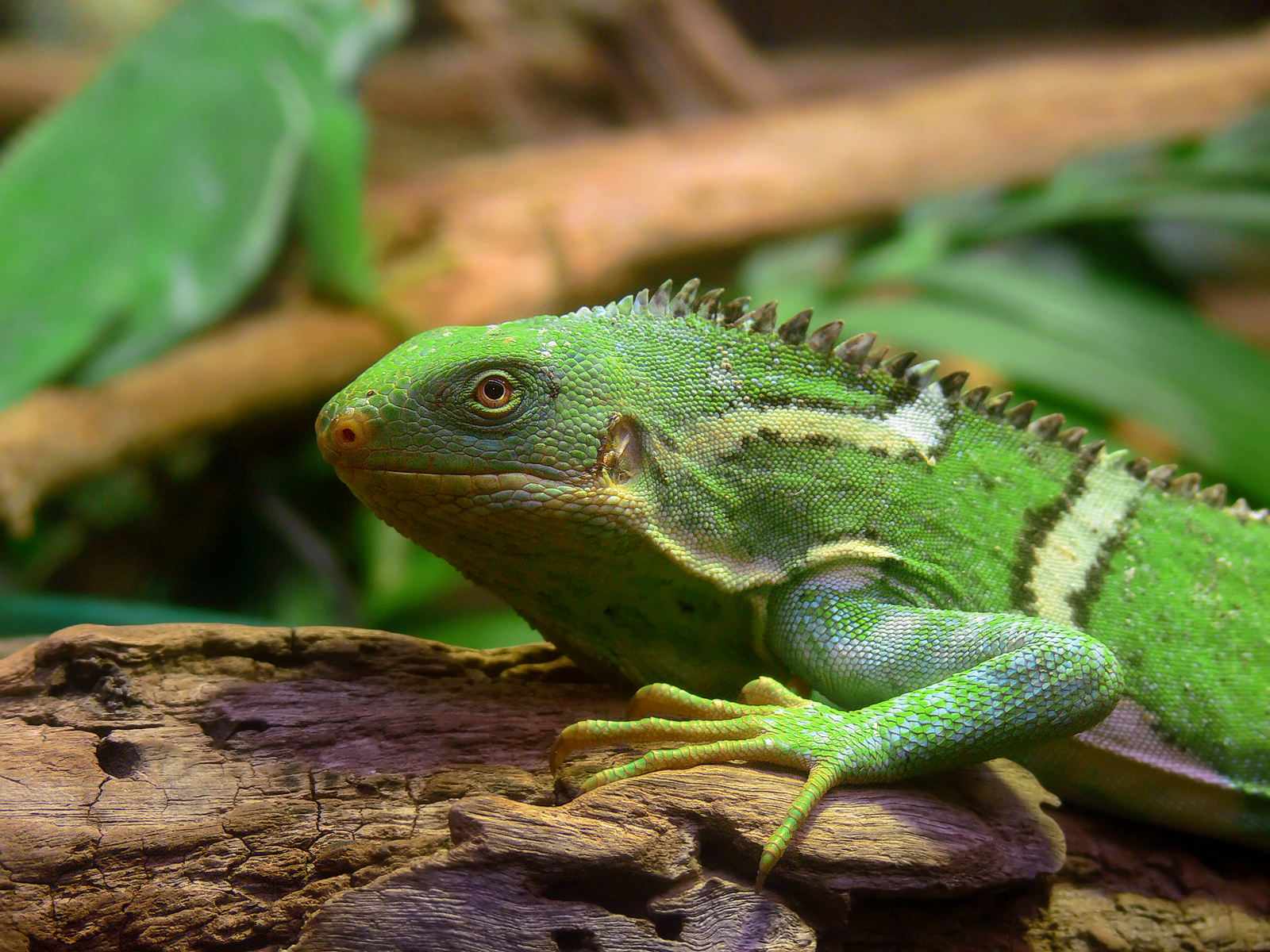
In the Melbourne Zoo

The Fijian name for iguana is vokai, although some tribes call it saumuri.

== Threats ==
The biggest threat the Fiji crested iguana faces is habitat loss due to fires, storms, agricultural development, and competition from feral goats. Goats were introduced to Yadua Taba in 1972 and numbered over 200 by the late 1970s. The vegetation on the island during this time was severely depleted by a combination of grazing and fires used to drive goats for ease of capture. After the discovery of the Fiji crested iguana, the island was declared a sanctuary and all but a few goats were removed and fires banned. As a result, the dry forest on the island has recovered to a great extent and is the best remaining example of Pacific dry forest. Invasive Leucaena trees threaten the regeneration of native food trees for the iguanas, but the government of Fiji has taken steps to eradicate the trees.

A secondary threat is introduced predators in the forms of rats, mongooses, and cats which prey on the Fiji crested iguana and its eggs. Additionally the lizard has been hunted as a food source and for the illegal animal trade.

In 2002, five adult Fiji crested iguanas were stolen from the sanctuary, but Fiji Custom officers caught the smuggler before he boarded his international flight. Since this incident, tourist visits to the sanctuary have been prohibited and only researchers are permitted to visit the island. In order to protect iguanas in the sanctuary from diseases and parasites, it is not permitted to return to the island any lizard that has been removed. Wildlife trafficking continues to be a major impediment to conducting conservation outreach for this species as the traffickers are targeting the sites where conservation investments are being made further putting the species at risk of extinction.

== Conservation ==
Due to the removal of the goats, forest area was increased by 10–20% since 1980, which means more resources for the Fiji crested iguana and a larger environment. There are many other recommended actions that should be taken in order for them to survive. A major threat to the Fiji crested iguana is posed by introduced predators such as feral cats, rats, and mongooses. It is widely campaigned that physical measures should be taken to protect the iguanas from cats and mongooses, which include removing them from the area similar to the removal of the goats. Also, the only island being monitored is Yadua Taba Island. Other islands inhabited by Fiji crested iguanas such as Macuata, Monu, and Monuriki are also being campaigned to be monitored. Another action that have been raised is reforestation. The iguanas need more resources in order to repopulate, which means having more trees growing on the island may increase food sources for the Fiji crested iguana and hence repopulate the area.

However, the available data on this species is fairly limited. There is little data on "the effects of direct or indirect factors potentially responsible for causing the population crash." Without some detailed data on that topic, "any Species Recovery Plan developed is not likely to be cost effective and may fail to achieve the desired results."

At Six Senses Fiji, funded by the resort Regenerative Impact Fund, a conservation program is in place and key conservation actions at the site include habitat protection, restoration, predator management, monitoring, and public education. Approximately one hectare of native tropical dry forest—known locally as the Green Belt—has been protected as the core area where the population was rediscovered. By 2024, iguanas were observed naturally dispersing into adjacent areas, likely due to increasing population density. In response, active habitat restoration was initiated, with around 5,500 m² placed under restoration through native species planting, invasive plant control, and habitat creation. Natural regeneration is the focus, complemented by the plating of native trees important to the iguana’s diet. In 2025, an additional 15,000 square meters were designated to reforestation, with regeneration works starting early 2026. Predator management efforts focus on feral cats, the only significant predator of iguanas on the island. In 2025, a partnership was established with Animals Fiji to manage the feral cat population. Annual population surveys are conducted to monitor population size and habitat use, informing adaptive conservation management. Educational initiatives include guided wildlife walks and seasonal tree-planting activities for visitors and staff.

In December 2025, Six Senses Fiji supported the translocation of 15 Fiji crested iguanas from Malolo Island to Qalito Island. Translocation is a conservation strategy used to establish additional populations and reduce extinction risk associated with disease, natural disasters, or restricted habitat range. Qalito Island historically supported Fiji crested iguanas, although no confirmed sightings had been recorded since the 1980s. The island retains one of Fiji’s most intact native tropical dry forests, making it suitable for population re-establishment. The translocated iguanas are being monitored by Fijian conservation student Manasa Vula, with support from Auckland Zoo, to collect data that will guide future translocation efforts. The translocation project involved collaboration among Six Senses Fiji, Castaway Island, Fiji, the Mamanuca Environment Society, the Fiji Ministry of Environment, Auckland Zoo, traditional landowners, and conservation biologist Dr. Peter Harlow.
