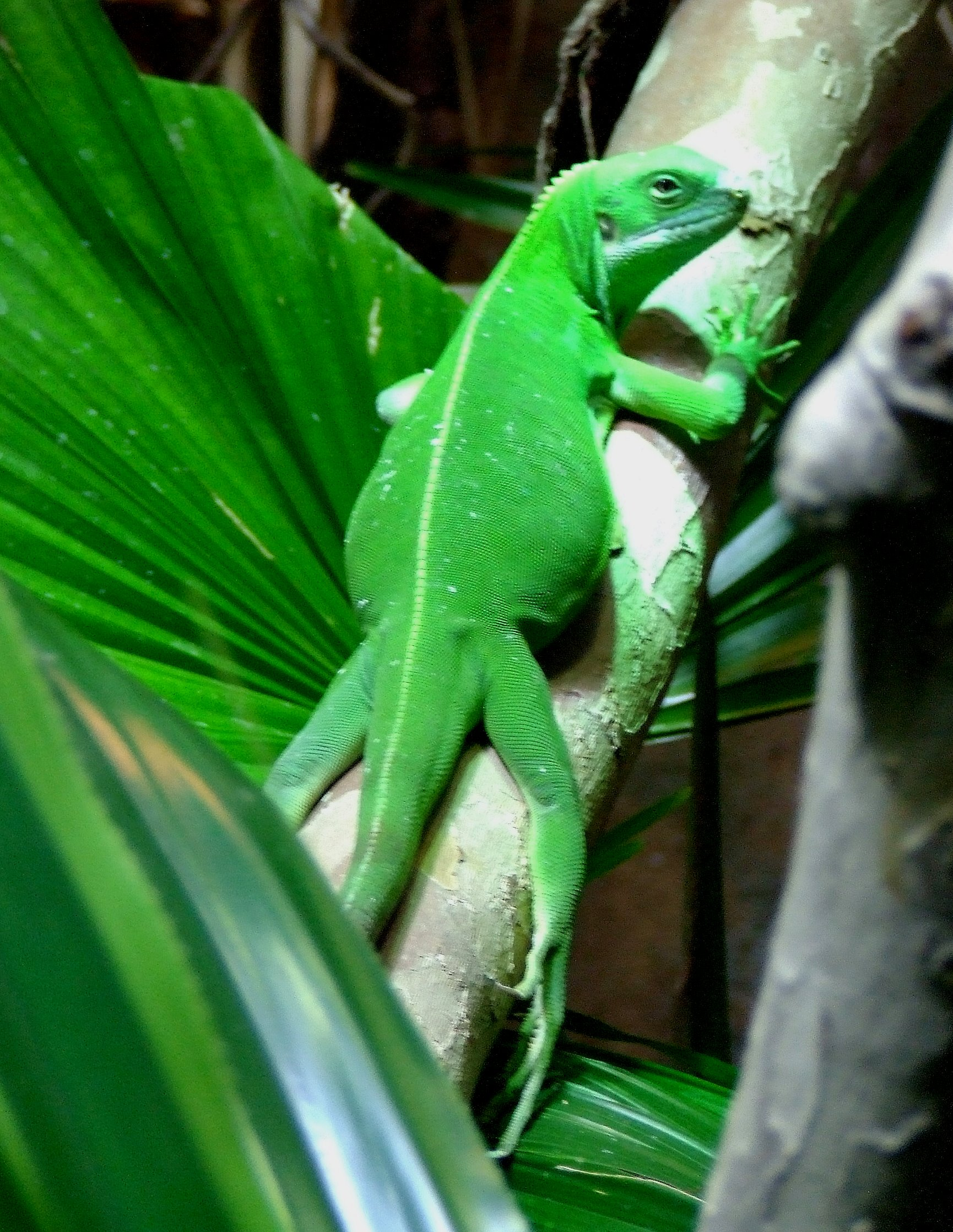
- Female, Cologne Zoological Garden
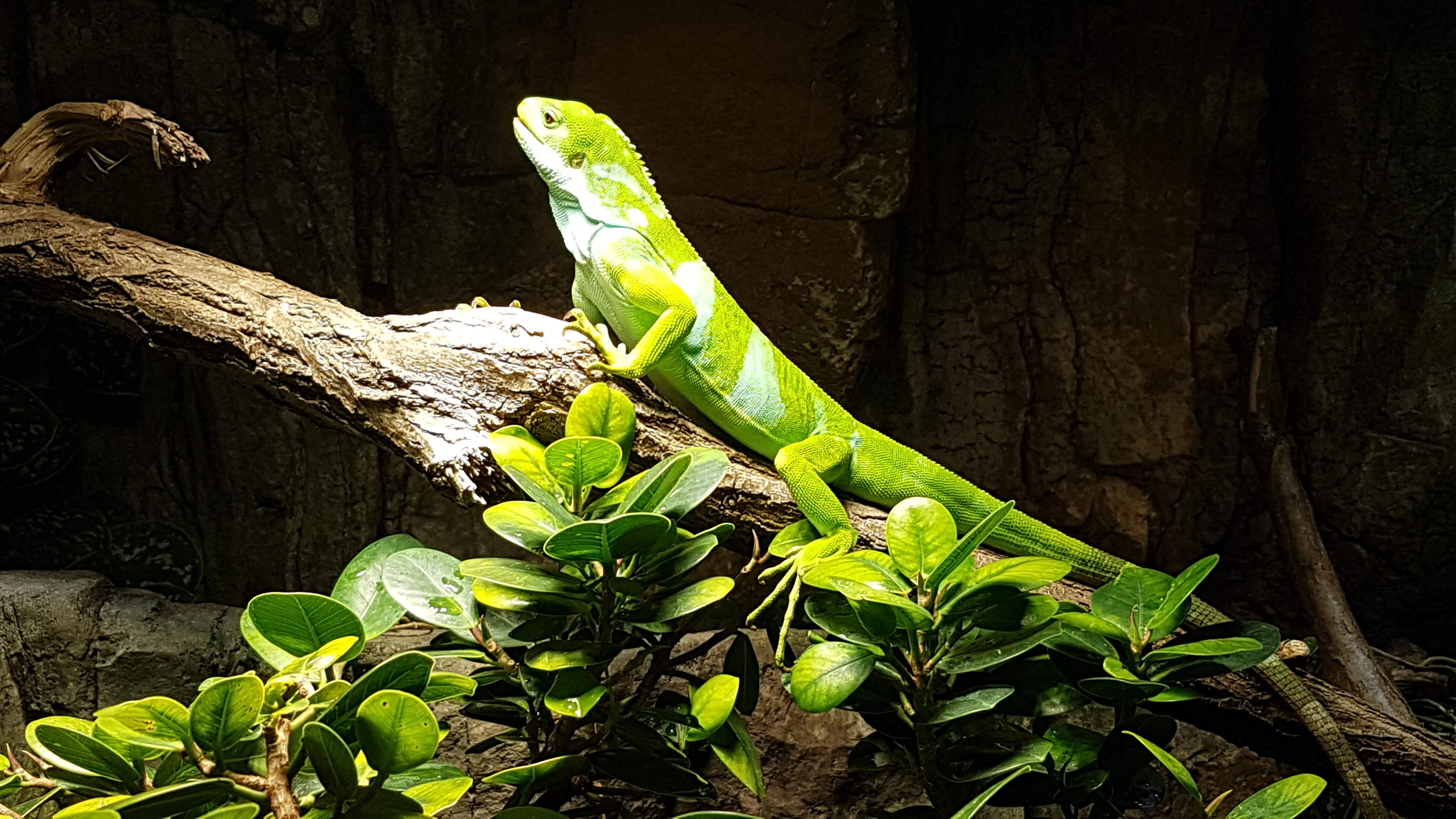
- Male

Conservation status
- Endangered (IUCN 3.1)
- CITES Appendix I

Scientific classification
- Kingdom: Animalia
- Phylum: Chordata
- Class: Reptilia
- Order: Squamata
- Suborder: Iguania
- Family: Iguanidae
- Genus: Brachylophus
- Species: B. bulabula

Binomial name
- Brachylophus bulabula Keogh, Edwards, Fisher, & Harlow, 2008
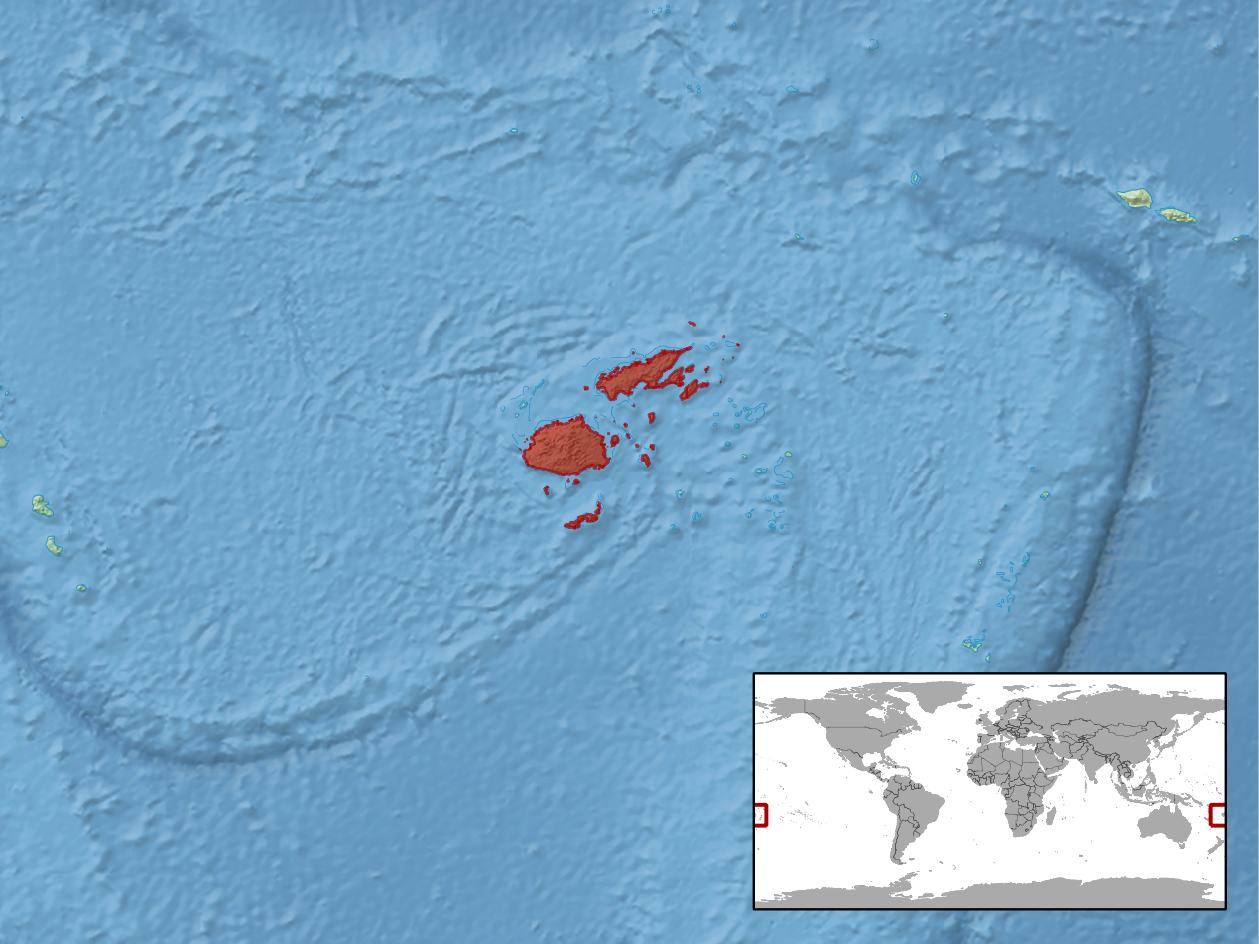

= Brachylophus bulabula =

Species of lizard

Brachylophus bulabula, commonly known as the Central Fijian banded iguana is a species of iguanid lizard endemic to some of the larger central and northwestern islands of Fiji (Ovalau, Kadavu and Viti Levu), where it occurs in Fijian wet forest. It was described by a team led by a scientist from the Australian National University in 2008. It is one of the few species of iguana found outside of the New World and one of the most geographically isolated members of the family Iguanidae. Initially also reported from Gau Island, in 2017 this population was described as a separate species, B. gau. They can grow up to 2 feet long and have an average lifespan of 10-15 years. However, there have been some captive Fiji banded iguanas that have lived as long as 25 years. Fijian banded iguana typically are found in tropical wet islands that are typically 650-1700 feet above sea level. They also like to bask in temperatures ranging from 75–95 °F (24–35 °C). The areas that are most suitable for Fiji banded iguanas are Viti Levu, Vanua Levu, Ovalau, Viwa, and Kadavu. Males are typically green with blue stripes and the females are green with white stripes.

== Taxonomy and etymology ==
The generic name, Brachylophus, is derived from two Greek words: brachys (βραχυς) meaning "short" and lophos (λοφος) meaning "crest" or "plume", denoting the short spiny crests along the back of this species. The specific name, bulabula, is a doubling of the Fijian word for "hello": bula.

The species is closely related to the Fiji crested iguana. This species was described after a mitochondrial DNA analysis of 61 iguanas from 13 islands showed that B. bulabula was genetically and physically different from the two other species.

All species in this genus are thought to have evolved from ancestors that rafted 9,000 km (5,600 mi) west across the Pacific Ocean from the Americas, where their closest relatives are found. It has also been suggested that the genus evolved from iguanas that crossed, in part over dry land bridges, to Fiji from Southeast Asia.

== Reproduction ==
Fiji banded Iguanas reach reproductive maturity around 3 or 4 years old. To attract a mate, male Fiji banded iguanas will often times stick out their tongues and flick them repeatedly. They also will bob their heads in a rhythmic way to attract mates. Females will typically lay a clutch of 5–7 eggs, and those eggs incubate for 7–9 months. One major complication that has impacted the reproductions of Fijian banded iguanas is yolk coelomitis. Yolk coelomitis is a condition in most reptiles that occurs as a result of pre-ovulatory follicular stasis. The yolk and other nutrients of the body are not well absorbed and as a result the yolk never develops a membrane. The yolk keeps growing and breaks eventually. When it breaks, the materials from the yolk cause an infection in the coelomic cavity called Yolk Peritonitis.

== Diet ==
Fiji iguanas are herbivorous; they feed on the leaves, fruit, and flowers of trees and shrubs, particularly hibiscus flowers of the Vau tree (Hibiscus tiliaceus) and fruit such as banana and papaya. When certain fruits are not as abundant, Fiji banded iguanas may also forage for leaves and other native plant species. Hatchlings may feed on insects; however, adults usually will not.

== Additional reading ==
- Jones, Oliver (2021-08-09). "Fiji Banded Iguana: Care Sheet, Lifespan & More (With Pictures)". Pet Keen.
- Stacy, Brian A.; Howard, Lauren; Kinkaid, John; Vidal, Justin D.; Papendick, Rebecca (2008). "Yolk Coelomitis in Fiji Island Banded Iguanas (Brachylophus fasciatus)". Journal of Zoo and Wildlife Medicine. 39 (2). American Association of Zoo Veterinarians: 161–169. doi:10.1638/2007-0047r1.1. ISSN 1042-7260.
- Gibbons, John R. H. (1981-07-31). "The Biogeography of Brachylophus (Iguanidae) including the Description of a New Species, B. vitiensis, from Fiji". Journal of Herpetology. 15 (3). JSTOR: 255. doi:10.2307/1563429. ISSN 0022-1511.
