= Moggridgea rupicoloides =

Scientific classification
- Kingdom: Animalia
- Phylum: Arthropoda
- Subphylum: Chelicerata
- Class: Arachnida
- Order: Araneae
- Infraorder: Mygalomorphae
- Family: Migidae
- Genus: Moggridgea
- Species: M. rupicoloides

Binomial name
- Moggridgea rupicoloides Hewitt, 1914

Species of spider

Moggridgea rupicoloides is a species of spider in the family Migidae. It is endemic to the Eastern Cape province of South Africa.

== Distribution ==
Moggridgea rupicoloides is known from several localities in the Eastern Cape, including Grahamstown, Somerset East (Craigie Burn), Uitenhage, Redhouse, and Addo Elephant National Park.

== Habitat ==
The species occurs at altitudes ranging from 5 to 737 m above sea level.

== Description ==
Moggridgea rupicoloides is known only from adult females: it was discovered by Hewitt in 1914, while Griswold in 1987 refined the original description by redescribing, as well as illustrating this species.

The sampled females conform to the characteristics of their genus, Moggridgea, as well as the family Migidae: an oval abdomen, a caraspace with a recurved fovea and a relatively glabrous cephalic region, cuspules present on the labium and pedipalpal coxa, and the posterior lateral spinnerets three-segmented with a domed apical segment. These somatic characteristics and the trichobothrial/spinneret details were used to determine this species’ classification under the genus Moggridgea and are discussed and illustrated in Griswold (1987) and are summarized in the South African National Survey of Arachnida (SANSA) Migidae guide.

Griswold (1987) provides line drawings and plates of the female habitus, caraspace, and spermathecae, which remain the principal diagnostic illustrations for the species; because males have not been collected, characters based on male palpal morphology are unavailable and identification relies on female somatic characters and spermathecal structure.

Collection notes associated with the type material and later records indicate that adult females were obtained from nests under rocks and large stones (rupicolous trapdoor nests) and have been collected in April and in September–October; these ecological/collection data are often cited alongside the morphological description because they help locate and recognize specimens in the field.

== Ecology ==
Moggridgea rupicoloides is a rupicolous trapdoor species. The type series was collected from nests found under the shelter of rocks and large stones. Adult females were collected in April and September to October.

== Conservation ==
Moggridgea rupicoloides is listed as Data Deficient due to taxonomic reasons. The male remains unknown, and additional sampling is needed to determine the species' current range. The species is protected in Addo Elephant National Park.

== Taxonomy ==
The species was originally described by John Hewitt in 1914 from Grahamstown and later revised by Charles E. Griswold in 1987.
