= Moggridgea paucispina =

Wonderboompoort Rock Moggridgea Trapdoor Spider

Conservation status
- Least Concern (SANBI Red List)

Scientific classification
- Kingdom: Animalia
- Phylum: Arthropoda
- Subphylum: Chelicerata
- Class: Arachnida
- Order: Araneae
- Infraorder: Mygalomorphae
- Family: Migidae
- Genus: Moggridgea
- Species: M. paucispina

Binomial name
- Moggridgea paucispina Hewitt, 1916

Species of spider

Moggridgea paucispina is a species of spider in the family Migidae. It is endemic to South Africa and is commonly known as the Wonderboompoort Rock Moggridgea trapdoor spider.

== Distribution ==
Moggridgea paucispina has been recorded from four provinces in South Africa: Gauteng (Pretoria/Tshwane), Limpopo (Leydsdorp), North West (Rustenburg, Silkaatsnek), and Mpumalanga (Barberton).

== Habitat ==
The species inhabits the Grassland and Savanna biomes at altitudes ranging from 628 to 1,357 m above sea level.

== Lifestyle ==
It is an arboreal trapdoor spider, with one specimen collected from a nest situated in a corner of an overhanging rock. Adult females were collected from April to May.

== Description ==
Moggridgea paucispina is known from both sexes.

== Conservation ==
Moggridgea paucispina is listed as Least Concern by the South African National Biodiversity Institute. All specimens were collected prior to 1916, but given its wide historic range, the species is suspected to still be widespread. Additional sampling is needed to determine the species' present range.

== Taxonomy ==
The species was originally described by John Hewitt in 1916 from Wonderboompoort, Pretoria, and later revised by Charles E. Griswold in 1987. It is one of the few Moggridgea species known from both sexes.
