= Moggridgea ampullata =

Scientific classification
- Kingdom: Animalia
- Phylum: Arthropoda
- Subphylum: Chelicerata
- Class: Arachnida
- Order: Araneae
- Infraorder: Mygalomorphae
- Family: Migidae
- Genus: Moggridgea
- Species: M. ampullata

Binomial name
- Moggridgea ampullata Griswold, 1987

Species of spider

Moggridgea ampullata is a species of spider in the family Migidae. It is endemic to the Western Cape province of South Africa.

== Distribution ==
Moggridgea ampullata is known only from its type locality at Piketberg in the Western Cape province, South Africa.

== Habitat ==
The species inhabits the Fynbos biome at an altitude of 222 m above sea level.

== Description ==
Moggridgea ampullata is known only from the female. The species belongs to the genus Moggridgea, which are medium-sized trapdoor spiders measuring 5-25 mm in length and are strongly sexually dimorphic.

== Conservation ==
Moggridgea ampullata is listed as Data Deficient due to taxonomic reasons. The species is known only from the type locality, and the male remains unknown. The species may be impacted by crop farming on the Piketberg mountains. Additional sampling is needed to determine the species' range and collect male specimens.

== Taxonomy ==
The species was described by Charles E. Griswold in 1987 and revised in his comprehensive treatment of the genus Moggridgea.
