= Moggridgea pymi =

Pym's Tree Trapdoor Spider

Conservation status
- Least Concern (SANBI Red List)

Scientific classification
- Kingdom: Animalia
- Phylum: Arthropoda
- Subphylum: Chelicerata
- Class: Arachnida
- Order: Araneae
- Infraorder: Mygalomorphae
- Family: Migidae
- Genus: Moggridgea
- Species: M. pymi

Binomial name
- Moggridgea pymi Hewitt, 1914

Synonyms
- Moggridgea chirindaensis Benoit, 1962

Species of spider

Moggridgea pymi is a species of spider in the family Migidae. It occurs in Zimbabwe and South Africa and is commonly known as Pym's tree trapdoor spider.

== Distribution ==
Moggridgea pymi occurs in Zimbabwe and in the Limpopo province of South Africa, where it is known from Wylie's Poort and Klein Kariba.

== Habitat ==
The species inhabits the Savanna biome at altitudes ranging from 1,052 to 1,429 m above sea level. One specimen was collected from a nest at the foot of a baobab tree.

== Description ==
Moggridgea pymi is known only from the female.

== Conservation ==
Moggridgea pymi is listed as Least Concern by the South African National Biodiversity Institute. Although known only from females and additional sampling is needed to determine the species' range more accurately within South Africa, it also occurs in Zimbabwe and there is extensive natural habitat within its range.

== Taxonomy ==
The species was originally described by John Hewitt in 1914 from Zimbabwe. Charles E. Griswold's 1987 revision synonymized Moggridgea chirindaensis Benoit, 1962 with this species.
