= Moggridgea microps =

Malelane Moggridgea Trapdoor Spider

Conservation status
- Least Concern (SANBI Red List)

Scientific classification
- Kingdom: Animalia
- Phylum: Arthropoda
- Subphylum: Chelicerata
- Class: Arachnida
- Order: Araneae
- Infraorder: Mygalomorphae
- Family: Migidae
- Genus: Moggridgea
- Species: M. microps

Binomial name
- Moggridgea microps Hewitt, 1915

Species of spider

Moggridgea microps is a species of spider in the family Migidae. It occurs in South Africa and Eswatini and is commonly known as the Malelane Moggridgea trapdoor spider.

== Etymology ==
The specific name is Latin for "small-eyed".

== Distribution ==
Moggridgea microps has a wide distribution across three South African provinces. It occurs in the Eastern Cape (East London, Port St. Johns), KwaZulu-Natal (Durban, Eshowe, Port Shepstone, iSimangaliso Wetland Park), and Mpumalanga (Barberton, Malelane, Mariepskop). The species is also found in Eswatini.

== Habitat ==
The species inhabits multiple biomes including Grassland, Forest, Savanna, and Indian Ocean Coastal Belt biomes at altitudes ranging from 5 to 1,328 m above sea level.

== Lifestyle ==
It is an arboreal trapdoor spider with adult females collected in February, March, May, June, and November.

== Description ==
Moggridgea microps is known only from the female.

== Conservation ==
Moggridgea microps is listed as Least Concern by the South African National Biodiversity Institute. Although presently known only from females, it has a wide geographical range extending into Eswatini. It is protected in the iSimangaliso Wetland Park, but additional sampling is needed to collect male specimens.

== Taxonomy ==
The species was originally described by John Hewitt in 1915 from Malelane in Mpumalanga and later revised by species:Charles E. Griswold in 1987.
