= Moggridgea rupicola =

Scientific classification
- Kingdom: Animalia
- Phylum: Arthropoda
- Subphylum: Chelicerata
- Class: Arachnida
- Order: Araneae
- Infraorder: Mygalomorphae
- Family: Migidae
- Genus: Moggridgea
- Species: M. rupicola

Binomial name
- Moggridgea rupicola Hewitt, 1913

Species of spider

Moggridgea rupicola is a species of spider in the family Migidae. It is endemic to South Africa.

== Etymology ==
The specific name is from Latin, meaning "cliff-dwelling".

== Distribution ==
Moggridgea rupicola has been recorded from two provinces in South Africa. In the Eastern Cape, it occurs at Alicedale, Dassie Klip on the Bushman's River, Grahamstown (Coldspring and Howiesons Poort). It also occurs at Avontuur in the Western Cape.

== Habitat ==
The species inhabits altitudes ranging from 283 to 882 m above sea level.

== Description ==
Moggridgea rupicola is known from both sexes.

== Ecology ==
Moggridgea rupicola is a rupicolous trapdoor spider. The nests are formed in rock crevices or attached to the underside of overhanging ledges, positioned horizontally, strengthened and camouflaged with earth, widened away from the door, and furnished with a thin, wafer-like, nearly circular door. Males were collected from these characteristic nests in March-April.

== Conservation ==
Moggridgea rupicola is listed as Data Deficient. All records are historic, made between 1913 and 1935. Additional sampling is needed to determine the species' present range.

== Taxonomy ==
The species was originally described by John Hewitt in 1913 and later revised by Charles E. Griswold in 1987. It is one of the few Moggridgea species known from both sexes.
