= Moggridgea quercina =

Cape Town Moggridgea Trapdoor Spider

Conservation status
- Endangered (SANBI Red List)

Scientific classification
- Kingdom: Animalia
- Phylum: Arthropoda
- Subphylum: Chelicerata
- Class: Arachnida
- Order: Araneae
- Infraorder: Mygalomorphae
- Family: Migidae
- Genus: Moggridgea
- Species: M. quercina

Binomial name
- Moggridgea quercina Simon, 1903

Synonyms
- Caedmon thoracica O. Pickard-Cambridge, 1904; Caedmon congener O. Pickard-Cambridge, 1904; Caedmon dubia O. Pickard-Cambridge, 1904

Species of spider

Moggridgea quercina is a species of spider in the family Migidae. It is endemic to the Western Cape province of South Africa and is commonly known as the Cape Town Moggridgea trapdoor spider.

== Etymology ==
The specific name derives from Latin quercus "oak", due to the species' association with oak trees.

== Distribution ==
Moggridgea quercina occurs in seven historic locations between the Cape Peninsula and Franschhoek, including Cape Town, Muizenberg, Simonstown, Table Mountain National Park, and Kirstenbosch National Botanical Garden.

== Habitat ==
The species inhabits the Fynbos biome at altitudes ranging from 6 to 300 m above sea level.

== Description ==
Moggridgea quercina is known from both sexes.

== Ecology ==
Moggridgea quercina constructs both arboreal and rupicolous nests. The species is commonly found on the bark of oak trees (Quercus pedunculata), where the nests have a thin but rigid lid. Other specimens were found in oval nests beneath stones with a thin lid, camouflaged with grains of earth and sand. Females were collected in March and June.

== Conservation ==
Moggridgea quercina is listed as Endangered under criterion B by SANBI. Most records are historic and much of the species' habitat has been lost to urban and agricultural development. The species is currently extant at fewer than five locations and receives some protection from Table Mountain National Park. Ongoing habitat loss due to urban development and agriculture continues to threaten the species.

== Taxonomy ==
The species was originally described by Eugène Simon in 1903 from Cape Town. Charles E. Griswold's 1987 revision transferred the species from Caedmon (= Poecilomigas) and synonymized several species including Poecilomigas congener, P. dubius, and P. thoracicus.
