= Moggridgea breyeri =

Scientific classification
- Kingdom: Animalia
- Phylum: Arthropoda
- Subphylum: Chelicerata
- Class: Arachnida
- Order: Araneae
- Infraorder: Mygalomorphae
- Family: Migidae
- Genus: Moggridgea
- Species: M. breyeri

Binomial name
- Moggridgea breyeri Hewitt, 1915

Species of spider

Moggridgea breyeri is a species of spider in the family Migidae. It is endemic to Limpopo province of South Africa.

== Distribution ==
Moggridgea breyeri is known from localities around Gravelotte and Mamoranga in Limpopo province, including areas near the Letaba River.

== Habitat ==
The species inhabits the Savanna biome at altitudes ranging from 531 to 589 m above sea level.

== Description ==
Moggridgea breyeri is known only from the female.

== Ecology ==
Like other members of the genus, Moggridgea breyeri are trapdoor spiders that close the entrance to their retreat with a hinged trapdoor. Adult females were collected in January, June, and July, indicating an extended activity period.

== Conservation ==
Moggridgea breyeri is listed as Data Deficient due to taxonomic reasons. The species was last sampled prior to 1917, and the male remains unknown. Additional sampling is needed to determine the species' current range and collect male specimens.

== Taxonomy ==
The species was originally described by John Hewitt in 1915 and later revised by Griswold in 1987.
