= Moggridgea teresae =

Conservation status
- Least Concern (IUCN 3.1)

Scientific classification
- Kingdom: Animalia
- Phylum: Arthropoda
- Subphylum: Chelicerata
- Class: Arachnida
- Order: Araneae
- Infraorder: Mygalomorphae
- Family: Migidae
- Genus: Moggridgea
- Species: M. teresae

Binomial name
- Moggridgea teresae Griswold, 1987

Species of spider

Moggridgea teresae is a species of spider in the family Migidae. It is endemic to the Western Cape province of South Africa and is commonly known as Teresa's tree trapdoor spider.

== Distribution ==
Moggridgea teresae is known from several localities on Table Mountain, including Table Mountain National Park (Fernwood Nature Reserve, Skeleton Gorge, Newlands Forest, Cecilia Spilhaus, Bat Cave) and Kirstenbosch National Botanical Garden.

== Habitat ==
The species occurs at altitudes ranging from 9 to 991 m above sea level.

== Description ==
Moggridgea teresae is known from both sexes.

== Ecology ==
Moggridgea teresae constructs arboreal oval to pear-shaped nests with a single, oval door in crevices on the bark of fallen logs. The holotype female was collected from a nest on the trunk of a fallen Virgilia oroboides tree. The nests are thoroughly camouflaged with bark and soil.

== Conservation ==
Moggridgea teresae is listed as Rare due to its small restricted distribution range. The species is threatened by urbanization around Cape Town, although it is protected in Table Mountain National Park.

== Taxonomy ==
The species was described by Charles E. Griswold in 1987 from Skeleton Gorge forest at Kirstenbosch National Botanical Garden. It is one of the few Moggridgea species known from both sexes.
