= Moggridgea dyeri =

Dyer's Moggridgea Trapdoor Spider

Conservation status
- Least Concern (SANBI Red List)

Scientific classification
- Kingdom: Animalia
- Phylum: Arthropoda
- Subphylum: Chelicerata
- Class: Arachnida
- Order: Araneae
- Infraorder: Mygalomorphae
- Family: Migidae
- Genus: Moggridgea
- Species: M. dyeri

Binomial name
- Moggridgea dyeri O. Pickard-Cambridge, 1875

Species of spider

Moggridgea dyeri is a species of spider in the family Migidae. It is endemic to South Africa and is commonly known as Dyer's Moggridgea trapdoor spider. It is the type species of the genus Moggridgea.

== Distribution ==
Moggridgea dyeri is known from two provinces in South Africa. It occurs in the Eastern Cape from multiple localities including Grahamstown, Port Elizabeth, and Somerset East, and in KwaZulu-Natal from Harding.

== Habitat ==
The species inhabits multiple biomes including the Nama Karoo, Fynbos, Savanna, and Thicket biomes at altitudes ranging from 7 to 737 m above sea level. It is an arboreal, nest-building trapdoor species with adult females collected during seven months of the year, indicating an extended activity period.

== Description ==
Moggridgea dyeri is known only from the female.

== Conservation ==
Moggridgea dyeri is listed as Least Concern by SANBI. Despite having a relatively restricted range, the species is suspected to be under-collected, with vast expanses of natural habitat within its range and no significant threats. It is protected in the Fort Brown Kudu Reserve.

== Taxonomy ==
Moggridgea dyeri was originally described by O. Pickard-Cambridge in 1875 from Uitenhage in the Eastern Cape and serves as the type species for the genus Moggridgea. The species was later revised by Griswold in 1987.
