= Mogridge =

Mogridge is a surname. Notable people with the name include:

- Alan Mogridge (born 1963), British speedway rider
- E. S. Mogridge (died 1903), British botanical model-maker
- George Mogridge (1889–1962), American baseball player
- George Mogridge (writer) (1787–1854), British writer mainly under the pseudonym "Old Humphrey"
- Jack Mogridge (1903–1978), Australian rugby player
- Martin J. H. Mogridge (1940–2000), British transport researcher
- William Mogridge, British coxswain from Devon

== See also ==
- Moggridge (surname)
