= Moggridgea pseudocrudeni =

Scientific classification
- Kingdom: Animalia
- Phylum: Arthropoda
- Subphylum: Chelicerata
- Class: Arachnida
- Order: Araneae
- Infraorder: Mygalomorphae
- Family: Migidae
- Genus: Moggridgea
- Species: M. pseudocrudeni

Binomial name
- Moggridgea pseudocrudeni Hewitt, 1919

Species of spider

Moggridgea pseudocrudeni is a species of spider in the family Migidae. It is endemic to South Africa.

== Distribution ==
Moggridgea pseudocrudeni has been recorded from two provinces in South Africa. In the Eastern Cape, it occurs at Alicedale, Committees, Dassie Klip on the Bushman's River, and Hell's Poort. It also occurs at Wydgeleë in the Western Cape.

== Habitat ==
The species inhabits the Thicket and Fynbos biomes at altitudes ranging from 95 to 531 m above sea level.

== Description ==
Moggridgea pseudocrudeni is known from both sexes.

== Ecology ==
Moggridgea pseudocrudeni is a rupicolous trapdoor species that occupies and excavates small cylindrical cavities in earth or mud. Males were collected in February and females in February, March, and July.

== Conservation ==
Moggridgea pseudocrudeni is listed as Data Deficient. All specimens were collected between 1916 and 1935, and no recent records exist. Additional sampling is needed to determine the species' present range.

== Taxonomy ==
The species was originally described by John Hewitt in 1919 from Alicedale in the Eastern Cape and later revised by Charles E. Griswold in 1987.
