= Moggridgea leipoldti =

Scientific classification
- Kingdom: Animalia
- Phylum: Arthropoda
- Subphylum: Chelicerata
- Class: Arachnida
- Order: Araneae
- Infraorder: Mygalomorphae
- Family: Migidae
- Genus: Moggridgea
- Species: M. leipoldti

Binomial name
- Moggridgea leipoldti Purcell, 1903

Species of spider

Moggridgea leipoldti is a species of spider in the family Migidae. It is endemic to the Western Cape province of South Africa.

== Etymology ==
The species is possibly named after South African poet C. Louis Leipoldt.

== Distribution ==
Moggridgea leipoldti is known only from its type locality at Clanwilliam in the Western Cape province, South Africa.

== Habitat ==
The species inhabits the Fynbos biome at an altitude of 78 m above sea level.

== Description ==
Moggridgea leipoldti is known only from the female. Like other members of the genus, it is a trapdoor spider.

== Conservation ==
Moggridgea leipoldti is listed as Data Deficient due to taxonomic reasons. The species is known only from the type locality, and the male remains unknown. Additional sampling is needed to determine the species' range and collect male specimens.

== Taxonomy ==
The species was originally described by Henry Purcell in 1903 and later revised by Charles E. Griswold in 1987.
