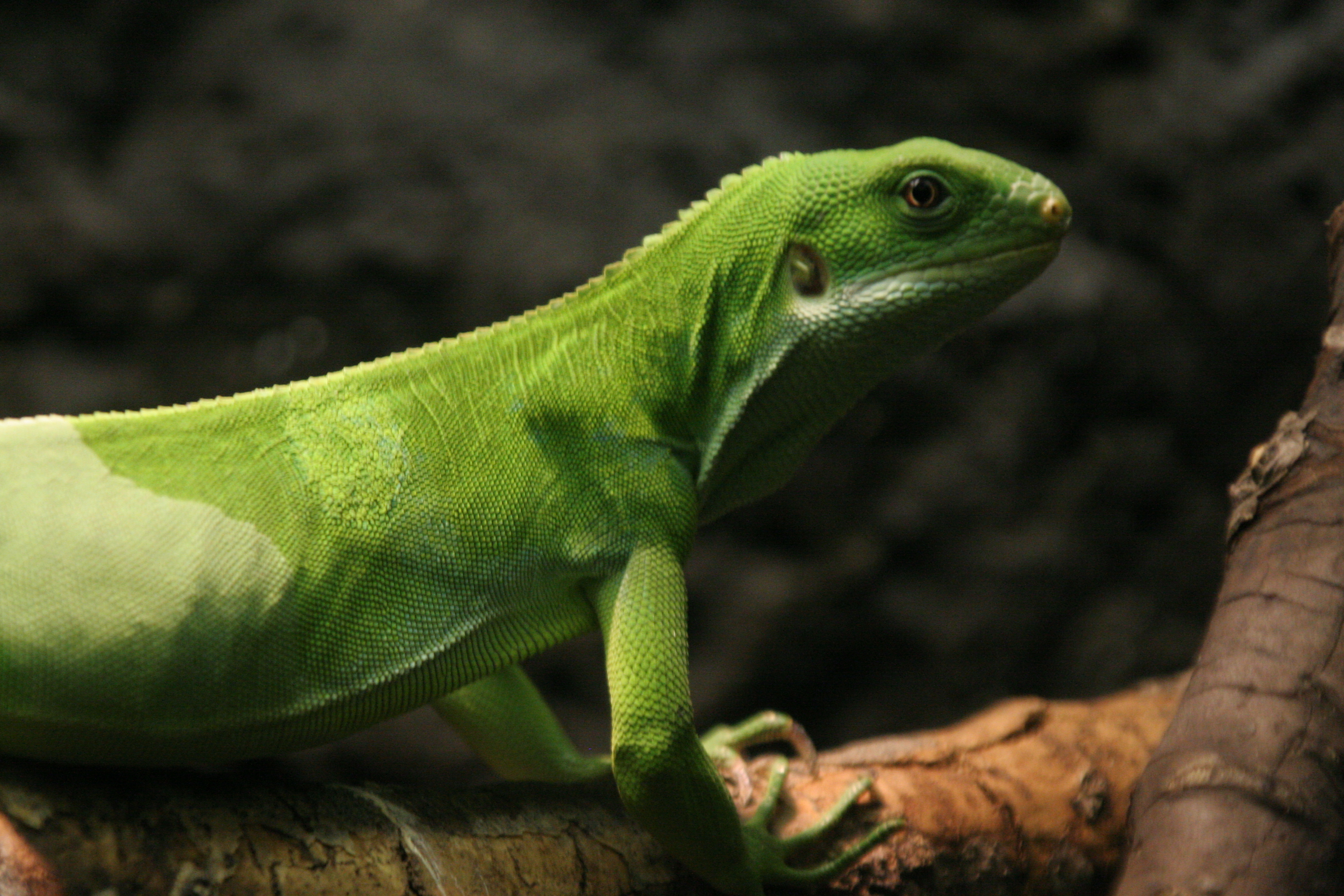
- Fiji banded iguana (Brachylophus bulabula) in captivity

Scientific classification
- Kingdom: Animalia
- Phylum: Chordata
- Class: Reptilia
- Order: Squamata
- Suborder: Iguania
- Family: Iguanidae
- Genus: Brachylophus; Cuvier, 1829

Type species
- Brachylophus fasciatus Cuvier, 1829

Species
- Brachylophus bulabula Brachylophus fasciatus Brachylophus gau Brachylophus vitiensis †Brachylophus gibbonsi
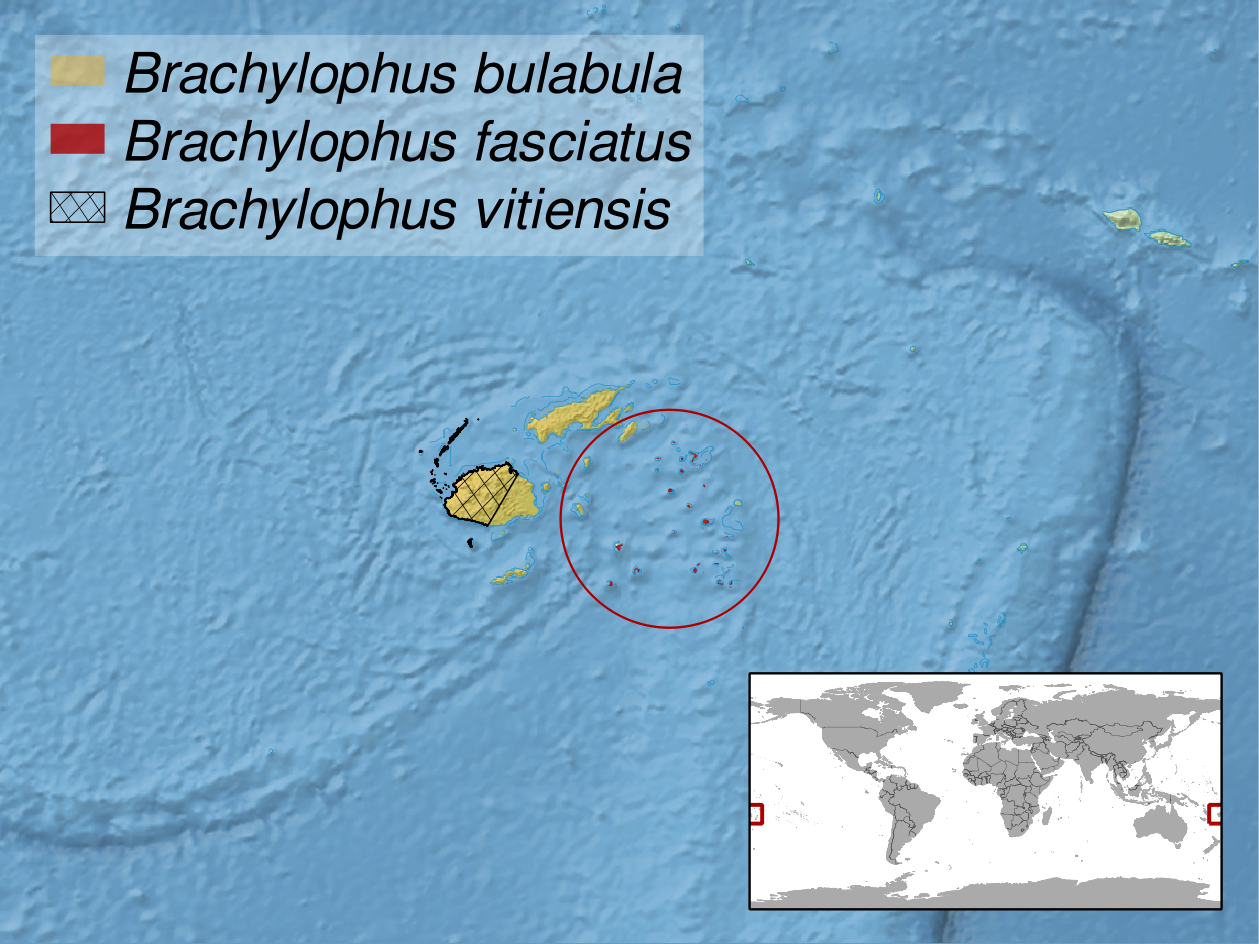

= Brachylophus =

Genus of lizards

The genus Brachylophus consists of four extant iguanid species native to the islands of Fiji and a giant extinct species from Tonga in the South West Pacific. One of the extant species, B. fasciatus, is also present on Tonga, where it has apparently been introduced by humans.

== Etymology and taxonomy ==
The name, Brachylophus, is derived from two Greek words: brachys (βραχύς) meaning "short" and lophos (λόφος) meaning "crest" or "plume", denoting the short spiny crests found along the backs of these species.

Brachylophus species are the most geographically isolated iguanas in the world. Their closest extant relatives (the genera Amblyrhynchus, Conolophus, Ctenosaura, Cyclura, Iguana and Sauromalus) are present in primarily tropical regions of the Americas and islands in the Galápagos and Lesser and Greater Antilles. Several of these genera are adapted to xeric biomes. Phylogenetic evidence supports the Brachylophus lineage to have diverged from the rest of Iguanidae in the latest Eocene, about 35 million years ago. They are the second most basal extant genus in the family, with only Dipsosaurus diverging earlier. The location of members of Brachylophus, so distant from all other known extant or extinct iguanids, has long presented a biogeographical enigma.

One hypothesis to account for this biogeographical puzzle, based in part on an estimated divergence date of 50 million years ago (although more recent studies have revised this to about 35 million years ago), is that these species are the descendants of a more widespread but now extinct lineage of Old World iguanids that migrated overland from the New World to Asia or Australia, and then dispersed by some combination of continental drift, rafting and/or land bridges to their present remote location. However, no other fossil or extant species of this putative lineage have been found to date in Southeast Asia, Australasia or the western Pacific outside of Fiji and Tonga.

A secondary hypothesis, and the more widely accepted one, is that these species evolved from New World iguanas that rafted 10,000 km (6,200 mi) west across the Pacific Ocean with the aid of the South Equatorial Current. While a rafting voyage of four months or more might seem implausible, the ancestors of Brachylophus may have been preadapted for such a journey by having water requirements that can be satisfied by food alone, as well as comparatively long egg incubation periods.

=== Extant species ===
The extant species are:

| Image | Scientific name | Common name | Distribution |
|---|---|---|---|
| | Brachylophus bulabula | Central Fijian banded iguana | Northwestern islands of Fiji (Ovalau, Kadavu and Viti Levu) |
| | Brachylophus fasciatus | Lau banded iguana | Eastern Fijian islands |
| | Brachylophus gau | Gau iguana | Gau island |
| | Brachylophus vitiensis | Fiji crested iguana | Northwestern islands of the Fijiian archipelago |

Historically, only the first two were recognized, but B. bulabula ("bulabula" is the Fijian word for "healthy" or "flourishing") was described in the central regions of Fiji by a team led by a scientist from the Australian National University in 2008. Detailed genetic and morphological analyses were made to conclude that B. bulabula represents a third species. In 2017, B. gau was described as a new species from Gau Island.

A giant Tongan species, Brachylophus gibbonsi, similar in size and build to an iguana of the genus Cyclura once existed on Lifuka, islands in the Ha‘apai group and Tongatapu but became extinct in prehistoric times due to predation by humans and their domestic animals. An even larger extinct iguana of the separate genus Lapitiguana was formerly present on Fiji.
