= Moggridgea peringueyi =

Peringuey's Moggridgea Trapdoor Spider

Conservation status
- Least Concern (SANBI Red List)

Scientific classification
- Kingdom: Animalia
- Phylum: Arthropoda
- Subphylum: Chelicerata
- Class: Arachnida
- Order: Araneae
- Infraorder: Mygalomorphae
- Family: Migidae
- Genus: Moggridgea
- Species: M. peringueyi

Binomial name
- Moggridgea peringueyi Simon, 1903

Synonyms
- Moggridgea coegensis Purcell, 1903; Moggridgea nigra Purcell, 1904; Moggridgea latus Tucker, 1917

Species of spider

Moggridgea peringueyi is a species of spider in the family Migidae. It is endemic to South Africa and is commonly known as Peringuey's Moggridgea trapdoor spider.

== Etymology ==
The species is named after Louis Albert Péringuey, a French-born South African entomologist who made significant contributions to the study of southern African insects.

== Distribution ==
Moggridgea peringueyi has a wide distribution across four South African provinces: Eastern Cape, Free State, KwaZulu-Natal, Northern Cape, and Western Cape. Notable locations include the Cederberg Wilderness Area, De Hoop Nature Reserve, and Karoo National Park.

== Habitat ==
The species inhabits multiple biomes including Grassland, Thicket, and Fynbos biomes at altitudes ranging from 7 to 1,463 m above sea level.

== Description ==
Moggridgea peringueyi is known from both sexes. It is a terrestrial trapdoor species that constructs cylindrical burrows closed with thick, D-shaped lids that overlap the mouth.

== Ecology ==
Burrows are typically found in open veld, but the species has also been collected under bark of Eucalyptus trees. Adult females were collected in February, May, and November, while males were collected in April, July, and October.

== Conservation ==
Moggridgea peringueyi is listed as Least Concern by the South African National Biodiversity Institute due to its wide range. The species is protected in eight protected areas including the Cederberg Wilderness Area, De Hoop Nature Reserve, Tswalu Kalahari Reserve, and Karoo National Park.

== Taxonomy ==
The species was originally described by Eugène Simon in 1903 from Matjiesfontein in the Western Cape. Charles E. Griswold's 1987 revision synonymized several species with M. peringueyi, including M. coegensis, M. lata, and M. nigra.
