= Moggridgea intermedia =

Conservation status
- Least Concern (IUCN 3.1)

Scientific classification
- Kingdom: Animalia
- Phylum: Arthropoda
- Subphylum: Chelicerata
- Class: Arachnida
- Order: Araneae
- Infraorder: Mygalomorphae
- Family: Migidae
- Genus: Moggridgea
- Species: M. intermedia

Binomial name
- Moggridgea intermedia Hewitt, 1913

Species of spider

Moggridgea intermedia is a species of spider in the family Migidae. It is endemic to the Western Cape province of South Africa and is commonly known as the Knysna Moggridgea trapdoor spider.

It is assumed that the Australian outlier species Moggridgea rainbowi is most closely related to this species.

== Distribution ==
Moggridgea intermedia is known only from three localities in the Western Cape around Knysna, including Diepwalle Forest Station, Harkerville State Forest Krantzhoek, and Knysna State Forest.

== Habitat ==
The species inhabits the Forest biome at altitudes ranging from 45 to 425 m above sea level. It constructs nests both arboreally on tree trunks and in rocky environments.

== Description ==
Moggridgea intermedia is known from both sexes. Females construct oval, silken nests with a single, wafer door. The nests are built on tree trunks in a vertical orientation or in cracks and crevices in rocky outcrops or stone walls, where they are usually horizontal. Adults were collected in January and May.

== Conservation ==
Moggridgea intermedia is classified as Least Concern by the IUCN. However, it is considered rare due to its small restricted distribution range. It has been recorded from three state forests, which provides some protection for the species.

== Taxonomy ==
The species was originally described by John Hewitt in 1913 and later revised by Charles E. Griswold in 1987. It is one of the few Moggridgea species known from both sexes.
