= Moggridgea albimaculata =

Scientific classification
- Kingdom: Animalia
- Phylum: Arthropoda
- Subphylum: Chelicerata
- Class: Arachnida
- Order: Araneae
- Infraorder: Mygalomorphae
- Family: Migidae
- Genus: Moggridgea
- Species: M. albimaculata

Binomial name
- Moggridgea albimaculata Hewitt, 1925

Species of spider

Moggridgea albimaculata is a species of spider in the family Migidae. It is endemic to South Africa.

== Etymology ==
The specific name is Latin for "white-spotted".

== Distribution ==
Moggridgea albimaculata is known only from its type locality at Sekororo, approximately 35 kilometres (22 mi) south-southwest of Leydsdorp in Limpopo province in northern South Africa.

== Habitat ==
The biome the species was found in is the savanna, at an altitude of 628 metres (2,060 ft) above sea level. It was collected from a nest constructed under bark and closed with a trapdoor.

== Description ==
Moggridgea albimaculata is known only from the female. The species belongs to the genus Moggridgea, which are medium-sized trapdoor spiders measuring 5–25 mm (0.2–1 in) in length. Like other members of the genus, it constructs bag-like retreats rather than typical burrows.

== Ecology ==
The adult female was collected in December. The species constructs trapdoor nests, with the single known specimen having been found in a nest made under bark.

== Conservation ==
Moggridgea albimaculata is listed as data deficient by the International Union for Conservation of Nature (IUCN) for taxonomic reasons. The species is known only from the type locality, and the male remains unknown. Additional sampling is needed to determine the species' range and collect male specimens.
