= Moggridgea mordax =

Scientific classification
- Kingdom: Animalia
- Phylum: Arthropoda
- Subphylum: Chelicerata
- Class: Arachnida
- Order: Araneae
- Infraorder: Mygalomorphae
- Family: Migidae
- Genus: Moggridgea
- Species: M. mordax

Binomial name
- Moggridgea mordax Purcell, 1903

Species of spider

Moggridgea mordax is a species of spider in the family Migidae. It is endemic to the Western Cape province of South Africa.

== Etymology ==
The specific name is Latin for "biting, caustic".

== Distribution ==
Moggridgea mordax is known from two locations in the Western Cape: Montagu (the type locality) and St. Helena Bay.

== Habitat ==
The species inhabits the Fynbos biome at altitudes ranging from 109 to 222 m above sea level.

== Description ==
Moggridgea mordax is known only from the female. It is a terrestrial, burrowing trapdoor spider that constructs cylindrical, inclined, silk-lined burrows. The mouth of the burrow is broadened and larger than the burrow itself. The lid is D-shaped, thick, flat and thin along the margins, and slightly raised above the substrate to resemble a detached piece.

== Ecology ==
Adult females were collected in November and February.

== Conservation ==
Moggridgea mordax is listed as Data Deficient due to taxonomic reasons. Only two locations are known, with the last specimen collected in 1981. The male remains unknown, and additional sampling is needed to determine the species' range.

== Taxonomy ==
The species was originally described by Henry Purcell in 1903 from Montagu and later revised by Charles E. Griswold in 1987.
