= Moggridgea crudeni =

Scientific classification
- Kingdom: Animalia
- Phylum: Arthropoda
- Subphylum: Chelicerata
- Class: Arachnida
- Order: Araneae
- Infraorder: Mygalomorphae
- Family: Migidae
- Genus: Moggridgea
- Species: M. crudeni

Binomial name
- Moggridgea crudeni Hewitt, 1913

Species of spider

Moggridgea crudeni is a species of spider in the family Migidae. It is endemic to the Eastern Cape province of South Africa.

== Distribution ==
Moggridgea crudeni is known from several localities in the Eastern Cape, including Alicedale, Port Alfred, and Woodfields Kranz near Zuurberg.

== Habitat ==
The species inhabits the Nama Karoo biome at altitudes ranging from 59 to 283 m above sea level. It is a rupicolous species, making nests in earth-filled cracks and cavities in rocks.

== Description ==
Moggridgea crudeni is known only from the female. The species constructs distinctive nests in rocky environments, closed with an oval door that has an evenly rounded rim.

== Ecology ==
Moggridgea crudeni is a rupicolous, nest-building trapdoor species. Adult females were collected in June and October.

== Conservation ==
Moggridgea crudeni is listed as Data Deficient due to taxonomic reasons. All specimens were collected between 1913 and 1917, and the male remains unknown. Additional sampling is needed to determine the species' current range and collect male specimens.

== Taxonomy ==
The species was originally described by John Hewitt in 1913 from Alicedale and later revised by Charles E. Griswold in 1987.
