= Moggridgea loistata =

Stellenbosch Moggridgea Trapdoor Spider

Conservation status
- Endangered (SANBI Red List)

Scientific classification
- Kingdom: Animalia
- Phylum: Arthropoda
- Subphylum: Chelicerata
- Class: Arachnida
- Order: Araneae
- Infraorder: Mygalomorphae
- Family: Migidae
- Genus: Moggridgea
- Species: M. loistata

Binomial name
- Moggridgea loistata Griswold, 1987

Species of spider

Moggridgea loistata is a species of spider in the family Migidae. It is endemic to the Western Cape province of South Africa and is commonly known as the Stellenbosch Moggridgea trapdoor spider.

== Distribution ==
Moggridgea loistata is known from three locations in the Western Cape: Stellenbosch, Franschhoek, and Houwhoek.

== Habitat ==
The species inhabits the Fynbos biome at altitudes ranging from 103 to 300 m above sea level. Adult females were collected in July.

== Description ==
Moggridgea loistata is known only from the female.

== Conservation ==
Moggridgea loistata is listed as Endangered under criterion B by the South African National Biodiversity Institute. The species is restricted to lowland Fynbos that is experiencing ongoing habitat loss due to vineyard cultivation and housing development. Only three locations are known, and the male remains unknown. Additional sampling is needed to determine the species' current range.

== Taxonomy ==
The species was described by Charles E. Griswold in 1987 during his revision of the genus Moggridgea.
