= Moggridgea rainbowi =

Scientific classification
- Kingdom: Animalia
- Phylum: Arthropoda
- Subphylum: Chelicerata
- Class: Arachnida
- Order: Araneae
- Infraorder: Mygalomorphae
- Family: Migidae
- Genus: Moggridgea
- Species: M. rainbowi

Binomial name
- Moggridgea rainbowi (Pulleine, 1919)

Synonyms
- Aganippe rainbowi Pulleine, 1919; Blakistonia rainbowi Main, 1985; Moggridgea australis Main, 1991

Species of spider

Moggridgea rainbowi, also called the Australian trapdoor spider, is a small spider endemic to Kangaroo Island in South Australia. The spider was first recorded in 1919.

== Distribution ==
The spider's habitat is in burrows just above the high tide mark. The spider has been identified and studied from two sites on Kangaroo Island; the genomes from the two sites 80 km apart indicate that the groups diverged 1 to 6 million years ago, reflective of juveniles not migrating far from their maternal sites. The most closely related species is considered to be the African M. intermedia.

A study has indicated that M. rainbowi is likely to have reached Australia from Africa between 2 and 16 million years ago. Given that this time is intermediate between the separation of Australia from Gondwana (circa 95 million years ago) and the arrival of humans into Australia, it has been proposed that the spiders may have arrived by oceanic dispersal, such as by rafting vegetation.

== Behaviour ==
The spiders live in short burrows, approximately 6cm deep. Young spiders live with their mothers before building their own burrows nearby.

== 2019-2020 bushfires ==
All known Western River populations were destroyed during the 2019-2020 Australian bushfires, one of which burned a third of Kangaroo Island. Only 5 survivors have since been reported. Later surveys found more individuals across the island, with some of these populations (including a newly-discovered inland population) being stable, but found the Western River populations to still be at critically low levels.
