= Moggridgea terricola =

Stellenbosch Ground Migid Trapdoor Spider

Conservation status
- Vulnerable (SANBI Red List)

Scientific classification
- Kingdom: Animalia
- Phylum: Arthropoda
- Subphylum: Chelicerata
- Class: Arachnida
- Order: Araneae
- Infraorder: Mygalomorphae
- Family: Migidae
- Genus: Moggridgea
- Species: M. terricola

Binomial name
- Moggridgea terricola Simon, 1903

Synonyms
- Caedmon affinis O. Pickard-Cambridge, 1904

Species of spider

Moggridgea terricola is a species of spider in the family Migidae. It is endemic to the Western Cape province of South Africa and is commonly known as the Stellenbosch ground Migid trapdoor spider.

== Distribution ==
Moggridgea terricola has been recorded from several localities in the Western Cape, including George, Stellenbosch, Swellendam, Table Mountain National Park (Cape Point and Signal Hill), Wellington, and Cape Town Oranjesicht.

== Habitat ==
The species inhabits the Fynbos biome at altitudes ranging from 7 to 243 m above sea level.

== Description ==
Moggridgea terricola is known from both sexes.

== Ecology ==
Moggridgea terricola is a terrestrial burrowing trapdoor species. Burrows were found singly on bare flats under the shade of trees and bushes. They also construct burrows in mossy banks.

== Conservation ==
Moggridgea terricola is listed as Vulnerable under criterion B by the South African National Biodiversity Institute. The species is currently known from fewer than 10 locations and is experiencing ongoing habitat loss due to crop cultivation and urban development. Most localities were sampled between 1903 and 1986, and a number may have been lost. The species is protected in Table Mountain National Park.

== Taxonomy ==
The species was originally described by Eugène Simon in 1903 from Stellenbosch. Charles E. Griswold's 1987 revision synonymized Poecilomigas (= Caedmon) affinis with this species.
