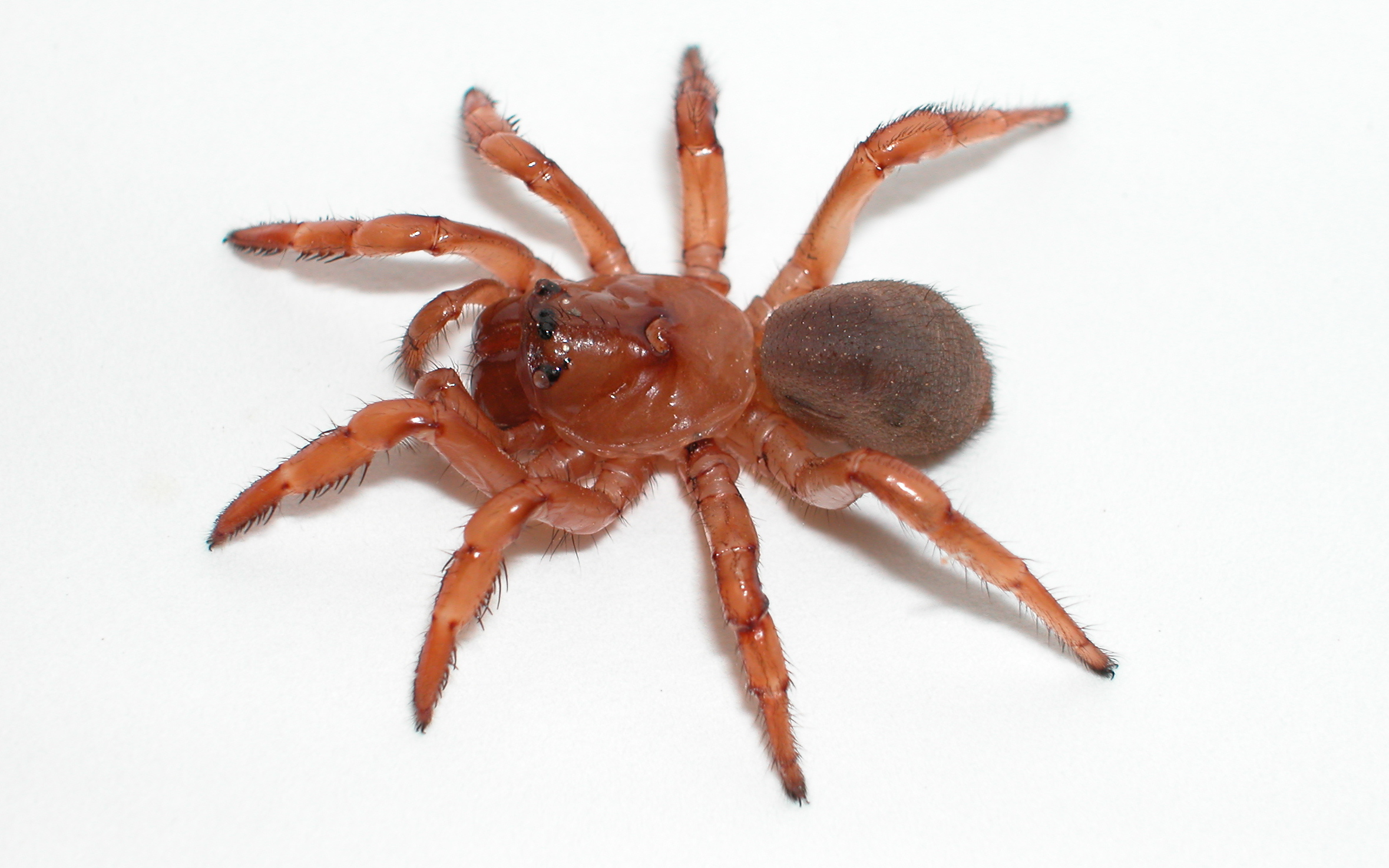
- Moggridgea sp. from South Africa

Scientific classification
- Kingdom: Animalia
- Phylum: Arthropoda
- Subphylum: Chelicerata
- Class: Arachnida
- Order: Araneae
- Infraorder: Mygalomorphae
- Family: Migidae
- Genus: Moggridgea; O. P-Cambridge, 1875

Type species
- Moggridgea dyeri O. P-Cambridge, 1875

Species
- See text

Diversity
- 33 species

= Moggridgea =

Genus of spiders

Moggridgea is a genus of spiders belonging to the tree-dwelling family, Migidae. The genus was first described by Octavius Pickard-Cambridge in 1875 and is named after the naturalist John Traherne Moggridge.

The majority of the species of the genus are found in southern Africa and Socotra, with the outlying species Moggridgea rainbowi endemic to Kangaroo Island in Australia.

== Species ==
As of October 2025, this genus includes 32 species:

- Moggridgea albimaculata Hewitt, 1925 – South Africa
- Moggridgea ampullata Griswold, 1987 – South Africa
- Moggridgea anactenidia Griswold, 1987 – Cameroon
- Moggridgea breyeri Hewitt, 1915 – South Africa
- Moggridgea clypeostriata Benoit, 1962 – DR Congo
- Moggridgea crudeni Hewitt, 1913 – South Africa
- Moggridgea dyeri O. Pickard-Cambridge, 1875 – South Africa (type species)
- Moggridgea eremicola Griswold, 1987 – Namibia
- Moggridgea intermedia Hewitt, 1913 – South Africa
- Moggridgea leipoldti Purcell, 1903 – South Africa
- Moggridgea loistata Griswold, 1987 – South Africa
- Moggridgea microps Hewitt, 1915 – South Africa, Eswatini
- Moggridgea mordax Purcell, 1903 – South Africa
- Moggridgea nesiota Griswold, 1987 – Comoros
- Moggridgea occidua Simon, 1907 – São Tomé and Príncipe
- Moggridgea pallida Hewitt, 1914 – Namibia
- Moggridgea paucispina Hewitt, 1916 – South Africa
- Moggridgea peringueyi Simon, 1903 – South Africa
- Moggridgea pseudocrudeni Hewitt, 1919 – South Africa
- Moggridgea purpurea Lawrence, 1928 – Namibia
- Moggridgea pymi Hewitt, 1914 – Zimbabwe, South Africa
- Moggridgea quercina Simon, 1903 – South Africa
- Moggridgea rainbowi (Pulleine, 1919) – Australia (South Australia)
- Moggridgea rupicola Hewitt, 1913 – South Africa
- Moggridgea rupicoloides Hewitt, 1914 – South Africa
- Moggridgea socotra Griswold, 1987 – Yemen (Socotra)
- Moggridgea tanypalpa Griswold, 1987 – Angola
- Moggridgea teresae Griswold, 1987 – South Africa
- Moggridgea terrestris Hewitt, 1914 – South Africa
- Moggridgea terricola Simon, 1903 – South Africa
- Moggridgea verruculata Griswold, 1987 – Congo
- Moggridgea whytei Pocock, 1897 – Central Africa
