= Moggridgea terrestris =

Scientific classification
- Kingdom: Animalia
- Phylum: Arthropoda
- Subphylum: Chelicerata
- Class: Arachnida
- Order: Araneae
- Infraorder: Mygalomorphae
- Family: Migidae
- Genus: Moggridgea
- Species: M. terrestris

Binomial name
- Moggridgea terrestris Hewitt, 1914

Species of spider

Moggridgea terrestris is a species of spider in the family Migidae. It is endemic to the Eastern Cape province of South Africa.

== Distribution ==
Moggridgea terrestris is known only from its type locality at Alicedale in the Eastern Cape province, South Africa.

== Habitat ==
The species inhabits the Fynbos biome at an altitude of 283 m above sea level.

== Description ==
Moggridgea terrestris is known only from the female.

== Ecology ==
Moggridgea terrestris is a terrestrial, burrowing trapdoor species.

== Conservation ==
Moggridgea terrestris is listed as Data Deficient due to taxonomic reasons. The species is known only from the type locality, and the male remains unknown. Additional sampling is needed to determine the species' range and collect male specimens.

== Taxonomy ==
The species was originally described by John Hewitt in 1914 and later revised by Charles E. Griswold in 1987.
