= John Traherne Moggridge =

British botanist and entomologist

- Born: 8 March 1842; Swansea, Wales
- Died: 24 November 1874 (aged 32); Menton, France
- Education: King's School, Sherborne
- Alma mater: Trinity College, Cambridge
- Scientific career
- Fields: Botany, entomology
- Author abbrev. (botany): Moggr.

John Traherne Moggridge (8 March 1842 – 24 November 1874) was a British botanist, entomologist, and arachnologist. A Fellow of the Linnean Society of London, he was known as a keen naturalist with great observational skills, as well as his paintings and illustrations. He wrote several articles on the fertilisation of plants, and his paintings of plants of southern France appeared in Contributions to the Flora of Mentone. His two volume study, Harvesting Ants and Trap-door Spiders, among other observations, confirmed that harvester ants are present in Europe, and was one of the first comprehensive treatments of the burrowing behaviour of trapdoor spiders. He was a correspondent of Charles Darwin, who cited his work in his books Fertilisation of Orchids and The Descent of Man, and Selection in Relation to Sex.

Moggridge was born in Swansea, Wales to a family already steeped in natural history. His father, Matthew Moggridge, was a naturalist and geologist, a Fellow of the Linnean, Geological and Zoological Societies, while his mother, Fanny Moggridge, was the daughter of Lewis Weston Dillwyn, a naturalist and member of parliament. His father went with him to Menton, France, to collect plants. John's brother Matthew Weston Moggridge (1838–1891) was curate at St John's Church, Leicester (1864–1866), and at Long Ditton, Kingston-on-Thames (1866–1873), and wrote on charitable giving and social improvement.

John attended King's School, Sherborne (now known as Sherborne School) in Dorset and in 1861 enrolled in Trinity College, Cambridge, but health problems interrupted his studies, causing him to relocate to the warmer climate of Menton, France, in the Provence region of southern France.

He died in Menton of tuberculosis in 1874 at the age of 32, following a lengthy period of invalidity. He was posthumously commemorated in the genus name Moggridgea, a group of spiders named by Octavius Pickard-Cambridge, who also named a species of nemesiid spider (Nemesia moggridgii, now N. carminans) after Moggridge.

== Books ==
- Contributions to the Flora of Mentone. London: Lovell Reeve & Co. 1864
- Harvesting Ants and Trap-door Spiders. London: Lovell Reeve & Co. 1873
- Supplement to Harvesting Ants and Trap-door Spiders. London: Lovell Reeve & Co. 1874
- Contributions to the Flora of Mentone and to a Winter Flora of the Riviera, including the coast from Marseilles to Genoa 1874

The standard author abbreviation Moggr. is used to indicate this person as the author when citing a botanical name.

== Illustrations ==
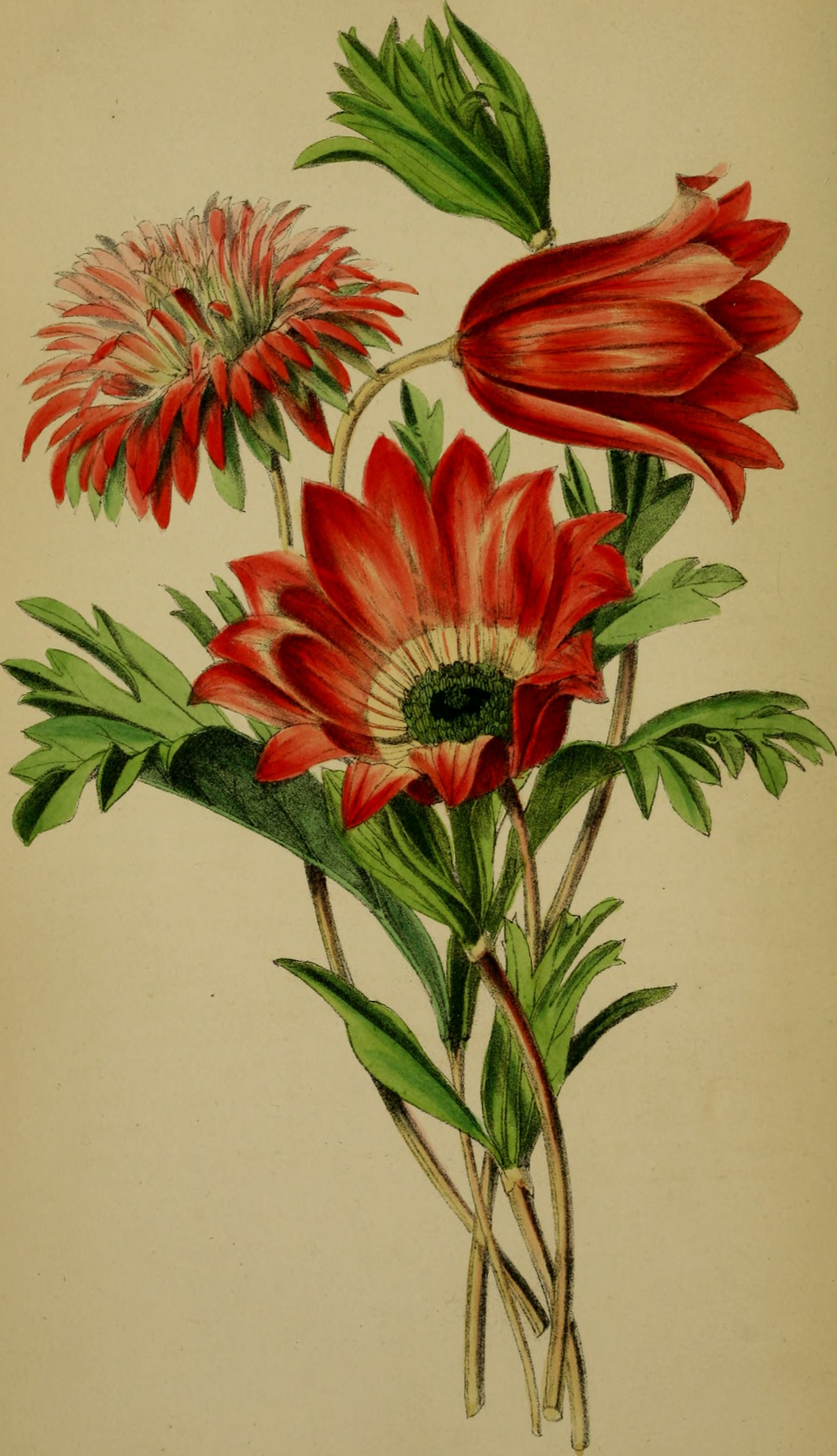
Anemone paviflora

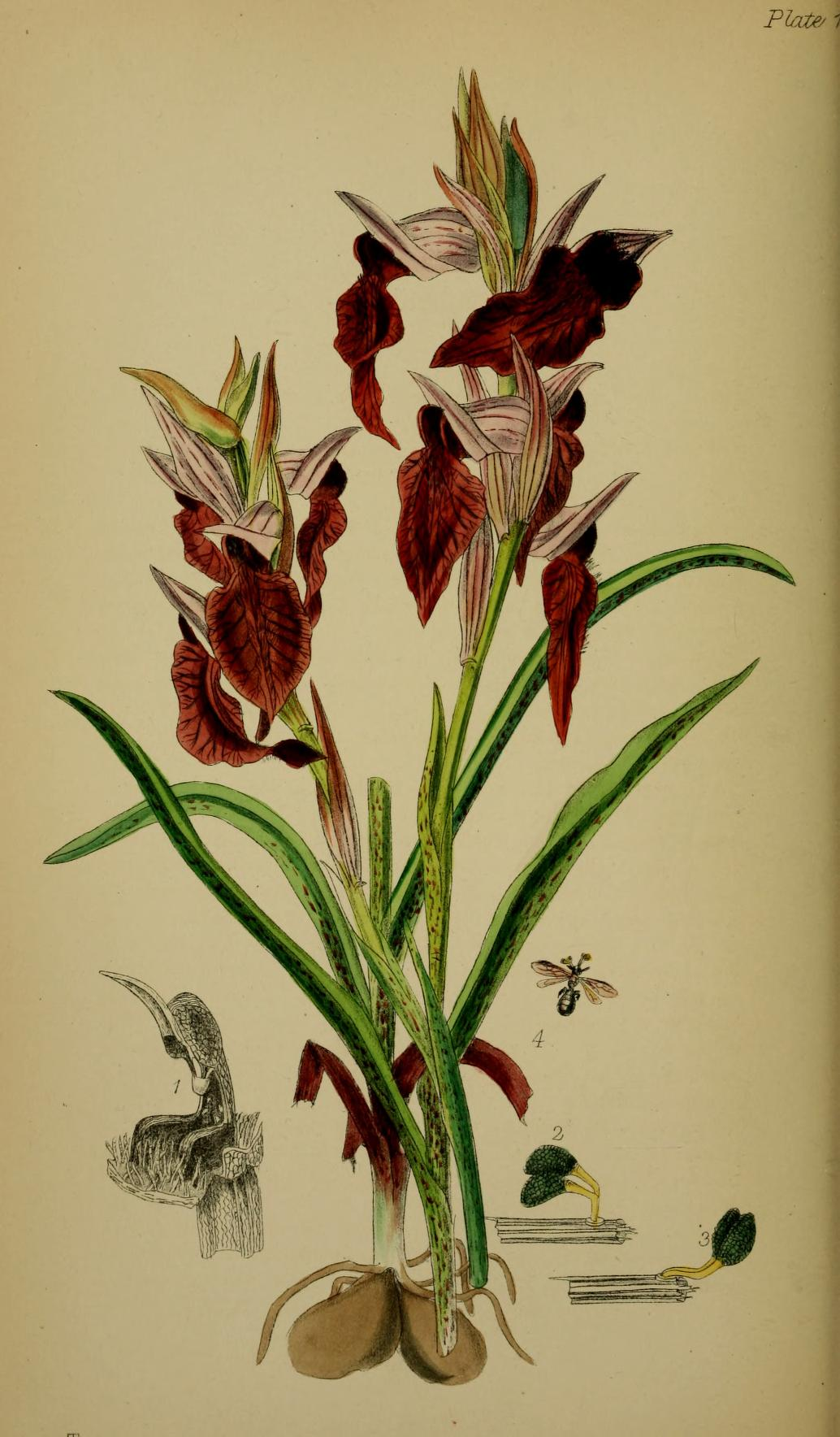
Serapias cordigera

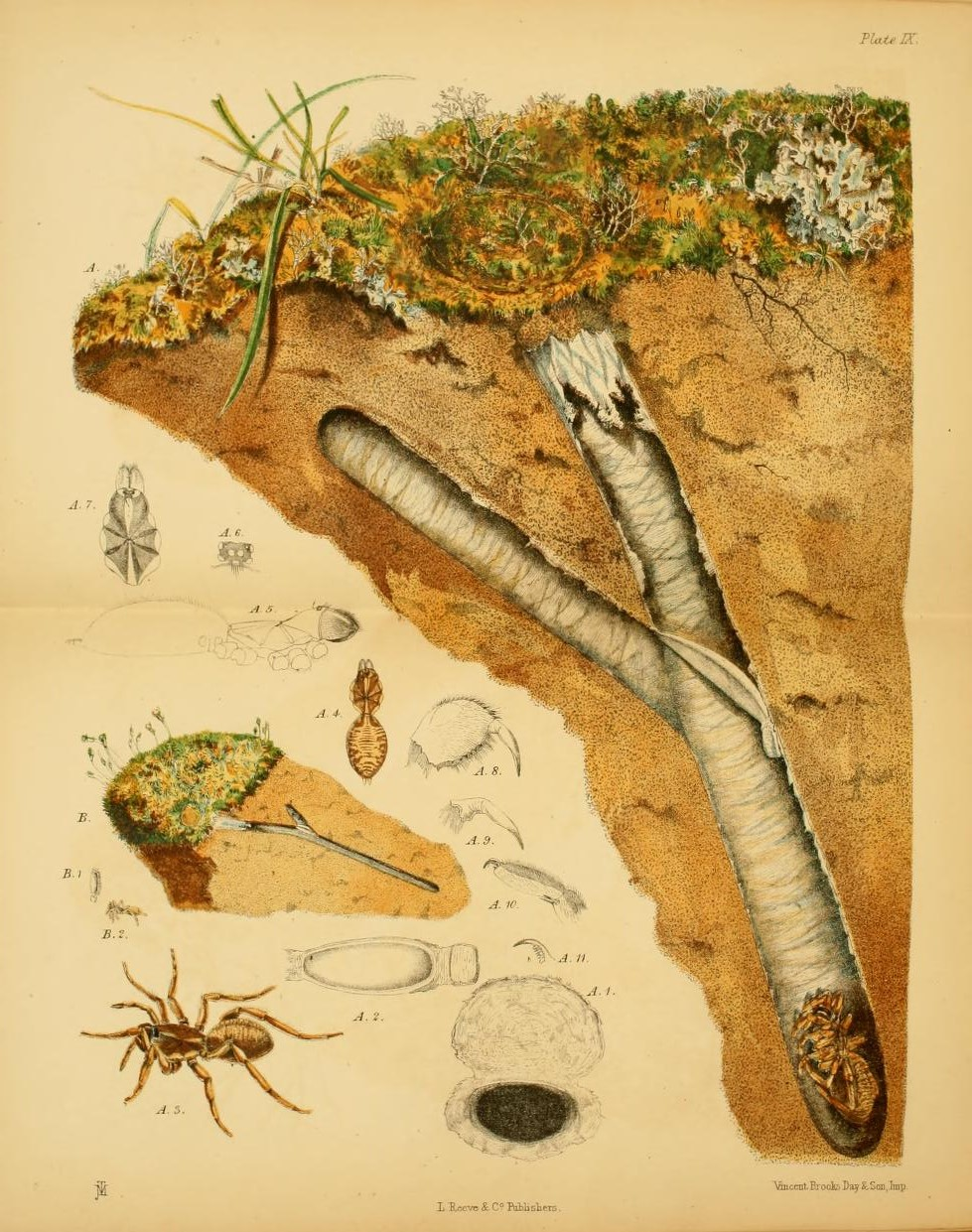
A trapdoor spider (Nemesia meridionalis) and its burrow

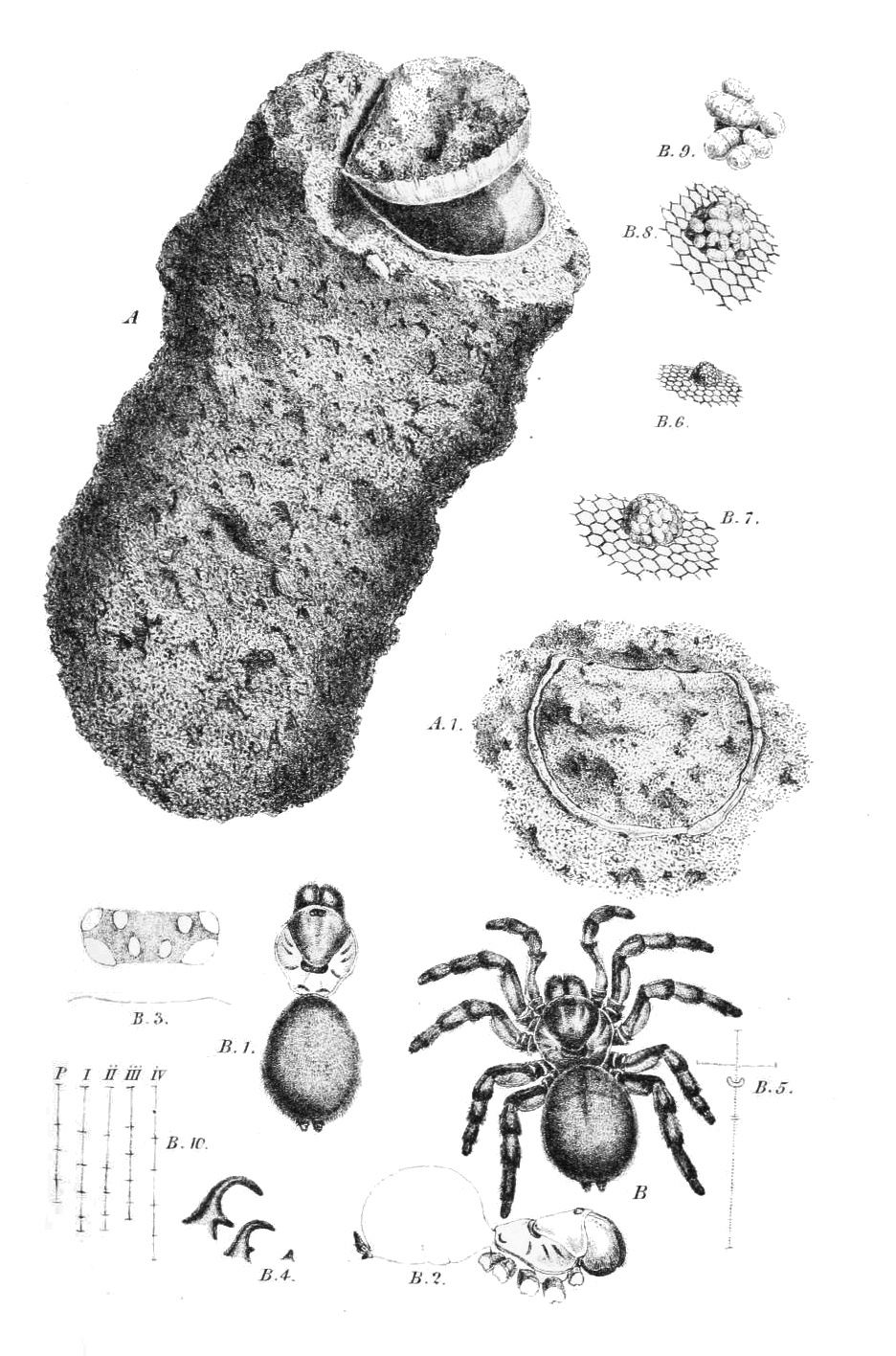
Bothriocyrtum californicum and burrow

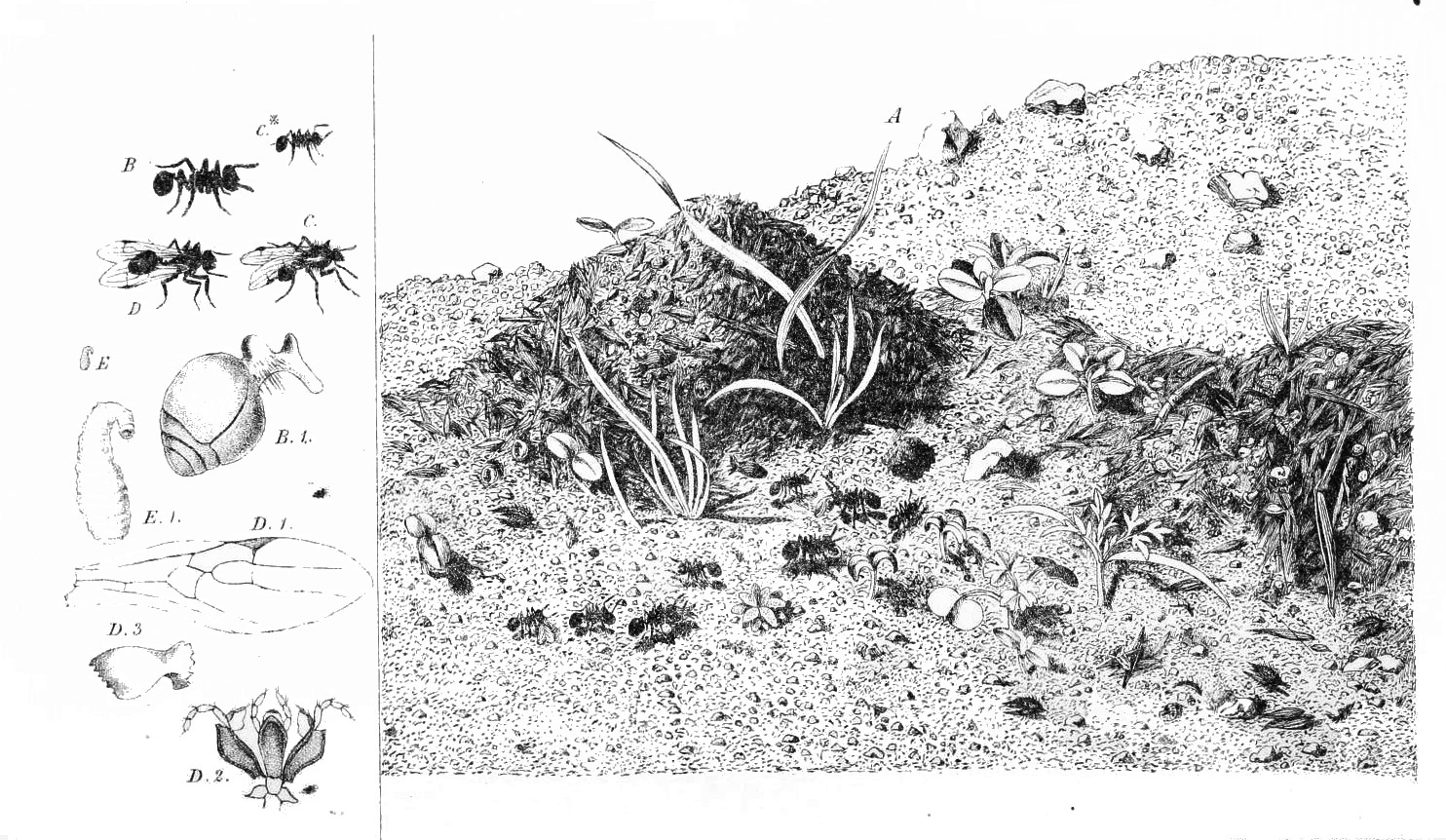
Harvester ants and nest
