= Gau iguana =

- Depiction of male & female

Conservation status
- Endangered (IUCN 3.1)
- CITES Appendix I (CITES)

Scientific classification
- Domain: Eukaryota
- Kingdom: Animalia
- Phylum: Chordata
- Class: Reptilia
- Order: Squamata
- Suborder: Iguania
- Family: Iguanidae
- Genus: Brachylophus
- Species: B. gau

Binomial name
- Brachylophus gau Fisher et al., 2017

Species of lizard

The Gau iguana (Brachylophus gau) is a species of iguana endemic to Gau Island in the Fijian archipelago. It mostly lives in the well-preserved upland forests of the island, with smaller populations in the degraded coastal forests. It can be distinguished from other South Pacific iguanas by the male's distinctive color pattern and solid green throat. It is also the smallest of all South Pacific iguanas, being about 13% smaller than the third smallest species and 40% smaller than the largest extant species.

The species was first recorded on Gau Island by the Scottish naturalist John MacGillivray in 1854, during his travels on HMS Herald. However, it did not receive a proper species description until 2017.

It is considered endangered on the IUCN Red List due to the presence of invasive mammalian predators on its island, such as black rats (Rattus rattus), Polynesian rats (Rattus exulans), feral cats (Felis catus), and free-ranging goats (Capra hircus). Forests are frequently burned for agriculture and eventually turn into grassland, accelerating habitat loss. Climate change may also play a threat by increasing cyclone intensity; while most native wildlife in Fiji is adapted to cyclones, they can create temporary gaps in the forests that can be taken over by invasive plant and insect species such as Mikania micrantha and yellow crazy ant (Anoplolepis gracilipes), from which they can expand their range.
