= Oceanic dispersal =

Biological dispersal across oceans

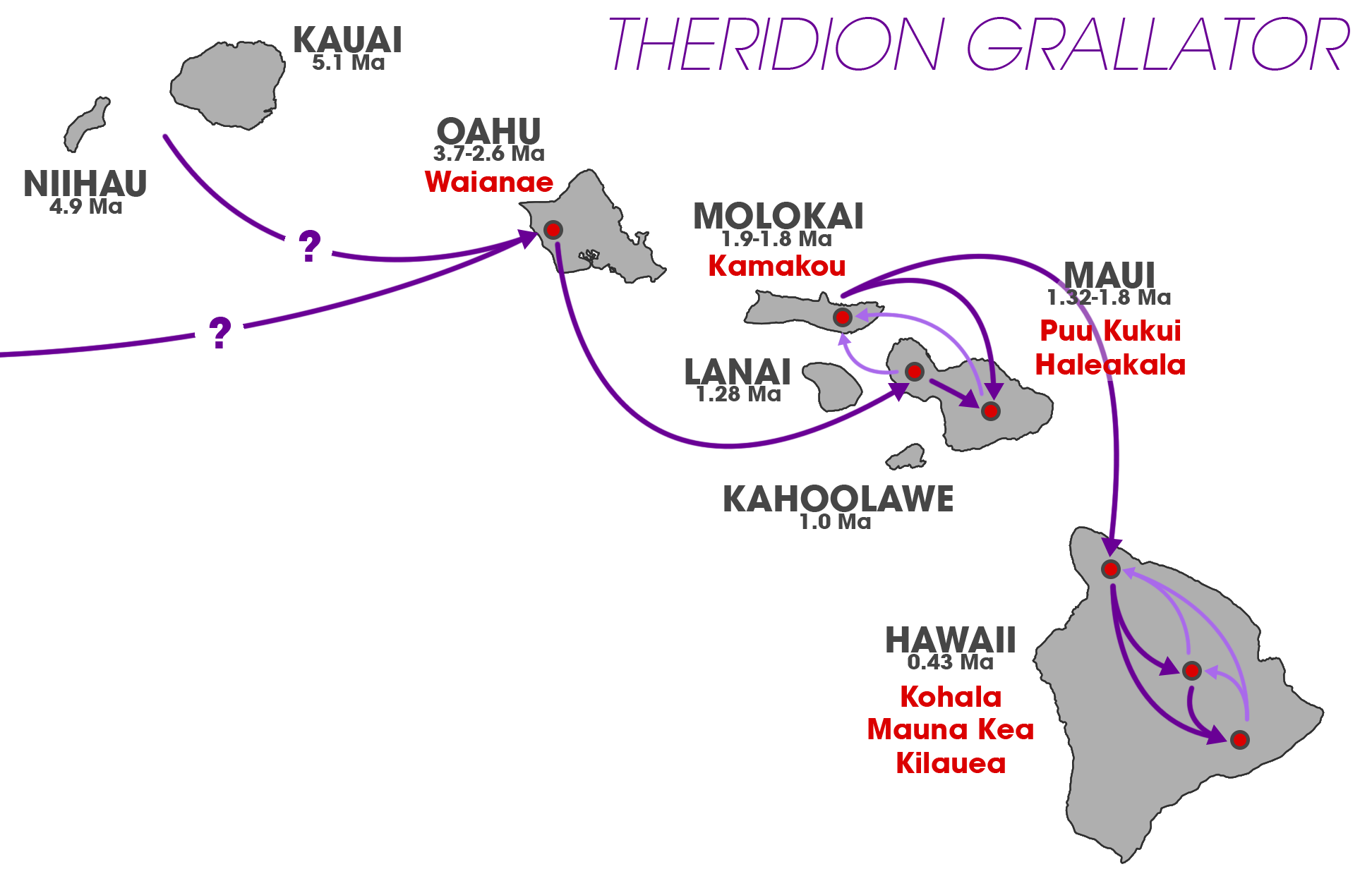
The colonization pathways of Theridion grallator through the eastern Hawaii islands

Oceanic dispersal is a type of biological dispersal that occurs when terrestrial organisms transfer from one land mass to another by way of a sea crossing. Island hopping is the crossing of an ocean by a series of shorter journeys between islands, as opposed to a single journey directly to the destination. Often this occurs via large rafts of floating vegetation such as are sometimes seen floating down major rivers in the tropics and washing out to sea, occasionally with animals trapped on them. Dispersal via such a raft is sometimes referred to as a rafting event. Colonization of land masses by plants can also occur via long-distance oceanic dispersal of floating seeds.

== History ==
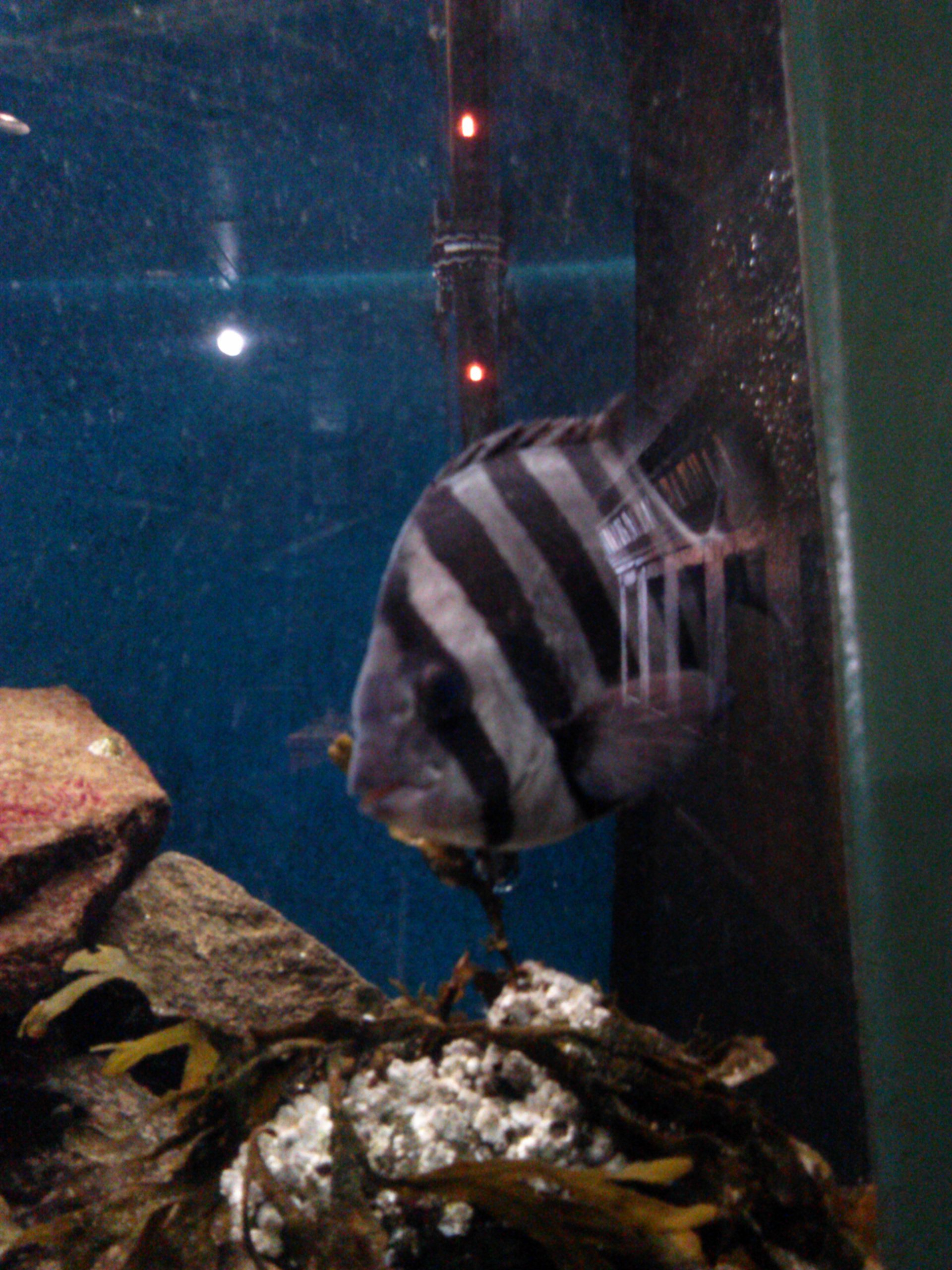
This barred knifejaw (Oplegnathus fasciatus) was transported from Japan to the United States inside a fishing boat that was washed out to sea by the 2011 Tohoku earthquake and tsunami.

Rafting has played an important role in the colonization of isolated land masses by mammals. Prominent examples include Madagascar, which has been isolated for ~120 million years (Ma), and South America, which was isolated for much of the Cenozoic. Both land masses, for example, appear to have received their primates by this mechanism. According to genetic evidence, the common ancestor of the lemurs of Madagascar appears to have crossed the Mozambique Channel by rafting between 50 and 60 Ma ago. Likewise, the New World monkeys are thought to have originated in Africa and rafted to South America by the Oligocene, when the continents were much closer than they are today. Madagascar also appears to have received its tenrecs (25–42 Ma ago), nesomyid rodents (20–24 Ma ago) and euplerid carnivorans (19–26 Ma ago) by this route and South America its caviomorph rodents (over 30 Ma ago). Simian primates (ancestral to monkeys) and hystricognath rodents (ancestral to caviomorphs) are believed to have previously rafted from Asia to Africa about 40 Ma ago.

Among reptiles, several iguanid species in the South Pacific have been hypothesized to be descended from iguanas that rafted 10,000 kilometres (6,200 mi) from Central or South America (an alternative theory involves dispersal of a putative now-extinct iguana lineage from Australia or Asia). Similarly, a number of clades of American geckos seem to have rafted over from Africa during both the Paleogene and Neogene. Skinks of the related genera Mabuya and Trachylepis also apparently both floated across the Atlantic from Africa to South America and Fernando de Noronha, respectively, during the last 9 Ma. Skinks from the same group have also rafted from Africa to Cape Verde, Madagascar, the Seychelles, the Comoros and Socotra. (Among lizards, skinks and geckos seem especially capable of surviving long transoceanic journeys.) Surprisingly, even burrowing amphisbaenians and blind snakes appear to have rafted from Africa to South America.

An example of a bird that is thought to have reached its present location by rafting is the weak-flying South American hoatzin, whose ancestors apparently floated over from Africa.

Colonization of groups of islands can occur by an iterative rafting process sometimes called island hopping. Such a process appears to have played a role, for example, in the colonization of the Caribbean by mammals of South American origin (i.e., caviomorphs, monkeys and sloths).

A remarkable example of iterative rafting has been proposed for spiders of the genus Amaurobioides. Members of this genus inhabit coastal sites and build silken cells which they seal at high tide; however, they do not balloon. DNA sequence analysis suggests that ancestors of the genus dispersed from southern South America to South Africa about 10 Ma ago, where the most basal clade is found; subsequent rafting events then took the genus eastward with the Antarctic Circumpolar Current to Australia, then to New Zealand and finally to Chile by about 2 Ma ago. Another example among spiders is the species Moggridgea rainbowi, the only Australian member of a genus otherwise endemic to Africa, with a divergence date of 2 to 16 Ma ago.

However, oceanic dispersal of terrestrial species may not always take the form of rafting; in some cases, swimming or simply floating may suffice. Tortoises of the genus Chelonoidis arrived in South America from Africa in the Oligocene; they were probably aided by their ability to float with their heads up, and to survive up to six months without food or fresh water. South American tortoises then went on to colonize the West Indies and Galápagos Islands.

The dispersal of semiaquatic species is likely to occur similarly. The dispersal of anthracotheres from Asia to Africa about 40 Ma ago, and the much more recent dispersal of hippos (relatives and possible descendants of anthracotheres) from Africa to Madagascar may have occurred by floating or swimming. Ancestors of the Nile crocodile are thought to have reached the Americas from Africa 5 to 6 Ma ago.

== Observation ==
The first documented example of colonization of a land mass by rafting occurred in the aftermath of hurricanes Luis and Marilyn in the Caribbean in 1995. A raft of uprooted trees carrying fifteen or more green iguanas was observed by fishermen landing on the east side of Anguilla – an island where they had never before been recorded. The iguanas had apparently been caught on the trees and rafted 200 mi (320 km) across the ocean from Guadeloupe, where they are indigenous. Examination of the weather patterns and ocean currents indicated that they had probably spent three weeks at sea before landfall. This colony began breeding on the new island within two years of its arrival.

The advent of human civilization has created opportunities for organisms to raft on floating artifacts, which may be more durable than natural floating objects. This phenomenon was noted following the 2011 Tōhoku tsunami in Japan, with about 300 species found to have been carried on debris by the North Pacific Current to the west coast of North America (although no colonizations have been detected thus far).

== See also ==
- Allopatric speciation
- Biological dispersal
- Panspermia
