= List of Toxopidae species =

This page lists all described genera and species of the spider family Toxopidae. As of April 2019, the World Spider Catalog accepts 87 species in 14 genera:

== Gasparia ==
Gasparia Marples, 1956

- Gasparia busa Forster, 1970 — New Zealand
- Gasparia coriacea Forster, 1970 — New Zealand
- Gasparia delli (Forster, 1955) — New Zealand (Antipodes Is., Auckland Is., Campbell Is.)
- Gasparia dentata Forster, 1970 — New Zealand
- Gasparia edwardsi Forster, 1970 — New Zealand
- Gasparia kaiangaroa Forster, 1970 — New Zealand (Chatham Is.)
- Gasparia littoralis Forster, 1970 — New Zealand
- Gasparia lomasi Forster, 1970 — New Zealand
- Gasparia mangamuka Forster, 1970 — New Zealand
- Gasparia manneringi (Forster, 1964) — New Zealand (Snares Is.)
- Gasparia montana Forster, 1970 — New Zealand
- Gasparia nava Forster, 1970 — New Zealand
- Gasparia nebulosa Marples, 1956 (type) — New Zealand
- Gasparia nelsonensis Forster, 1970 — New Zealand
- Gasparia nuntia Forster, 1970 — New Zealand
- Gasparia oparara Forster, 1970 — New Zealand
- Gasparia parva Forster, 1970 — New Zealand
- Gasparia pluta Forster, 1970 — New Zealand
- Gasparia rupicola Forster, 1970 — New Zealand
- Gasparia rustica Forster, 1970 — New Zealand
- Gasparia tepakia Forster, 1970 — New Zealand
- Gasparia tuaiensis Forster, 1970 — New Zealand

== Gohia ==
Gohia Dalmas, 1917

- Gohia clarki Forster, 1964 — New Zealand (Campbell Is.)
- Gohia falxiata (Hogg, 1909) (type) — New Zealand (Auckland Is.)
- Gohia isolata Forster, 1970 — New Zealand
- Gohia parisolata Forster, 1970 — New Zealand

== Hapona ==
Hapona Forster, 1970

- Hapona amira Forster, 1970 — New Zealand
- Hapona aucklandensis (Forster, 1964) — New Zealand
- Hapona crypta (Forster, 1964) — New Zealand
- Hapona insula (Forster, 1964) — New Zealand
- Hapona marplesi (Forster, 1964) — New Zealand
- Hapona moana Forster, 1970 — New Zealand
- Hapona momona Forster, 1970 — New Zealand
- Hapona muscicola (Forster, 1964) — New Zealand
- Hapona otagoa (Forster, 1964) (type) — New Zealand
- Hapona paihia Forster, 1970 — New Zealand
- Hapona reinga Forster, 1970 — New Zealand
- Hapona salmoni (Forster, 1964) — New Zealand
- Hapona tararua Forster, 1970 — New Zealand

== Hulua ==
Hulua Forster & Wilton, 1973

- Hulua convoluta Forster & Wilton, 1973 (type) — New Zealand
- Hulua manga Forster & Wilton, 1973 — New Zealand
- Hulua minima Forster & Wilton, 1973 — New Zealand
- Hulua pana Forster & Wilton, 1973 — New Zealand

== Jamara ==
Jamara Davies, 1995

- Jamara pisinna Davies, 1995 (type) — Australia (Queensland)

== Laestrygones ==
Laestrygones Urquhart, 1894

- Laestrygones albiceris Urquhart, 1894 (type) — New Zealand
- Laestrygones chathamensis Forster, 1970 — New Zealand (Chatham Is.)
- Laestrygones minutissimus (Hogg, 1909) — New Zealand (Auckland Is., Campbell Is.)
- Laestrygones otagoensis Forster, 1970 — New Zealand
- Laestrygones setosus Hickman, 1969 — Australia (Tasmania)
- Laestrygones westlandicus Forster, 1970 — New Zealand

== Lamina ==
Lamina Forster, 1970

- Lamina minor Forster, 1970 (type) — New Zealand
- Lamina montana Forster, 1970 — New Zealand
- Lamina parana Forster, 1970 — New Zealand
- Lamina ulva Forster, 1970 — New Zealand

== Midgee ==
Midgee Davies, 1995

- Midgee alta Davies, 1995 — Australia (Queensland)
- Midgee bellendenker Davies, 1995 — Australia (Queensland)
- Midgee binnaburra Davies, 1995 (type) — Australia (Queensland)
- Midgee littlei Davies, 1995 — Australia (Queensland)
- Midgee minuta Davies, 1995 — Australia (Queensland)
- Midgee monteithi Davies, 1995 — Australia (Queensland)
- Midgee parva Davies, 1995 — Australia (New South Wales)
- Midgee pumila Davies, 1995 — Australia (Queensland)
- Midgee thompsoni Davies, 1995 — Australia (Queensland)

== Myro ==
Myro O. Pickard-Cambridge, 1876

- †Myro extinctus Petrunkevitch, 1958 — Palaeogene Baltic amber
- †Myro hirsutus Petrunkevitch, 1942 — Palaeogene Baltic amber
- Myro jeanneli Berland, 1947 — Crozet Is.
- Myro kerguelenensis O. Pickard-Cambridge, 1876 (type) — Kerguelen, Macquarie Is.
  - Myro kerguelenensis crozetensis Enderlein, 1903 — Crozet Is.
- Myro maculatus Simon, 1903 — Australia (Tasmania)
- Myro marinus (Goyen, 1890) — New Zealand
- Myro paucispinosus Berland, 1947 — Marion Is., Crozet Is.
- Myro pumilus Ledoux, 1991 — Crozet Is.

== Neomyro ==
Neomyro Forster & Wilton, 1973

- Neomyro amplius Forster & Wilton, 1973 — New Zealand
- Neomyro circe Forster & Wilton, 1973 — New Zealand
- Neomyro scitulus (Urquhart, 1891) (type) — New Zealand

== Ommatauxesis ==
Ommatauxesis Simon, 1903

- Ommatauxesis macrops Simon, 1903 (type) — Australia (Tasmania)

== Otagoa ==
Otagoa Forster, 1970

- Otagoa chathamensis Forster, 1970 — New Zealand
- Otagoa nova Forster, 1970 (type) — New Zealand
- Otagoa wiltoni Forster, 1970 — New Zealand

== Toxops ==
Toxops Hickman, 1940

- Toxops montanus Hickman, 1940 (type) — Australia (Tasmania)

== Toxopsoides ==
Toxopsoides Forster & Wilton, 1973

- Toxopsoides erici Smith, 2013 — Australia (Queensland, New South Wales)
- Toxopsoides huttoni Forster & Wilton, 1973 (type) — Southeastern Australia, New Zealand
- Toxopsoides kathleenae Smith, 2013 — Australia (New South Wales)
- Toxopsoides macleayi Smith, 2013 — Australia (New South Wales)
