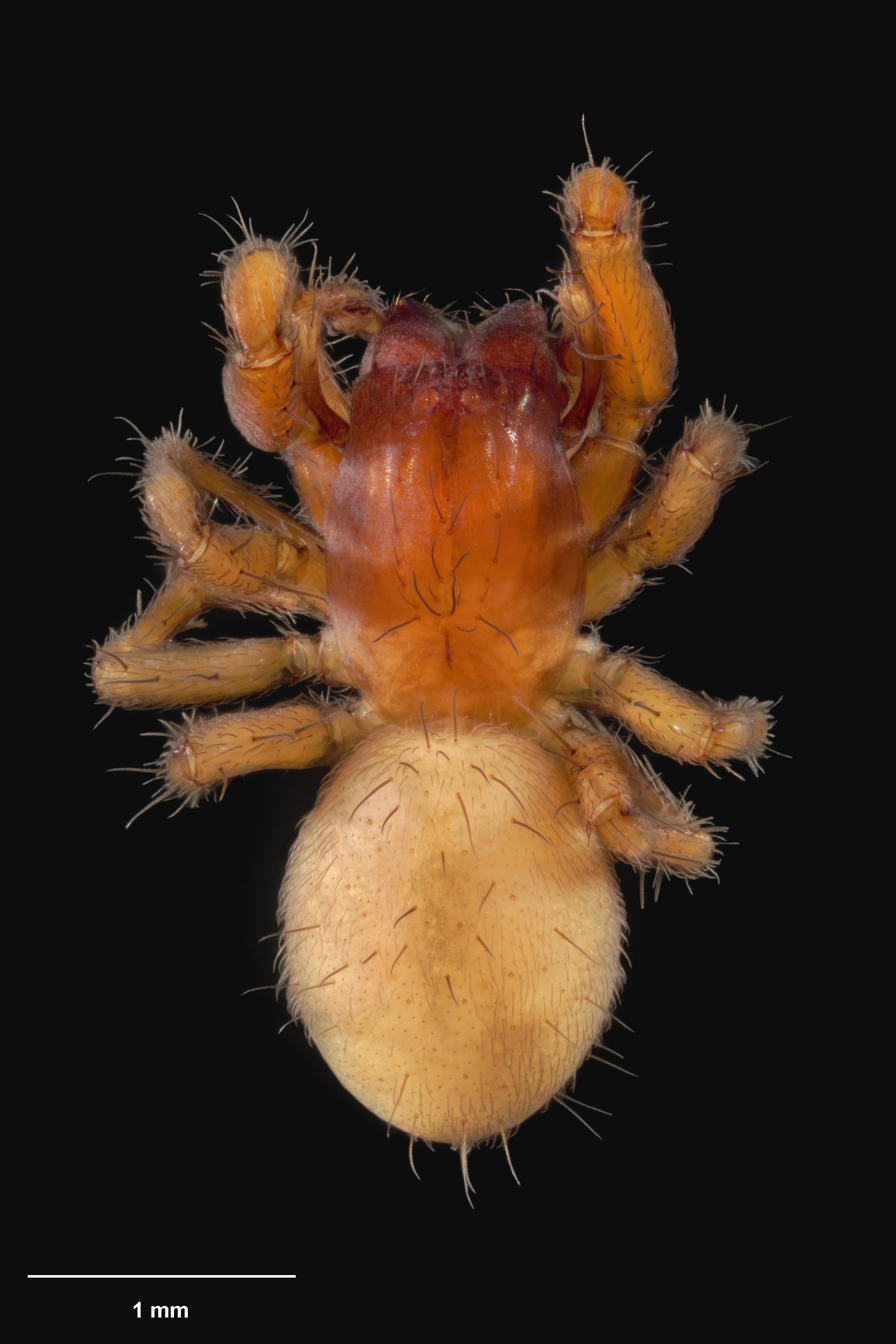
- Gasparia delli

Scientific classification
- Kingdom: Animalia
- Phylum: Arthropoda
- Subphylum: Chelicerata
- Class: Arachnida
- Order: Araneae
- Infraorder: Araneomorphae
- Family: Toxopidae
- Genus: Gasparia; Marples, 1956

Type species
- G. nebulosa Marples, 1956

Species
- 22, see text

Synonyms
- Hina Forster, 1964

= Gasparia =

Genus of spiders

Gasparia is a genus of South Pacific araneomorph spiders in the family Toxopidae, and was first described by Brian J. Marples in 1956. Originally placed with the intertidal spiders, it was moved to the Toxopidae in 2017. Ranging in size between 1.5–4 mm (0.059–0.157 in), the genus is endemic to New Zealand, with most members found living in forested areas.

== Description ==
In the original description, Marples described the genus as below:

Size small. Chelicerae with teeth on both margins of the groove. None of the spinnerets enlarged.

Members of the genus range in size from 1.5–4 mm (0.059–0.157 in), have a relatively low carapace and an ill-defined head region. The eye-group occupies between half to two-thirds of the width of the animal's heads. Eyes are ordered into two rows, and the clypeus is low. The genus most closely resembles Gohia visually, but can be differentiated by internal genitalia.

== Taxonomy ==
The genus was first described by Brian J. Marples in 1956, naming G. nebulosa as the type species. Originally a monotypic genus, G. nebulosa was joined by G. delli in 1967, when Pekka T. Lehtinen recombined the species (originally known as Ostearius delli, and later Hina delli). In the same paper, Lehtinen synonymised the genus Hina with Gasparia. The genus was greatly expanded in 1970, when Ray Forster described 19 new members of the genus, and recombined Myro manningeri as a member of Gasparia.

In 2017, the genus was moved from the Desidae family to Toxopidae, based on phylogenetic analysis. The analysis suggests that the closest related genus to Gasparia is Otagoa, and that the genus is more distantly related to Lamina, Myro and Ommatauxesis.

== Behaviour ==
Members of Gasparia do not construct snares, and typically lay egg sacs in a typical domed structure.

== Distribution and habitat ==
The species is endemic to New Zealand. Primarily found on the mainland, some species are endemic to off-shore islands, including G. delli found on the Antipodes Islands, Auckland Islands and Campbell Islands, G. kaiangaroa in the Chatham Islands, and G. manneringi on the Snares Islands. Most species are forest-dwellers, with a minority of species such as G. kaiangaroa, G. littoralis and G. nelsonensis are found on the seashore, and G. montana and G. rustica in alpine and lowland areas.

== Species ==
As of May 2019 it contains twenty-two species, all found in New Zealand:

- Gasparia busa Forster, 1970 – New Zealand
- Gasparia coriacea Forster, 1970 – New Zealand
- Gasparia delli (Forster, 1955) – New Zealand (Antipodes Is., Auckland Is., Campbell Is.)
- Gasparia dentata Forster, 1970 – New Zealand
- Gasparia edwardsi Forster, 1970 – New Zealand
- Gasparia kaiangaroa Forster, 1970 – New Zealand (Chatham Is.)
- Gasparia littoralis Forster, 1970 – New Zealand
- Gasparia lomasi Forster, 1970 – New Zealand
- Gasparia mangamuka Forster, 1970 – New Zealand
- Gasparia manneringi (Forster, 1964) – New Zealand (Snares Is.)
- Gasparia montana Forster, 1970 – New Zealand
- Gasparia nava Forster, 1970 – New Zealand
- Gasparia nebulosa Marples, 1956 (type) – New Zealand
- Gasparia nelsonensis Forster, 1970 – New Zealand
- Gasparia nuntia Forster, 1970 – New Zealand
- Gasparia oparara Forster, 1970 – New Zealand
- Gasparia parva Forster, 1970 – New Zealand
- Gasparia pluta Forster, 1970 – New Zealand
- Gasparia rupicola Forster, 1970 – New Zealand
- Gasparia rustica Forster, 1970 – New Zealand
- Gasparia tepakia Forster, 1970 – New Zealand
- Gasparia tuaiensis Forster, 1970 – New Zealand
