= Momona (disambiguation) =

Momona is a small town in New Zealand's South Island.

Momona may also refer to:

== People ==
- Momona Hirano, (平野 百菜, born 2006 ) Japanese idol by group SKE48
- Momona Kasahara, (笠原 桃奈; born 2003) Japanese singer and actress a past member of Angerme, a Japanese idol girl group
- Momona Kitō (鬼頭 桃菜; born 1993), also known as Yua Mikami, Japanese singer, YouTuber, and former pornographic film actress
- Momona Tamada, (born 2006) Canadian actress
- Momona (Jewelpet), the main protagonist of the Lady Jewelpet series

== Other uses ==
- Momona Airport, Dunedin international airport, at Momona, New Zealand
- Hapona momona, is a species of Toxopidae spider that is endemic to New Zealand
