= Laestrygones setosus =

Scientific classification
- Kingdom: Animalia
- Phylum: Arthropoda
- Subphylum: Chelicerata
- Class: Arachnida
- Order: Araneae
- Infraorder: Araneomorphae
- Family: Toxopidae
- Genus: Laestrygones
- Species: L. setosus

Binomial name
- Laestrygones setosus Hickman, 1969

Species of arachnid

Laestrygones setosus is a species of Toxopidae spider that is endemic to Tasmania, Australia.

== Taxonomy ==
This species was described by Vernon Victor Hickman in 1969, published in Papers and Proceedings of the Royal Society of Tasmania.
