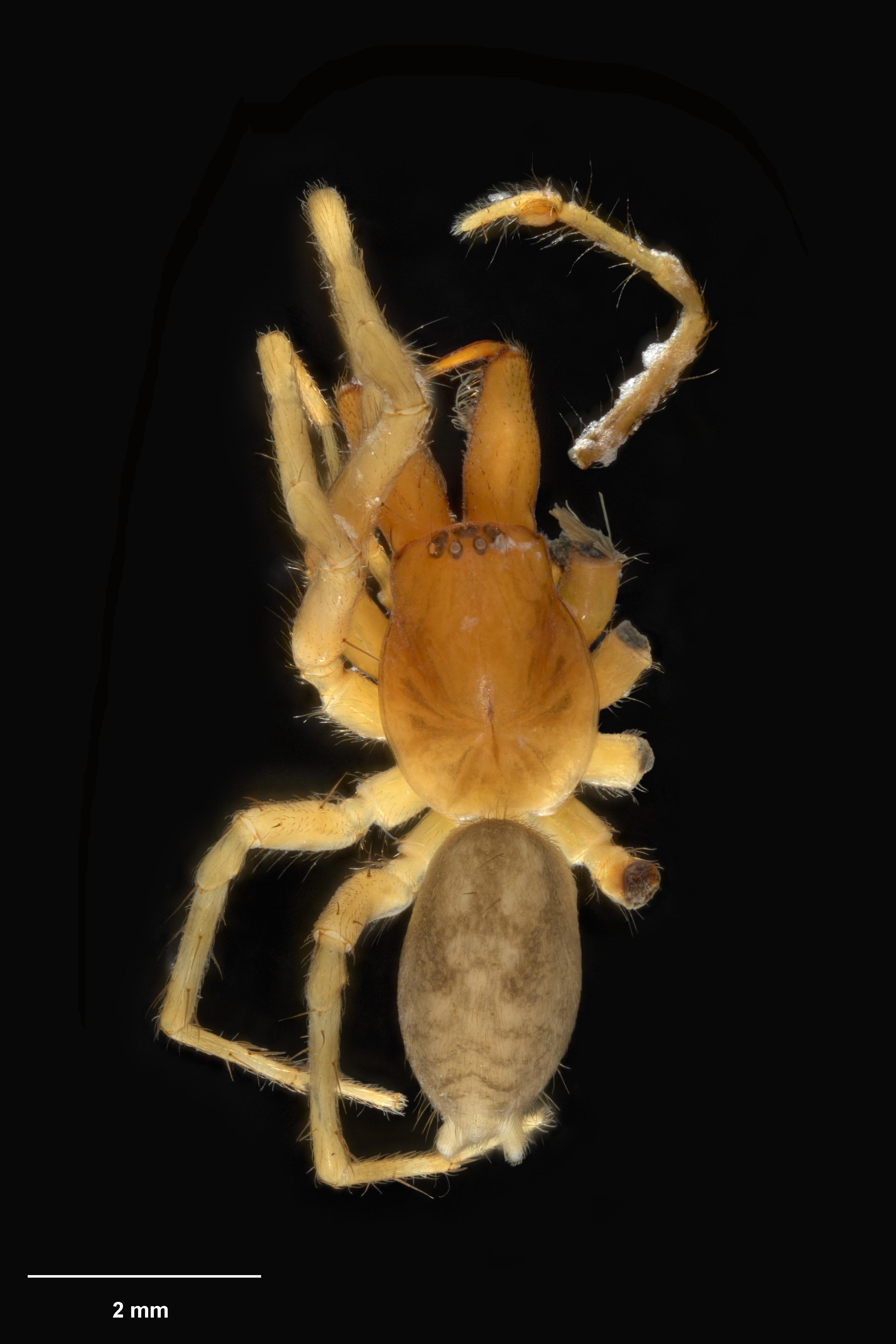

Conservation status
- Naturally Uncommon (NZ TCS)

Scientific classification
- Kingdom: Animalia
- Phylum: Arthropoda
- Subphylum: Chelicerata
- Class: Arachnida
- Order: Araneae
- Infraorder: Araneomorphae
- Family: Toxopidae
- Genus: Gohia
- Species: G. clarki

Binomial name
- Gohia clarki Forster, 1964

= Gohia clarki =

Species of spider

Gohia clarki is a species of Toxopidae spider that is endemic to New Zealand.

== Taxonomy ==
This species was described by Ray Forster in 1964 from male and female specimens. It was most recently revised in 1970. The holotype is stored in Te Papa Museum under registration AS.000016.

== Description ==
The male is recorded at 5.59mm in length whereas the female is 5.57mm. The cephalothorax is coloured pale brown with dark shading. The legs are pale brown with dark bands. The abdomen is shaded black and has a chevron pattern dorsally.

== Distribution ==
This species is only known from Campbell Island, New Zealand.

== Conservation status ==
Under the New Zealand Threat Classification System, this species is listed as "Naturally Uncommon" with the qualifiers of "Island Endemic" and "One Location".
