= Otagoa chathamensis =

Conservation status
- Naturally Uncommon (NZ TCS)

Scientific classification
- Kingdom: Animalia
- Phylum: Arthropoda
- Subphylum: Chelicerata
- Class: Arachnida
- Order: Araneae
- Infraorder: Araneomorphae
- Family: Toxopidae
- Genus: Otagoa
- Species: O. chathamensis

Binomial name
- Otagoa chathamensis Forster, 1970

Species of spider

Otagoa chathamensis is a species of Toxopidae spider that is endemic to New Zealand.

== Taxonomy ==
This species was described by Ray Forster in 1970 from female specimens. The holotype is stored in the Otago Museum.

== Description ==
The female is recorded at 9.02mm in length. The carapace is coloured reddish brown anteriorly and paler posteriorly. The legs are pale brown. The abdomen is shaded grey dorsally. and has a pale chevron pattern.

== Distribution ==
This species is only known from the Chatham Islands in New Zealand. It occurs along the coast.

== Conservation status ==
Under the New Zealand Threat Classification System, this species is listed as "Naturally Uncommon" with the qualifiers of "Range Restricted".
