= Gasparia edwardsi =

Conservation status
- Data Deficit (NZ TCS)

Scientific classification
- Kingdom: Animalia
- Phylum: Arthropoda
- Subphylum: Chelicerata
- Class: Arachnida
- Order: Araneae
- Infraorder: Araneomorphae
- Family: Toxopidae
- Genus: Gasparia
- Species: G. edwardsi

Binomial name
- Gasparia edwardsi Forster, 1970

Species of spider

Gasparia edwardsi is a species of Toxopidae spider that is endemic to New Zealand.

== Taxonomy ==
This species was described in 1970 by Ray Forster from male and female specimens.

== Description ==
The male is recorded at 3.12mm in length whereas the female is 2.88mm. The carapace is coloured orange brown. The legs are yellow brown with dark bands. The abdomen is shaded black with pale markings dorsally.

== Distribution ==
This species is only known from Wellington, New Zealand.

== Conservation status ==
Under the New Zealand Threat Classification System, this species is listed as "Data Deficient" with the qualifiers of "Data Poor: Size", "Data Poor: Trend" and "One Location".
