= Hulua pana =

Conservation status
- Data Deficit (NZ TCS)

Scientific classification
- Kingdom: Animalia
- Phylum: Arthropoda
- Subphylum: Chelicerata
- Class: Arachnida
- Order: Araneae
- Infraorder: Araneomorphae
- Family: Toxopidae
- Genus: Hulua
- Species: H. pana

Binomial name
- Hulua pana Forster & Wilton, 1973

Species of spider

Hulua pana is a species of Toxopidae spider that is endemic to New Zealand.

== Taxonomy ==
This species was described by Ray Forster in 1973 from female specimens. The holotype is stored in Otago Museum.

== Description ==
The female is recorded at 1.82mm in length. The carapace is coloured reddish brown. The legs are coloured pale yellow. The abdomen is purpilish grey.

== Distribution ==
This species is only known from Wellington, New Zealand.

== Conservation status ==
Under the New Zealand Threat Classification System, this species is listed as "Data Deficient" with the qualifiers of "Data Poor: Size" and "Data Poor: Trend".
