= Gasparia dentata =

Conservation status
- Data Deficient (NZ TCS)

Scientific classification
- Domain: Eukaryota
- Kingdom: Animalia
- Phylum: Arthropoda
- Subphylum: Chelicerata
- Class: Arachnida
- Order: Araneae
- Infraorder: Araneomorphae
- Family: Toxopidae
- Genus: Gasparia
- Species: G. dentata

Binomial name
- Gasparia dentata Forster, 1970

Species of spider

Gasparia dentata is a species of Toxopidae spider that is endemic to New Zealand.

== Taxonomy ==
This species was described in 1970 by Ray Forster from a male specimen. The holotype is stored in Te Papa Museum.

== Description ==
The male is recorded at 2.88mm in length. The carapace is coloured brown with pale yellow markings. The legs are pale yellow. The abdomen is grey with pale markings.

== Distribution ==
This species is only known from Stephens Island in New Zealand.

== Conservation status ==
Under the New Zealand Threat Classification System, this species is listed as "Data Deficient" with the qualifiers of "Data Poor: Size", "Data Poor: Trend" and "One Location".
