= Gasparia manneringi =

Conservation status
- Naturally Uncommon (NZ TCS)

Scientific classification
- Kingdom: Animalia
- Phylum: Arthropoda
- Subphylum: Chelicerata
- Class: Arachnida
- Order: Araneae
- Infraorder: Araneomorphae
- Family: Toxopidae
- Genus: Gasparia
- Species: G. manneringi

Binomial name
- Gasparia manneringi (Forster, 1964)

Synonyms
- Myro manneringi

Species of spider

Gasparia manneringi is a species of Toxopidae spider that is endemic to New Zealand.

== Taxonomy ==
This species was first described as Myro manneringi by Ray Forster in 1964 from male and female specimens. It was most recently revised in 1970, in which it was moved to the Gasparia genus. The holotype is stored in Canterbury Museum.

== Description ==
The male is recorded at 2.88mm in length whereas the female is 2.61mm. The male cephalothorax is coloured pale yellow brown. The legs and abdomen are creamy white. The female cephalothorax is pale reddish brown.

== Distribution ==
This species is only known from Snares Islands, New Zealand.

== Conservation status ==
Under the New Zealand Threat Classification System, this species is listed as "Naturally Uncommon" with the qualifiers of "Island Endemic" and "One Location".
