= Hapona muscicola =

Conservation status
- Not Threatened (NZ TCS)

Scientific classification
- Kingdom: Animalia
- Phylum: Arthropoda
- Subphylum: Chelicerata
- Class: Arachnida
- Order: Araneae
- Infraorder: Araneomorphae
- Family: Toxopidae
- Genus: Hapona
- Species: H. muscicola

Binomial name
- Hapona muscicola (Forster, 1964)

Synonyms
- Toxopsiella muscicola

Species of spider

Hapona muscicola is a species of Toxopidae spider that is endemic to New Zealand.

== Taxonomy ==
This species was described by Ray Forster in 1964 from female specimens. It was most recently revised in 1970. The holotype is stored in Canterbury Museum.

== Description ==
The female is recorded at 2.16mm in length.

== Distribution ==
This species is only known from Fiordland, New Zealand.

== Conservation status ==
Under the New Zealand Threat Classification System, this species is listed as "Not Threatened".
