= Laestrygones (spider) =

Scientific classification
- Kingdom: Animalia
- Phylum: Arthropoda
- Subphylum: Chelicerata
- Class: Arachnida
- Order: Araneae
- Infraorder: Araneomorphae
- Family: Toxopidae
- Genus: Laestrygones; Urquhart, 1894

Type species
- L. albiceris Urquhart, 1894

Species
- 6, see text

Synonyms
- Stiphidiellum Dalmas, 1917

Genus of spiders

Laestrygones is a genus of araneomorph spiders in the family Toxopidae, and was first described by A. T. Urquhart in 1894.

== Species ==
As of May 2019 it contains six species from New Zealand and Tasmania:

- Laestrygones albiceris Urquhart, 1894 (type) – New Zealand
- Laestrygones chathamensis Forster, 1970 – New Zealand (Chatham Is.)
- Laestrygones minutissimus (Hogg, 1909) – New Zealand (Auckland Is., Campbell Is.)
- Laestrygones otagoensis Forster, 1970 – New Zealand
- Laestrygones setosus Hickman, 1969 – Australia (Tasmania)
- Laestrygones westlandicus Forster, 1970 – New Zealand
