= Gasparia parva =

Conservation status
- Data Deficit (NZ TCS)

Scientific classification
- Kingdom: Animalia
- Phylum: Arthropoda
- Subphylum: Chelicerata
- Class: Arachnida
- Order: Araneae
- Infraorder: Araneomorphae
- Family: Toxopidae
- Genus: Gasparia
- Species: G. parva

Binomial name
- Gasparia parva Forster, 1970

Species of spider

Gasparia parva is a species of Toxopidae spider that is endemic to New Zealand.

== Taxonomy ==
This species was described by Ray Forster in 1970 from male and female specimens. The holotype is stored in Te Papa Museum under registration number AS.000081.

== Description ==
The male is recorded at 2.8mm in length whereas the female is 3.08mm. The carapace is coloured reddish brown and is paler laterally and posteriorly. The legs are yellow brown. The abdomen is creamy with a chevron pattern dorsally.

== Distribution ==
This species is only known from Hidden Island near Stewart Island, New Zealand.

== Conservation status ==
Under the New Zealand Threat Classification System, this species is listed as "Data Deficient" with the qualifiers of "Data Poor: Size", "Data Poor: Trend" and "One Location".
