= Otagoa nova =

Conservation status
- Naturally Uncommon (NZ TCS)

Scientific classification
- Kingdom: Animalia
- Phylum: Arthropoda
- Subphylum: Chelicerata
- Class: Arachnida
- Order: Araneae
- Infraorder: Araneomorphae
- Family: Toxopidae
- Genus: Otagoa
- Species: O. nova

Binomial name
- Otagoa nova Forster, 1970

Species of spider

Otagoa nova is a species of Toxopidae spider that is endemic to New Zealand.

== Taxonomy ==
This species was described by Ray Forster in 1970 from male and female specimens. The holotype is stored in the Otago Museum.

== Description ==
The male is recorded at 4.08mm in length whereas the female is 6.42mm. The carapace is coloured reddish brown. The legs are pale brown. The abdomen is grey with a chevron pattern dorsally.

== Distribution ==
This species is known from throughout New Zealand's coasts and occurs as far north as Taranaki.

== Conservation status ==
Under the New Zealand Threat Classification System, this species is listed as "Naturally Uncommon" with the qualifiers of "Climate Impact", "Data Poor: Trend" and "Range Restricted".
