= Hapona reinga =

Conservation status
- Naturally Uncommon (NZ TCS)

Scientific classification
- Kingdom: Animalia
- Phylum: Arthropoda
- Subphylum: Chelicerata
- Class: Arachnida
- Order: Araneae
- Infraorder: Araneomorphae
- Family: Toxopidae
- Genus: Hapona
- Species: H. reinga

Binomial name
- Hapona reinga Forster, 1970

Species of spider

Hapona reinga is a species of Toxopidae spider that is endemic to New Zealand.

== Taxonomy ==
This species was described by Ray Forster in 1970 from female and male specimens. The holotype is stored in Otago Museum.

== Description ==
The female is recorded at 2.03mm in length whereas the male is 1.62mm. The carapace has black markings laterally. The legs have black patches. The abdomen is dark dorsally and laterally.

== Distribution ==
This species is only known from Cape Reigna, New Zealand.

== Conservation status ==
Under the New Zealand Threat Classification System, this species is listed as "Naturally Uncommon" with the qualifier of "Range Restricted".
