= Gasparia rupicola =

Conservation status
- Data Deficit (NZ TCS)

Scientific classification
- Kingdom: Animalia
- Phylum: Arthropoda
- Subphylum: Chelicerata
- Class: Arachnida
- Order: Araneae
- Infraorder: Araneomorphae
- Family: Toxopidae
- Genus: Gasparia
- Species: G. rupicola

Binomial name
- Gasparia rupicola Forster, 1970

Species of spider

Gasparia rupicola is a species of Toxopidae spider that is endemic to New Zealand.

== Taxonomy ==
This species was described in by Ray Forster in 1970 from a female specimen. The holotype is stored in Otago Museum.

== Description ==
The female is recorded at 3.4mm in length. The carapace is coloured pale yellow brown and has a dark dorsal band. The legs are pale yellow with dark bands. The abdomen is grey with pale chevrons.

== Distribution ==
This species is only known from Canterbury, New Zealand.

== Conservation status ==
Under the New Zealand Threat Classification System, this species is listed as "Data Deficient" with the qualifiers of "Data Poor: Size", "Data Poor: Trend" and "One Location".
