= Gasparia kaiangaroa =

Conservation status
- Data Deficit (NZ TCS)

Scientific classification
- Kingdom: Animalia
- Phylum: Arthropoda
- Subphylum: Chelicerata
- Class: Arachnida
- Order: Araneae
- Infraorder: Araneomorphae
- Family: Toxopidae
- Genus: Gasparia
- Species: G. kaiangaroa

Binomial name
- Gasparia kaiangaroa Forster, 1970

Species of spider

Gasparia kaiangaroa is a species of Toxopidae spider that is endemic to New Zealand.

== Taxonomy ==
This species was described in 1970 by Ray Forster from a male specimen. The holotype is stored in Otago Museum.

== Description ==
The male is recorded at 3.52mm in length. The carapace is coloured reddish brown with pale markings. The legs are pale yellow brown. The abdomen is creamy with black markings dorsally.

== Distribution ==
This species is only known from Chatham Island, New Zealand.

== Conservation status ==
Under the New Zealand Threat Classification System, this species is listed as "Data Deficient" with the qualifiers of "Data Poor: Size", "Data Poor: Trend" and "One Location".
