= Hulua convoluta =

Conservation status
- Not Threatened (NZ TCS)

Scientific classification
- Kingdom: Animalia
- Phylum: Arthropoda
- Subphylum: Chelicerata
- Class: Arachnida
- Order: Araneae
- Infraorder: Araneomorphae
- Family: Toxopidae
- Genus: Hulua
- Species: H. convoluta

Binomial name
- Hulua convoluta Forster, 1973

Species of spider

Hulua convoluta is a species of Toxopidae spider that is endemic to New Zealand.

== Taxonomy ==
This species was described by Ray Forster in 1973 from male and female specimens. It is the type species of the Hulua genus. The holotype is stored in Auckland War Memorial Museum.

== Description ==
The male is recorded at 2.64mm in length whereas the female is 2.33mm.

== Distribution ==
This species is only known from the upper half of New Zealand's North Island.

== Conservation status ==
Under the New Zealand Threat Classification System, this species is listed as "Not Threatened".
