= Hapona paihia =

Conservation status
- Data Deficit (NZ TCS)

Scientific classification
- Kingdom: Animalia
- Phylum: Arthropoda
- Subphylum: Chelicerata
- Class: Arachnida
- Order: Araneae
- Infraorder: Araneomorphae
- Family: Toxopidae
- Genus: Hapona
- Species: H. paihia

Binomial name
- Hapona paihia Forster, 1970

Species of spider

Hapona paihia is a species of Toxopidae spider that is endemic to New Zealand.

== Taxonomy ==
This species was described by Ray Forster in 1970 from a female specimen. The holotype is stored in the Auckland War Memorial Museum under registration number AMNZ5055.

== Description ==
The female is recorded at 2.17mm in length. The abdomen has black shading laterally.

== Distribution ==
This species is only known from Bay of Islands, New Zealand.

== Conservation status ==
Under the New Zealand Threat Classification System, this species is listed as "Data Deficient" with the qualifiers of "Data Poor: Size" and "Data Poor: Trend".
