= Laestrygones chathamensis =

Conservation status
- Naturally Uncommon (NZ TCS)

Scientific classification
- Kingdom: Animalia
- Phylum: Arthropoda
- Subphylum: Chelicerata
- Class: Arachnida
- Order: Araneae
- Infraorder: Araneomorphae
- Family: Toxopidae
- Genus: Laestrygones
- Species: L. chathamensis

Binomial name
- Laestrygones chathamensis Forster, 1970

Species of spider

Laestrygones chathamensis is a species of Toxopidae spider that is endemic to New Zealand.

== Taxonomy ==
This species was described by Ray Forster in 1970 from male and juvenile specimens. The holotype is stored in Otago Museum.

== Description ==
The male is recorded at 2.49mm in length. The carapace is shaded laterally. The abdomen is creamy yellow.

== Distribution ==
This species is only known from Chatham Island, New Zealand.

== Conservation status ==
Under the New Zealand Threat Classification System, this species is listed as "Naturally Uncommon" with the qualifiers of "Island Endemic" and "Range Restricted".
