= Gasparia rustica =

Conservation status
- Not Threatened (NZ TCS)

Scientific classification
- Kingdom: Animalia
- Phylum: Arthropoda
- Subphylum: Chelicerata
- Class: Arachnida
- Order: Araneae
- Infraorder: Araneomorphae
- Family: Toxopidae
- Genus: Gasparia
- Species: G. rustica

Binomial name
- Gasparia rustica Forster, 1970

Species of spider

Gasparia rustica is a species of Toxopidae spider that is endemic to New Zealand.

== Taxonomy ==
This species was described in by Ray Forster in 1970 from male specimens.

== Description ==
The male is recorded at 2.6mm in length. The carapace is coloured reddish brown. The legs are yellow brown whereas the abdomen is blackish brown.

== Distribution ==
This species is only known from Otago, New Zealand.

== Conservation status ==
Under the New Zealand Threat Classification System, this species is listed as "Not Threatened".
