= Laestrygones minutissimus =

Conservation status
- Naturally Uncommon (NZ TCS)

Scientific classification
- Kingdom: Animalia
- Phylum: Arthropoda
- Subphylum: Chelicerata
- Class: Arachnida
- Order: Araneae
- Infraorder: Araneomorphae
- Family: Toxopidae
- Genus: Laestrygones
- Species: L. minutissimus

Binomial name
- Laestrygones minutissimus (Hogg, 1909)

Synonyms
- Stiphidion minutissimum; Stiphidiellum minutissimum; Laestrygones minutissimum; Laestrygones albiceres

Species of spider

Laestrygones minutissimus is a species of Toxopidae spider that is endemic to New Zealand.

== Taxonomy ==
This species was described as Stiphidion minutissimum by Henry Roughton Hogg in 1909 from a female specimen. It has undergone numerous revisions, but was mostly recently revised in 1970. The holotype is stored in Otago Museum.

== Description ==
The female is recorded at 3.48mm in length.

== Distribution ==
This species is only known from the Campbell Islands and Auckland Islands of New Zealand.

== Conservation status ==
Under the New Zealand Threat Classification System, this species is listed as "Naturally Uncommon" with the qualifier of "Range Restricted".
