= Gasparia mangamuka =

Conservation status
- Data Deficit (NZ TCS)

Scientific classification
- Kingdom: Animalia
- Phylum: Arthropoda
- Subphylum: Chelicerata
- Class: Arachnida
- Order: Araneae
- Infraorder: Araneomorphae
- Family: Toxopidae
- Genus: Gasparia
- Species: G. mangamuka

Binomial name
- Gasparia mangamuka Forster, 1970

Species of spider

Gasparia mangamuka is a species of Toxopidae spider that is endemic to New Zealand.

== Taxonomy ==
This species was described by Ray Forster in 1970 from a female specimen. The holotype is stored in Auckland War Memorial Museum under registration number AMNZ5053.

== Description ==
The female is recorded at 2.75mm in length. The carapace and abdomen have various black markings. The legs are pale yellow.

== Distribution ==
This species is only known from Mangamuka in Northland, New Zealand.

== Conservation status ==
Under the New Zealand Threat Classification System, this species is listed as "Data Deficient" with the qualifiers of "Data Poor: Size", "Data Poor: Trend" and "One Location".
