= Gasparia nebulosa =

Conservation status
- Data Deficient (NZ TCS)

Scientific classification
- Kingdom: Animalia
- Phylum: Arthropoda
- Subphylum: Chelicerata
- Class: Arachnida
- Order: Araneae
- Infraorder: Araneomorphae
- Family: Toxopidae
- Genus: Gasparia
- Species: G. nebulosa

Binomial name
- Gasparia nebulosa Marples, 1956

Species of spider

Gasparia nebulosa is a species of Toxopidae spider that is endemic to New Zealand. Originally described in 1956, the species is only known to occur on Great Island in Manawatāwhi / Three Kings Islands, northwest of mainland New Zealand.

== Description ==
In the original description, Marples described the species as below:

Female.—Carapace pale brown with dark lateral bands about one-third the distance from the edge to the centre formed of 4 or 5 coalescing marks. Dark round the eyes and a streak at the fovea. Appendages brown, the legs with dark bands on the femora, tibiae and metatarsi, most marked on IV scarcely visible on I. Sternum pale brown. Abdomen pale with dark pattern. Mid-dorsally and anterior band followed by two small spots, followed by three chevrons. A dark band on each side expanding posteriorly into a mottled area reaching the chevrons. Ventral side pale with no marks.

The female is recorded at 4.82 mm (0.190 in) in length. The carapace is coloured pale brown with dark bands laterally. The legs are brown. The abdomen is pale with a dark pattern dorsally.

== Taxonomy ==
This species was described by Brian Marples in 1956 from a female specimen. It was most recently revised in 1970. It is the type species for the Gasparia genus. The holotype was collected by Graham Turbott, and is stored in Auckland War Memorial Museum under registration number AMNZ5054.

== Distribution ==
This species is only known from Great Island in the Three Kings Islands of New Zealand. The holotype was collected from leaf litter under a stone.

== Conservation status ==
Under the New Zealand Threat Classification System, this species is listed as "Data Deficient" with the qualifiers of "Data Poor: Size", "Data Poor: Trend" and "One Location".
