= Hapona marplesi =

Conservation status
- Data Deficit (NZ TCS)

Scientific classification
- Kingdom: Animalia
- Phylum: Arthropoda
- Subphylum: Chelicerata
- Class: Arachnida
- Order: Araneae
- Infraorder: Araneomorphae
- Family: Toxopidae
- Genus: Hapona
- Species: H. marplesi

Binomial name
- Hapona marplesi (Forster, 1964)

Synonyms
- Toxopsiella marplesi

Species of spider

Hapona marplesi is a species of Toxopidae spider that is endemic to New Zealand.

== Taxonomy ==
This species was described by Ray Forster in 1964 from a female specimen. It was most recently revised in 1970. The holotype is stored in Otago Museum.

== Description ==
The female is recorded at 2.16mm in length.

== Distribution ==
This species is only known from Northland, New Zealand.

== Conservation status ==
Under the New Zealand Threat Classification System, this species is listed as "Data Deficient" with the qualifiers of "Data Poor: Size", "Data Poor: Trend" and "One Location".
