= Neomyro scitulus =

Conservation status
- Not Threatened (NZ TCS)

Scientific classification
- Kingdom: Animalia
- Phylum: Arthropoda
- Subphylum: Chelicerata
- Class: Arachnida
- Order: Araneae
- Infraorder: Araneomorphae
- Family: Toxopidae
- Genus: Neomyro
- Species: N. scitulus

Binomial name
- Neomyro scitulus (Urquhart, 1891)

Synonyms
- Habronestes scitula

Species of spider

Neomyro scitulus is a species of Toxopidae spider that is endemic to New Zealand.

== Taxonomy ==
This species was described as Habronestes scitula by Arthur Urquhart in 1891. It was most recently revised in 1973. The holotype is likely lost.

== Description ==
The spider is recorded at 2.32mm in length. The cephalothorax is coloured pale yellow and has a black patch surrounding the eyes. The legs are pale yellow. The abdomen has black markings dorsally and laterally.

== Distribution ==
This species is only known from Taranaki, New Zealand.

== Conservation status ==
Under the New Zealand Threat Classification System, this species is listed as "Not Threatened".
