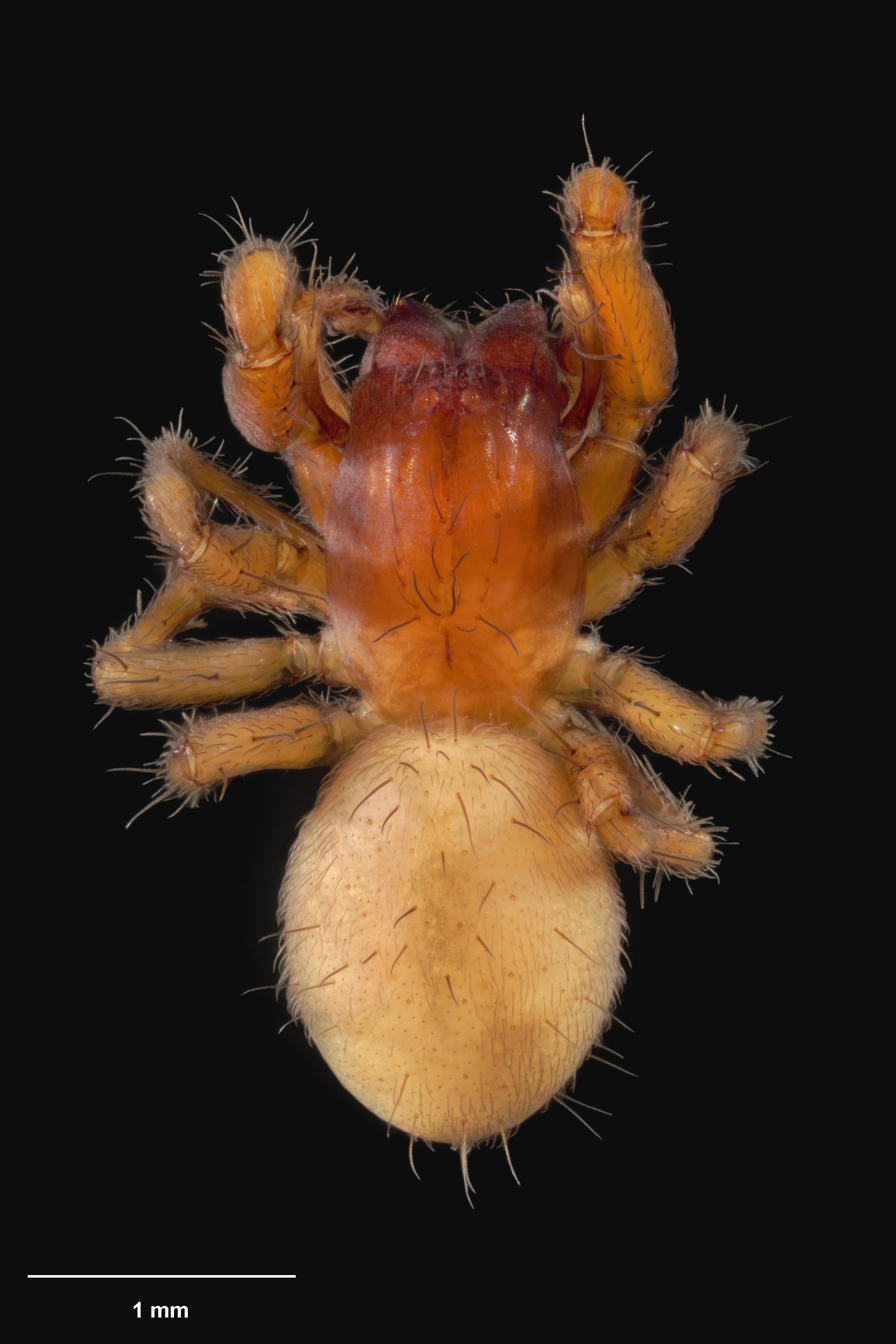

Conservation status
- Naturally Uncommon (NZ TCS)

Scientific classification
- Kingdom: Animalia
- Phylum: Arthropoda
- Subphylum: Chelicerata
- Class: Arachnida
- Order: Araneae
- Infraorder: Araneomorphae
- Family: Toxopidae
- Genus: Gasparia
- Species: G. delli

Binomial name
- Gasparia delli (Forster, 1955)

Synonyms
- Ostearius delli; Hina delli

= Gasparia delli =

Species of spider

Gasparia delli is a species of Toxopidae spider that is endemic to New Zealand.

== Taxonomy ==
This species was described in 1955 by Ray Forster from female and male specimens. The holotype is stored in Te Papa Museum under registration number AS.000020.

== Description ==
The male is recorded at 3.7mm in length. The cephalothorax and legs are coloured reddish brown. The abdomen is pale cream with a grey band dorsally.

== Distribution ==
This species is only known from Enderby Island in the Auckland Islands and the Antipodes Islands of New Zealand.

== Conservation status ==
Under the New Zealand Threat Classification System, this species is listed as "Naturally Uncommon" with the qualifier of "Range Restricted".
