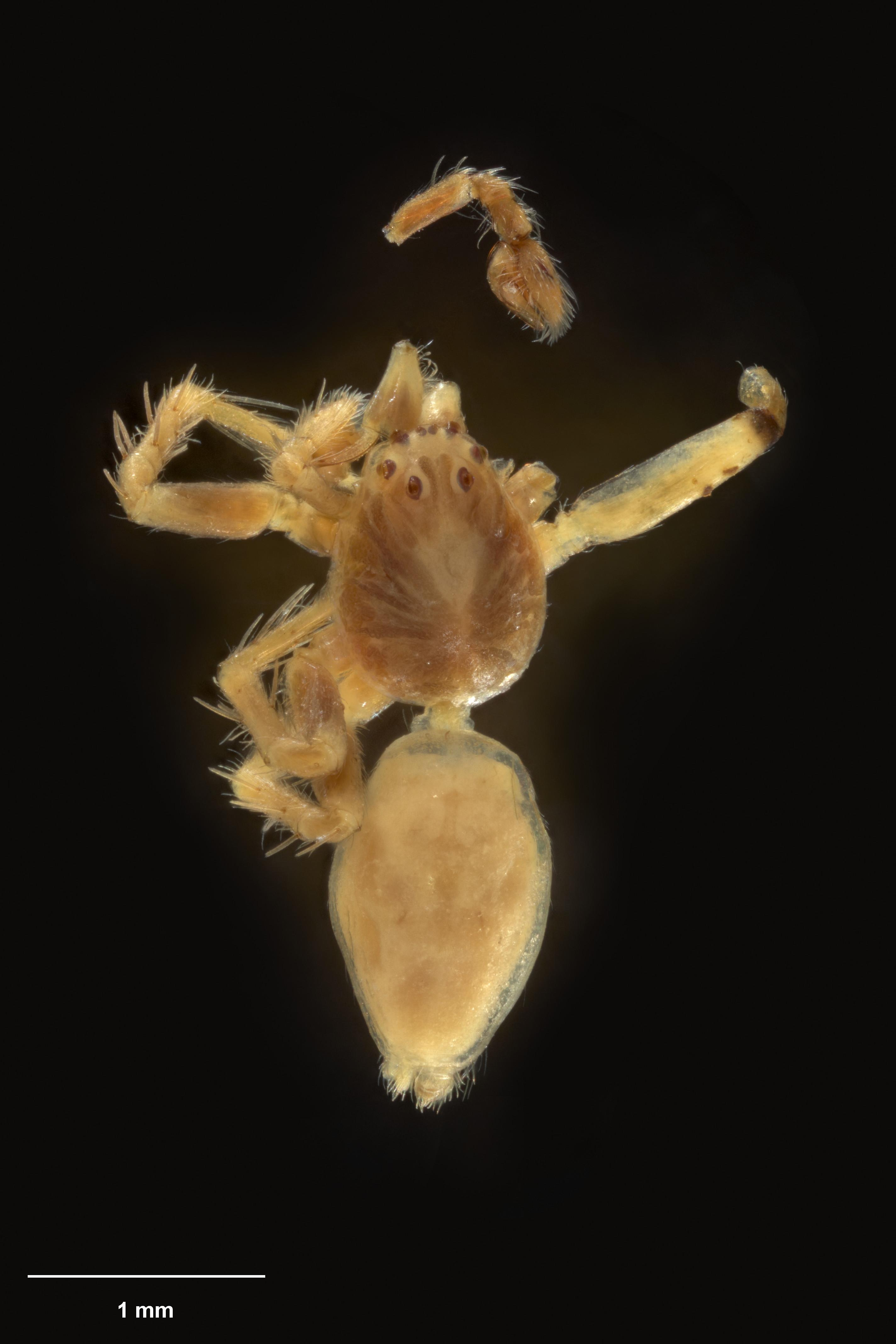

Conservation status
- Not Threatened (NZ TCS)

Scientific classification
- Kingdom: Animalia
- Phylum: Arthropoda
- Subphylum: Chelicerata
- Class: Arachnida
- Order: Araneae
- Infraorder: Araneomorphae
- Family: Toxopidae
- Genus: Lamina
- Species: L. parana

Binomial name
- Lamina parana Forster, 1970

= Lamina parana =

Species of spider

Lamina parana is a species of Toxopidae spider that is endemic to New Zealand.

== Taxonomy ==
This species was described by Ray Forster in 1970 from male specimens. The holotype is stored in Te Papa Museum under registration number AS.000080.

== Description ==
The male is recorded at 2.6mm in length. When alive, the spider is bright green in colour.

== Distribution ==
This species is only known from Nelson and Wellington, New Zealand.

== Conservation status ==
Under the New Zealand Threat Classification System, this species is listed as "Not Threatened".
