= Otagoa wiltoni =

Conservation status
- Data Deficit (NZ TCS)

Scientific classification
- Kingdom: Animalia
- Phylum: Arthropoda
- Subphylum: Chelicerata
- Class: Arachnida
- Order: Araneae
- Infraorder: Araneomorphae
- Family: Toxopidae
- Genus: Otagoa
- Species: O. wiltoni

Binomial name
- Otagoa wiltoni Forster, 1970

Species of spider

Otagoa wiltoni is a species of Toxopidae spider that is endemic to New Zealand.

== Taxonomy ==
This species was described by Ray Forster in 1970 from a female specimen. The holotype is stored in the Otago Museum.

== Description ==
The female is recorded at 7.24mm in length. The carapace is coloured reddish brown. The legs are pale yellow. The abdomen is steel grey with pale patches dorsally.

== Distribution ==
This species is only known from the coast in Otago, New Zealand.

== Conservation status ==
Under the New Zealand Threat Classification System, this species is listed as "Data Deficient" with the qualifiers of "Data Poor: Size", "Data Poor: Trend", "One Location" and "Range Restricted".
