= Gasparia lomasi =

Conservation status
- Data Deficit (NZ TCS)

Scientific classification
- Kingdom: Animalia
- Phylum: Arthropoda
- Subphylum: Chelicerata
- Class: Arachnida
- Order: Araneae
- Infraorder: Araneomorphae
- Family: Toxopidae
- Genus: Gasparia
- Species: G. lomasi

Binomial name
- Gasparia lomasi Forster, 1970

Species of spider

Gasparia lomasi is a species of Toxopidae spider that is endemic to New Zealand.

== Taxonomy ==
The species was described in 1970 by Ray Forster from a male specimen. The holotype is stored in Otago Museum.

== Description ==
The male is recorded at 4.4mm in length. The carapace is coloured reddish brown with pale areas. The legs are pale brown. The abdomen is creamy with black markings dorsally.

== Distribution ==
This species is only known from Auckland, New Zealand.

== Conservation status ==
Under the New Zealand Threat Classification System, this species is listed as "Data Deficient" with the qualifiers of "Data Poor: Size", "Data Poor: Trend" and "One Location".
