= Neomyro amplius =

Conservation status
- Not Threatened (NZ TCS)

Scientific classification
- Kingdom: Animalia
- Phylum: Arthropoda
- Subphylum: Chelicerata
- Class: Arachnida
- Order: Araneae
- Infraorder: Araneomorphae
- Family: Toxopidae
- Genus: Neomyro
- Species: N. amplius

Binomial name
- Neomyro amplius Forster & Wilton 1973

Species of spider

Neomyro amplius is a species of Toxopidae spider that is endemic to New Zealand.

== Taxonomy ==
This species was described by Ray Forster and Cecil Wilton in 1973 from female and male specimens. The holotype is stored in Otago Museum.

== Description ==
The spider is recorded at 1.84mm in length. The cephalothorax and legs are coloured pale yellow. The abdomen is creamy yellow with grey shading.

== Distribution ==
This species is only known from the north west of New Zealand's South Island.

== Conservation status ==
Under the New Zealand Threat Classification System, this species is listed as "Not Threatened".
