= Hapona otagoa =

Conservation status
- Not Threatened (NZ TCS)

Scientific classification
- Kingdom: Animalia
- Phylum: Arthropoda
- Subphylum: Chelicerata
- Class: Arachnida
- Order: Araneae
- Infraorder: Araneomorphae
- Family: Toxopidae
- Genus: Hapona
- Species: H. otagoa

Binomial name
- Hapona otagoa (Forster, 1964)

Synonyms
- Toxopsiella otagoa

Species of spider

Hapona otagoa is a species of Toxopidae spider that is endemic to New Zealand.

== Taxonomy ==
This species was described by Ray Forster in 1964 from a female specimen. It was most recently revised in 1970, in which the male was described. The holotype is stored in Otago Museum.

== Description ==
The male is recorded at 2.21mm in length whereas the female is 2.43mm. The carapace is coloured pale brown with shading laterally. The legs are dark brown with pale patches. The abdomen has brown patches dorsally.

== Distribution ==
This species is only known from Otago, New Zealand.

== Conservation status ==
Under the New Zealand Threat Classification System, this species is listed as "Not Threatened".
