= Gasparia oparara =

Conservation status
- Data Deficit (NZ TCS)

Scientific classification
- Kingdom: Animalia
- Phylum: Arthropoda
- Subphylum: Chelicerata
- Class: Arachnida
- Order: Araneae
- Infraorder: Araneomorphae
- Family: Toxopidae
- Genus: Gasparia
- Species: G. oparara

Binomial name
- Gasparia oparara Forster, 1970

Species of spider

Gasparia oparara is a species of Toxopidae spider that is endemic to New Zealand.

== Taxonomy ==
This species was described by Ray Forster in 1970 from female specimens. The holotype is stored in Otago Museum.

== Description ==
The female is recorded at 2.59mm in length. The carapace and legs are coloured yellow brown. The abdomen is shaded black.

== Distribution ==
This species is only known from near Karamea in the West Coast Region, New Zealand.

== Conservation status ==
Under the New Zealand Threat Classification System, this species is listed as "Data Deficient" with the qualifiers of "Data Poor: Size", "Data Poor: Trend" and "One Location".
