= Gohia isolata =

Conservation status
- Not Threatened (NZ TCS)

Scientific classification
- Kingdom: Animalia
- Phylum: Arthropoda
- Subphylum: Chelicerata
- Class: Arachnida
- Order: Araneae
- Infraorder: Araneomorphae
- Family: Toxopidae
- Genus: Gohia
- Species: G. isolata

Binomial name
- Gohia isolata Forster, 1970

Species of spider

Gohia isolata is a species of Toxopidae spider that is endemic to New Zealand.

== Taxonomy ==
This species was described by Ray Forster in 1970 from male and female specimens. The holotype is stored in Otago Museum.

== Description ==
The male is recorded at 3.8mm in length whereas the female is 3.92mm. The carapace and legs are coloured reddish brown. The abdomen is shaded grey.

== Distribution ==
This species is only known from Fiordland and Stewart Island, New Zealand.

== Conservation status ==
Under the New Zealand Threat Classification System, this species is listed as "Not Threatened".
