= Gohia falxiata =

Conservation status
- Naturally Uncommon (NZ TCS)

Scientific classification
- Domain: Eukaryota
- Kingdom: Animalia
- Phylum: Arthropoda
- Subphylum: Chelicerata
- Class: Arachnida
- Order: Araneae
- Infraorder: Araneomorphae
- Family: Toxopidae
- Genus: Gohia
- Species: G. falxiata

Binomial name
- Gohia falxiata (Hogg, 1909)

Synonyms
- Rubrius falxiatus; Gohia falcata; Chiracanthium wenhami; Gohia enderbyensis; Gohia wenhami

Species of spider

Gohia falxiata is a species of Toxopidae spider that is endemic to New Zealand.

== Taxonomy ==
This species was described as Rubrius falxiatus by Henry Roughton Hogg in 1909 from a male and immature specimen. It has undergone numerous revisions, but was most recently revised in 1970. The holotype is stored in Otago Museum.

== Description ==
The male is recorded at 6.32mm in length whereas the female is 7.2mm. The male carapace is coloured reddish brown with dark shading. The legs are pale brown. The abdomen is pale and patterned dorsally. The female carapace is coloured yellowish brown and has dark shading. The legs are pale brown with dark bands. The abdomen is creamy white with pale markings dorsally.

== Distribution ==
This species is only known from the Auckland Islands, New Zealand.

== Conservation status ==
Under the New Zealand Threat Classification System, this species is listed as "Naturally Uncommon" with the qualifiers of "One Location" and "Range Restricted".
