= Lamina montana =

Conservation status
- Data Deficit (NZ TCS)

Scientific classification
- Kingdom: Animalia
- Phylum: Arthropoda
- Subphylum: Chelicerata
- Class: Arachnida
- Order: Araneae
- Infraorder: Araneomorphae
- Family: Toxopidae
- Genus: Lamina
- Species: L. montana

Binomial name
- Lamina montana Forster, 1970

Species of spider

Lamina montana is a species of Toxopidae spider that is endemic to New Zealand.

== Taxonomy ==
This species was described by Ray Forster in 1970 from female specimens.

== Description ==
The female is recorded at 2.63mm in length. When alive, the spider is bright green in colour.

== Distribution ==
This species is only known from Taranaki, New Zealand.

== Conservation status ==
Under the New Zealand Threat Classification System, this species is listed as "Data Deficient" with the qualifiers of "Data Poor: Size", "Data Poor: Trend" and "One Location".
