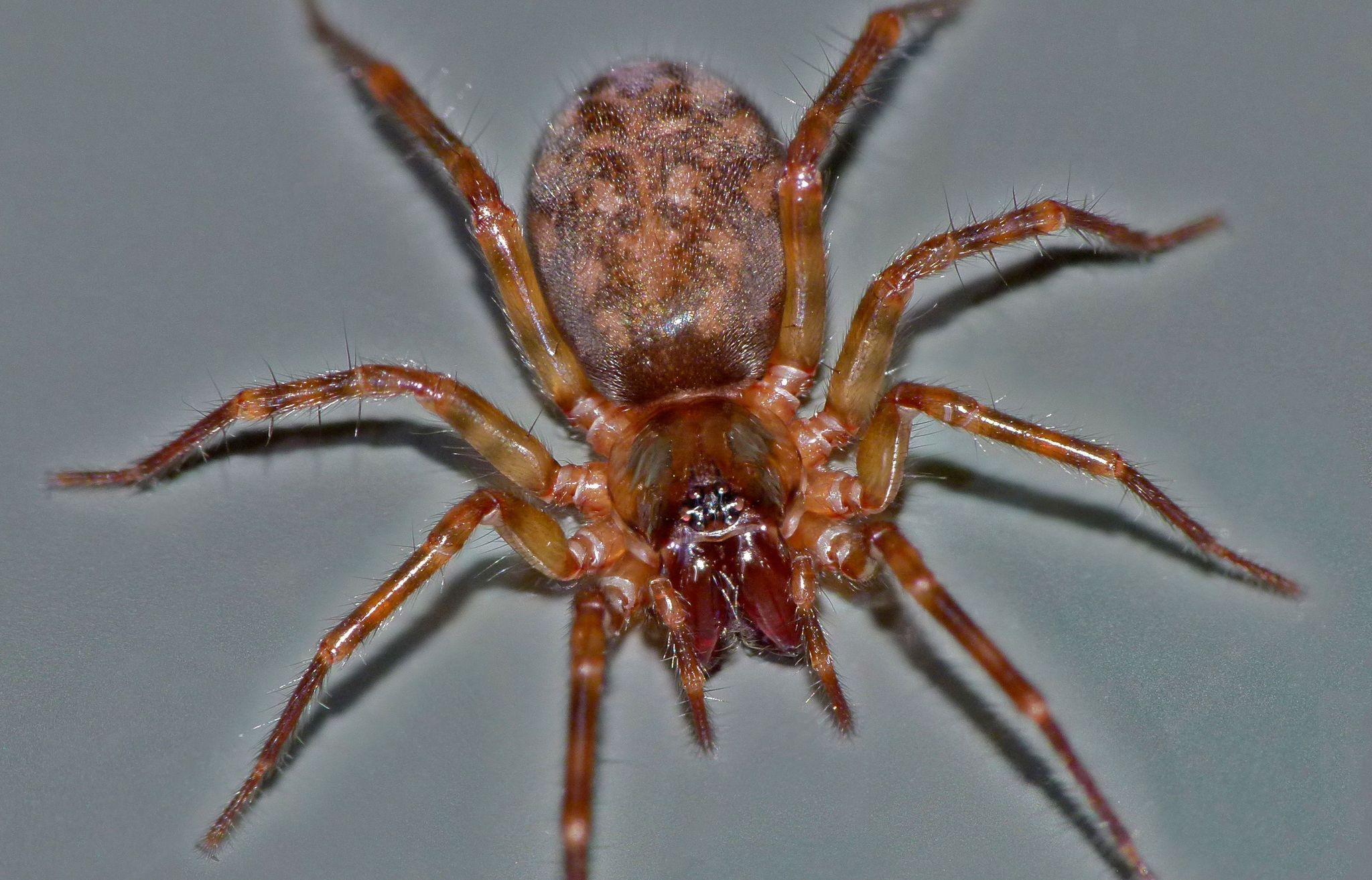

Conservation status
- Naturally Uncommon (NZ TCS)

Scientific classification
- Kingdom: Animalia
- Phylum: Arthropoda
- Subphylum: Chelicerata
- Class: Arachnida
- Order: Araneae
- Infraorder: Araneomorphae
- Family: Toxopidae
- Genus: Myro
- Species: M. marinus

Binomial name
- Myro marinus (Goyen, 1890)

Synonyms
- Habronestes marinus

= Myro marinus =

Species of spider

Myro marinus is a species of Toxopidae spider that is endemic to New Zealand.

== Taxonomy ==
This species was described by Peter Goyen in 1890 from female and male specimens. It was most recently revised in 1970.

== Description ==
The female is recorded at 7.51mm in length whereas the male is 5.22mm. The female carapace is darkly coloured with pale markings dorsally. The legs are pale yellowish brown. The abdomen is shaded black and has pale markings. The male has more extensive abdomen markings.

== Distribution ==
This species is only known from Otago and Stewart Island, New Zealand. It is restricted to the coastal intertidal zone.

== Conservation status ==
Under the New Zealand Threat Classification System, this species is listed as "Naturally Uncommon" with the qualifiers of "Climate Impact", "Data Poor: Trend" and "Range Restricted".
