= Gasparia coriacea =

Conservation status
- Not Threatened (NZ TCS)

Scientific classification
- Kingdom: Animalia
- Phylum: Arthropoda
- Subphylum: Chelicerata
- Class: Arachnida
- Order: Araneae
- Infraorder: Araneomorphae
- Family: Toxopidae
- Genus: Gasparia
- Species: G. coriacea

Binomial name
- Gasparia coriacea Forster, 1970

Species of spider

Gasparia coriacea is a species of Toxopidae spider that is endemic to New Zealand.

== Taxonomy ==
This species was described in 1970 by Ray Forster from male and female specimens. The holotype is stored in Auckland War Memorial Museum under registration number AMNZ5052.

== Description ==
The male is recorded at 2.30mm in length whereas the female is 2.28mm. The carapace is coloured dark brown with minimal markings. The legs are brown. The abdomen has various markings.

== Distribution ==
This species is only known from Mayor Island and White Island in New Zealand.

== Conservation status ==
Under the New Zealand Threat Classification System, this species is listed as "Not Threatened".
