= Gasparia tuaiensis =

Conservation status
- Data Deficit (NZ TCS)

Scientific classification
- Kingdom: Animalia
- Phylum: Arthropoda
- Subphylum: Chelicerata
- Class: Arachnida
- Order: Araneae
- Infraorder: Araneomorphae
- Family: Toxopidae
- Genus: Gasparia
- Species: G. tuaiensis

Binomial name
- Gasparia tuaiensis Forster, 1970

Species of spider

Gasparia tuaiensis is a species of Toxopidae spider that is endemic to New Zealand.

== Taxonomy ==
This species was described in by Ray Forster in 1970 from female and male specimens. The holotype is stored in Otago Museum.

== Description ==
The female is recorded at 2.52mm in length whereas the male is 2.52mm. The female carapace is coloured yellow brown and has faint shading. The legs are pale yellow brown. The abdomen is grey. In contrast, the male has more dark patterns.

== Distribution ==
This species is only known from Hawkes Bay, New Zealand.

== Conservation status ==
Under the New Zealand Threat Classification System, this species is listed as "Data Deficient" with the qualifiers of "Data Poor: Size" and "Data Poor: Trend".
