= Laestrygones albiceris =

Conservation status
- Not Threatened (NZ TCS)

Scientific classification
- Kingdom: Animalia
- Phylum: Arthropoda
- Subphylum: Chelicerata
- Class: Arachnida
- Order: Araneae
- Infraorder: Araneomorphae
- Family: Toxopidae
- Genus: Laestrygones
- Species: L. albiceris

Binomial name
- Laestrygones albiceris Urquhart, 1894

Synonyms
- Lycosa proxima; Laestrygones urquhartii

Species of spider

Laestrygones albiceris is a species of Toxopidae spider that is endemic to New Zealand.

== Taxonomy ==
This species was described as Lycosa proxima by Arthur Urquhart in 1886 from male and female specimens. The species name was later recognized to be preoccupied, so it was changed to Laestrygones albiceres. It has undergone several revisions. The holotype is stored in Canterbury Museum.

== Description ==
The female is recorded at 3.31mm in length. The carapace has black markings dorsally and laterally. The abdomen has dark shading.

== Distribution ==
This species is known from scattered localities in the North Island of New Zealand.

== Conservation status ==
Under the New Zealand Threat Classification System, this species is listed as "Not Threatened".
