= Hapona moana =

Conservation status
- Data Deficit (NZ TCS)

Scientific classification
- Kingdom: Animalia
- Phylum: Arthropoda
- Subphylum: Chelicerata
- Class: Arachnida
- Order: Araneae
- Infraorder: Araneomorphae
- Family: Toxopidae
- Genus: Hapona
- Species: H. moana

Binomial name
- Hapona moana Forster, 1970

Species of spider

Hapona moana is a species of Toxopidae spider that is endemic to New Zealand.

== Taxonomy ==
This species was described by Ray Forster in 1970 from a male specimen. The holotype is stored in Te Papa Museum under registration number AS.000070.

== Description ==
The male is recorded at 2.59mm in length. The carapace is shaded black with a pale patch. The legs are darkly coloured. The abdomen has a chevron pattern dorsally.

== Distribution ==
This species is only known from Waikaremoana, New Zealand.

== Conservation status ==
Under the New Zealand Threat Classification System, this species is listed as "Data Deficient" with the qualifiers of "Data Poor: Size", "Data Poor: Trend" and "One Location".
