= Hapona =

Scientific classification
- Kingdom: Animalia
- Phylum: Arthropoda
- Subphylum: Chelicerata
- Class: Arachnida
- Order: Araneae
- Infraorder: Araneomorphae
- Family: Toxopidae
- Genus: Hapona; Forster, 1970

Type species
- H. otagoa (Forster, 1964)

Species
- 13, see text

Genus of spiders

Hapona is a genus of South Pacific araneomorph spiders in the family Toxopidae, and was first described by Raymond Robert Forster in 1970. Originally placed with the intertidal spiders, it was moved to the Toxopidae in 2017.

== Species ==
As of May 2019 it contains thirteen species, all found in New Zealand:

- Hapona amira Forster, 1970 – New Zealand
- Hapona aucklandensis (Forster, 1964) – New Zealand
- Hapona crypta (Forster, 1964) – New Zealand
- Hapona insula (Forster, 1964) – New Zealand
- Hapona marplesi (Forster, 1964) – New Zealand
- Hapona moana Forster, 1970 – New Zealand
- Hapona momona Forster, 1970 – New Zealand
- Hapona muscicola (Forster, 1964) – New Zealand
- Hapona otagoa (Forster, 1964) (type) – New Zealand
- Hapona paihia Forster, 1970 – New Zealand
- Hapona reinga Forster, 1970 – New Zealand
- Hapona salmoni (Forster, 1964) – New Zealand
- Hapona tararua Forster, 1970 – New Zealand
