= Toxops =

Scientific classification
- Domain: Eukaryota
- Kingdom: Animalia
- Phylum: Arthropoda
- Subphylum: Chelicerata
- Class: Arachnida
- Order: Araneae
- Infraorder: Araneomorphae
- Family: Toxopidae
- Genus: Toxops; Hickman, 1940
- Species: T. montanus

Binomial name
- Toxops montanus Hickman, 1940

Genus of spiders

Toxops is a monotypic genus of Australian araneomorph spiders in the family Toxopidae containing the single species, Toxops montanus. It was first described by V. V. Hickman in 1940, and has only been found in Australia. Originally placed with the intertidal spiders, it was moved to the Toxopidae in 2017.
