= Toxopsoides huttoni =

Conservation status
- Data Deficit (NZ TCS)

Scientific classification
- Kingdom: Animalia
- Phylum: Arthropoda
- Subphylum: Chelicerata
- Class: Arachnida
- Order: Araneae
- Infraorder: Araneomorphae
- Family: Toxopidae
- Genus: Toxopsoides
- Species: T. huttoni

Binomial name
- Toxopsoides huttoni Forster & Wilton 1973

Species of spider

Toxopsoides huttoni is a species of Toxopidae spider that is native to Australia and New Zealand.

== Taxonomy ==
This species was described by Ray Forster and Cecil Wilton in 1973 from female and male specimens. The holotype is stored in Otago Museum.

== Description ==
The female is recorded at 3.87mm in length whereas the male is 3.33mm.

== Distribution ==
This species is known from Australia and New Zealand. In the latter, it is possibly an introduced species, but more research is needed to clarify on this.

== Conservation status ==
Under the New Zealand Threat Classification System, this species is listed as "Data Deficient" with the qualifiers of "Data Poor: Size", "Data Poor: Trend" and "One Location".
