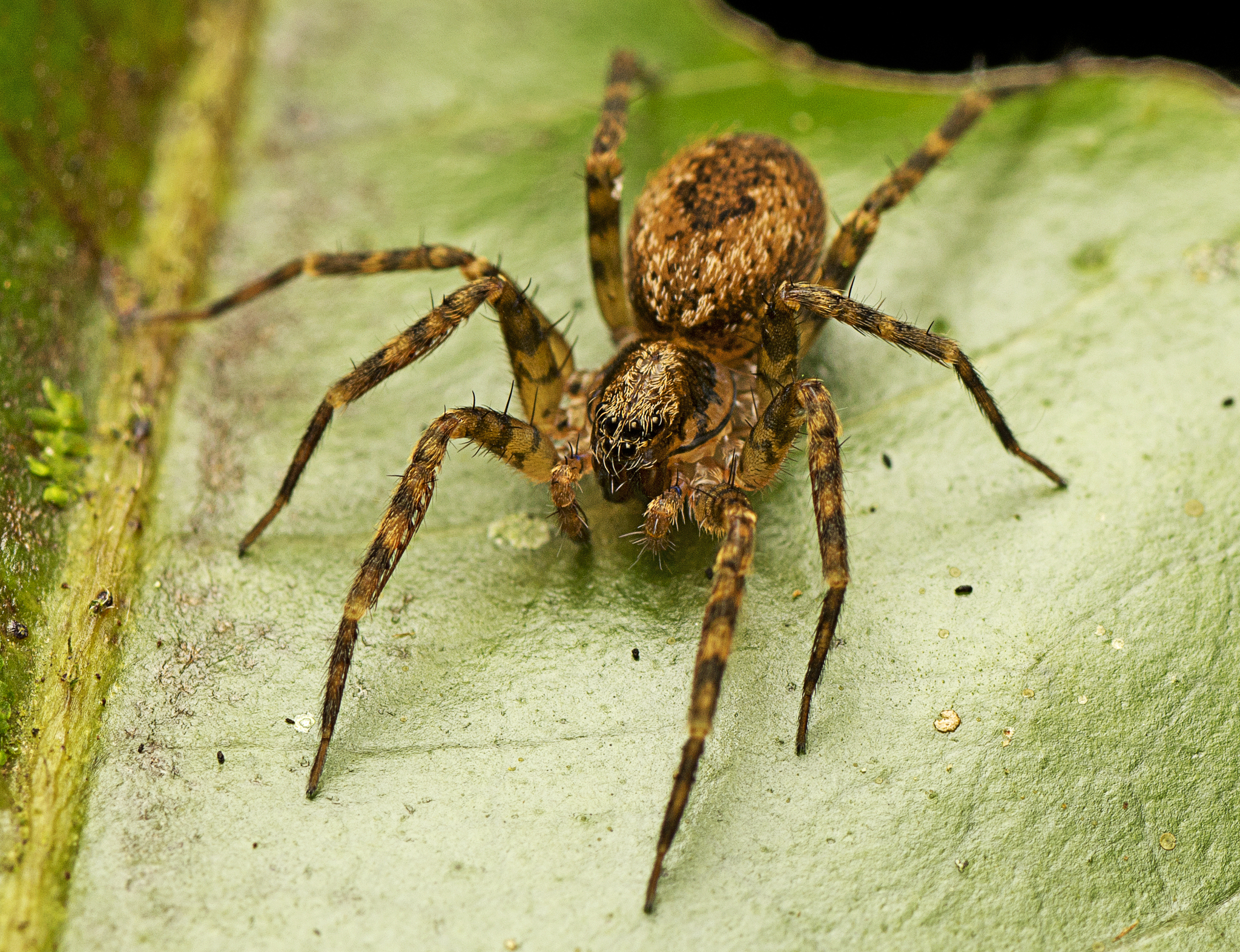
- Toxopsoides erici

Scientific classification
- Kingdom: Animalia
- Phylum: Arthropoda
- Subphylum: Chelicerata
- Class: Arachnida
- Order: Araneae
- Infraorder: Araneomorphae
- Family: Toxopidae
- Genus: Toxopsoides; Forster & Wilton, 1973

Type species
- T. huttoni Forster & Wilton, 1973

Species
- 4, see text

= Toxopsoides =

Genus of spiders

Toxopsoides is a genus of South Pacific araneomorph spiders in the family Toxopidae, and was first described by Raymond Robert Forster & C. L. Wilton in 1973. Originally placed with the intertidal spiders, it was moved to the Toxopidae in 2017.

== Species ==
As of May 2019 it contains four species:

- Toxopsoides erici Smith, 2013 – Australia (Queensland, New South Wales)
- Toxopsoides huttoni Forster & Wilton, 1973 (type) – Southeastern Australia, New Zealand
- Toxopsoides kathleenae Smith, 2013 – Australia (New South Wales)
- Toxopsoides macleayi Smith, 2013 – Australia (New South Wales)
