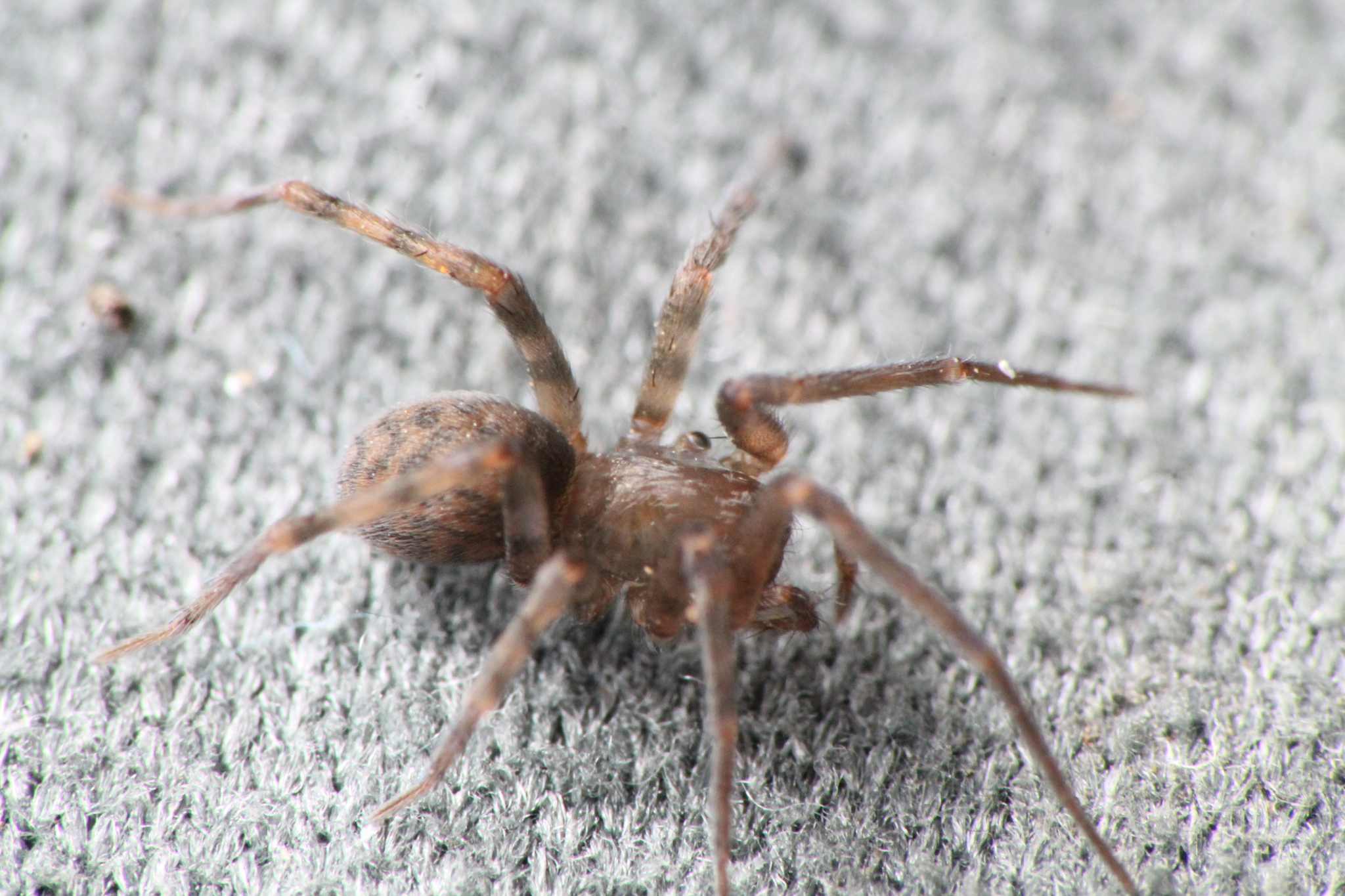

Scientific classification
- Kingdom: Animalia
- Phylum: Arthropoda
- Subphylum: Chelicerata
- Class: Arachnida
- Order: Araneae
- Infraorder: Araneomorphae
- Family: Toxopidae
- Genus: Hulua; Forster & Wilton, 1973

Type species
- H. convoluta Forster & Wilton, 1973

Species
- 4, see text

= Hulua =

Genus of spiders

Hulua is a genus of araneomorph spiders in the family Toxopidae, and was first described by Raymond Robert Forster & C. L. Wilton in 1973. Originally placed with the intertidal spiders, it was moved to the Toxopidae in 2017.

== Species ==
As of May 2019 it contains four species, all found in New Zealand:

- Hulua convoluta Forster & Wilton, 1973 (type) – New Zealand
- Hulua manga Forster & Wilton, 1973 – New Zealand
- Hulua minima Forster & Wilton, 1973 – New Zealand
- Hulua pana Forster & Wilton, 1973 – New Zealand
