= Jamara =

Scientific classification
- Domain: Eukaryota
- Kingdom: Animalia
- Phylum: Arthropoda
- Subphylum: Chelicerata
- Class: Arachnida
- Order: Araneae
- Infraorder: Araneomorphae
- Family: Toxopidae
- Genus: Jamara
- Species: J. pisinna

Binomial name
- Jamara pisinna Davies, 1995

Genus of spiders

Jamara is a genus of Australian araneomorph spiders in the family Toxopidae, containing the single species, Jamara pisinna. It was first described by V. T. Davies in 1995, and has only been found in Australia.
