= Neomyro =

Scientific classification
- Kingdom: Animalia
- Phylum: Arthropoda
- Subphylum: Chelicerata
- Class: Arachnida
- Order: Araneae
- Infraorder: Araneomorphae
- Family: Toxopidae
- Genus: Neomyro; Forster & Wilton, 1973

Type species
- N. scitulus (Urquhart, 1891)

Species
- N. amplius Forster & Wilton, 1973 – New Zealand; N. circe Forster & Wilton, 1973 – New Zealand; N. scitulus (Urquhart, 1891) – New Zealand

Genus of spiders

Neomyro is a genus of South Pacific araneomorph spiders in the family Toxopidae, and was first described by Raymond Robert Forster & C. L. Wilton in 1973. As of May 2019 it contains only three species, all found in New Zealand: N. amplius, N. circe, and N. scitulus. Originally placed with the intertidal spiders, it was moved to the Toxopidae in 2017.
