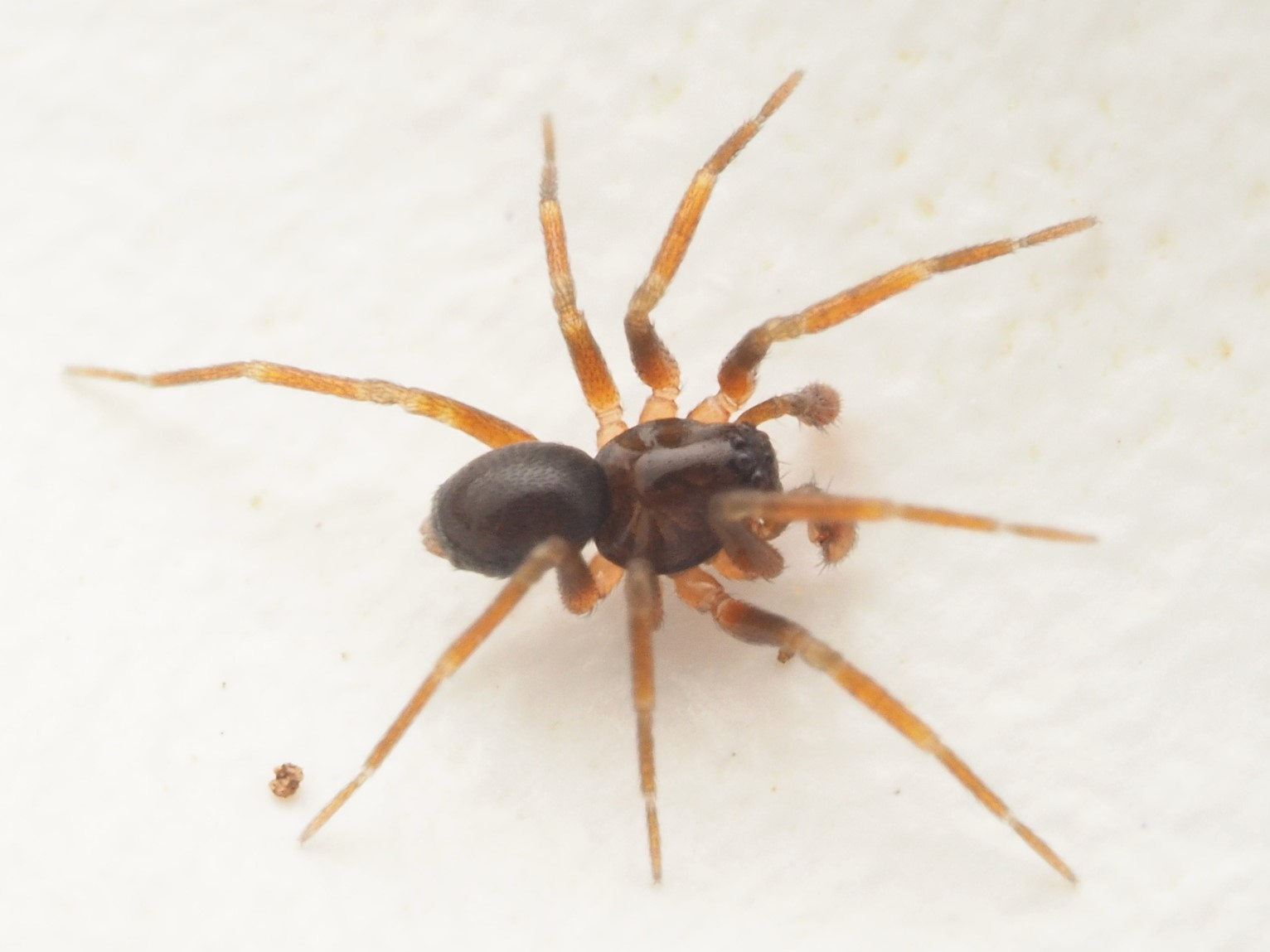

Scientific classification
- Domain: Eukaryota
- Kingdom: Animalia
- Phylum: Arthropoda
- Subphylum: Chelicerata
- Class: Arachnida
- Order: Araneae
- Infraorder: Araneomorphae
- Family: Toxopidae
- Genus: Midgee; Davies, 1995

Type species
- M. binnaburra Davies, 1995

Species
- 9, see text

= Midgee =

Genus of spiders

Midgee is a genus of Australian araneomorph spiders in the family Toxopidae, first described by V. T. Davies in 1995.

== Species ==
As of April 2019 it contains nine species:

- Midgee alta Davies, 1995 – Australia (Queensland)
- Midgee bellendenker Davies, 1995 – Australia (Queensland)
- Midgee binnaburra Davies, 1995 – Australia (Queensland)
- Midgee littlei Davies, 1995 – Australia (Queensland)
- Midgee minuta Davies, 1995 – Australia (Queensland)
- Midgee monteithi Davies, 1995 – Australia (Queensland)
- Midgee parva Davies, 1995 – Australia (New South Wales)
- Midgee pumila Davies, 1995 – Australia (Queensland)
- Midgee thompsoni Davies, 1995 – Australia (Queensland)
