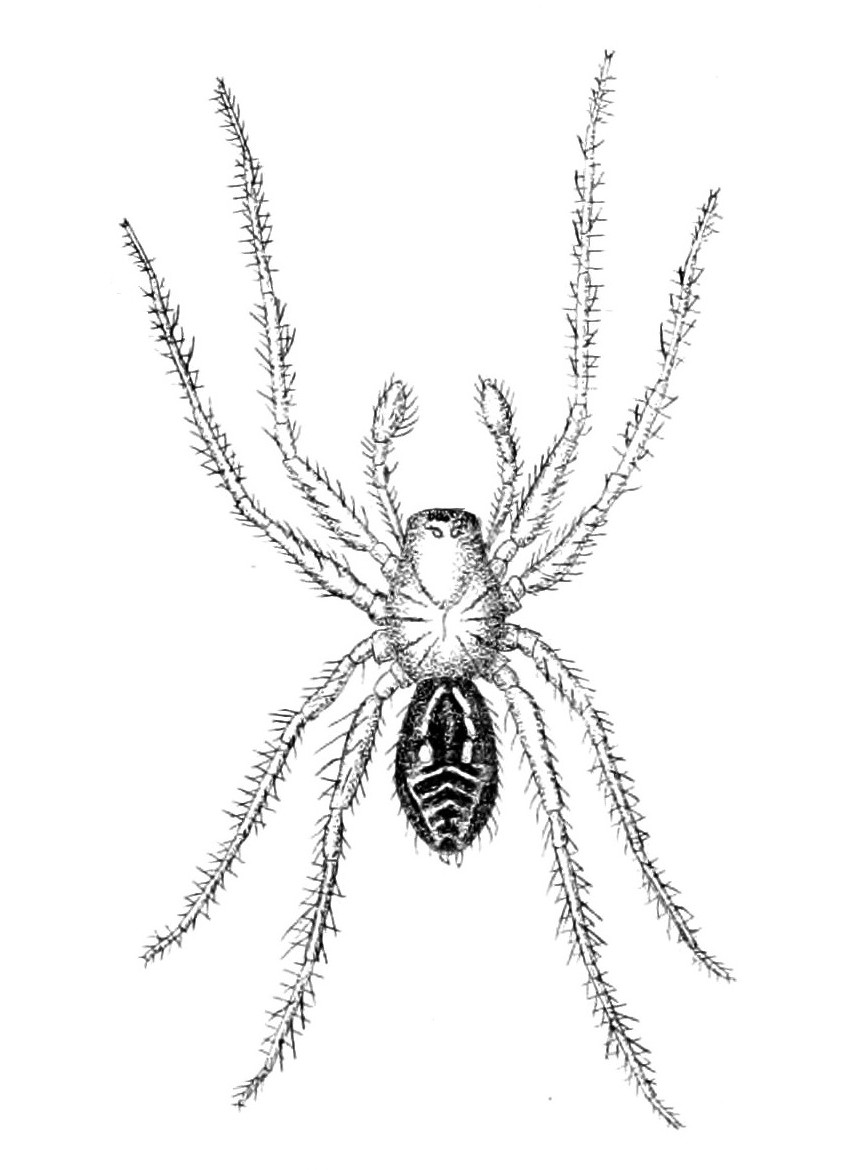
- Myro kerguelenensis

Scientific classification
- Kingdom: Animalia
- Phylum: Arthropoda
- Subphylum: Chelicerata
- Class: Arachnida
- Order: Araneae
- Infraorder: Araneomorphae
- Family: Toxopidae
- Genus: Myro; O. Pickard-Cambridge, 1876

Type species
- M. kerguelenensis O. Pickard-Cambridge, 1876

Species
- 7, see text

= Myro (spider) =

Myro Temporal range: Palaeogene–present

Genus of spiders

Myro is a genus of araneomorph spiders in the family Toxopidae, and was first described by O. Pickard-Cambridge in 1876. Originally placed with the Cybaeidae, it was moved to the intertidal spiders in 1967, and to the Toxopidae in 2017.

== Species ==
As of May 2019 it contains seven species:

- Myro jeanneli Berland, 1947 – Crozet Is.
- Myro kerguelenensis O. Pickard-Cambridge, 1876 (type) – Kerguelen, Macquarie Is.
  - Myro k. crozetensis Enderlein, 1903 – Crozet Is.
- Myro maculatus Simon, 1903 – Australia (Tasmania)
- Myro marinus (Goyen, 1890) – New Zealand
- Myro paucispinosus Berland, 1947 – Marion Is., Crozet Is.
- Myro pumilus Ledoux, 1991 – Crozet Is.
