= Ommatauxesis =

Scientific classification
- Kingdom: Animalia
- Phylum: Arthropoda
- Subphylum: Chelicerata
- Class: Arachnida
- Order: Araneae
- Infraorder: Araneomorphae
- Family: Toxopidae
- Genus: Ommatauxesis; Simon, 1903
- Species: O. macrops

Binomial name
- Ommatauxesis macrops Simon, 1903

Genus of spiders

Ommatauxesis is a monotypic genus of Australian araneomorph spiders in the family Toxopidae containing the single species, Ommatauxesis macrops. It was first described by Eugène Simon in 1903, and has only been found in Australia. Originally placed with the Cybaeidae, it was moved to the intertidal spiders in 1967, and to the Toxopidae in 2017.
