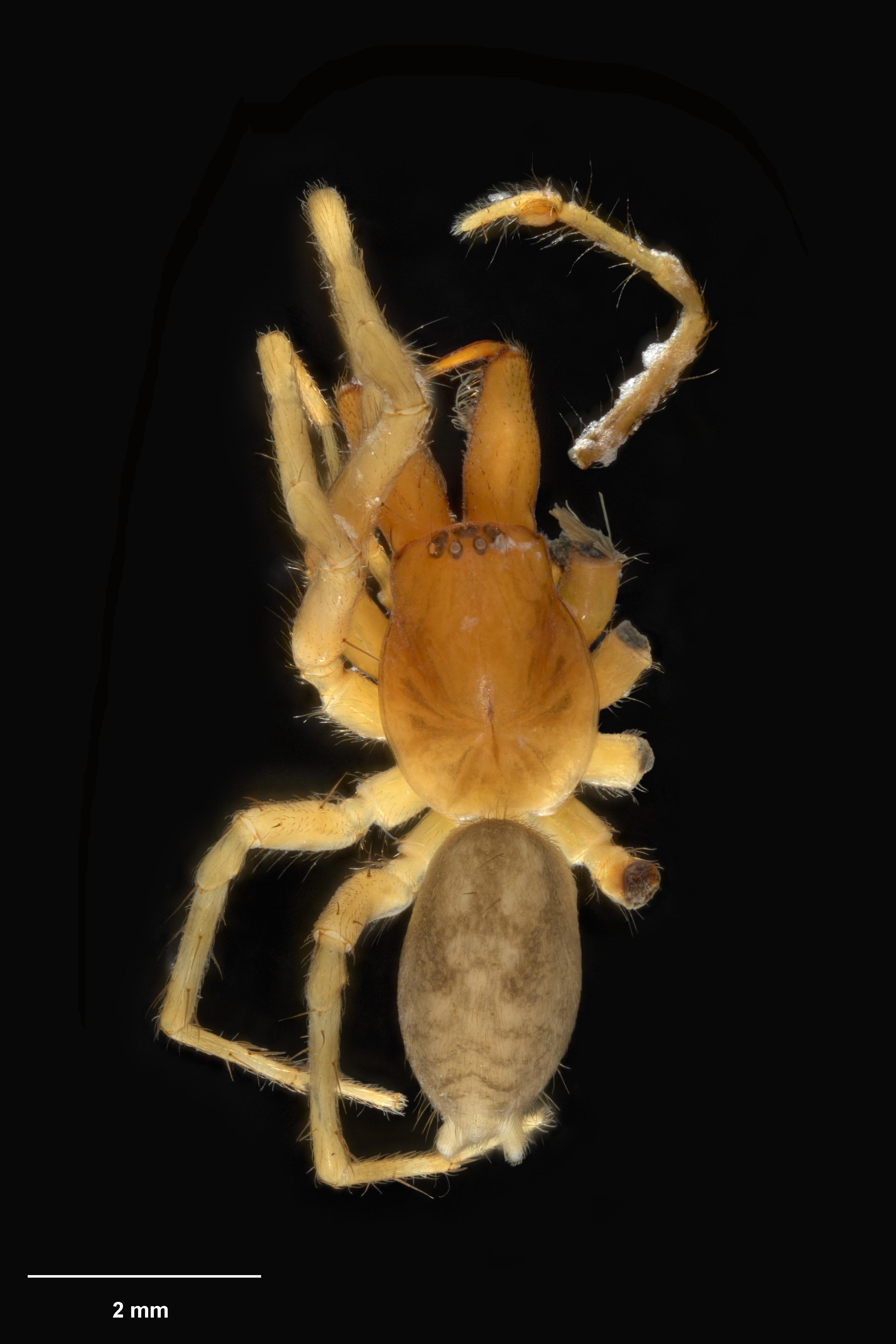
- Gohia clarki

Scientific classification
- Kingdom: Animalia
- Phylum: Arthropoda
- Subphylum: Chelicerata
- Class: Arachnida
- Order: Araneae
- Infraorder: Araneomorphae
- Family: Toxopidae
- Genus: Gohia; Dalmas, 1917

Type species
- G. falxiata (Hogg, 1909)

Species
- 4, see text

= Gohia =

Genus of spiders

Gohia is a genus of South Pacific araneomorph spiders in the family Toxopidae, and was first described by R. de Dalmas in 1917.

== Species ==
As of May 2019 it contains four species, all from New Zealand:

- Gohia clarki Forster, 1964 – New Zealand (Campbell Is.)
- Gohia falxiata (Hogg, 1909) (type) – New Zealand (Auckland Is.)
- Gohia isolata Forster, 1970 – New Zealand
- Gohia parisolata Forster, 1970 – New Zealand
