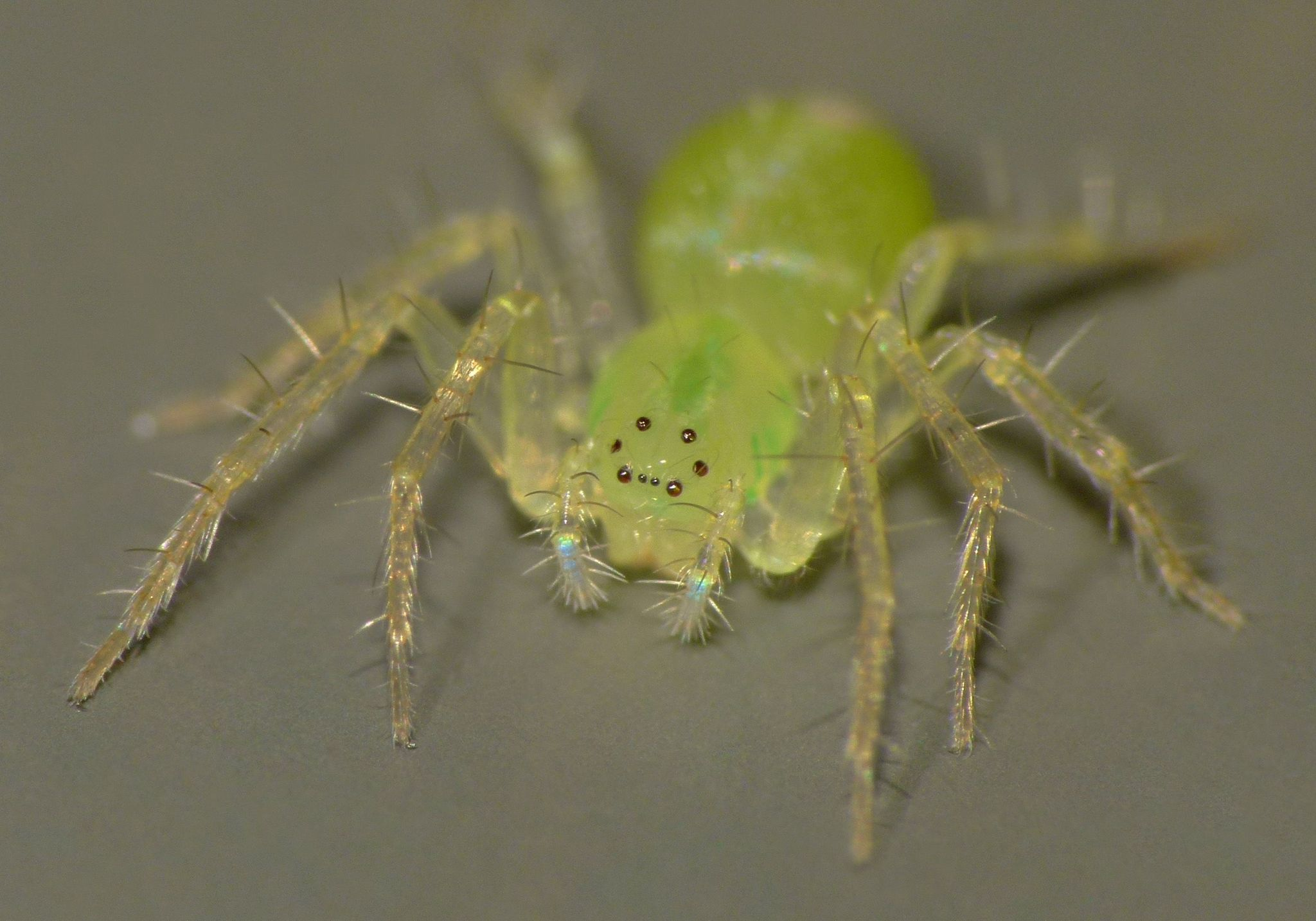
- Lamina minor

Scientific classification
- Domain: Eukaryota
- Kingdom: Animalia
- Phylum: Arthropoda
- Subphylum: Chelicerata
- Class: Arachnida
- Order: Araneae
- Infraorder: Araneomorphae
- Family: Toxopidae
- Genus: Lamina; Forster, 1970

Type species
- L. minor Forster, 1970

Species
- 4, see text

= Lamina (spider) =

Genus of spiders

Lamina is a genus of South Pacific araneomorph spiders in the family Toxopidae, and was first described by Raymond Robert Forster in 1970.

== Species ==
As of May 2019 it contains four species, all found in New Zealand:

- Lamina minor Forster, 1970 (type) – New Zealand
- Lamina montana Forster, 1970 – New Zealand
- Lamina parana Forster, 1970 – New Zealand
- Lamina ulva Forster, 1970 – New Zealand
