= Otagoa =

Scientific classification
- Domain: Eukaryota
- Kingdom: Animalia
- Phylum: Arthropoda
- Subphylum: Chelicerata
- Class: Arachnida
- Order: Araneae
- Infraorder: Araneomorphae
- Family: Toxopidae
- Genus: Otagoa; Forster, 1970

Type species
- O. nova Forster, 1970

Species
- O. chathamensis Forster, 1970 – New Zealand; O. nova Forster, 1970 – New Zealand; O. wiltoni Forster, 1970 – New Zealand

Genus of spiders

Otagoa is a genus of South Pacific araneomorph spiders in the family Toxopidae, and was first described by Raymond Robert Forster in 1970. As of May 2019 it contains only three species, all found in New Zealand: O. chathamensis, O. nova, and O. wiltoni.
