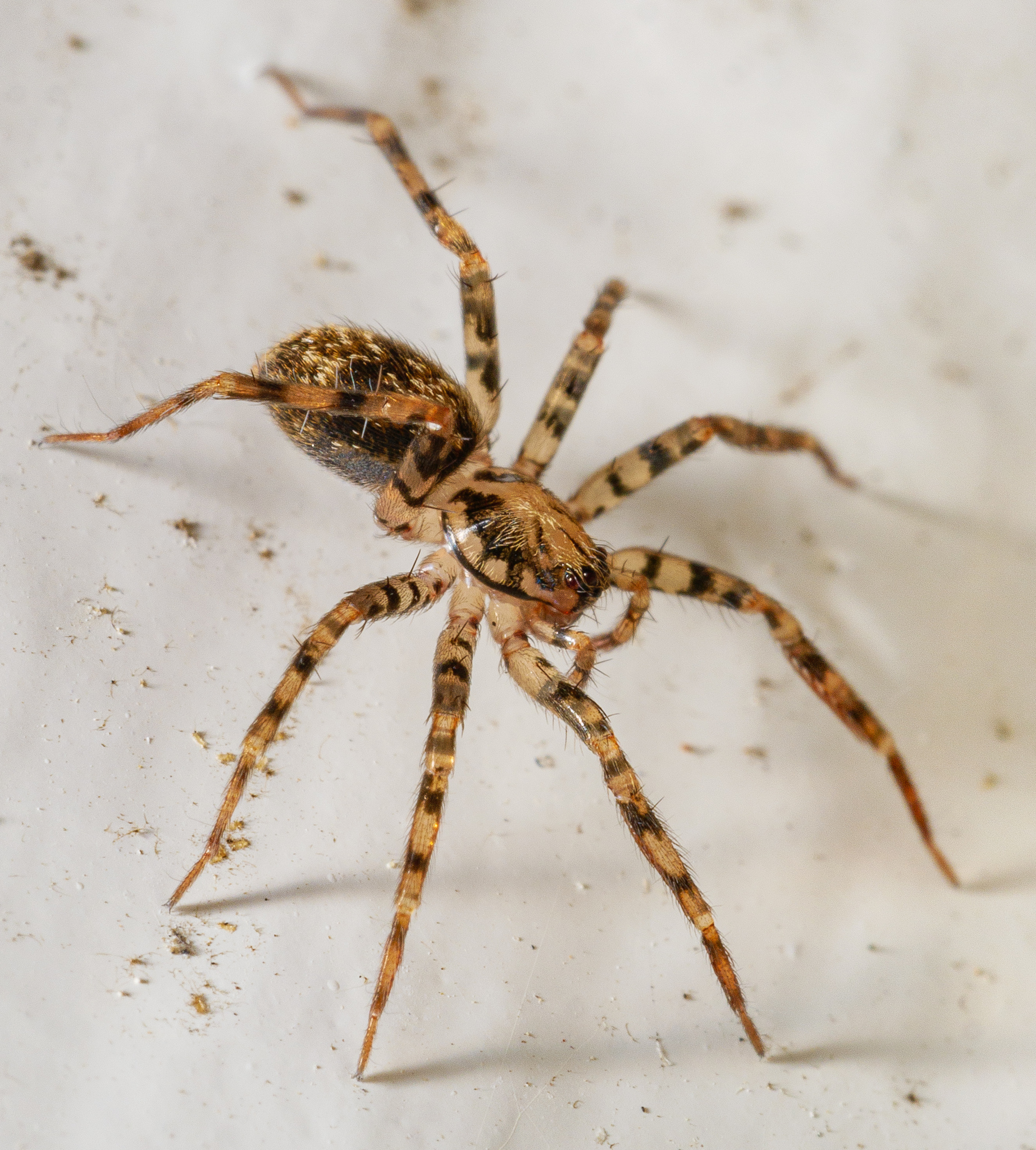
- Toxopsoides huttoni in New Zealand
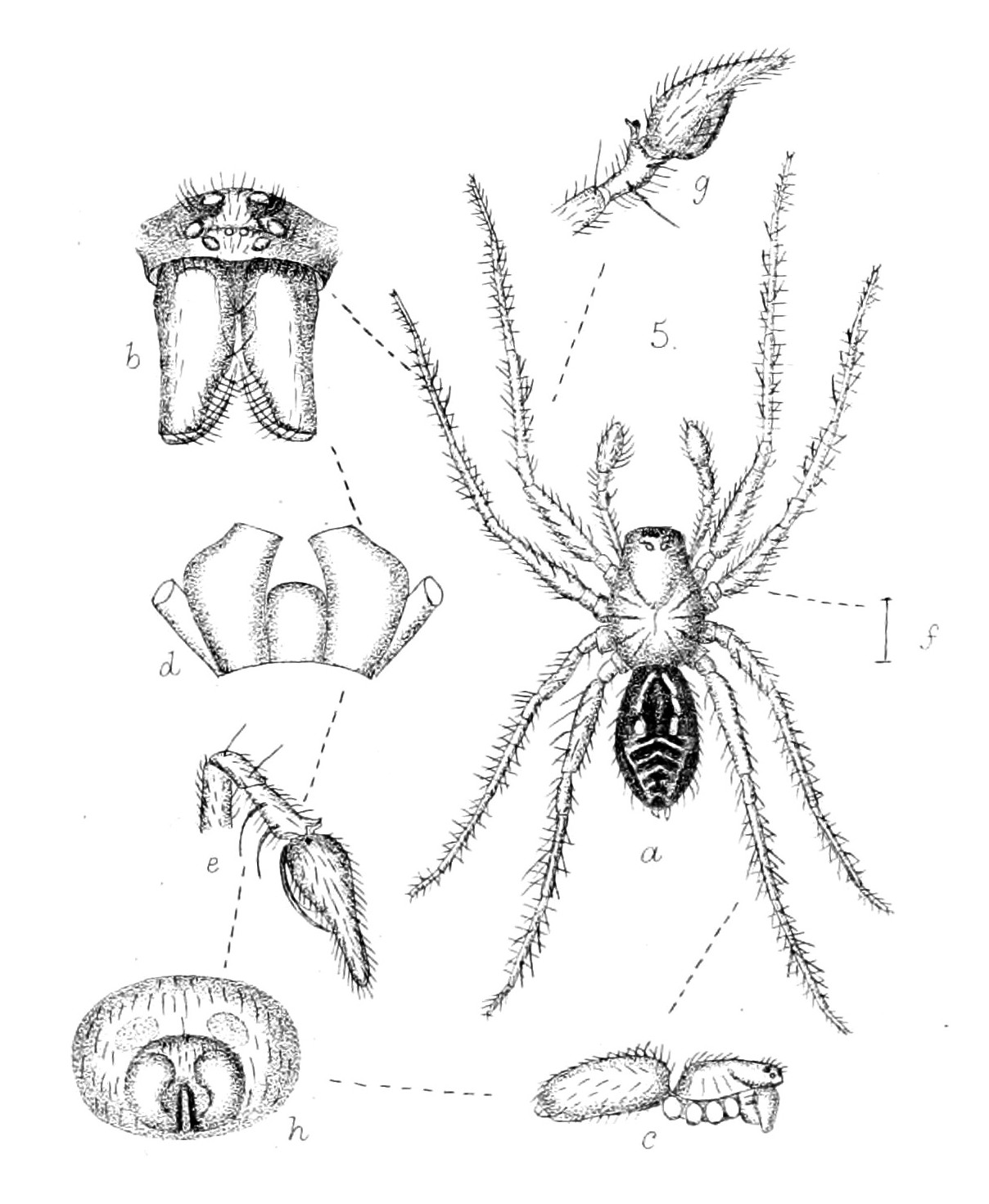
- Myro kerguelenensis

Scientific classification
- Kingdom: Animalia
- Phylum: Arthropoda
- Subphylum: Chelicerata
- Class: Arachnida
- Order: Araneae
- Infraorder: Araneomorphae
- Family: Toxopidae; Hickman, 1940

Diversity
- 14 genera, 82 species
- blue: reported countries (WSC) green: observation hotspots (iNaturalist)

= Toxopidae =

Family of spiders

Toxopidae is a small family of araneomorph spiders, first described in 1940. For many years it was sunk into Desidae as a subfamily, although doubts were expressed as to whether this was correct. A large-scale molecular phylogenetic study in 2016 led to the family being revived.

== Genera ==
As of January 2026, this family includes fourteen genera and 82 species:

- Gasparia Marples, 1956 – New Zealand
- Gohia Dalmas, 1917 – New Zealand
- Hapona Forster, 1970 – New Zealand
- Hulua Forster & Wilton, 1973 – New Zealand
- Jamara Davies, 1995 – Australia
- Laestrygones Urquhart, 1894 – Australia, New Zealand
- Lamina Forster, 1970 – New Zealand
- Midgee Davies, 1995 – Australia
- Myro O. Pickard-Cambridge, 1876 – Australia, New Zealand, Crozet Islands, Kerguelen Islands, Macquarie Islands, Marion Islands
- Neomyro Forster & Wilton, 1973 – New Zealand
- Ommatauxesis Simon, 1903 – Australia
- Otagoa Forster, 1970 – New Zealand
- Toxops Hickman, 1940 – Australia
- Toxopsoides Forster & Wilton, 1973 – Australia, New Zealand
