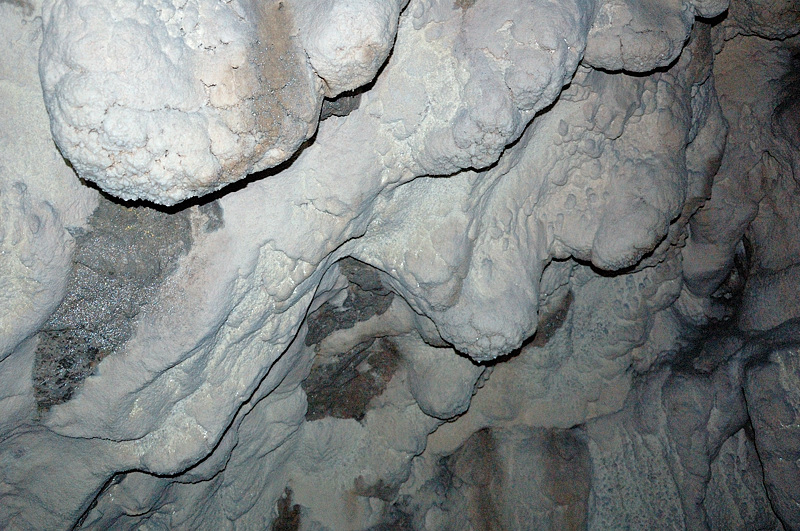
- Moonmilk in the cave Bergmilchkammer

Scientific classification
- Domain: Bacteria
- Kingdom: Pseudomonadati
- Phylum: Pseudomonadota
- Class: Betaproteobacteria
- Order: Burkholderiales
- Family: Comamonadaceae
- Genus: Macromonas
- Species: M. bipunctata

Binomial name
- Macromonas bipunctata (Gicklhorn 1920); Utermöhl and Koppe

= Macromonas bipunctata =

Species of bacterium

Macromonas bipunctata is a Gram-negative, colorless, and heterotrophic sulfur bacterium of the genus Macromonas. It is commonly found in sewage aeration tanks and caves where moonmilk has formed. In the 1920s, researcher Gicklhorn first discovered this organism under the name Pseudomonas bipunctata. After further study and culturing by Utermöhl and Koppe, in 1923, it was later renamed Macromonas bipunctata. This organism is thought to be non-pathogenic species. In fact, the moonmilk produced was referenced as a remedy for infections in the Middle Ages.

== Background ==
=== History ===
In the Middle Ages, "moonmilk" was used as a medicine. People often used it to cure infections and accelerate the healing process. Moonmilk is more than simply Macromonas bipunctata. It also contains populations of cyanobacteria, fungi, green algae, and actinomycetes, which are the main producers of antibiotics. This could explain why it was effective as a potential agent for healing.

=== Etymology ===
M. bipunctata was first isolated by Gicklhorn in the slime of a large basin Gratz in a botanical garden in 1924. Gicklhorn treated this species as a colorless sulfur bacteria and called it Pseudomonas bipunctata. The Greek root "monad/monas" was commonly used for microbiology to indicate a unicellular or single unit organism(s)/bacterium in the 1920s. Furthermore, bipunctata can be separated into the Latin roots "bi", meaning two, and "punctata", meaning spotted, as seen in cultured M. bipunctata.

Years later, Dubinina, Grabovich, and La Rivière isolated this species from the precipitates of sewage aeration tanks called the white mat. Upon more research of this organism, it was renamed Macromonas bipunctata. "Macro" is the Greek term for large, as the cell itself is on average larger than most bacteria. Additionally, this species can also be found in many caves where moonmilk is present.

== Microbiology ==
Macromonas bipunctata is a Gram-negative, aerobic, irregular/pear shaped, heterotrophic sulfur bacterium. M. bipunctata has a very large cell area at 9 μm x 20 μm . Its motility consists of flagella 20–40 μm long that moves around using a structural beam of polar flagella located at one end of its body.

=== Phylogeny and taxonomy ===
The closest species to Macromonas bipunctata within the class Betaproteobacteria are Malikia granosa and Malikia spinosa based on 16S rRNA gene as shown in many previous studies. Malikia nests within the family Comamonadaceae in the phylum Pseudomonadota and is also aerobic. Malikia granosa has a 96.5% similarity to M. bipunctata, whereas Hydrogenophaga flava has a 95.61% similarity in its 16S rRNA gene.

=== Culturing ===
Most of the culturing procedures model Dubinina and Grabovich's 1984 article on M. bipunctata: it includes sodium acetate (1 g/L), calcium chloride (0.1 g/L), casein hydrolysate (0.1g/L), yeast extract (0.1g/L), and agar (1g/L) along with a vitamin supplement, trace elements, and FeS as a sulfide source. M. bipunctata was cultured on an agar plate for 2–3 days at 28 °C (mesophile as optimum for cultivation set at around 28 degrees) before several species of Macromonas bipunctata appeared. The optimal pH level for growing is around 7.2–7.4. The colonies that form produce a white film on the surface of the plate along with flat, finegrained colonies of 1–4 mm diameter. M. bipunctata has a cell area at 9 μm x 20 μm . This species is also pear-shaped, gram-negative and catalase positive.

=== Genomics ===
Many of the studies using M. bipunctata still rely heavily on its morphological characteristics. However, it has been used as a phylogenetic comparison frequently so its 16s rRNA is catalogued: it is 1461 bp. The same study shows that the genome contains 67.6% GC content.

=== Metabolism ===
Macromonas bipunctata has been cultured in many studies that show H_{2}O_{2} is formed in different biochemical reactions: not only in the process of respiration with the participation of enzymes of the electron transport chain, but also in the course of utilization of intracellular oxalate inclusions in the cytoplasm. Oxidation of oxalate inclusions by oxalate oxidase leads to H_{2}O_{2} accumulation. Furthermore, in the end process of becoming a toxic metabolite, it would decompose upon chemical interaction with the reduced sulfur compounds, whose presence is characteristic for the habitat of these bacteria. When grown on the media containing organic acids of the TCA cycle, the unicellular sulfur bacterium M. bipunctata is able to synthesize and store calcium oxalates inside the cell. This process is possible due to the presence of the high oxaloacetate hydrolase activity in M. bipunctata.

The oxalate metabolism throughout different cultures was seen through three different enzymes. One of them leads to the formation of glyoxylate, which may then enter bio-synthetic reactions. The second way implies oxidation of oxalate to CO_{2} via formate, which may be significant in energy metabolism. The third way is oxidation of oxalate by oxalate oxidase.

Furthermore, M. bipunctata was found that reduced sulfur compounds such as H_{2}S were not used by the strains as electron donors, rather, their oxidation was due to interaction with H_{2}O_{2}. This was a main product of O_{2} reduction in respiration. It is assumed that Macromonas bipunctata, at least in part, is responsible for the metabolism of organic acids and calcium deposition in the form of a calcite crystals. This bacterium recently classified as colorless sulfuric bacterium which has the ability to partially oxidize inorganic sulfur compounds.

=== Ecology ===
M. bipunctata lives in several different environments. Other than its communal living in moonmilk formations in certain caves, it was first isolated from a white mat formed in a waste-water. This microorganism is also found as a free-living microbe adapted to high-calcium and high alkaline, freshwater environments.

== Biogeochemical significance ==
Macromonas bipunctata has an indirect connection to the discovery of several antibiotics within the moonmilk formations, but its greatest importance is in its chemical cycling of minerals such as sulfur and calcium in mesophilic environments. This microbe plays a major, holistic role in cycling sulfur through the environment. This bacteria has the ability to precipitate fine crystals of calcite as a byproduct of its activity through calcite inclusions within the cell of the microorganism. It also helps make magnesia crystals and the combination of the two provide the majority of the moonmilk formation that provides a mesophilic environment for several Archaea ad Bacterial phyla that live within the formations.
