= M. spinosa =

M. spinosa may refer to:

- Mahura spinosa, a funnel-web spider species in the genus Mahura
- Malikia spinosa, a Gram-negative soil bacterium species
- Manjala spinosa, a tangled nest spider species in the genus Manjala
- Masteria spinosa, a mygalomorph spider species in the genus Masteria
- Mazax spinosa, a corinnid sac spider species in the genus Mazax
- Moricandia spinosa, a plant species in the genus Moricandia
- Morula spinosa, a mollusc species

== See also ==
- Spinosa (disambiguation)
