= Château Cramirat =

Château in Dordogne, France

- Château de Cramirat
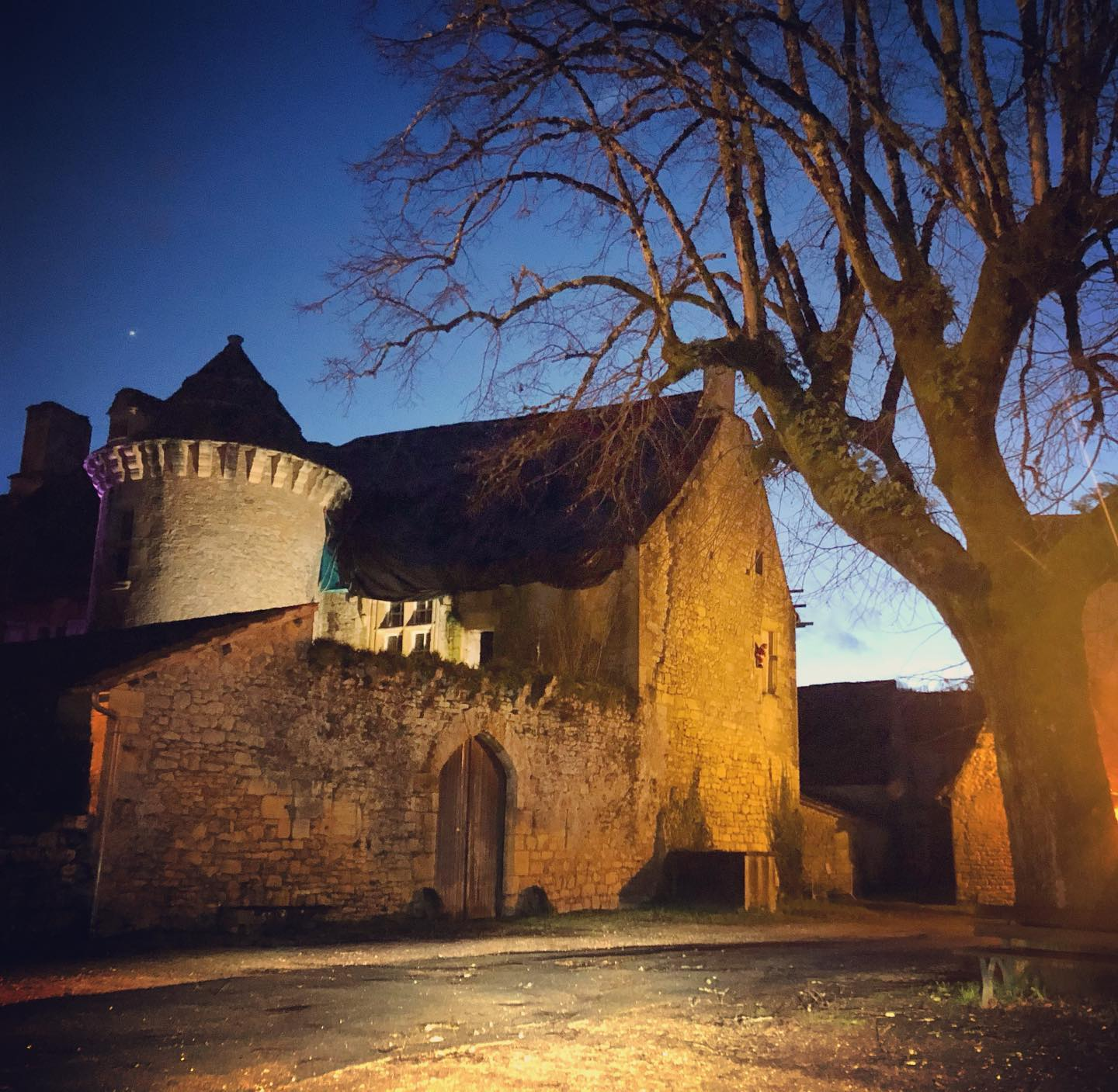
- Château Cramirat
- Interactive map of the Château Cramirat area

General information
- Status: French Historical Monument
- Architectural style: Templar commandery and seat of Grand Master
- Location: 45°00′09″N 1°06′23″E, Sergeac, Dordogne, France
- Construction started: c. 1220

Website
- chateau-cramirat.com

Château Cramirat (or de Cramirat) is a 12th-century Templar castle in the village of Sergeac, Dordogne (Nouvelle-Aquitaine), southwest France. A French national historic monument, the château is situated in the heart of the Vézère river valley, a UNESCO World Heritage Site known as the Valley of Mankind.

== History ==
The castle was built c. 1220 by the Order of the Knights Templar. It served as the order's central commandery in the region and was the home of the grand master of the order in Périgord Noir (Sarladais) until the order was purged in 1307. In 1316, the commander of Sergeac, Guillaume de Crémirac, reinstituted the local community around the area and renamed the castle "Château de Crémirac".

In the Middle Ages, the castle was a key administrative and cultural center of the area, and was one of the main departure points on the Camino de Santiago pilgrimage route, later becoming a pilgrim hospice.

Long before the Templars, the site was a thriving prehistoric settlement, evidenced by the rich concentration of archeological Cro-Magnon rock shelters spread around the area. The wealth of discoveries found in the area suggests exceptionally advanced paleolithic human activity dating back to c. 30,000 BC.

The château was affected by the 16th-century French Wars of Religion, as was the church nearby; both were fortified.

In the late 19th century and up until the 1970s, the place served as an important community center for the local society.

Today, the château is privately owned.

== Location ==
The Château Cramirat is surrounded by landmark sites of immense historical magnitude, such as Castel Merle, Roque Saint-Christophe, the Lascaux caves, and the Abri de la Madeleine, offering insight into the evolution of civilization through ancient cave paintings, figurines, and rock shelters.

The estate itself is situated near an 11th-century church called Église Saint-Pantaléon (formerly, Église Saint Marie) that is recognized as a Templar church, and a 16th-century stone cross, the Croix des Templiers that marks one of the routes on the Camino pilgrimage route to Santiago de Compostela.

== Architecture ==
The château retains the original Romanesque two-story structure, with a rounded machicolated tower overlooking a fortified courtyard.

== Gallery ==
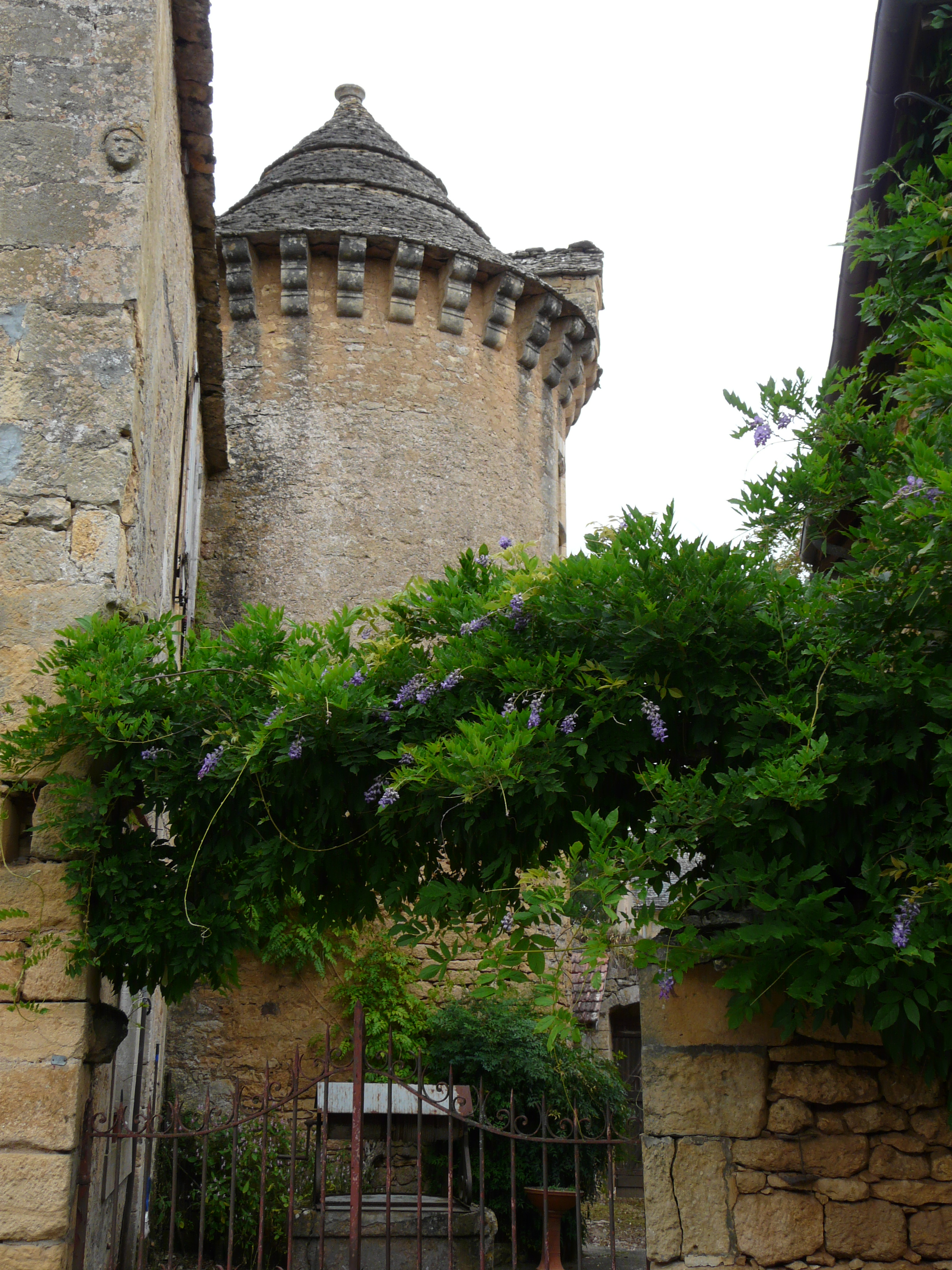
Western entrance and tower

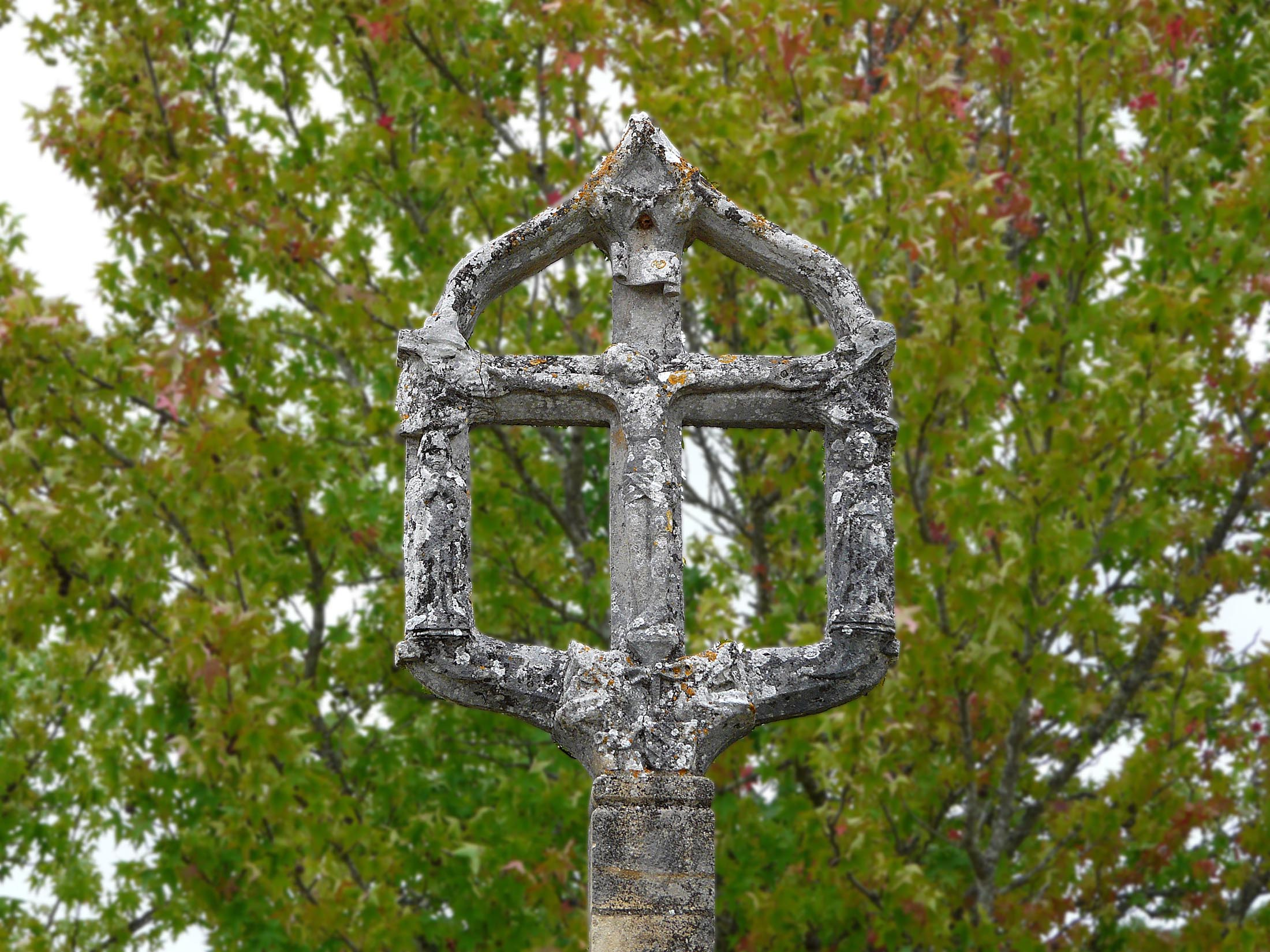
Detail, Croix de Templier

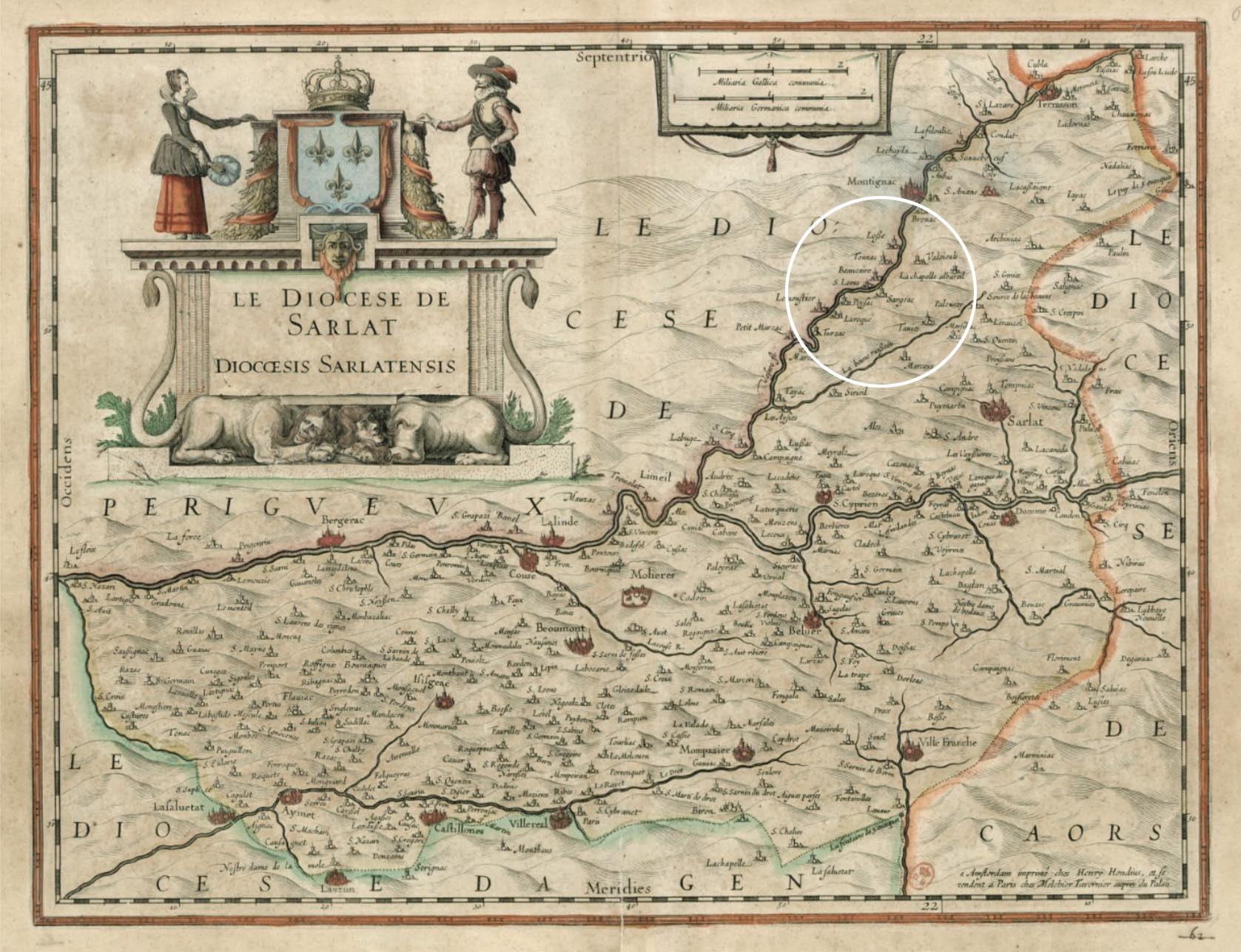
Map of the Valley of Mankind, marking the location of the chateau along the Vezere river

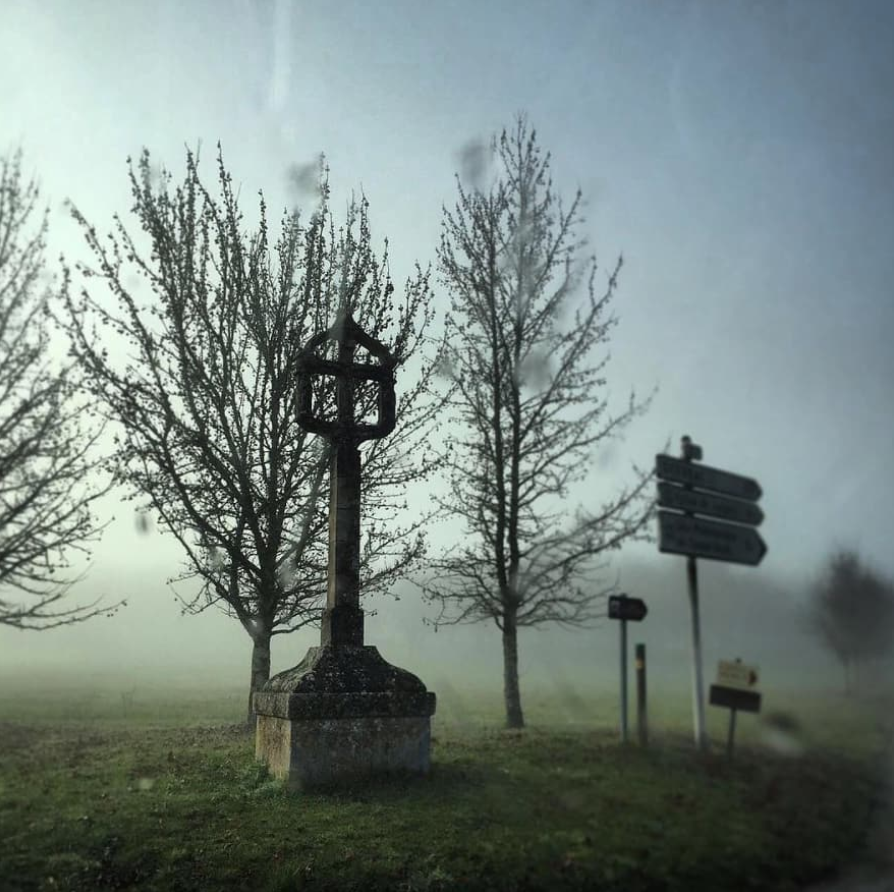
16th-century stone cross, called Croix des Templiers, at the entrance to Sergeac, marking the Camino pilgrimage route to Santiago de Compostela

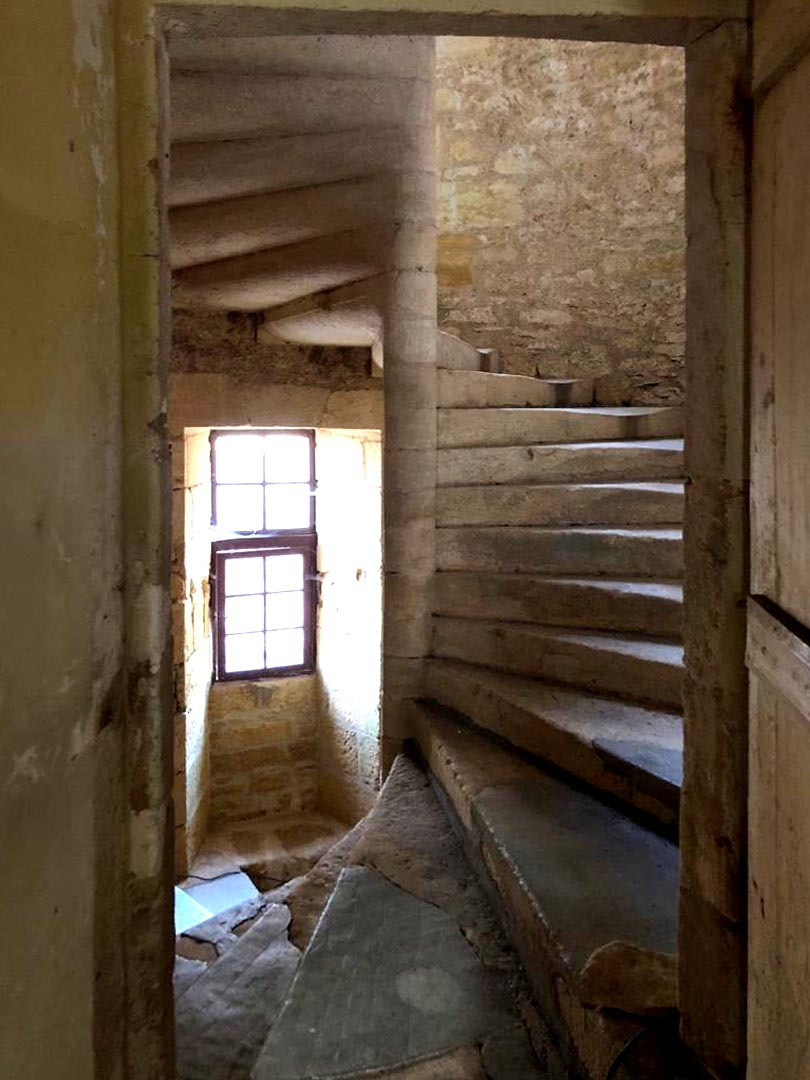
The chateau's main stairwell spirals up three stories high, built of a self-supporting staircase inside the tower

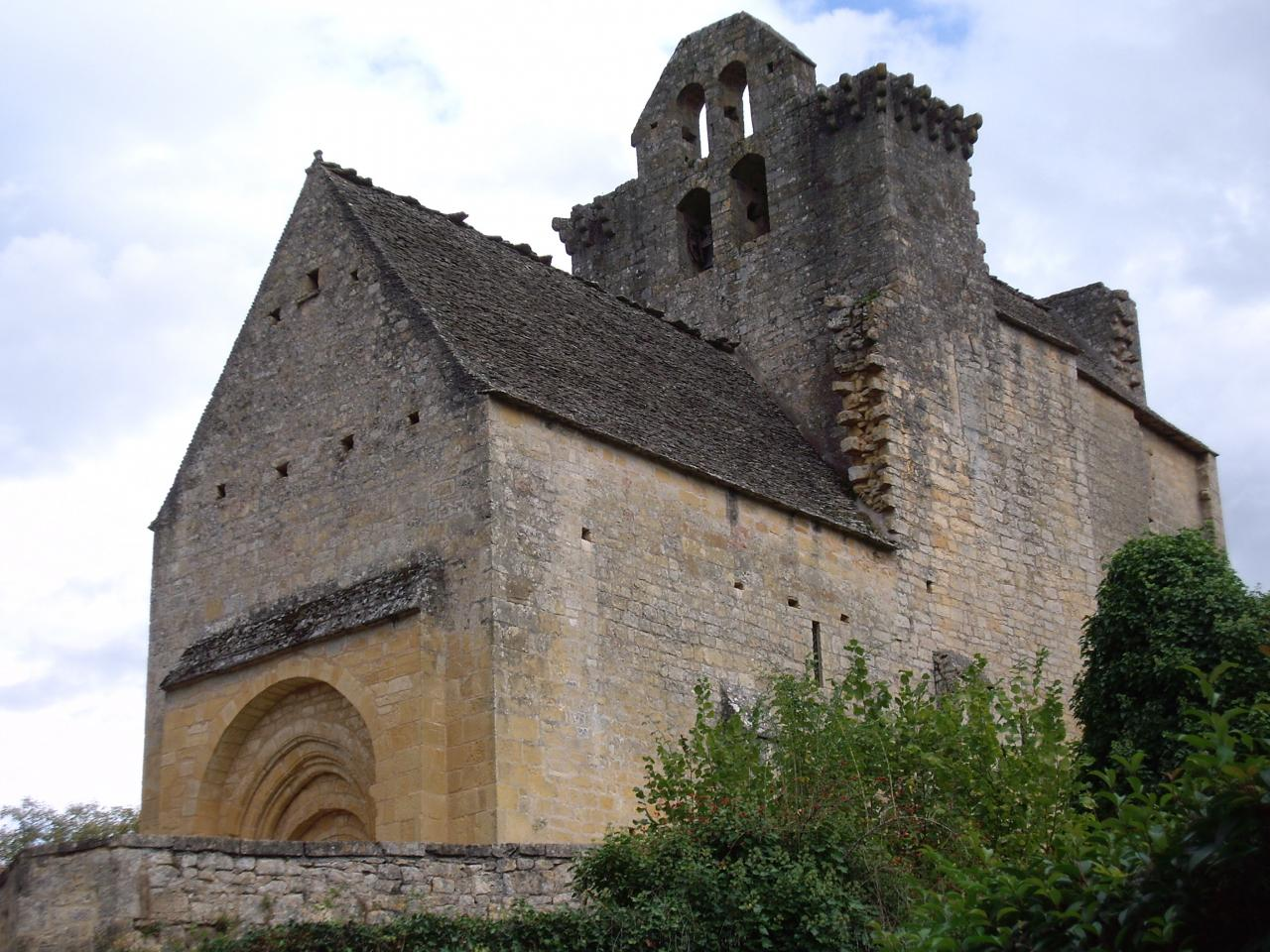
11th-century Église Saint-Pantaléon adjacent to the northern facade of the chateau
