= Reverdit rockshelter =

Paleolithic archaeological site in France

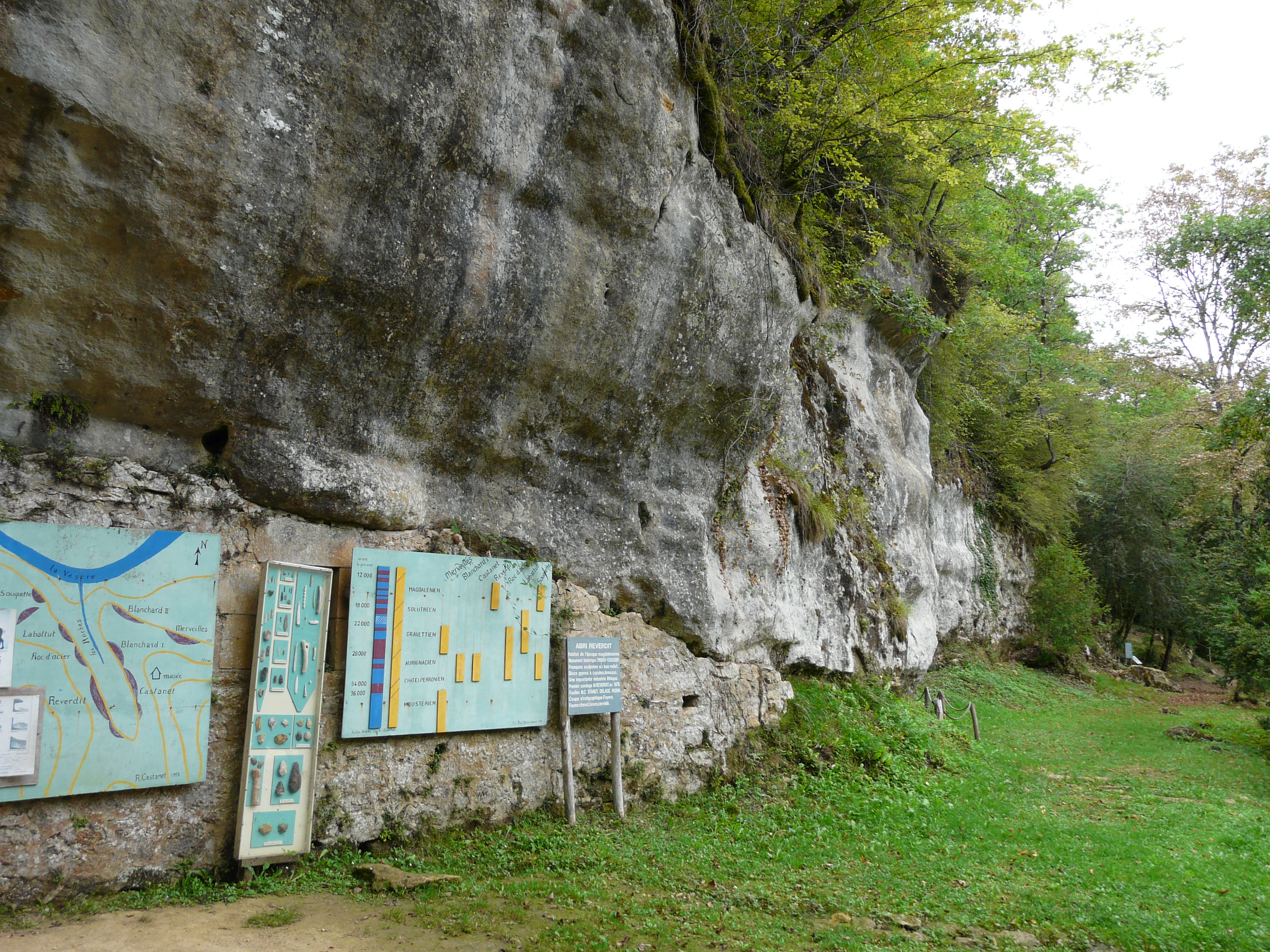

- Location within France
- Location: Sergeac, Dordogne, France
- Coordinates: 44°59′55.4″N 1°06′03.7″E

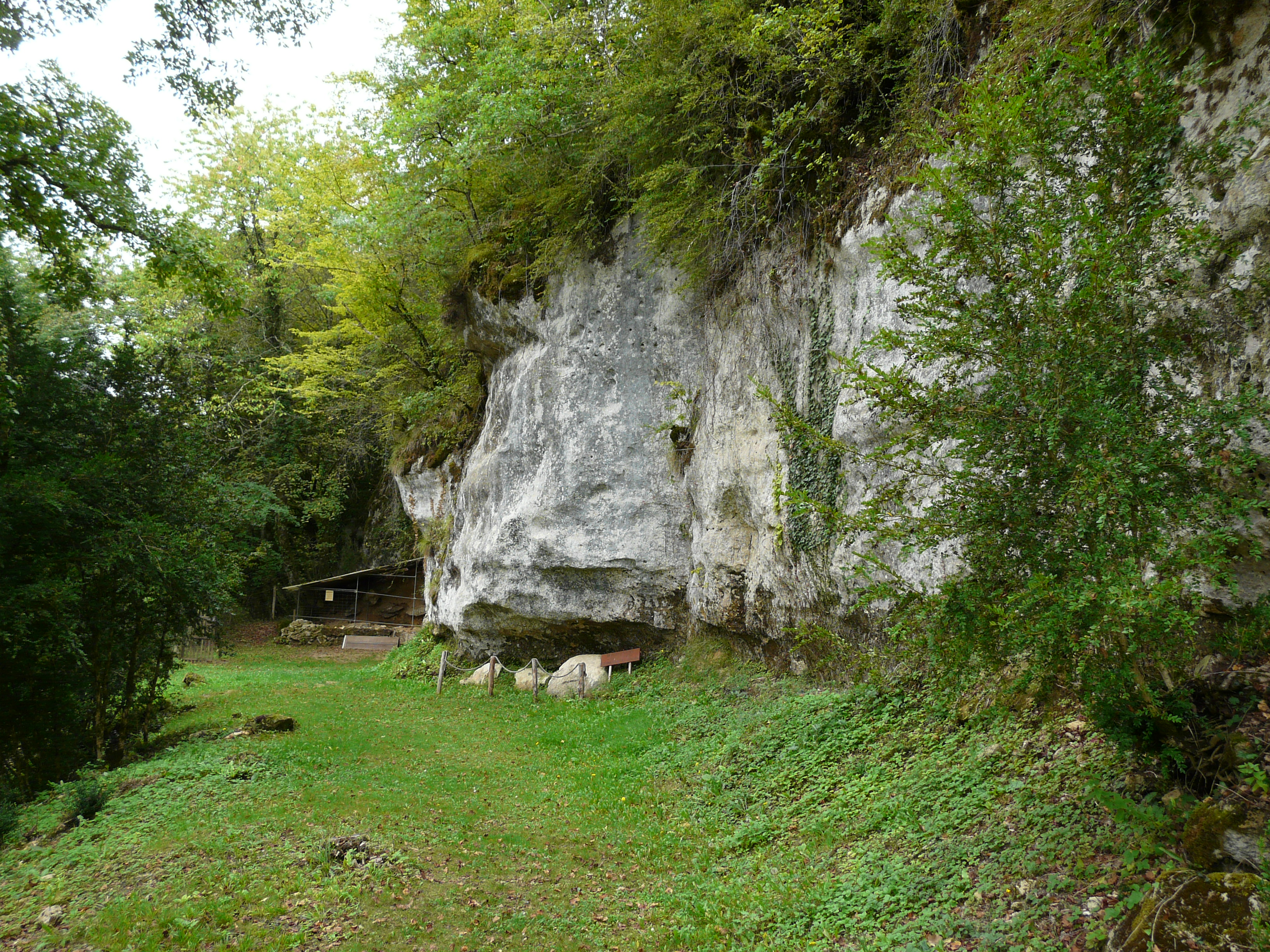
Reverdit rockshelter 2011

The Reverdit rockshelter is a rockshelter with sculpted friezes dating to the Upper Palaeolithic, specifically the Magdelenian. It is situated in the commune of Sergeac, in the Vezere Valley of the Dordogne region in France, close to many other sites with surviving palaeolithic art, including Lascaux Cave. It is part of a complex of 12 rock shelters known as Castel Merle.

== Description ==
The natural shelter is found at the foot of a cliff and faces east. The length of the shelter is 15 m (49 ft) and has a depth of up to 5 m (16 ft) and a height of up to 3 m (9.8 ft). The vault has almost completely collapsed.

== Archaeology ==
The occupation appears to be Magdelenian in nature, some radiocarbon dates suggest long-term occupations between 17 000 and 15 000BP. There appear to be several phases of occupation from the Badegoulian to the Magdelenian but with the most activity during the lower magadelenian.

== Research and Excavation History ==
The shelter was first discovered in 1875 by Alain Reverdit, he then discovered the first frieze in 1878 when he carried out the first excavations. M. Féaux et M. Hardy carried out excavations the following year, followed by M. Castanet in 1909, L. Didon and Denis Peyrony in 1910 and F. Delage between 1911 and 1914, this period of excavation nsaw the discovery of 19 sculptured blocks of stone. A second relief was identified by M Castanet in 1923, which was sketched by the Abbé Henri Breuil. This relief was recorded in 1927 and included in a preliminary publication of the site which was published in 1935 by F. Delage. Andre Leroi-Gourhan published sketches of the site, based on photos, in 1965. From 1985 to 1987 D. Robin and A. Roussot took charge of excavations including reexamining the cuts of previous excavations identifying several hearths. The analyses of the lithics industry was carried out by D. de Sonneville-Bordes and C. Bourdier published a new description of the friezes.

== The Sculptured Friezes ==
The frieze is to be found in the upper section of the rockshelter, about 3.5m long. The first frieze was discovered in the 19th century, the second frieze at the back of the shelter was found by Michel Castanet in 1923. The various excavations have also revealed 19 stone blocks which have been sculpted. Together the friezes show images of animals as well as having abstract markings such as cupules. The level of deterioration of the friezes makes it hard to make out the scenes. There appears to be two horses standing shoulder to shoulder followed by two bison one behind the other. Leroi-Gourhan claimed the head of a carnivore was also visible, and Bourdier identified another possible horse-form, but these last two are not confirmed. The animals on the friezes are all looking towards the Vezere Valley. The stone blocks are degraded but there appear to be numerous cupules and some partial images of bison.

== The Rockshelter Today and Conservation ==
Due to the exposed nature of the site it has suffered some natural deterioration and weathering since the Magdelenian. This includes the formation of Moonmilk, freeze-thaw weathering, damage from vegetation, and the fact that it was used as a shelter by local shepherds at the moment of its discovery. The research on the friezes also contributed to the degradation of the site, as researchers scraped at the edges of the reliefs in order to redefine the edges. The archaeology of the rockshelter floor has also been disturbed due to its removal during successive archaeological excavations which were never consequentially published.

The site was classed as an Historic Monument under French law in 1924 upon the request of L.Capitan and Denis Peyrony and in 1979 the site was included in the UNESCO world heritage list along with all of the palaeolithic sites of the Vézère Valley. The frieze and the overhang have been enclosed in order to better conserve the frieze, the enclosing wall was built in 1924, the same year as its classification
