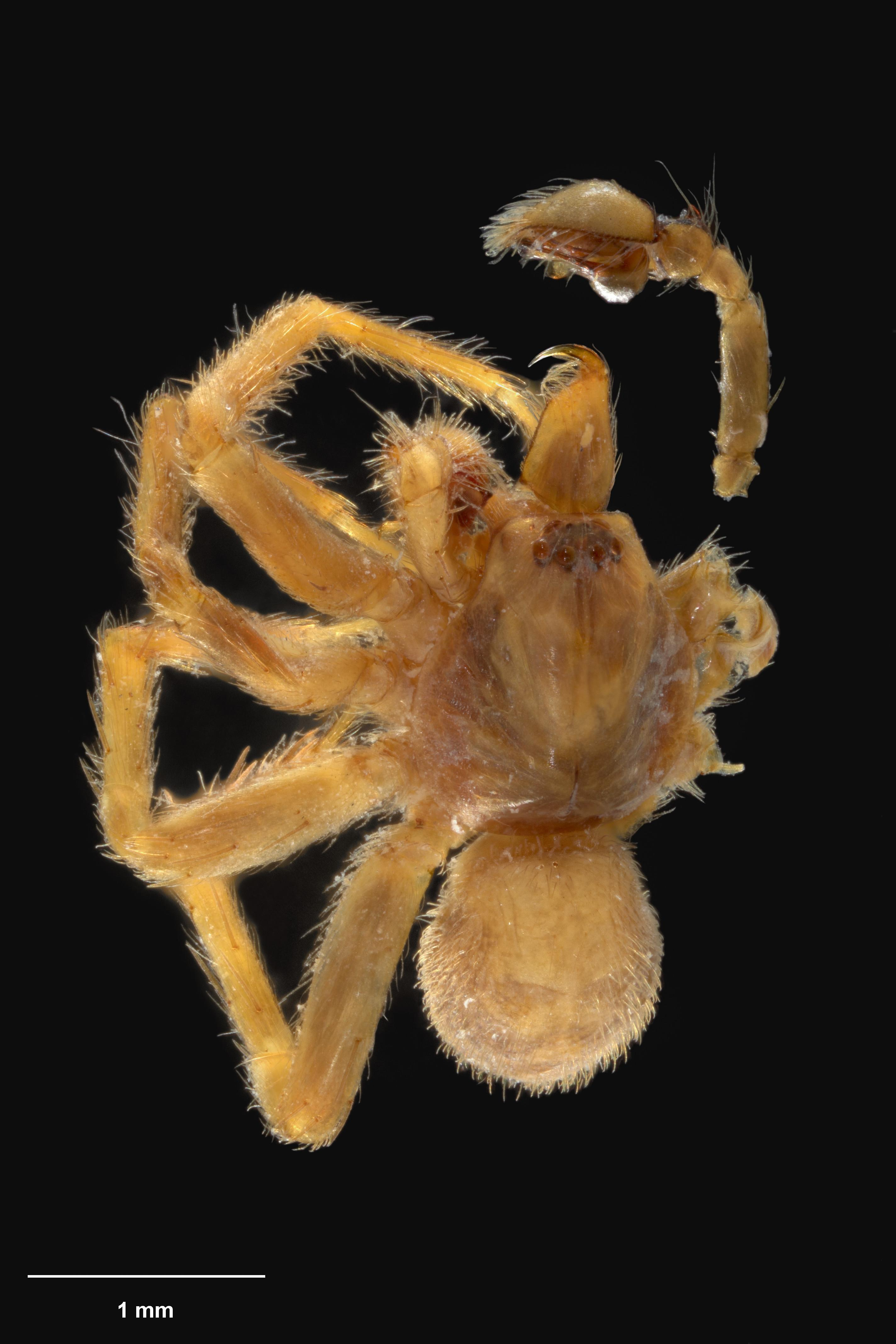

Conservation status
- Data Deficit (NZ TCS)

Scientific classification
- Kingdom: Animalia
- Phylum: Arthropoda
- Subphylum: Chelicerata
- Class: Arachnida
- Order: Araneae
- Infraorder: Araneomorphae
- Family: Agelenidae
- Genus: Mahura
- Species: M. detrita

Binomial name
- Mahura detrita Forster & Wilton, 1973

= Mahura detrita =

Species of spider

Mahura detrita is a species of Agelenidae that is endemic to New Zealand.

== Taxonomy ==
This species was described in 1973 by Ray Forster and Cecil Wilton from male and female specimens. The holotype is stored in Te Papa Museum under registration number AS.000022.

== Description ==
The male is recorded at 3.12mm in length whereas the female is 2.85mm. The carapace and legs are orange brown. The abdomen has a mottled pattern that is coloured yellow brown and grey.

== Distribution ==
This species is only known from Mount Algidus in Canterbury, New Zealand.

== Conservation status ==
Under the New Zealand Threat Classification System, this species is listed as "Data Deficient" with the qualifiers of "Data Poor: Size" and "Data Poor: Trend".
