= Mahura turris =

Conservation status
- Not Threatened (NZ TCS)

Scientific classification
- Kingdom: Animalia
- Phylum: Arthropoda
- Subphylum: Chelicerata
- Class: Arachnida
- Order: Araneae
- Infraorder: Araneomorphae
- Family: Agelenidae
- Genus: Mahura
- Species: M. turris

Binomial name
- Mahura turris Forster & Wilton, 1973

Species of spider

Mahura turris is a species of Agelenidae that is endemic to New Zealand.

== Taxonomy ==
This species was described in 1973 by Ray Forster and Cecil Wilton from male and female specimens. The holotype is stored in Otago Museum.

== Description ==
The female is recorded at 2.64mm in length whereas the male is 2.34mm. The carapace is coloured pale yellow and has black shading. The legs have blackish brown bands. The abdomen is mottled blackish brown and has a pale chevron pattern dorsally.

== Distribution ==
This species is only known from Westland, New Zealand.

== Conservation status ==
Under the New Zealand Threat Classification System, this species is listed as "Not Threatened".
