= Macromonas =

Scientific classification
- Domain: Bacteria
- Kingdom: Pseudomonadati
- Phylum: Pseudomonadota
- Class: Betaproteobacteria
- Order: Burkholderiales
- Family: Comamonadaceae
- Genus: Macromonas; Utermöhl and Koppe 1924, genus.

Type species
- M. mobilis

Genus of bacteria

Macromonas is a genus in the phylum Pseudomonadota (Bacteria).

== Etymology ==
The name Macromonas derives from: : Greek adjective makros (μάκρος), large; Greek feminine gender noun monas (μονάς), nominally meaning "a unit", but in effect meaning a bacterium; Neo-Latin feminine gender noun Macromonas, a large monad. Members of the genus Macromonas can be referred to as macromonad (viz. Trivialisation of names).

== Species ==
The genus contains 2 species (including basonyms and synonyms), namely

- M. bipunctata ( (ex Gicklhorn 1920) Dubinina and Grabovich 1989, nom. rev.;: Latin adv. bis, twice; Latin feminine gender participle adjective puncta (from Latin v. pungo), pricked, punctured; Latin feminine gender suff. -ata, suffix denoting provided with; Neo-Latin feminine gender adjective bipunctata, twice punctate.)
- M. mobilis ( (Lauterborn 1915) Utermöhl and Koppe 1924, species. (Type species of the genus).;: Latin feminine gender adjective mobilis, movable, motile.)

== See also ==
- Bacterial taxonomy
- Microbiology
