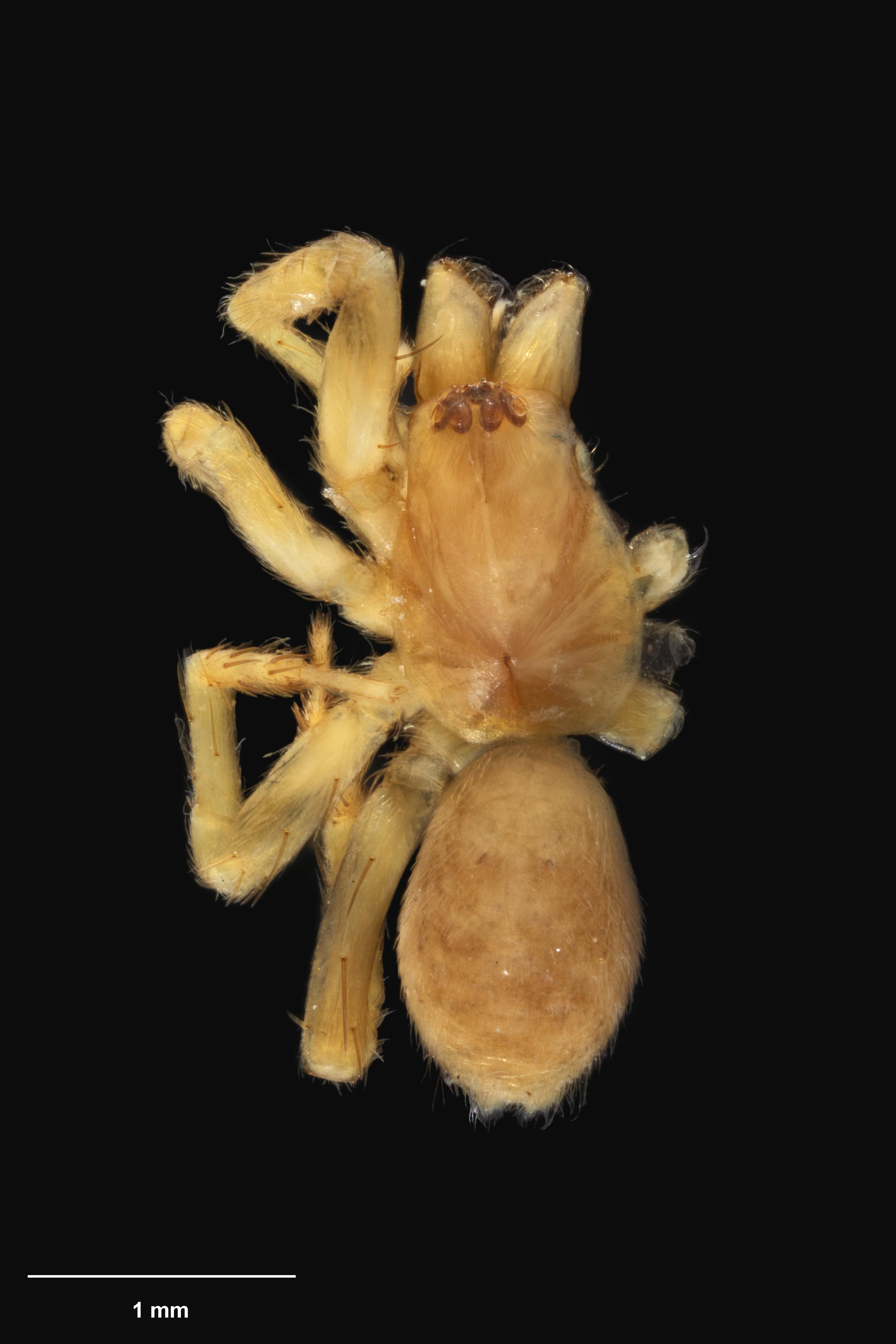

Conservation status
- Data Deficit (NZ TCS)

Scientific classification
- Kingdom: Animalia
- Phylum: Arthropoda
- Subphylum: Chelicerata
- Class: Arachnida
- Order: Araneae
- Infraorder: Araneomorphae
- Family: Agelenidae
- Genus: Mahura
- Species: M. vella

Binomial name
- Mahura vella Forster & Wilton, 1973

= Mahura vella =

Species of spider

Mahura vella is a species of Agelenidae that is endemic to New Zealand.

== Taxonomy ==
This species was described in 1973 by Ray Forster and Cecil Wilton from male and female specimens. The holotype is stored in Te Papa Museum under registration number AS.000122.

== Description ==
The female is recorded at 2.96mm in length. The cephalothorax is coloured orange brown. The legs are yellow brown with darkish bands. The abdomen is pale brown with brown bands dorsally that form a chevron pattern.

== Distribution ==
This species is only known from Nelson, New Zealand.

== Conservation status ==
Under the New Zealand Threat Classification System, this species is listed as "Data Deficient" with the qualifiers of "Data Poor: Size" and "Data Poor: Trend".
