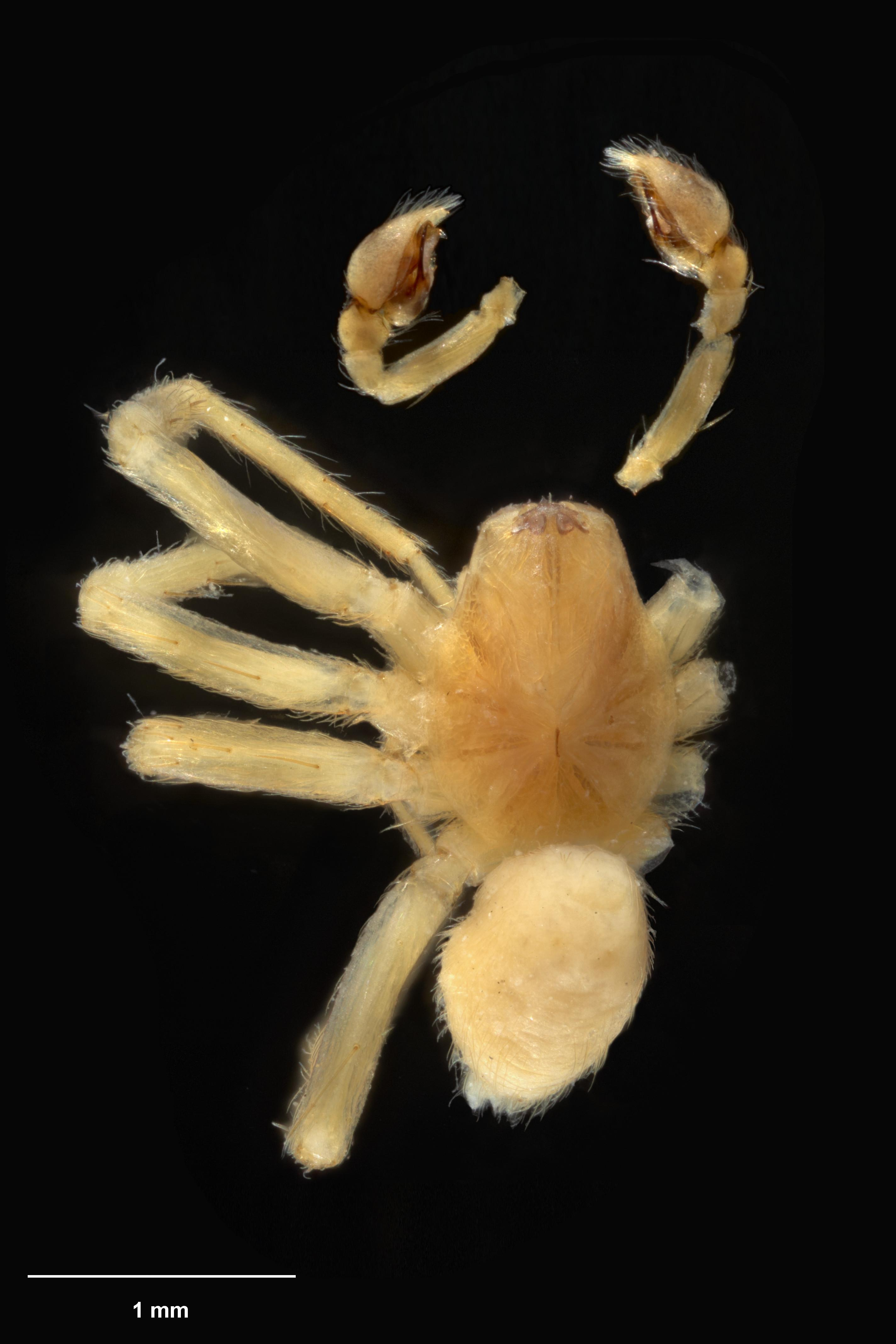

Conservation status
- Data Deficit (NZ TCS)

Scientific classification
- Kingdom: Animalia
- Phylum: Arthropoda
- Subphylum: Chelicerata
- Class: Arachnida
- Order: Araneae
- Infraorder: Araneomorphae
- Family: Agelenidae
- Genus: Mahura
- Species: M. musca

Binomial name
- Mahura musca Forster & Wilton, 1973

= Mahura musca =

Species of spider

Mahura musca is a species of Agelenidae that is endemic to New Zealand.

== Taxonomy ==
This species was described in 1973 by Ray Forster and Cecil Wilton from a male specimen. The holotype is stored in Te Papa Museum under registration number AS.000075.

== Description ==
The male is recorded at 2.56mm in length. The cephalothorax and legs are coloured pale yellow. The abdomen is creamy.

== Distribution ==
This species is only known from Westland, New Zealand.

== Conservation status ==
Under the New Zealand Threat Classification System, this species is listed as "Data Deficient" with the qualifiers of "Data Poor: Size" and "Data Poor: Trend".
