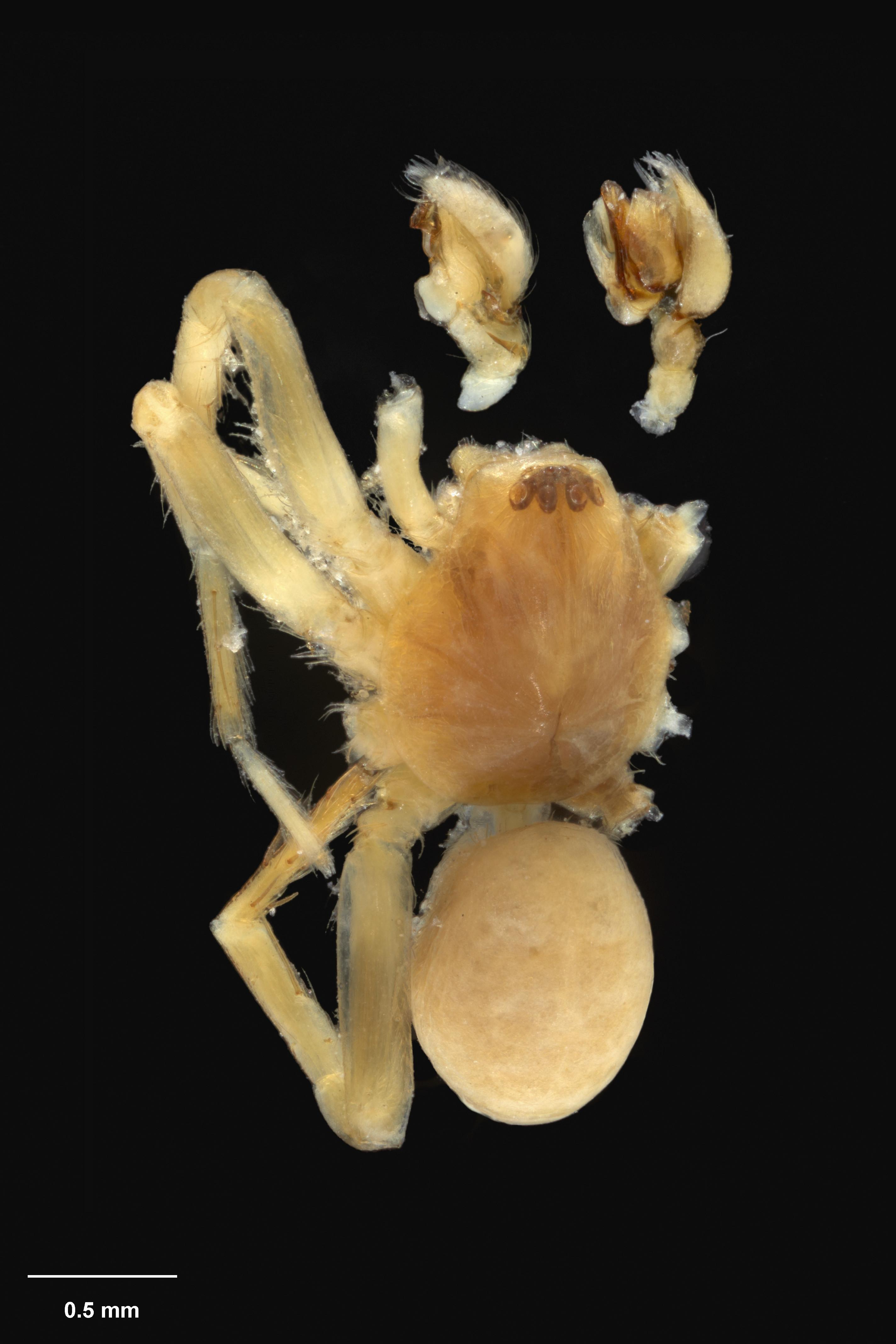

Conservation status
- Data Deficit (NZ TCS)

Scientific classification
- Kingdom: Animalia
- Phylum: Arthropoda
- Subphylum: Chelicerata
- Class: Arachnida
- Order: Araneae
- Infraorder: Araneomorphae
- Family: Agelenidae
- Genus: Mahura
- Species: M. crypta

Binomial name
- Mahura crypta Forster & Wilton, 1973

= Mahura crypta =

Species of spider

Mahura crypta is a species of Agelenidae that is endemic to New Zealand.

== Taxonomy ==
This species was described in 1973 by Ray Forster and Cecil Wilton from male and female specimens. The holotype is stored in Te Papa Museum under registration number AS.000019.

== Description ==
The male is recorded at 2.40mm in length whereas the female is 2.56mm. The overall colour of the spider is reddish brown.

== Distribution ==
This species is only known from Wellington, New Zealand.

== Conservation status ==
Under the New Zealand Threat Classification System, this species is listed as "Data Deficient" with the qualifiers of "Data Poor: Size" and "Data Poor: Trend".
