= Mahura takahea =

Conservation status
- Data Deficit (NZ TCS)

Scientific classification
- Kingdom: Animalia
- Phylum: Arthropoda
- Subphylum: Chelicerata
- Class: Arachnida
- Order: Araneae
- Infraorder: Araneomorphae
- Family: Agelenidae
- Genus: Mahura
- Species: M. takahea

Binomial name
- Mahura takahea Forster & Wilton, 1973

Species of spider

Mahura takahea is a species of Agelenidae that is endemic to New Zealand.

== Taxonomy ==
This species was described in 1973 by Ray Forster and Cecil Wilton from male and female specimens. The holotype is stored in Otago Museum.

== Description ==
The male is recorded at 3.14mm in length whereas the female is 2.90mm. The male cephalothorax is pale yellow with darkish bands. The legs are pale yellow brown. The abdomen is creamy and shaded reddish brown. The female differs in being more darkly coloured. It also has pale markings dorsally.

== Distribution ==
This species is only known from Fiordland, New Zealand.

== Conservation status ==
Under the New Zealand Threat Classification System, this species is listed as "Data Deficient" with the qualifiers of "Data Poor: Size" and "Data Poor: Trend".
