= Mahura rubella =

Conservation status
- Data Deficit (NZ TCS)

Scientific classification
- Kingdom: Animalia
- Phylum: Arthropoda
- Subphylum: Chelicerata
- Class: Arachnida
- Order: Araneae
- Infraorder: Araneomorphae
- Family: Agelenidae
- Genus: Mahura
- Species: M. rubella

Binomial name
- Mahura rubella Forster & Wilton, 1973

Species of spider

Mahura rubella is a species of Agelenidae that is endemic to New Zealand.

== Taxonomy ==
This species was described in 1973 by Ray Forster and Cecil Wilton from a female specimen. The holotype is stored in Otago Museum.

== Description ==
The female is recorded at 2.90mm in length. The carapace is coloured pale cream with some dark shading. The legs are pale and have dark markings. The abdomen is brownish grey with a reddish band dorsally.

== Distribution ==
This species is only known from Stewart Island, New Zealand.

== Conservation status ==
Under the New Zealand Threat Classification System, this species is listed as "Data Deficient" with the qualifiers of "Data Poor: Size" and "Data Poor: Trend".
