= Mahura scuta =

Conservation status
- Not Threatened (NZ TCS)

Scientific classification
- Kingdom: Animalia
- Phylum: Arthropoda
- Subphylum: Chelicerata
- Class: Arachnida
- Order: Araneae
- Infraorder: Araneomorphae
- Family: Agelenidae
- Genus: Mahura
- Species: M. scuta

Binomial name
- Mahura scuta Forster & Wilton, 1973

Species of spider

Mahura scuta is a species of Agelenidae spider that is endemic to New Zealand.

== Taxonomy ==
This species was described in 1973 by Ray Forster and Cecil Wilton from female specimens.

== Description ==
The female is recorded at 2.58mm in length. The cephalothorax and legs are coloured yellow brown. The abdomen is creamy with black shading.

== Distribution ==
This species is only known from the South Island of New Zealand.

== Conservation status ==
Under the New Zealand Threat Classification System, this species is listed as "Not Threatened".
