= Mahura spinosoides =

Conservation status
- Data Deficit (NZ TCS)

Scientific classification
- Kingdom: Animalia
- Phylum: Arthropoda
- Subphylum: Chelicerata
- Class: Arachnida
- Order: Araneae
- Infraorder: Araneomorphae
- Family: Agelenidae
- Genus: Mahura
- Species: M. spinosoides

Binomial name
- Mahura spinosoides Forster & Wilton, 1973

Species of spider

Mahura spinosoides is a species of Agelenidae that is endemic to New Zealand.

== Taxonomy ==
This species was described in 1973 by Ray Forster and Cecil Wilton from female specimens. The holotype is stored in Otago Museum.

== Description ==
The female is recorded at 2.80mm in length. The carapace is coloured pale creamy brown and has various markings. The legs are similarly coloured. The abdomen is shaded brownish grey and has pale flecks.

== Distribution ==
This species is only known from Fiordland, New Zealand.

== Conservation status ==
Under the New Zealand Threat Classification System, this species is listed as "Data Deficient" with the qualifiers of "Data Poor: Size" and "Data Poor: Trend".
