= Mahura spinosa =

Conservation status
- Not Threatened (NZ TCS)

Scientific classification
- Kingdom: Animalia
- Phylum: Arthropoda
- Subphylum: Chelicerata
- Class: Arachnida
- Order: Araneae
- Infraorder: Araneomorphae
- Family: Agelenidae
- Genus: Mahura
- Species: M. spinosa

Binomial name
- Mahura spinosa Forster & Wilton, 1973

Species of spider

Mahura spinosa is a species of Agelenidae that is endemic to New Zealand.

== Taxonomy ==
This species was described in 1973 by Ray Forster and Cecil Wilton from male and female specimens. The holotype is stored in Otago Museum.

== Description ==
The male is recorded at 3.06mm in length whereas the female is 3.18mm. The cephalothorax is coloured pale orange brown and has dark shading. The legs are pale yellow. The abdomen is creamy and mottled dark brown.

== Distribution ==
This species is only known from Fiordland, New Zealand.

== Conservation status ==
Under the New Zealand Threat Classification System, this species is listed as "Not Threatened".
