= Malikia =

Scientific classification
- Domain: Bacteria
- Kingdom: Pseudomonadati
- Phylum: Pseudomonadota
- Class: Betaproteobacteria
- Order: Burkholderiales
- Family: Comamonadaceae
- Genus: Malikia; Spring et al. 2005

Type species
- Malikia granosa

Species
- Malikia granosa Malikia spinosa

Genus of bacteria

Malikia is a genus of Gram-negative bacteria.
