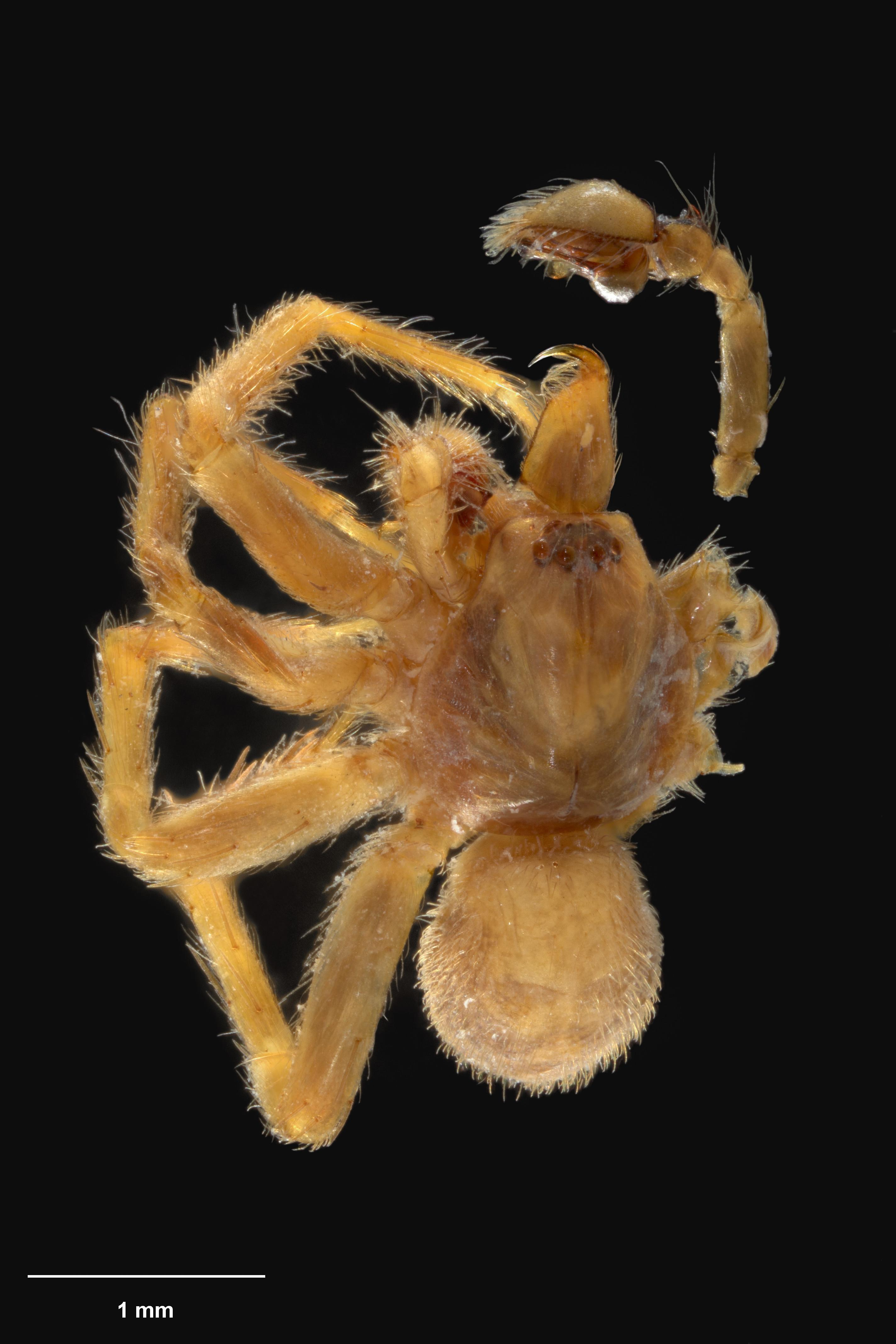
- Mahura detrita holotype specimen

Scientific classification
- Kingdom: Animalia
- Phylum: Arthropoda
- Subphylum: Chelicerata
- Class: Arachnida
- Order: Araneae
- Infraorder: Araneomorphae
- Family: Agelenidae
- Genus: Mahura; Forster & Wilton, 1973

Type species
- M. turris Forster & Wilton, 1973

Species
- 18, see text

= Mahura =

Genus of spiders

Mahura is a genus of South Pacific funnel weavers first described by Raymond Robert Forster & C. L. Wilton in 1973 and known only from New Zealand. They are fairly common, though small spiders, ranging from 1.5 to 3.5 millimetres (0.059 to 0.138 in) long.

== Species ==
As of October 2026 it contains eighteen species:

- Mahura accola Forster & Wilton, 1973 — New Zealand
- Mahura bainhamensis Forster & Wilton, 1973 — New Zealand
- Mahura boara Forster & Wilton, 1973 — New Zealand
- Mahura crypta Forster & Wilton, 1973 — New Zealand
- Mahura detrita Forster & Wilton, 1973 — New Zealand
- Mahura hinua Forster & Wilton, 1973 — New Zealand
- Mahura musca Forster & Wilton, 1973 — New Zealand
- Mahura rubella Forster & Wilton, 1973 — New Zealand
- Mahura rufula Forster & Wilton, 1973 — New Zealand
- Mahura scuta Forster & Wilton, 1973 — New Zealand
- Mahura sorenseni Forster & Wilton, 1973 — New Zealand
- Mahura southgatei Forster & Wilton, 1973 — New Zealand
- Mahura spinosa Forster & Wilton, 1973 — New Zealand
- Mahura spinosoides Forster & Wilton, 1973 — New Zealand
- Mahura takahea Forster & Wilton, 1973 — New Zealand
- Mahura tarsa Forster & Wilton, 1973 — New Zealand
- Mahura turris Forster & Wilton, 1973 — New Zealand
- Mahura vella Forster & Wilton, 1973 — New Zealand
