= Moonmilk =

Creamy, cave-crystallized carbonates

Moonmilk Mondmilch, Montmilch, Cave milk
- Speleothem rock
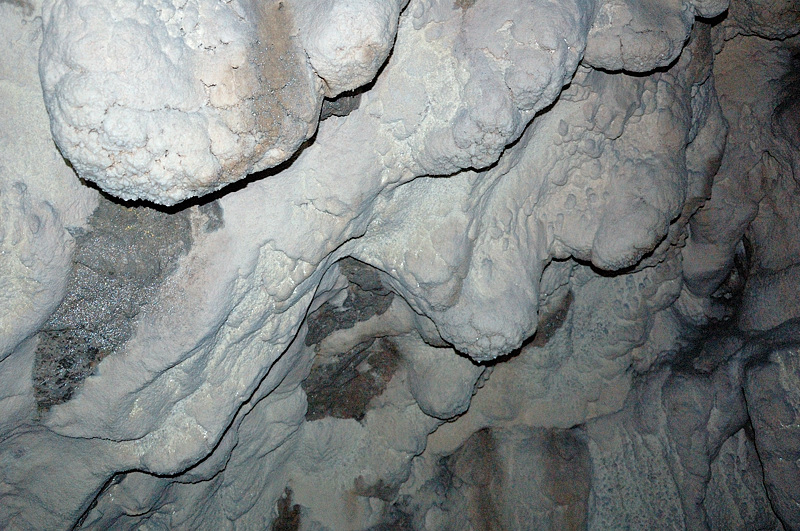
- Moonmilk ostensibly created from Macromonas bipunctata in the cave Bergmilchkammer

Composition
- Carbonates (e.g., calcite, aragonite, hydromagnesite, monohydrocalcite)
- Texture: Creamy, soft

Diagram of dripstone cave structures (moonmilk is labelled I)

Moonmilk (sometimes called mondmilch, also known as bergmilch, montmilch, or cave milk) is a white, creamy substance found inside limestone, dolomite, and possibly other types of caves. It is a precipitate from limestone comprising aggregates of fine crystals of varying composition, usually made of carbonates such as calcite, aragonite, hydromagnesite, and/or monohydrocalcite.

== Formation and composition ==
Moonmilk forms as a result of several processes, including both chemical reactions and possible bacterial action. One hypothesis suggests that moonmilk is created by the bacterium Macromonas bipunctata. However, no microbiological studies have been carried out to confirm this. Moonmilk was originally thought to be created by moon rays, a misconception reflected in its name.

It is possible that moonmilk forms when water dissolves and softens the karst in caves, carrying dissolved nutrients that are used by microbes, such as Actinomycetes. As microbial colonies grow, they trap and accumulate chemically precipitated crystals in an organic matter-rich matrix. These heterotrophic microbes, which produce CO_{2} as a waste product of respiration and possibly organic acids, may help to dissolve the carbonate.

== Historical and cultural uses ==
In 2017, archaeologists at the University of Chinese Academy of Sciences in China discovered a bronze jar dating back over 2,700 years, containing animal fat combined with moonmilk. This mixture is believed to have been used as a cosmetic face cream by Chinese noblemen.

Being soft, moonmilk was frequently used as a medium for finger fluting, a form of prehistoric art.

The Swiss naturalist Conrad Gessner described moonmilk's use as a medicine in the 16th century. It continued to be prescribed until the 19th century.

== Notable formations ==
The world's largest formation of brushite moonmilk is found in the Big Room of Kartchner Caverns State Park in southern Arizona.
