= Malikia granosa =

Scientific classification
- Domain: Bacteria
- Kingdom: Pseudomonadati
- Phylum: Pseudomonadota
- Class: Betaproteobacteria
- Order: Burkholderiales
- Family: Comamonadaceae
- Genus: Malikia
- Species: M. granosa

Binomial name
- Malikia granosa Spring et al. 2005

Type strain
- CIP 108194, DSM 15619, JCM 12706, P1

Species of bacterium

Malikia granosa is a Gram-negative, rod-shaped, motile bacterium with one to two polar flagella from the new genus Malikia in family Comamonadaceae. It was isolated from activated sludge of a municipal wastewater treatment plant. Colonies of M. granosa are creamy–white in color.
