= Castel Merle =

Archaeological site in Nouvelle-Aquitaine, France

Coordinates: 45.000°N 1.101°E

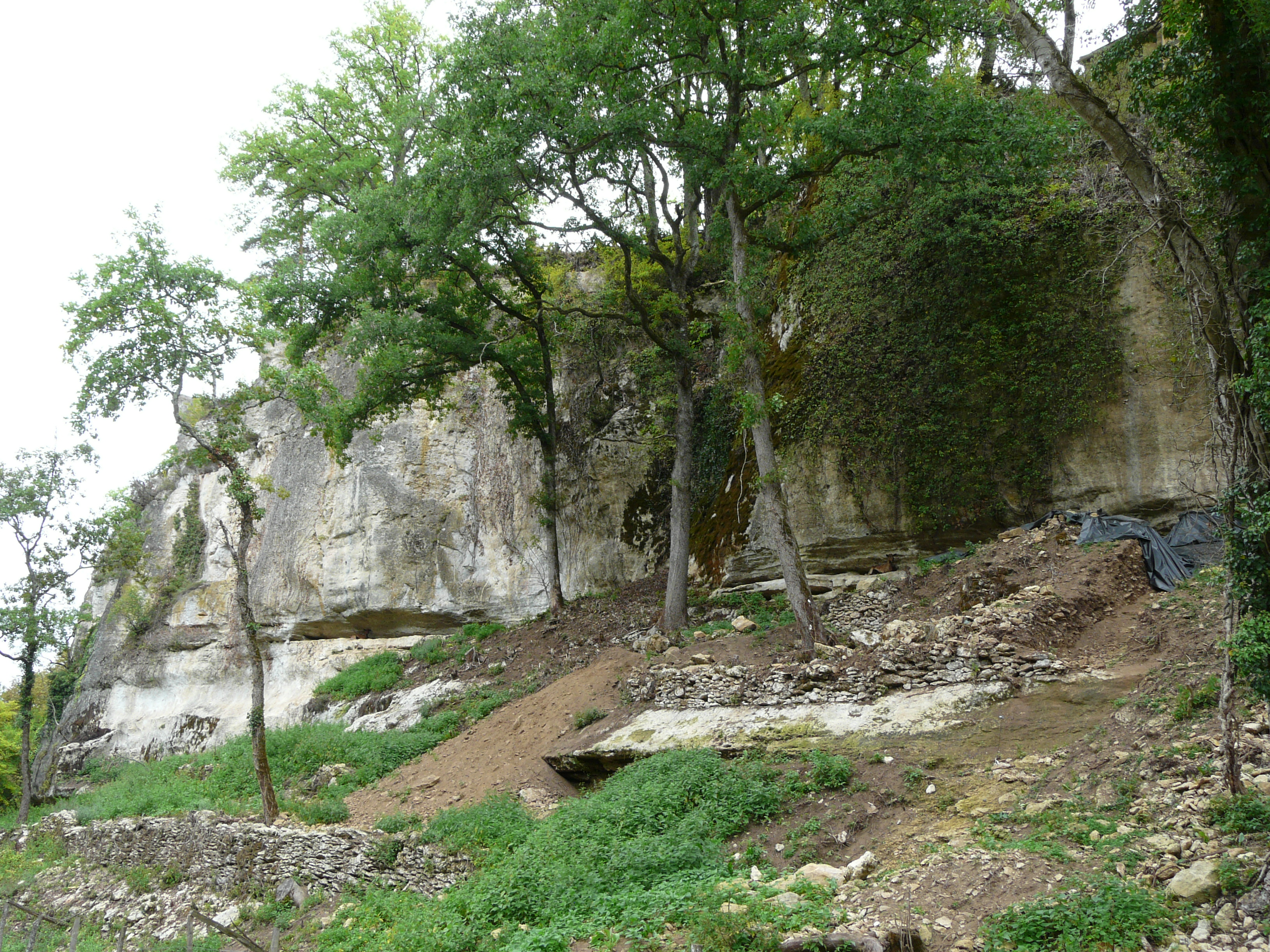
Rock face on the side of Castel merle, showing the Blanchard shelter during excavations in 2011

Castel Merle (also known as Castel-Merle or Castelmerle) is a complex of ten prehistoric rock shelters (French: abris) in Sergeac, in the Dordogne department of France. It is close to the Lascaux rock art caves and is situated in the region which forms the Unesco World Heritage site Prehistoric Sites and Decorated Caves of the Vézère Valley, but is not officially a part of it. The finds in the shelters date to the Mousterian and Magdalenian periods, between 160,000 and 12,000 years ago. The most important of the ten shelters is the Reverdit rockshelter.

== Importance ==
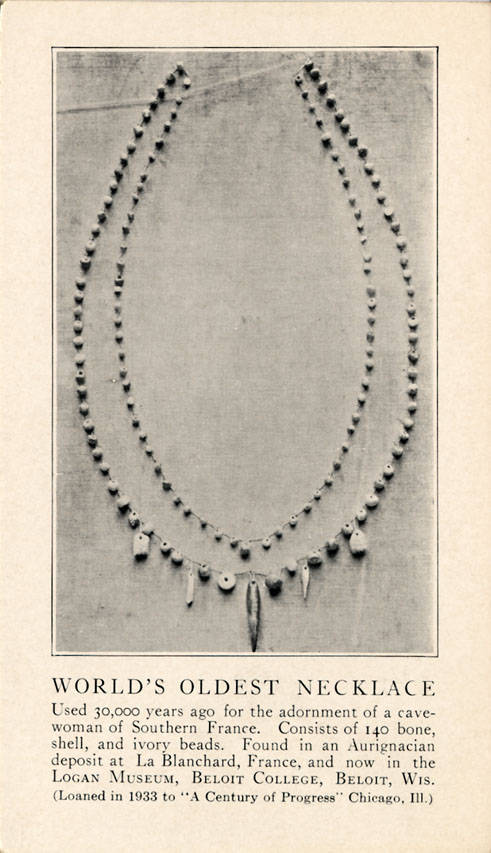
Reconstruction of a necklace found at Castel Merle, in the Blanchard shelter

Castel Merle was one of the most densely populated Paleolithic areas found so far, populated first by Neanderthals and then by direct ancestors of modern man. Many of the shelters contained decorated rocks (paintings and engravings.

Castel Merle was one of the first sites where sieving of the excavations was done, resulting in the findings of many very small objects. Different shelters here revealed thousands of beads, pearls intended for necklaces or clothing. These were made from various materials, including soapstone, bone, shells, mammoth ivory and teeth (animal and human). Many of these materials were imported over long distances, at least 100 km (60 mi) for the shells, and perhaps even from current-day Germany for the ivory. No burials were found here.

== Location ==
Between Lascaux and Les Eyzies, in the heartland of the prehistoric rock caves and shelters of the Vézère valley, lies a small tributary valley, the Vallon des Roches. The small river runs for some 300 metres (980 ft) between two rock faces, and on each side six rock shelters have been found and prehistoric remains unearthed during excavations. The shelters on the left side of the river are open to the public, and the plain in between the rocks houses a small museum. The museum holds, apart from many prehistoric tools, some remains of necklaces with adornments made from mammoth ivory, and a few engraved rocks.

== Main shelters ==
=== Reverdit ===
The Reverdit rockshelter, which has a small source and was later used as a shepherd's hut, was first excavated in 1875 by Alain Reverdit. A more scientific excavation was done between 1911 and 1914 by F. Delage, finding two layers dating to the Magdalenian. In 1923 Castanet found damaged sculpted friezes on the ceiling, displaying a horse and some bisons.

=== Roc de l'acier ===
In this shelter, artifacts have been found from the Périgordian period (35,000 to 20,000 years ago), and earlier occupation from the Aurignacian seems likely here as well.

=== Labattut ===
This shelter was excavated in 1912 and 1913 by Castanet. Most remains are from the Périgordian and the more recent Solutrean times. Rocks which were originally part of the back wall of the shelter, but which afterwards have fallen down, showed paintings of a hand and of three animals; a mammoth and a deer painted in black, and a bison in black against a red background. These rocks are now in the National Prehistoric Museum in Les Eyzies. Another rock showed a large engraving of a horse, and is now kept in the American Museum of Natural History.

=== La Souquette ===
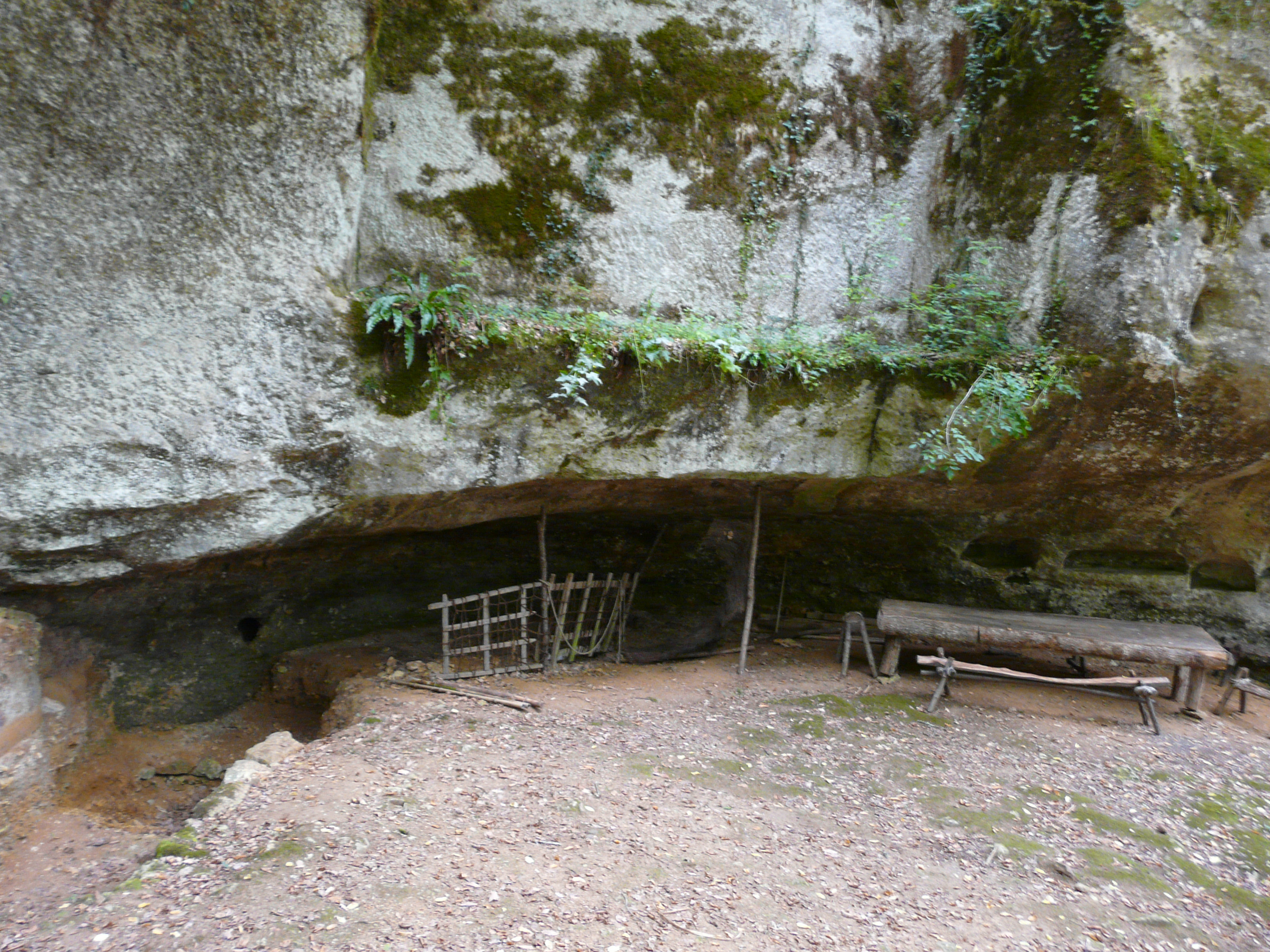
La Souquette shelter

This shelter is 16 metres (52 ft) wide and 5 metres (16 ft) deep. It has been used in the Middle Ages as a shelter as well, and shows remains of the habitation at that time. The prehistoric finds were excavated first in the early 20th century by abbe Landesque, and date to the Aurignacian and the Magdalenian. Here were found different necklaces, consisting of pearls in ivory, bone, and teeth. Another find was a rock with an engraved bison.

=== Blanchard ===
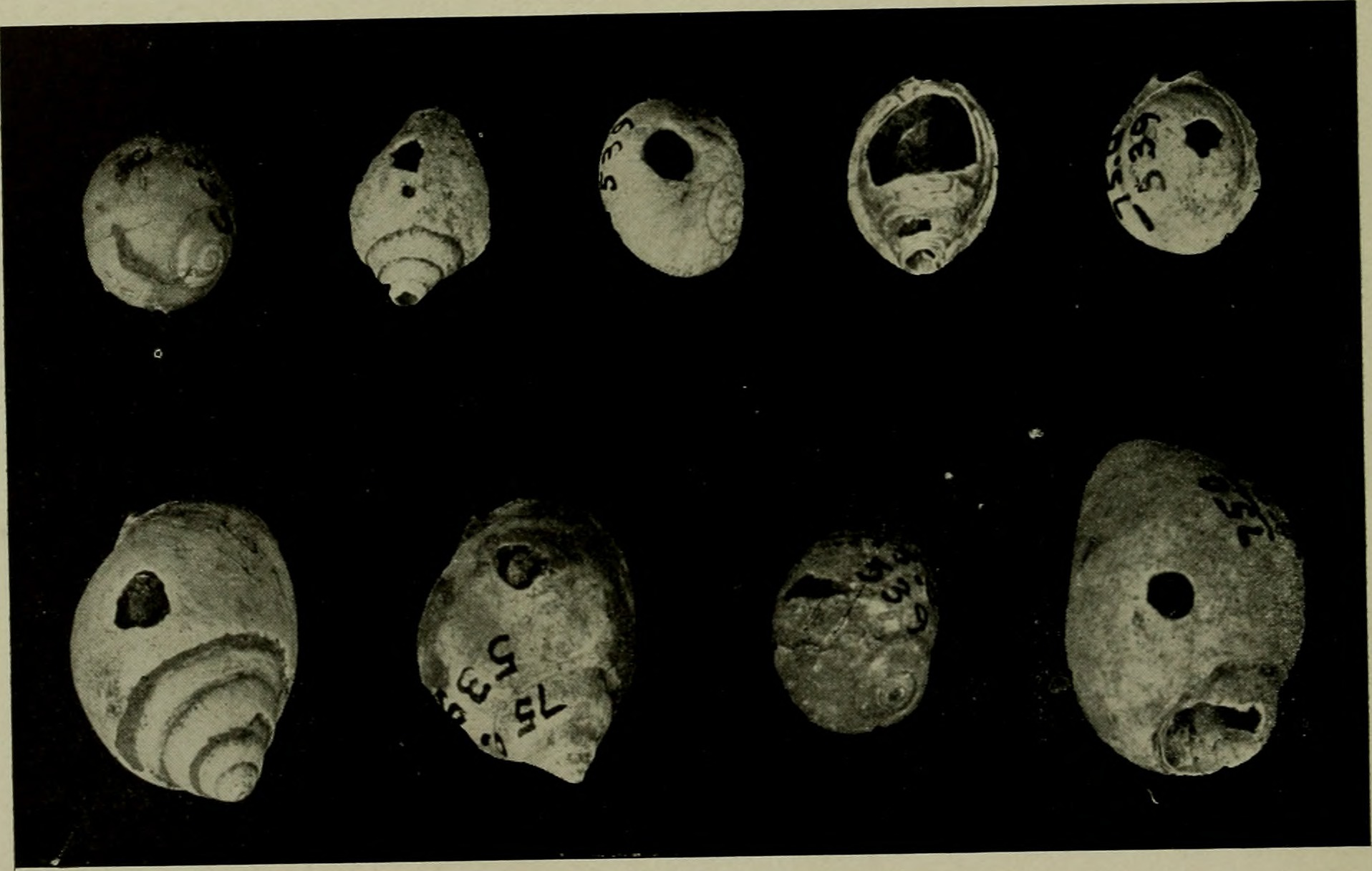
Perforated shells found in the Blanchard shelter

In this rock shelter were found about 20 engraved and probably painted rocks, mainly with vulva motives. Here as well beads were found, some made from shells which came from the Mediterranean area, over 100 kilometres (62 mi) away.

=== Castanet ===
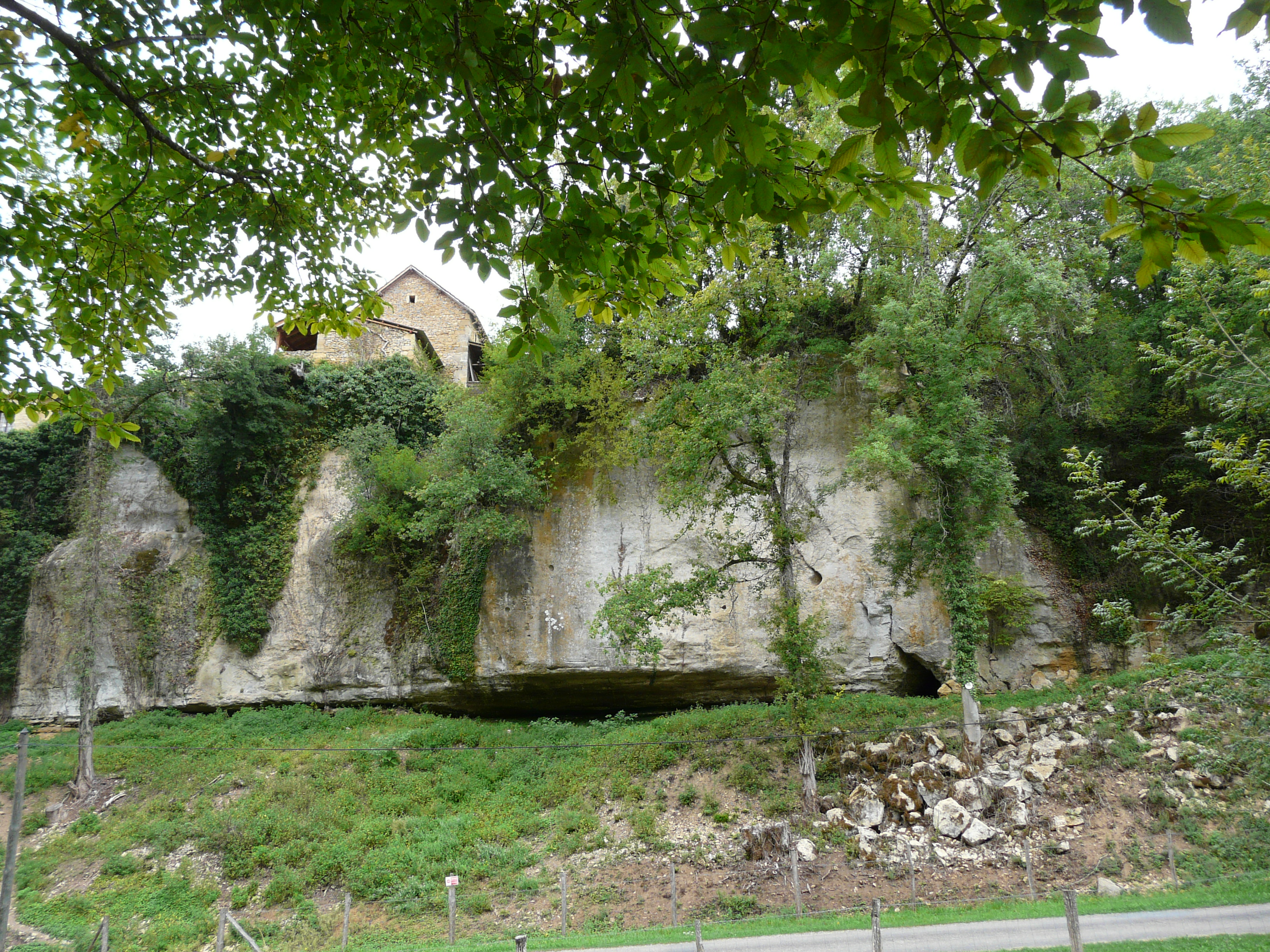
Castanet shelter

This rock shelter, like the Blanchard shelter, had some rocks with engraved vulvas and phalli. In the rock, both at ground level and in the ceiling, small rings have been made which may have been used to fasten a screen of animal skins at the front of the shelter. This shelter was further excavated in 2012 by White, unearthing more than 150,000 (often very small) artifacts.
