= Sergeac =

- Commune
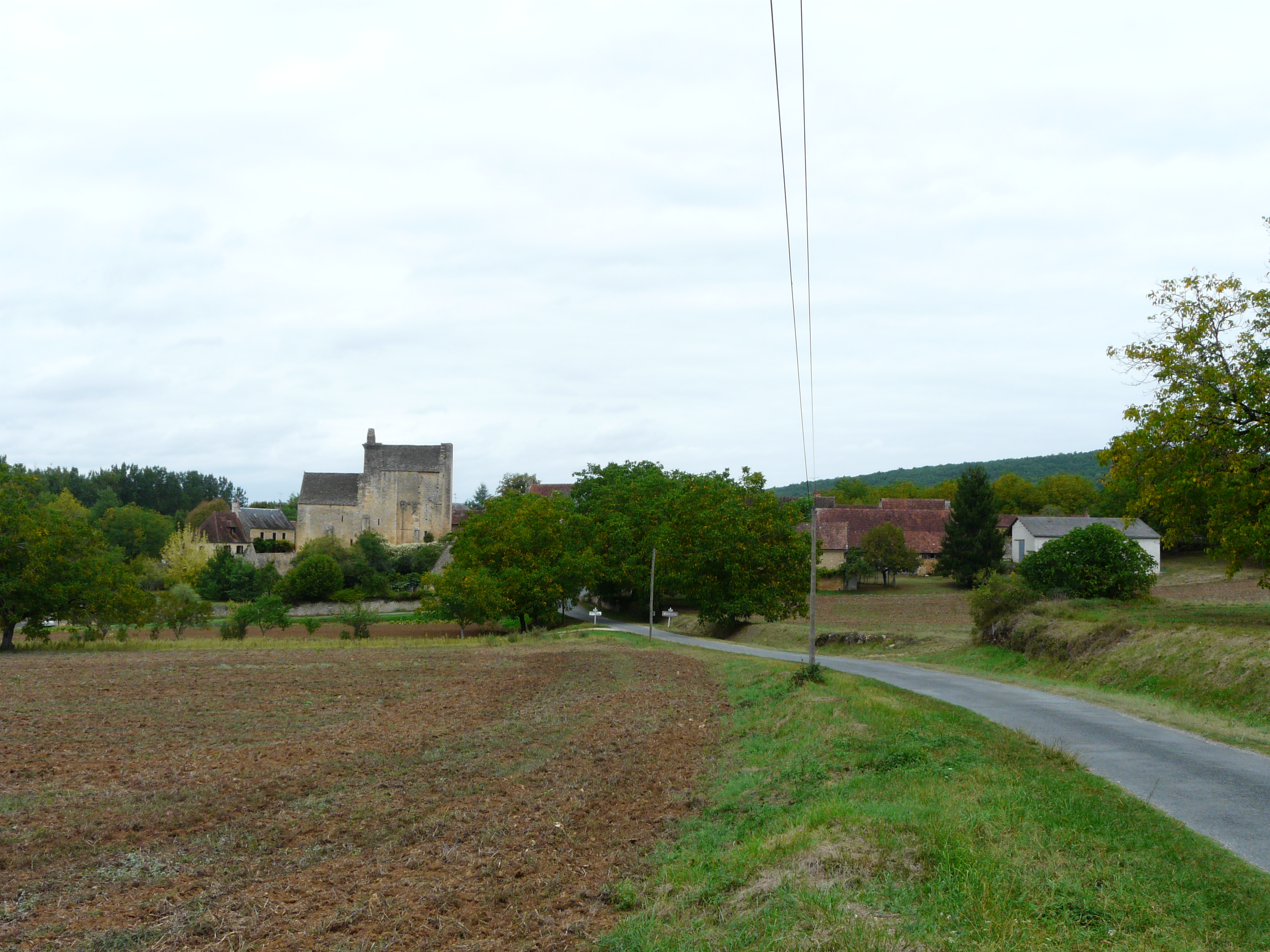
- A general view of Sergeac
- Location of Sergeac
- Location within France Location within Nouvelle-Aquitaine
- Coordinates: 45°00′12″N 1°06′26″E
- Country: France
- Region: Nouvelle-Aquitaine
- Department: Dordogne
- Arrondissement: Sarlat-la-Canéda
- Canton: Vallée de l'Homme

Government
  - Mayor (2020–2026): Isabelle Daumas-Castanet
- Area^{1}: 10.71 km^{2} (4.14 sq mi)
- Elevation: 70 m (230 ft)
- Highest elevation: 271 m (889 ft)
- Lowest elevation: 66 m (217 ft)
- Population (2023): 215
  - Density: 20.1/km^{2} (52.0/sq mi)
- Time zone: UTC+01:00 (CET)
  - Summer (DST): UTC+02:00 (CEST)
- INSEE/Postal code: 24531 /24290
- ^{1} French Land Register data, which excludes lakes, ponds, glaciers > 1 km^{2} (0.386 sq mi or 247 acres) and river estuaries.

Sergeac (French pronunciation: [sɛʁʒak]; Occitan: Sarjac) is a commune in the Dordogne department in Nouvelle-Aquitaine in southwestern France. It lies in the Périgord Noir area. Positioned along the Vézère River, the village is surrounded by high cliffs that house several prehistoric sites, including the Castel Merle rock shelters. These shelters were occupied by Neanderthals and later by Cro-Magnons. The village also features a Romanesque church dating from the 11th century, constructed over Roman ruins.

== Population ==
The area of Sergeac is 10.71 km^{2}.

Historical population
Year	Pop.	±% p.a.
1968	137	—
1975	142	+0.51%
1982	133	−0.93%
1990	156	+2.01%
1999	172	+1.09%
2007	192	+1.38%
2012	221	+2.85%
2017	216	−0.46%
2023	215	−0.08%
Source: INSEE

== Gallery ==
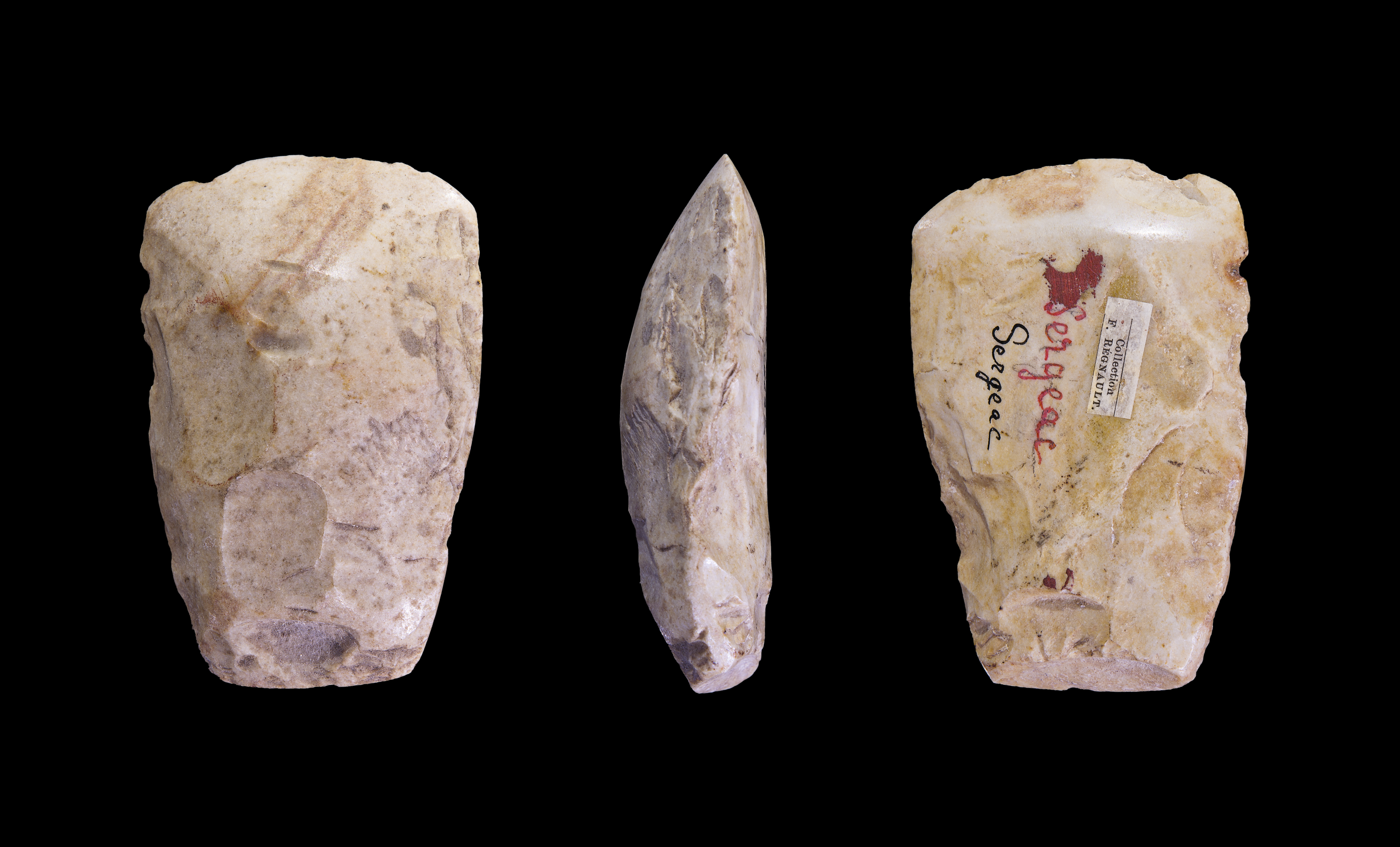
Neolithic polished ax - Muséum de Toulouse.

== See also ==
- Communes of the Dordogne département
