= Malikia spinosa =

Scientific classification
- Domain: Bacteria
- Kingdom: Pseudomonadati
- Phylum: Pseudomonadota
- Class: Betaproteobacteria
- Order: Burkholderiales
- Family: Comamonadaceae
- Genus: Malikia
- Species: M. spinosa

Binomial name
- Malikia spinosa (Leifson 1962); Spring et al. 2005

Synonyms
- Pseudomonas spinosa Leifson 1962

Species of bacterium

Malikia spinosa is a Gram-negative soil bacterium.
