= Clubiona limpida =

Short-Legged Sac Spider

Scientific classification
- Kingdom: Animalia
- Phylum: Arthropoda
- Subphylum: Chelicerata
- Class: Arachnida
- Order: Araneae
- Infraorder: Araneomorphae
- Family: Clubionidae
- Genus: Clubiona
- Species: C. limpida

Binomial name
- Clubiona limpida Simon, 1897

Synonyms
- Clubiona sublimpida Strand, 1909 (provisional name)

Species of spider

Clubiona limpida is a species of spider in the family Clubionidae. It is endemic to KwaZulu-Natal, South Africa, with the type locality given only as "Natal".

== Conservation ==
The species is listed as Data Deficient for taxonomic reasons. The status of the species remains obscure and more sampling is needed to determine the species' range. No exact locality is known beyond the original "Natal" designation.
