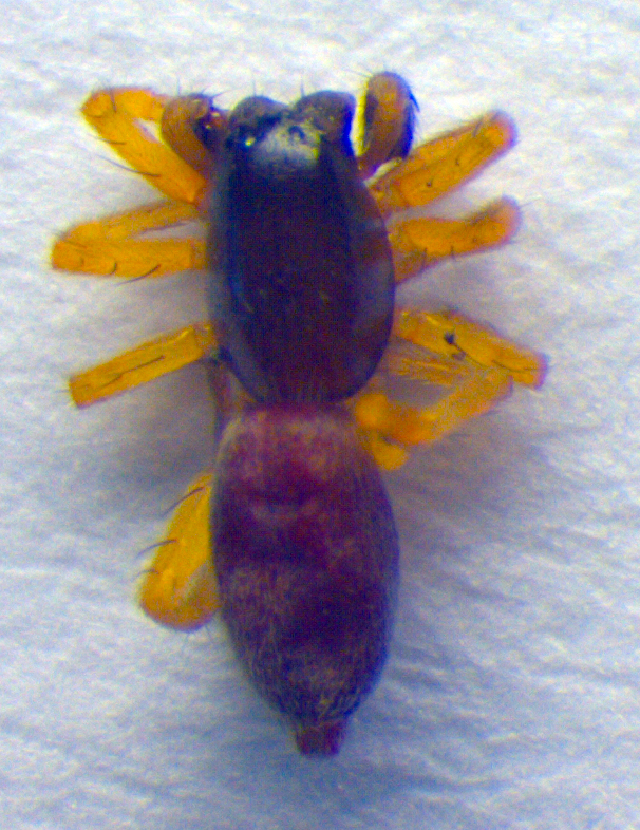

Scientific classification
- Kingdom: Animalia
- Phylum: Arthropoda
- Subphylum: Chelicerata
- Class: Arachnida
- Order: Araneae
- Infraorder: Araneomorphae
- Family: Clubionidae
- Genus: Clubiona
- Species: C. subtilis

Binomial name
- Clubiona subtilis L. Koch, 1867

= Clubiona subtilis =

Species of spider

Clubiona subtilis is a spider species with Palearctic distribution. It is considered new to the fauna of Latvia since 2009.
