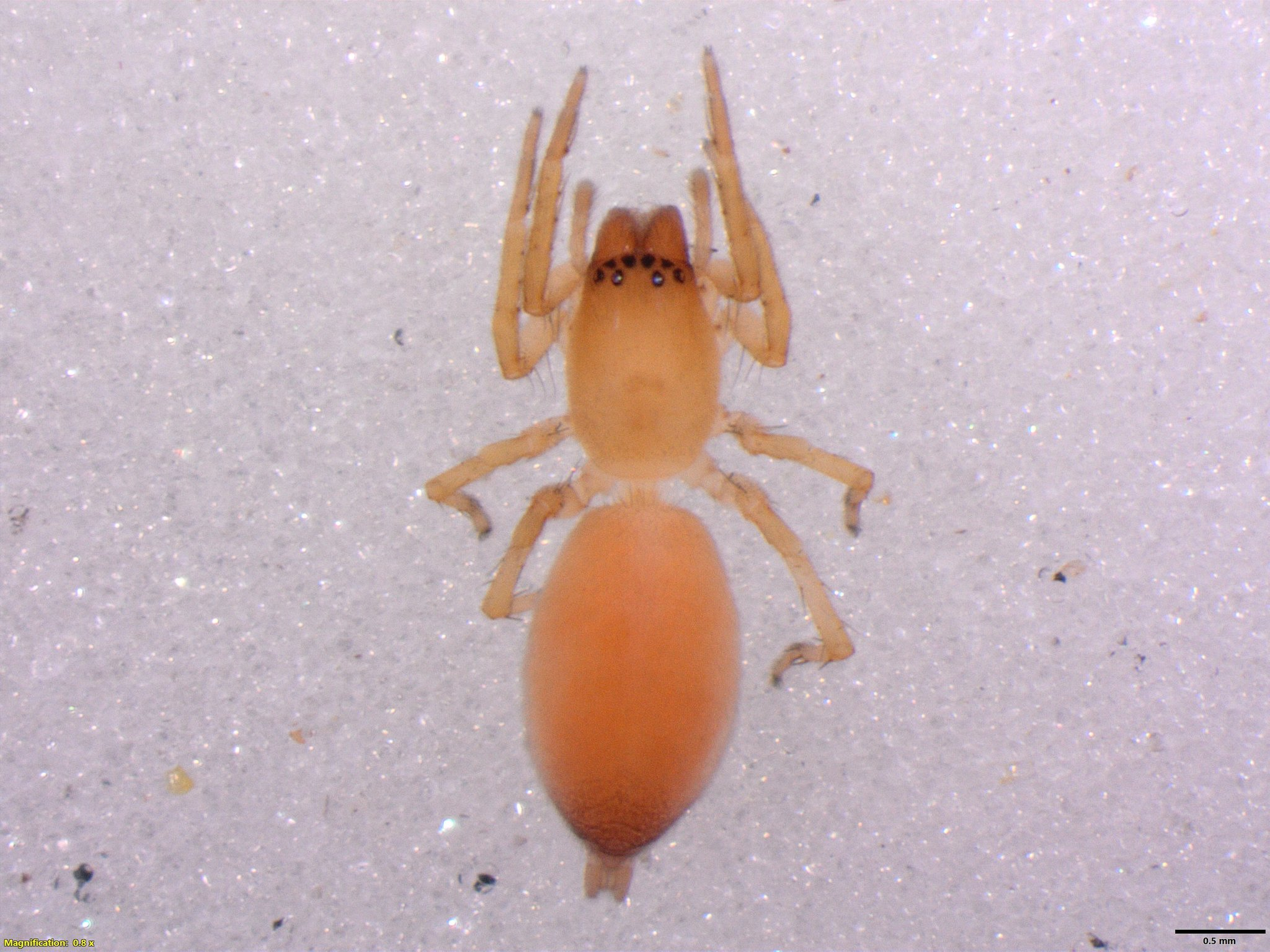
- female

Scientific classification
- Kingdom: Animalia
- Phylum: Arthropoda
- Subphylum: Chelicerata
- Class: Arachnida
- Order: Araneae
- Infraorder: Araneomorphae
- Family: Clubionidae
- Genus: Clubiona
- Species: C. subtrivialis

Binomial name
- Clubiona subtrivialis Strand, 1906

= Clubiona subtrivialis =

Ethiopian Short-Legged Sac Spider

Species of spider

Clubiona subtrivialis is a species of spider in the family Clubionidae. It is an African endemic originally described from Ethiopia and known from East Africa and South Africa.

== Distribution ==
In South Africa, Clubiona subtrivialis is recorded from KwaZulu-Natal and Limpopo.

== Habitat ==
The species is a free-living plant dweller found in the Grassland and Savanna biomes at elevations ranging from 864 to 1186 m.

== Conservation ==
The species is listed as Least Concern due to its wide global distribution range and the fact that it is not suspected to be declining. It is protected in Ben Lavin Nature Reserve and Ngome State Forest.
