= Clubiona johnsoni =

Conservation status
- Secure (NatureServe)

Scientific classification
- Kingdom: Animalia
- Phylum: Arthropoda
- Subphylum: Chelicerata
- Class: Arachnida
- Order: Araneae
- Infraorder: Araneomorphae
- Family: Clubionidae
- Genus: Clubiona
- Species: C. johnsoni

Binomial name
- Clubiona johnsoni Gertsch, 1941

Species of spider

Clubiona johnsoni is a species of sac spider in the family Clubionidae. It is found in the United States and Canada.
