= Clubiona natalica =

Natal Short-Legged Sac Spider

Scientific classification
- Kingdom: Animalia
- Phylum: Arthropoda
- Subphylum: Chelicerata
- Class: Arachnida
- Order: Araneae
- Infraorder: Araneomorphae
- Family: Clubionidae
- Genus: Clubiona
- Species: C. natalica

Binomial name
- Clubiona natalica Simon, 1897

Species of spider

Clubiona natalica is a species of spider in the family Clubionidae. It is endemic to KwaZulu-Natal, South Africa, known only from the type locality given as "Natal" and collected prior to 1897.

== Conservation ==
The species is listed as Data Deficient for taxonomic reasons. The status of the species remains obscure and more sampling is needed to determine the species' range. The vague original locality description makes precise distribution mapping impossible.
