= Clubiona andreinii =

Scientific classification
- Kingdom: Animalia
- Phylum: Arthropoda
- Subphylum: Chelicerata
- Class: Arachnida
- Order: Araneae
- Infraorder: Araneomorphae
- Family: Clubionidae
- Genus: Clubiona
- Species: C. andreinii

Binomial name
- Clubiona andreinii Caporiacco, 1936

Species of spider

Clubiona andreinii is a species of sac spider (family Clubionidae) found in Italy.
