= Clubiona vachoni =

Vachon's Short Legged Sac Spider

Scientific classification
- Kingdom: Animalia
- Phylum: Arthropoda
- Subphylum: Chelicerata
- Class: Arachnida
- Order: Araneae
- Infraorder: Araneomorphae
- Family: Clubionidae
- Genus: Clubiona
- Species: C. vachoni

Binomial name
- Clubiona vachoni Lawrence, 1952

Species of spider

Clubiona vachoni is a species of spider in the family Clubionidae. It is endemic to KwaZulu-Natal, South Africa, originally described from Champagne Castle.

== Distribution ==
Clubiona vachoni is known from a few localities in KwaZulu-Natal at elevations ranging from 1376 to 3272 metres. It has been recorded from high-altitude locations including Cathedral Peak, Champagne Castle, Kamberg Nature Reserve, Monks Cowl, and Royal Natal National Park.

== Habitat ==
The species is a free-living plant dweller found in the Grassland biome at high elevations. It inhabits montane grassland areas.

== Conservation ==
The species is listed as Data Deficient for taxonomic reasons, as only females are known to science and more sampling is needed to collect males and determine the species' range. It is protected in Kamberg Nature Reserve and Royal Natal National Park.
