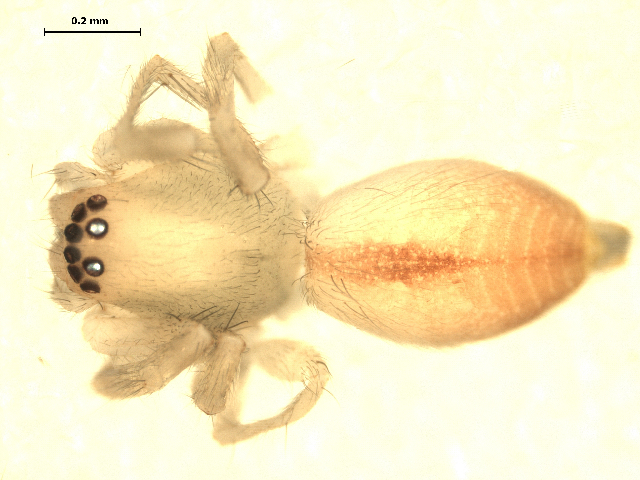

Conservation status
- Secure (NatureServe)

Scientific classification
- Kingdom: Animalia
- Phylum: Arthropoda
- Subphylum: Chelicerata
- Class: Arachnida
- Order: Araneae
- Infraorder: Araneomorphae
- Family: Clubionidae
- Genus: Clubiona
- Species: C. pacifica

Binomial name
- Clubiona pacifica Banks, 1896

= Clubiona pacifica =

Species of spider

Clubiona pacifica is a species of sac spider in the family Clubionidae. It is found in the United States and Canada.
