= Clubiona germanica =

Scientific classification
- Kingdom: Animalia
- Phylum: Arthropoda
- Subphylum: Chelicerata
- Class: Arachnida
- Order: Araneae
- Infraorder: Araneomorphae
- Family: Clubionidae
- Genus: Clubiona
- Species: C. germanica

Binomial name
- Clubiona germanica Thorell, 1871

Species of spider

Clubiona germanica (syn. Clubiona caliginosa), is a sac spider species with Palearctic distribution.
