= Clubiona moesta =

Conservation status
- Secure (NatureServe)

Scientific classification
- Kingdom: Animalia
- Phylum: Arthropoda
- Subphylum: Chelicerata
- Class: Arachnida
- Order: Araneae
- Infraorder: Araneomorphae
- Family: Clubionidae
- Genus: Clubiona
- Species: C. moesta

Binomial name
- Clubiona moesta Banks, 1896

Species of spider

Clubiona moesta is a species of sac spider in the family Clubionidae. It is found in the United States, Canada, and China.
