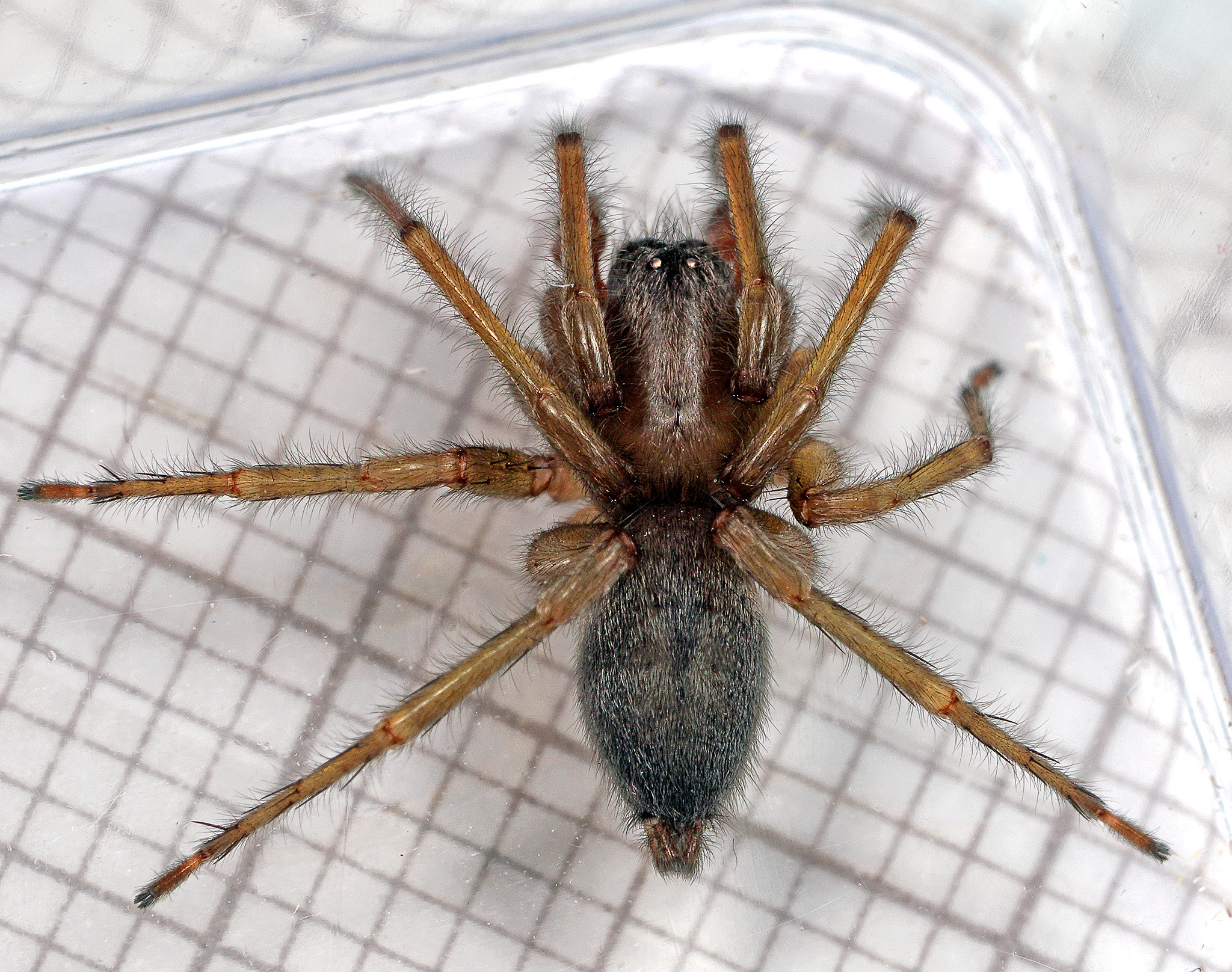

Scientific classification
- Kingdom: Animalia
- Phylum: Arthropoda
- Subphylum: Chelicerata
- Class: Arachnida
- Order: Araneae
- Infraorder: Araneomorphae
- Family: Clubionidae
- Genus: Clubiona
- Species: C. corticalis

Binomial name
- Clubiona corticalis (Walckenaer, 1802)

Synonyms
- Clubiona governetonis Roewer, 1928

= Clubiona corticalis =

Species of spider

Clubiona corticalis, the bark sac spider, is a species of spider belonging to the family Clubionidae.

This species is present in most of Europe and in Central Asia.

The adult males of these spiders reach 6–10 millimetres (0.24–0.39 inches) of length, while females are 7–10 millimetres (0.28–0.39 inches) long.

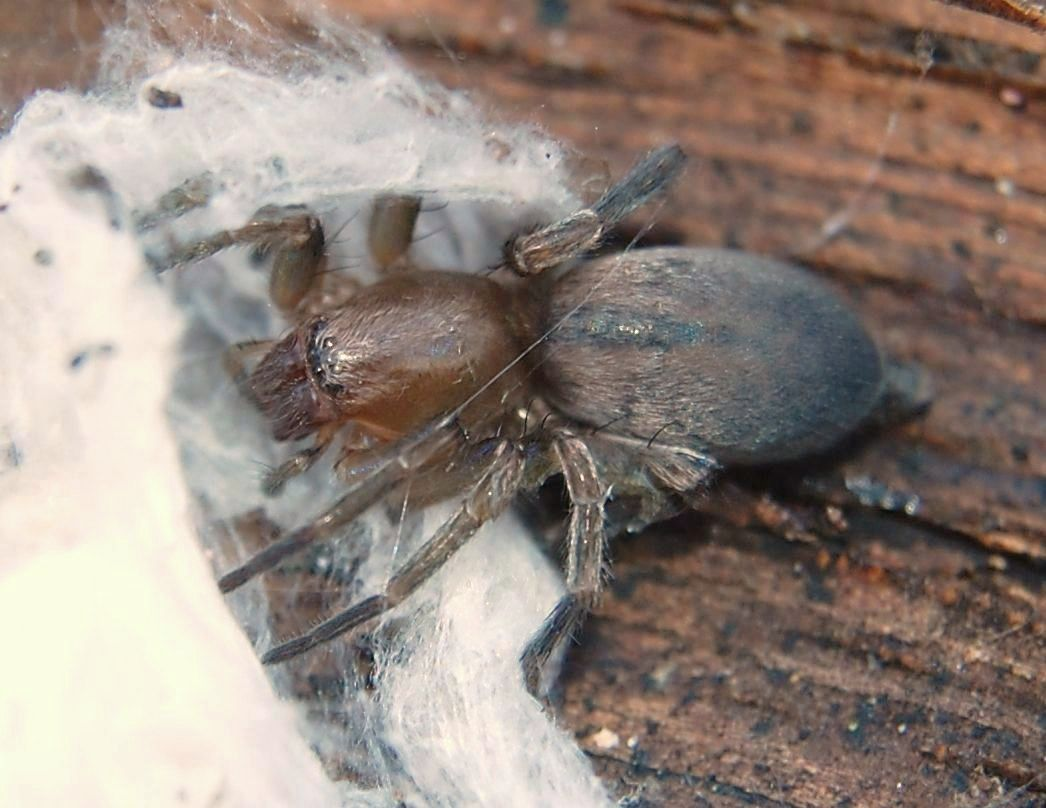
Clubiona corticalis

The (prosoma) and the legs are glossy reddish-brown or light brown, except the jaws (chelicerae), that are much darker. The abdomen (opisthosoma) is brown or dark brown, with leaf-shaped central markings on a clearer background. The two sexes are quite similar, except for slender abdomen of males.

Sexually mature spiders can be encountered from April to September in coniferous forests, mainly under loose bark of dead trees (hence the Latin name corticalis, meaning 'of cortex'), more rarely under stones, but sometimes in houses.

The females lay their eggs in the early Summer, watching over them until they hatch. These spiders usually die at the end of Summer, just some of them overwinter in their nest until next Spring.

== Subspecies ==
- Clubiona corticalis concolor Kulczynski, 1897 — Hungary
- Clubiona corticalis nigra Simon, 1878 — Europe
