= Clubiona scatula =

Conservation status
- Data Deficit (NZ TCS)

Scientific classification
- Kingdom: Animalia
- Phylum: Arthropoda
- Subphylum: Chelicerata
- Class: Arachnida
- Order: Araneae
- Infraorder: Araneomorphae
- Family: Clubionidae
- Genus: Clubiona
- Species: C. scatula

Binomial name
- Clubiona scatula Forster, 1979

Species of spider

Clubiona scatula is a species of Clubionidae spider endemic to New Zealand.

== Taxonomy ==
This species was described in 1979 by Ray Forster from male and female specimens. The holotype is stored in Otago Museum.

== Description ==
The male is recorded at 5.5 mm (0.22 in) in length whereas the female is 6.6 mm (0.26 in). The carapace is orange brown and darker towards the eyes. The legs are a paler orange brown. The abdomen has a band dorsally and shading laterally.

== Distribution ==
This species is only known from Otago and Canterbury in New Zealand.

== Conservation status ==
Under the New Zealand Threat Classification System, this species is listed as "Data Deficient" with the qualifiers of "Data Poor: Size" and "Data Poor: Trend".
