= Clubiona lawrencei =

Lawrence Short Legged Sac Spider

Conservation status
- Least Concern (SANBI Red List)

Scientific classification
- Kingdom: Animalia
- Phylum: Arthropoda
- Subphylum: Chelicerata
- Class: Arachnida
- Order: Araneae
- Infraorder: Araneomorphae
- Family: Clubionidae
- Genus: Clubiona
- Species: C. lawrencei

Binomial name
- Clubiona lawrencei Roewer, 1951

Synonyms
- Clubiona pulchella Lawrence, 1938 (preoccupied)

Species of spider

Clubiona lawrencei is a species of spider in the family Clubionidae. It is a southern African endemic species known from Zimbabwe and South Africa. Originally described as Clubiona pulchella by Lawrence, the name was preoccupied and Roewer provided the replacement name.

== Distribution ==
In South Africa, Clubiona lawrencei has been recorded from four provinces at elevations ranging from sea level to 1898 m. It occurs in the Eastern Cape, KwaZulu-Natal, Limpopo, and Western Cape.

== Habitat ==
The species is a free-living plant dweller commonly found in sweep-net samples from the Fynbos, Forest, Grassland, Indian Ocean Coastal Belt, Savanna, and Thicket biomes.

== Conservation ==
The species is listed as Least Concern due to its wide geographical range and the fact that it is not suspected to be declining. It is protected in Lhuvhondo Nature Reserve and Kirstenbosch National Botanical Gardens.
