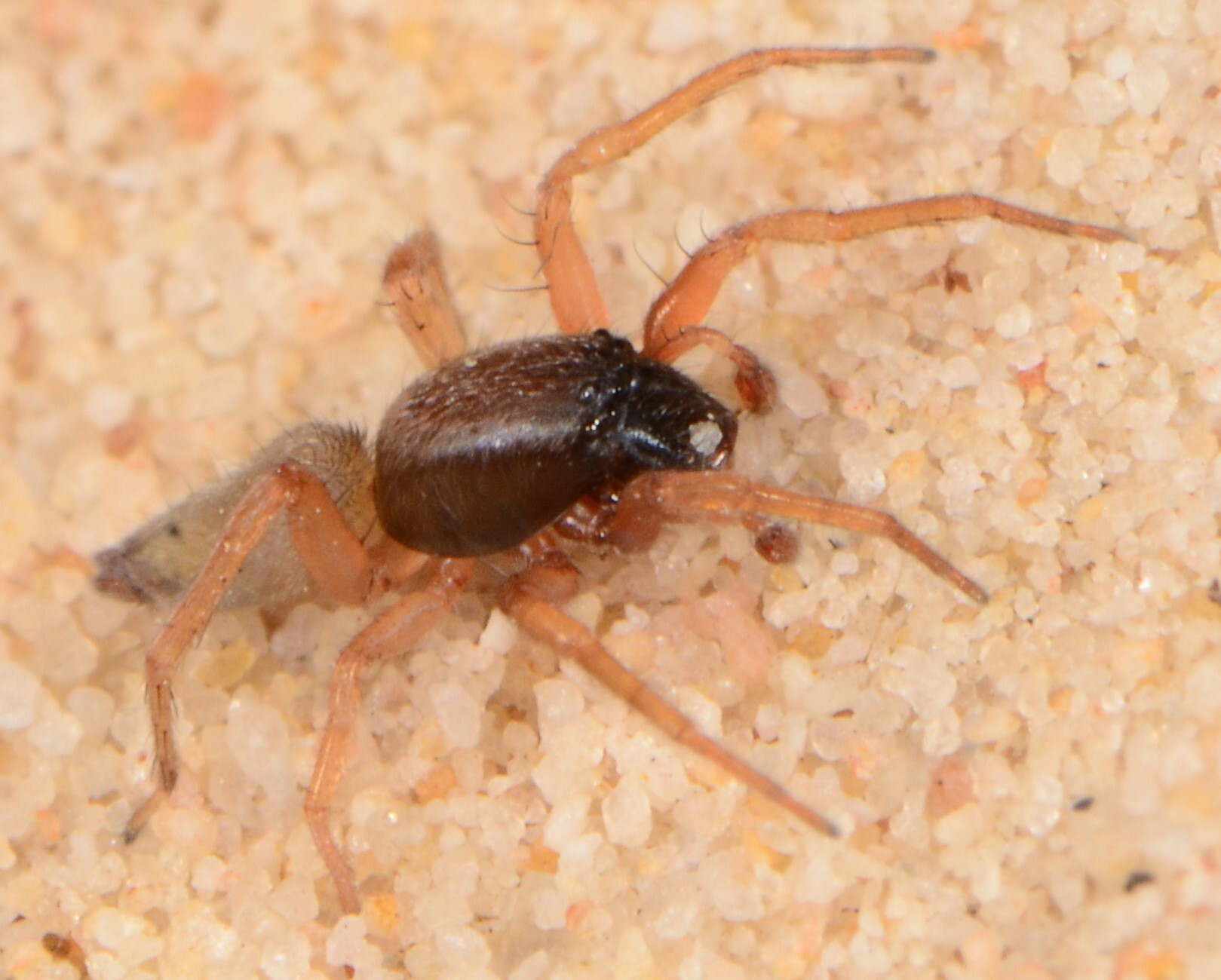
- Male
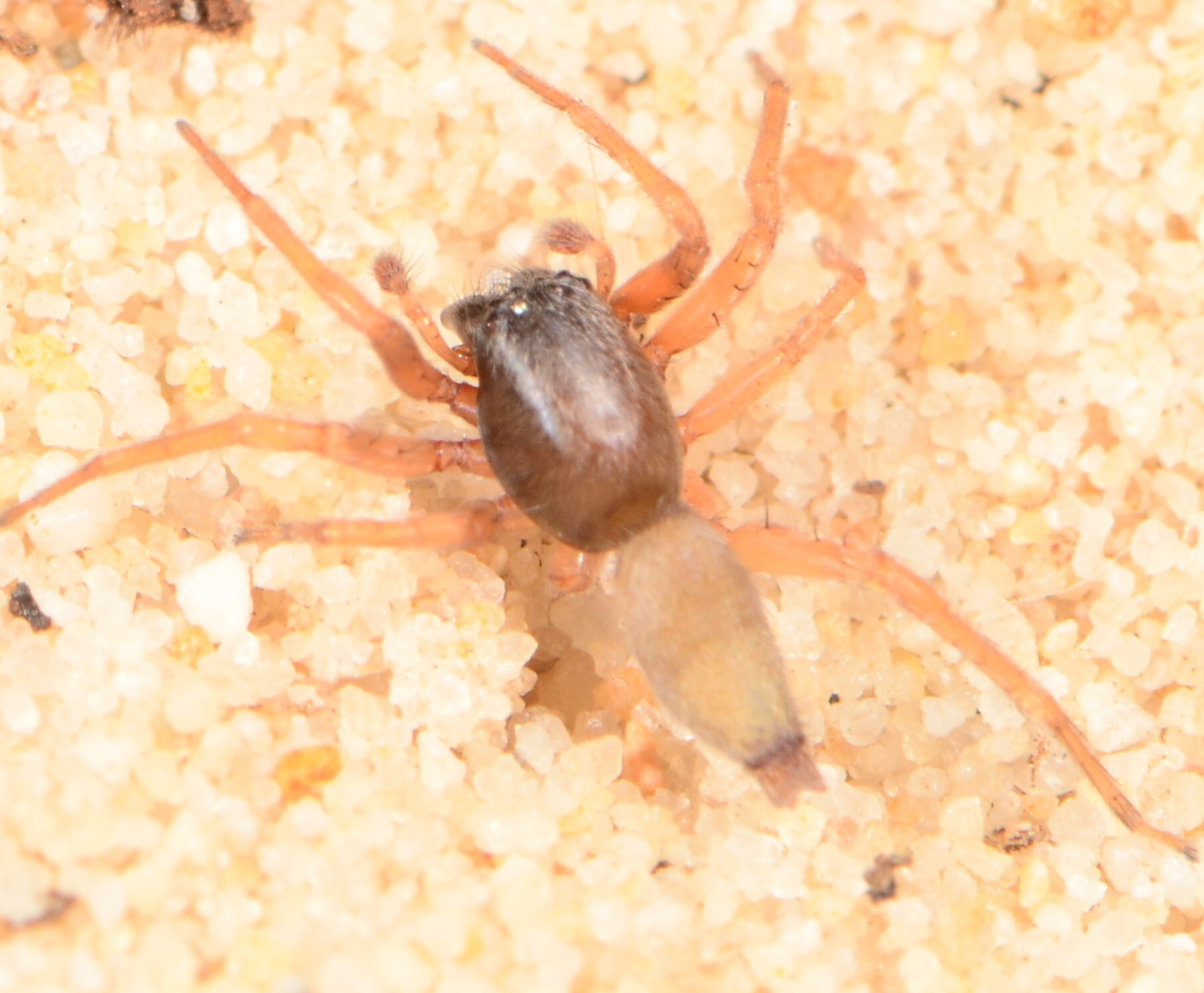
- Male

Scientific classification
- Kingdom: Animalia
- Phylum: Arthropoda
- Subphylum: Chelicerata
- Class: Arachnida
- Order: Araneae
- Infraorder: Araneomorphae
- Family: Clubionidae
- Genus: Clubiona
- Species: C. citricolor

Binomial name
- Clubiona citricolor Lawrence, 1952

= Clubiona citricolor =

Nkandla Short Legged Sac Spider

Species of spider

Clubiona citricolor is a species of spider in the family Clubionidae. It is endemic to South Africa, originally described from Nkandla Forest.

== Distribution ==
Clubiona citricolor is known from two provinces in South Africa. It has been recorded from KwaZulu-Natal and the Free State.

== Habitat ==
The species is a free-living plant dweller found in the Grassland biome. It inhabits forested and grassland areas at elevations ranging from 879 to 1696 m.

== Conservation ==
The species is listed as Data Deficient for taxonomic reasons, as only males are known to science and more sampling is needed to collect females and determine the full species range. It is protected in Nkandla Forest and Seekoeivlei Nature Reserve.
