= Clubiona marmorata =

Scientific classification
- Kingdom: Animalia
- Phylum: Arthropoda
- Subphylum: Chelicerata
- Class: Arachnida
- Order: Araneae
- Infraorder: Araneomorphae
- Family: Clubionidae
- Genus: Clubiona
- Species: C. marmorata

Binomial name
- Clubiona marmorata L. Koch, 1866

Species of spider

Clubiona marmorata is a sac spider species found in Europe. The length of males is 6 mm, while females vary around 6-7 mm.
