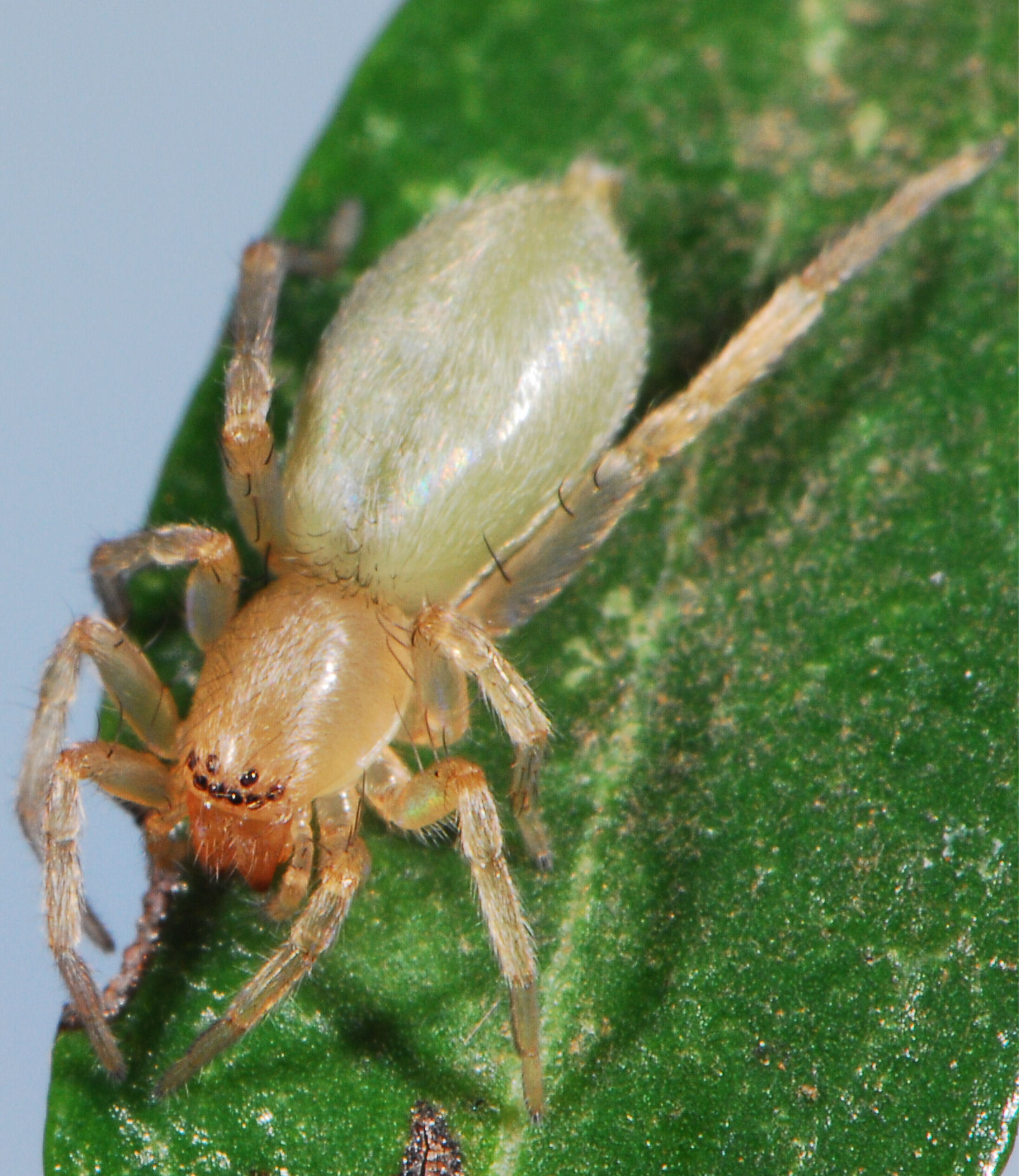
- Female
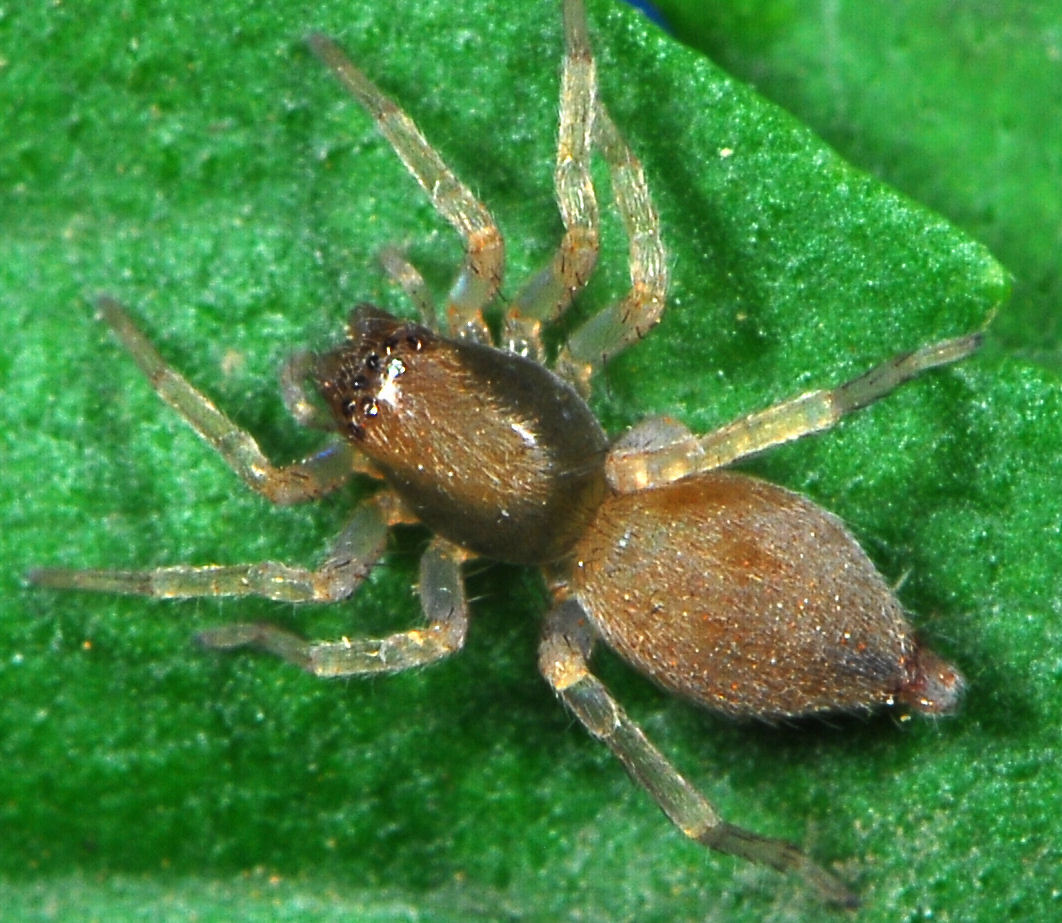
- Female

Scientific classification
- Kingdom: Animalia
- Phylum: Arthropoda
- Subphylum: Chelicerata
- Class: Arachnida
- Order: Araneae
- Infraorder: Araneomorphae
- Family: Clubionidae
- Genus: Clubiona
- Species: C. pupillaris

Binomial name
- Clubiona pupillaris Lawrence, 1938

= Clubiona pupillaris =

Bluff Short Legged Sac Spider

Species of spider

Clubiona pupillaris is a species of spider in the family Clubionidae. It is endemic to South Africa, originally described from the Bluff in KwaZulu-Natal.

== Distribution ==
Clubiona pupillaris is known from five provinces in South Africa at elevations ranging from 1 to 1341 m. It has been recorded from the Eastern Cape, Gauteng, KwaZulu-Natal, Limpopo, and Mpumalanga.

== Habitat ==
The species is a free-living plant dweller found in the Forest, Indian Ocean Coastal Belt, Grassland, Savanna, and Thicket biomes. It has also been collected from citrus orchards and cotton fields.

== Conservation ==
The species is listed as Least Concern. Although presently known only from females, it has a wide geographical range and is thus considered stable. It is protected in seven protected areas.
