= Clubiona revillioidi =

Mozambique Short-Legged Sac Spider

Conservation status
- Least Concern (SANBI Red List)

Scientific classification
- Kingdom: Animalia
- Phylum: Arthropoda
- Subphylum: Chelicerata
- Class: Arachnida
- Order: Araneae
- Infraorder: Araneomorphae
- Family: Clubionidae
- Genus: Clubiona
- Species: C. revillioidi

Binomial name
- Clubiona revillioidi Lessert, 1936

Species of spider

Clubiona revillioidi is a species of spider in the family Clubionidae. It is a southern African endemic species originally described from Mozambique and known from Eswatini and South Africa.

== Distribution ==
In South Africa, Clubiona revillioidi occurs in four provinces at elevations ranging from 7 to 1220 m. It has been recorded from the Eastern Cape, Free State, Gauteng, KwaZulu-Natal, Limpopo, and Mpumalanga.

== Habitat ==
The species is a free-living plant dweller found in the Savanna, Indian Ocean Coastal Belt and Thicket biomes. It inhabits areas with diverse vegetation types.

== Description ==
Both males and females are known to science.

== Conservation ==
The species is listed as Least Concern due to its wide geographical range across southern Africa. It is protected in Nylsvley Nature Reserve and Roodeplaatdam Nature Reserve.
