= Clubiona biaculeata =

Eastern Cape Short Legged Sac Spider

Scientific classification
- Kingdom: Animalia
- Phylum: Arthropoda
- Subphylum: Chelicerata
- Class: Arachnida
- Order: Araneae
- Infraorder: Araneomorphae
- Family: Clubionidae
- Genus: Clubiona
- Species: C. biaculeata

Binomial name
- Clubiona biaculeata Simon, 1897

Species of spider

Clubiona biaculeata is a species of spider in the family Clubionidae. It is endemic to the Eastern Cape province of South Africa.

== Distribution ==
Clubiona biaculeata is known only from the type locality of Port Elizabeth at an elevation of 154 m. This area has been severely transformed due to urban development.

== Habitat ==
The species is a free-living plant dweller found in the Thicket biome. Its natural habitat has been significantly impacted by urbanization.

== Conservation ==
The species is listed as Data Deficient for taxonomic reasons, as only males are known to science and more sampling is needed to collect females and determine the species' full range. The area where it was originally found faces habitat loss threats due to urbanization.
