= Clubiona sparassella =

Scientific classification
- Kingdom: Animalia
- Phylum: Arthropoda
- Subphylum: Chelicerata
- Class: Arachnida
- Order: Araneae
- Infraorder: Araneomorphae
- Family: Clubionidae
- Genus: Clubiona
- Species: C. sparassella

Binomial name
- Clubiona sparassella Strand, 1909

Species of spider

Clubiona sparassella is a species of spider in the family Clubionidae. It is endemic to South Africa, described from an immature specimen with the type locality given only as "Kapland".

== Conservation ==
The species is listed as Data Deficient for taxonomic reasons. The species is known only from the immature type specimen and the status remains obscure. More sampling is needed to collect adult specimens and determine the species' range.
