= Clubiona alpicola =

Scientific classification
- Kingdom: Animalia
- Phylum: Arthropoda
- Subphylum: Chelicerata
- Class: Arachnida
- Order: Araneae
- Infraorder: Araneomorphae
- Family: Clubionidae
- Genus: Clubiona
- Species: C. alpicola

Binomial name
- Clubiona alpicola Kulczynski, 1882

Subspecies
- Clubiona alpicola affinis Schenkel, 1925 — Switzerland

Species of spider

Clubiona alpicola is a sac spider species found from Europe to Central Asia.
