= Clubiona helva =

Helva's Short Legged Sac Spider

Scientific classification
- Kingdom: Animalia
- Phylum: Arthropoda
- Subphylum: Chelicerata
- Class: Arachnida
- Order: Araneae
- Infraorder: Araneomorphae
- Family: Clubionidae
- Genus: Clubiona
- Species: C. helva

Binomial name
- Clubiona helva Simon, 1897

Species of spider

Clubiona helva is a species of spider in the family Clubionidae. It is endemic to South Africa, originally described with the type locality given only as "Natal".

== Distribution ==
Clubiona helva is known from KwaZulu-Natal, specifically from Ndumo Game Reserve. The precise distribution remains unclear due to the vague original locality description.

== Conservation ==
The species is listed as Data Deficient for taxonomic reasons. The status of the species remains obscure and more sampling is needed to collect males and determine the species' range. It is currently recorded from Ndumo Game Reserve.
