= Clubiona nemorum =

Scientific classification
- Kingdom: Animalia
- Phylum: Arthropoda
- Subphylum: Chelicerata
- Class: Arachnida
- Order: Araneae
- Infraorder: Araneomorphae
- Family: Clubionidae
- Genus: Clubiona
- Species: C. nemorum

Binomial name
- Clubiona nemorum Ledoux, 2004

Species of spider

Clubiona nemorum is a sac spider species found in Réunion. It was described by J.-C. Ledoux in 2004.
