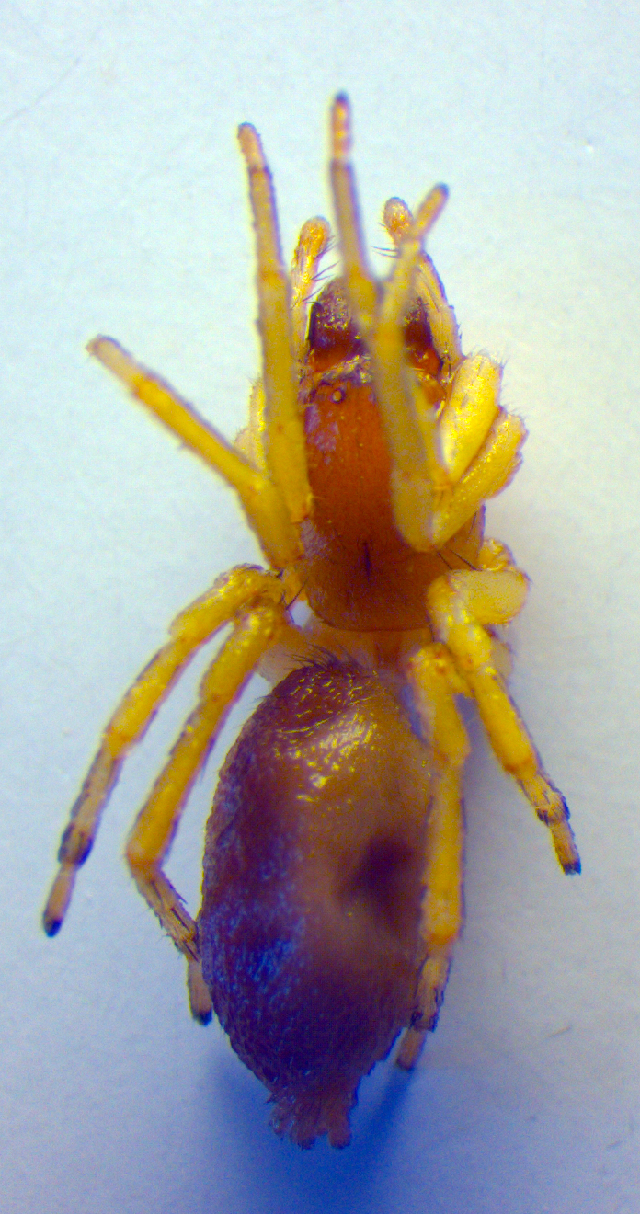

Scientific classification
- Kingdom: Animalia
- Phylum: Arthropoda
- Subphylum: Chelicerata
- Class: Arachnida
- Order: Araneae
- Infraorder: Araneomorphae
- Family: Clubionidae
- Genus: Clubiona
- Species: C. lutescens

Binomial name
- Clubiona lutescens Westring, 1851

= Clubiona lutescens =

Species of spider

Clubiona lutescens is a species of sac spider in the family Clubionidae. It is found in Europe, Turkey, Caucasus, a range from Russia to Kazakhstan, Korea, Japan, and has been introduced into North America.
