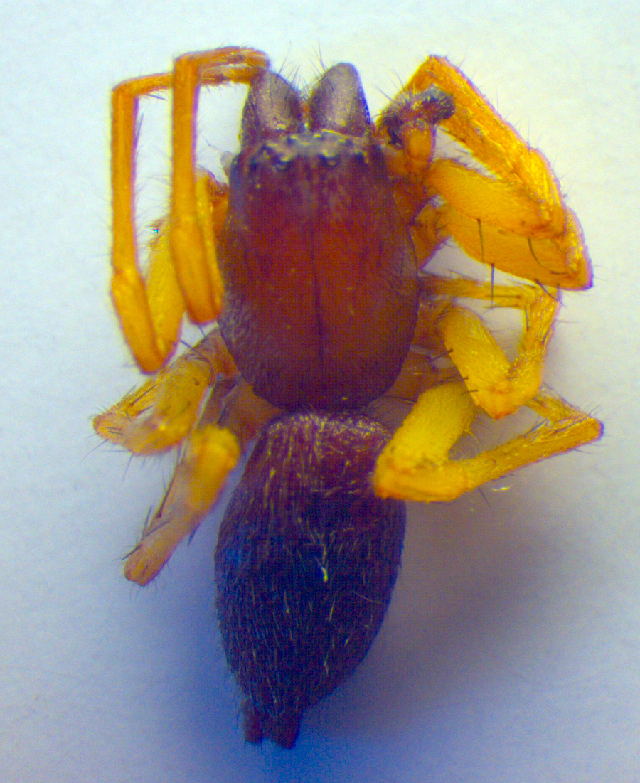

Scientific classification
- Kingdom: Animalia
- Phylum: Arthropoda
- Subphylum: Chelicerata
- Class: Arachnida
- Order: Araneae
- Infraorder: Araneomorphae
- Family: Clubionidae
- Genus: Clubiona
- Species: C. brevipes

Binomial name
- Clubiona brevipes Blackwall, 1841

= Clubiona brevipes =

Species of spider

Clubiona brevipes (syn.: Clubiona rethymnonis) is a species of sac spider (family Clubionidae) with a palearctic distribution.
