= Clubiona frutetorum =

Scientific classification
- Kingdom: Animalia
- Phylum: Arthropoda
- Subphylum: Chelicerata
- Class: Arachnida
- Order: Araneae
- Infraorder: Araneomorphae
- Family: Clubionidae
- Genus: Clubiona
- Species: C. frutetorum

Binomial name
- Clubiona frutetorum L. Koch, 1867

Species of spider

Clubiona frutetorum is a sac spider species found from Europe to Central Asia.
