= Clubiona facilis =

Scientific classification
- Kingdom: Animalia
- Phylum: Arthropoda
- Subphylum: Chelicerata
- Class: Arachnida
- Order: Araneae
- Infraorder: Araneomorphae
- Family: Clubionidae
- Genus: Clubiona
- Species: C. facilis

Binomial name
- Clubiona facilis O. P.-Cambridge, 1910

Species of sac spider

Clubiona facilis is a sac spider species found in England (possibly introduced). It was described by Octavius Pickard-Cambridge in 1910. Only one specimen has ever been collected, that being the holotype.

Rainer Breitling in 2021 suggested it be considered a nomen dubium, and possibly a synonym of Clubiona phragmitis. However, Danniella Sherwood in 2025 revalidated the species using the holotype.
