= Clubiona capensis =

Cape Short Legged Sac Spider

Scientific classification
- Kingdom: Animalia
- Phylum: Arthropoda
- Subphylum: Chelicerata
- Class: Arachnida
- Order: Araneae
- Infraorder: Araneomorphae
- Family: Clubionidae
- Genus: Clubiona
- Species: C. capensis

Binomial name
- Clubiona capensis Simon, 1897

Species of spider

Clubiona capensis is a species of spider in the family Clubionidae. It is endemic to the Eastern Cape province of South Africa.

== Distribution ==
Clubiona capensis is known only from the type locality of Port Elizabeth at an elevation of 154 m. The area has been severely transformed for urban development.

== Habitat ==
The species is a free-living plant dweller found in the Thicket biome. Urban development has significantly impacted its natural habitat.

== Conservation ==
The species is listed as Data Deficient for taxonomic reasons. The status remains obscure and more sampling is needed to collect females and determine the species' range. The original habitat is threatened by loss due to urbanization.
