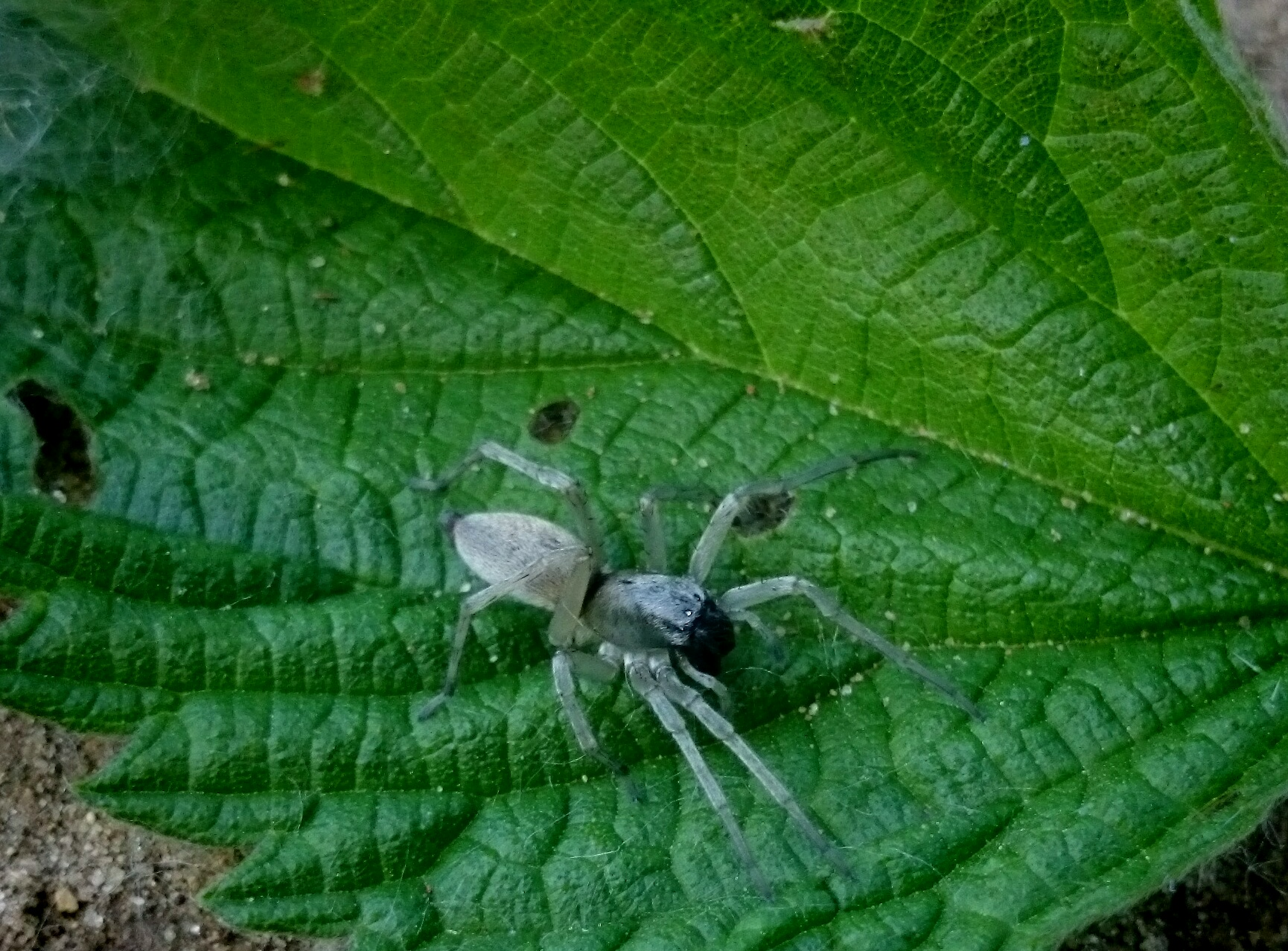

Scientific classification
- Kingdom: Animalia
- Phylum: Arthropoda
- Subphylum: Chelicerata
- Class: Arachnida
- Order: Araneae
- Infraorder: Araneomorphae
- Family: Clubionidae
- Genus: Clubiona
- Species: C. pseudoneglecta

Binomial name
- Clubiona pseudoneglecta Wunderlich, 1994

= Clubiona pseudoneglecta =

Species of spider

Clubiona pseudoneglecta is a sac spider species found from Europe to Central Asia. It has been found in sandpits and lives in steppe habitat.
