= Clubiona cada =

Conservation status
- Not Threatened (NZ TCS)

Scientific classification
- Kingdom: Animalia
- Phylum: Arthropoda
- Subphylum: Chelicerata
- Class: Arachnida
- Order: Araneae
- Infraorder: Araneomorphae
- Family: Clubionidae
- Genus: Clubiona
- Species: C. cada

Binomial name
- Clubiona cada Forster, 1979

Species of spider

Clubiona cada is a species of Clubionidae spider endemic to New Zealand.

== Taxonomy ==
This species was described in 1979 by Ray Forster from male and female specimens. The holotype is stored in Otago Museum.

== Description ==
The male is recorded at 3.9mm in length whereas the female is 4.4mm. This species has a pale yellow brown carapace and legs. The abdomen has traces of a median band and has a faint chevron pattern posteriorly.

== Distribution ==
This species is widespread throughout New Zealand.

== Conservation status ==
Under the New Zealand Threat Classification System, this species is listed as "Not Threatened".
