= Clubiona kulczynskii =

Conservation status
- Secure (NatureServe)

Scientific classification
- Kingdom: Animalia
- Phylum: Arthropoda
- Subphylum: Chelicerata
- Class: Arachnida
- Order: Araneae
- Infraorder: Araneomorphae
- Family: Clubionidae
- Genus: Clubiona
- Species: C. kulczynskii

Binomial name
- Clubiona kulczynskii Lessert, 1905

Species of spider

Clubiona kulczynskii is a species of sac spider in the family Clubionidae. It is found in North America, Europe, a range from Russia to Kazakhstan, and Japan.
