= Clubiona aducta =

Scientific classification
- Kingdom: Animalia
- Phylum: Arthropoda
- Subphylum: Chelicerata
- Class: Arachnida
- Order: Araneae
- Infraorder: Araneomorphae
- Family: Clubionidae
- Genus: Clubiona
- Species: C. aducta

Binomial name
- Clubiona aducta Simon, 1932

Species of spider

Clubiona aducta is a sac spider species found in Portugal, Spain and Italy. It was described by Eugène Simon in 1932.
