= Clubiona mykolai =

Scientific classification
- Kingdom: Animalia
- Phylum: Arthropoda
- Subphylum: Chelicerata
- Class: Arachnida
- Order: Araneae
- Infraorder: Araneomorphae
- Family: Clubionidae
- Genus: Clubiona
- Species: C. mykolai

Binomial name
- Clubiona mykolai Mikhailov, 2003

Species of spider

Clubiona mykolai is a sac spider species found in Ukraine and Bulgaria. It was first described by K. G. Mikhailov in 2003.
