= Clubiona riparia =

Conservation status
- Secure (NatureServe)

Scientific classification
- Kingdom: Animalia
- Phylum: Arthropoda
- Subphylum: Chelicerata
- Class: Arachnida
- Order: Araneae
- Infraorder: Araneomorphae
- Family: Clubionidae
- Genus: Clubiona
- Species: C. riparia

Binomial name
- Clubiona riparia L. Koch, 1866

Species of spider

Clubiona riparia, the riparian sac spider, is a species of sac spider in the family Clubionidae. It is found in Russia, Mongolia, China, Japan, and North America.
