= Clubiona deterrima =

Scientific classification
- Kingdom: Animalia
- Phylum: Arthropoda
- Subphylum: Chelicerata
- Class: Arachnida
- Order: Araneae
- Infraorder: Araneomorphae
- Family: Clubionidae
- Genus: Clubiona
- Species: C. deterrima

Binomial name
- Clubiona deterrima Strand, 1904

Species of spider

Clubiona deterrima is a sac spider species found in Norway.
