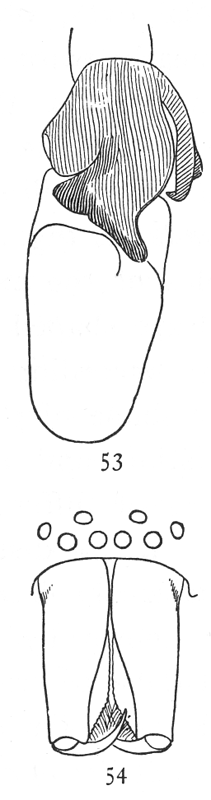

Scientific classification
- Kingdom: Animalia
- Phylum: Arthropoda
- Subphylum: Chelicerata
- Class: Arachnida
- Order: Araneae
- Infraorder: Araneomorphae
- Family: Clubionidae
- Genus: Clubiona
- Species: C. maritima

Binomial name
- Clubiona maritima L. Koch, 1867

= Clubiona maritima =

Species of spider

Clubiona maritima is a species of sac spider in the family Clubionidae. It is found in the United States, Canada, and the Caribbean Sea.
