= Clubiona saxatilis =

Scientific classification
- Kingdom: Animalia
- Phylum: Arthropoda
- Subphylum: Chelicerata
- Class: Arachnida
- Order: Araneae
- Infraorder: Araneomorphae
- Family: Clubionidae
- Genus: Clubiona
- Species: C. saxatilis

Binomial name
- Clubiona saxatilis L. Koch, 1867

Synonyms
- Clubiona dvoraki Miller, 1943

Species of spider

Clubiona saxatilis is a sac spider species found in Europe. The body length of both female and male ranges from 6-7mm.
