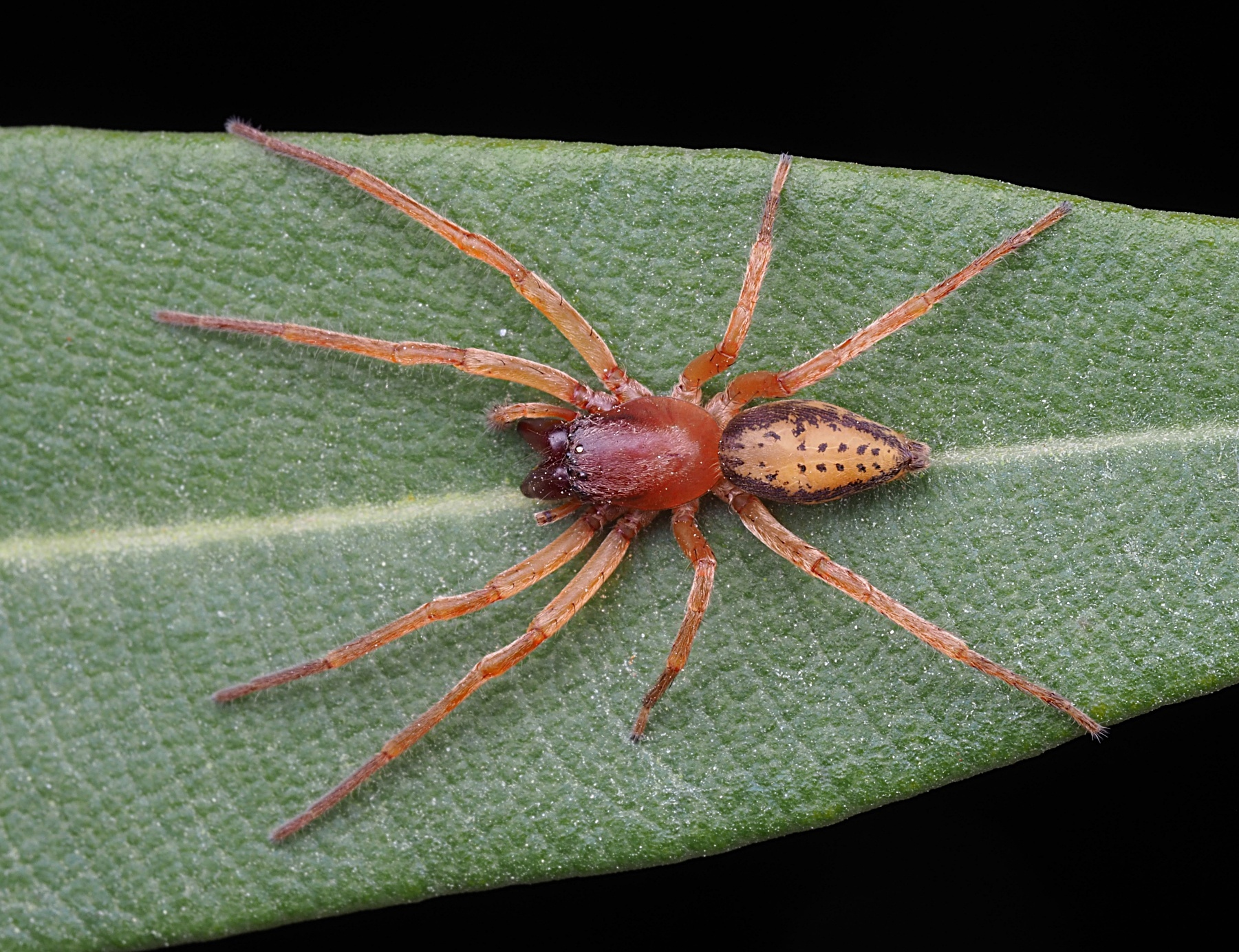

Conservation status
- Not Threatened (NZ TCS)

Scientific classification
- Kingdom: Animalia
- Phylum: Arthropoda
- Subphylum: Chelicerata
- Class: Arachnida
- Order: Araneae
- Infraorder: Araneomorphae
- Family: Clubionidae
- Genus: Clubiona
- Species: C. peculiaris

Binomial name
- Clubiona peculiaris Koch, 1873

= Clubiona peculiaris =

Species of spider

Clubiona peculiaris is a species of Clubionidae spider endemic to New Zealand.

== Taxonomy ==
This species was described in 1873 by Ludwig Carl Christian Koch from a male specimen. In 1979, the species was revised and the male was described. The holotype is stored in Vienna Museum.

== Description ==
The male is recorded at 6.9mm in length whereas the female is 8.7mm. The cephalothorax and legs are orange brown. The abdomen is cream coloured, has spots dorsally and shading laterally.

== Distribution and habitat ==
This species is widespread throughout New Zealand. It is typically found in scrub and bush margins.

== Conservation status ==
Under the New Zealand Threat Classification System, this species is listed as "Not Threatened".
