= Clubiona blesti =

Conservation status
- Not Threatened (NZ TCS)

Scientific classification
- Kingdom: Animalia
- Phylum: Arthropoda
- Subphylum: Chelicerata
- Class: Arachnida
- Order: Araneae
- Infraorder: Araneomorphae
- Family: Clubionidae
- Genus: Clubiona
- Species: C. blesti

Binomial name
- Clubiona blesti Forster, 1979

Species of spider

Clubiona blesti is a species of Clubionidae spider endemic to New Zealand.

== Taxonomy ==
This species was described in 1979 by Ray Forster from female specimens. It was redescribed in 2012. The holotype is stored in Otago Museum.

== Description ==
The male is recorded at 6.9mm in length whereas the female is 9.7mm. The carapace and legs are yellow. The abdomen has a band dorsally and shading laterally.

== Distribution ==
This species is distributed throughout the South Island of New Zealand.

== Conservation status ==
Under the New Zealand Threat Classification System, this species is listed as "Not Threatened".
