= Clubiona silvestris =

Scientific classification
- Kingdom: Animalia
- Phylum: Arthropoda
- Subphylum: Chelicerata
- Class: Arachnida
- Order: Araneae
- Infraorder: Araneomorphae
- Family: Clubionidae
- Genus: Clubiona
- Species: C. silvestris

Binomial name
- Clubiona silvestris Deeleman-Reinhold, 2001

Species of spider

Clubiona silvestris is a species of spiders in the family Clubionidae (sac spiders), found in Borneo. It was first described by Christa Deeleman-Reinhold in 2001.
