= Clubiona godfreyi =

Godfrey Short Legged Sac Spider

Conservation status
- Least Concern (SANBI Red List)

Scientific classification
- Kingdom: Animalia
- Phylum: Arthropoda
- Subphylum: Chelicerata
- Class: Arachnida
- Order: Araneae
- Infraorder: Araneomorphae
- Family: Clubionidae
- Genus: Clubiona
- Species: C. godfreyi

Binomial name
- Clubiona godfreyi Lessert, 1921

Species of spider

Clubiona godfreyi is a species of spider in the family Clubionidae. It is an African endemic species originally described from Uganda and also recorded from South Africa.

== Distribution ==
In South Africa, Clubiona godfreyi is known from two provinces: the Eastern Cape and Limpopo. The species is under-collected and suspected to occur in other sub-Saharan countries.

== Habitat ==
The species is a free-living plant dweller found in the Savanna and Thicket biomes. It constructs sac-like retreats in vegetation.

== Conservation ==
The species is listed as Least Concern due to its wide geographic range across Africa. In South Africa, it is protected in Lhuvhondo Nature Reserve.
