= Clubiona valens =

Valens Short Legged Sac Spider

Scientific classification
- Kingdom: Animalia
- Phylum: Arthropoda
- Subphylum: Chelicerata
- Class: Arachnida
- Order: Araneae
- Infraorder: Araneomorphae
- Family: Clubionidae
- Genus: Clubiona
- Species: C. valens

Binomial name
- Clubiona valens Simon, 1897

Species of spider

Clubiona valens is a species of spider in the family Clubionidae. It is endemic to KwaZulu-Natal, South Africa, with the type locality given only as "Natal".

== Distribution ==
Clubiona valens has been recorded from only two additional locations in KwaZulu-Natal at elevations ranging from 11 to 3223 metres, showing a remarkable altitudinal range. It has been found at Champagne Castle and Durban.

== Habitat ==
The species is a free-living plant dweller found in the Grassland and Indian Ocean Coastal Belt biomes. It inhabits both high-altitude montane areas and coastal regions.

== Description ==
Clubiona valens exhibits the typical characteristics of the genus, with both males and females known to science. The species shows the characteristic sac spider morphology and coloration.

== Conservation ==
The species is listed as Data Deficient. Only two additional collections have been made since its original description and the status of the species remains obscure. More sampling is needed to determine the species' range.
