= Clubiona hilaris =

Scientific classification
- Kingdom: Animalia
- Phylum: Arthropoda
- Subphylum: Chelicerata
- Class: Arachnida
- Order: Araneae
- Infraorder: Araneomorphae
- Family: Clubionidae
- Genus: Clubiona
- Species: C. hilaris

Binomial name
- Clubiona hilaris Simon, 1878

Species of spider

Clubiona hilaris is a sac spider species found in Europe.
