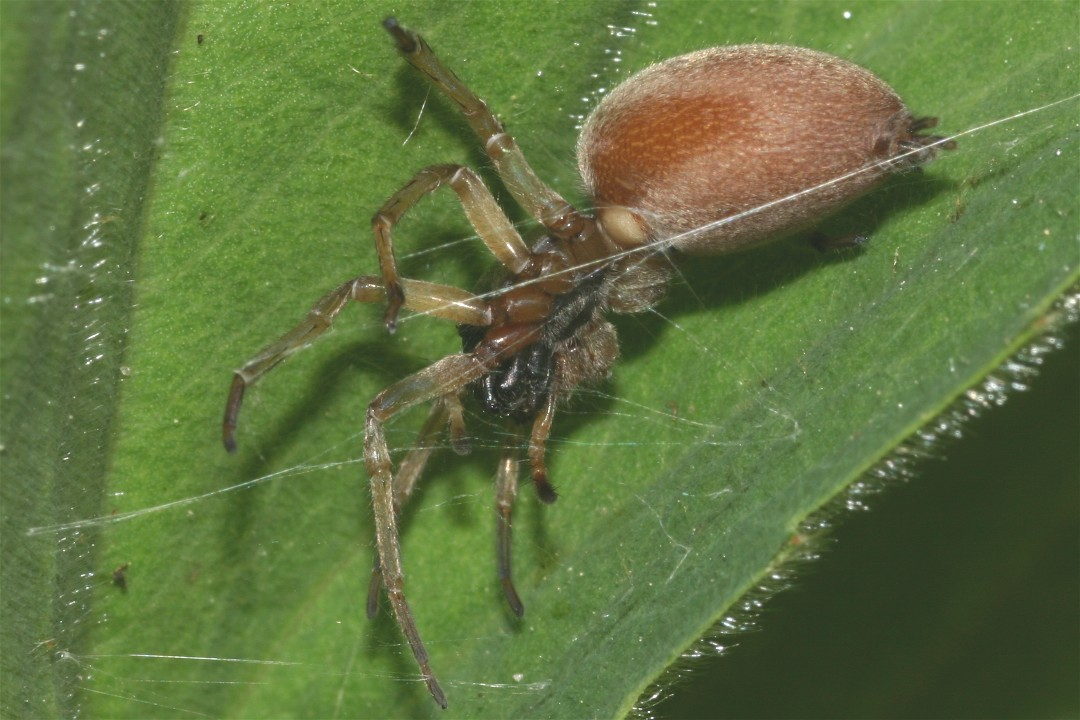
- Clubiona trivialis
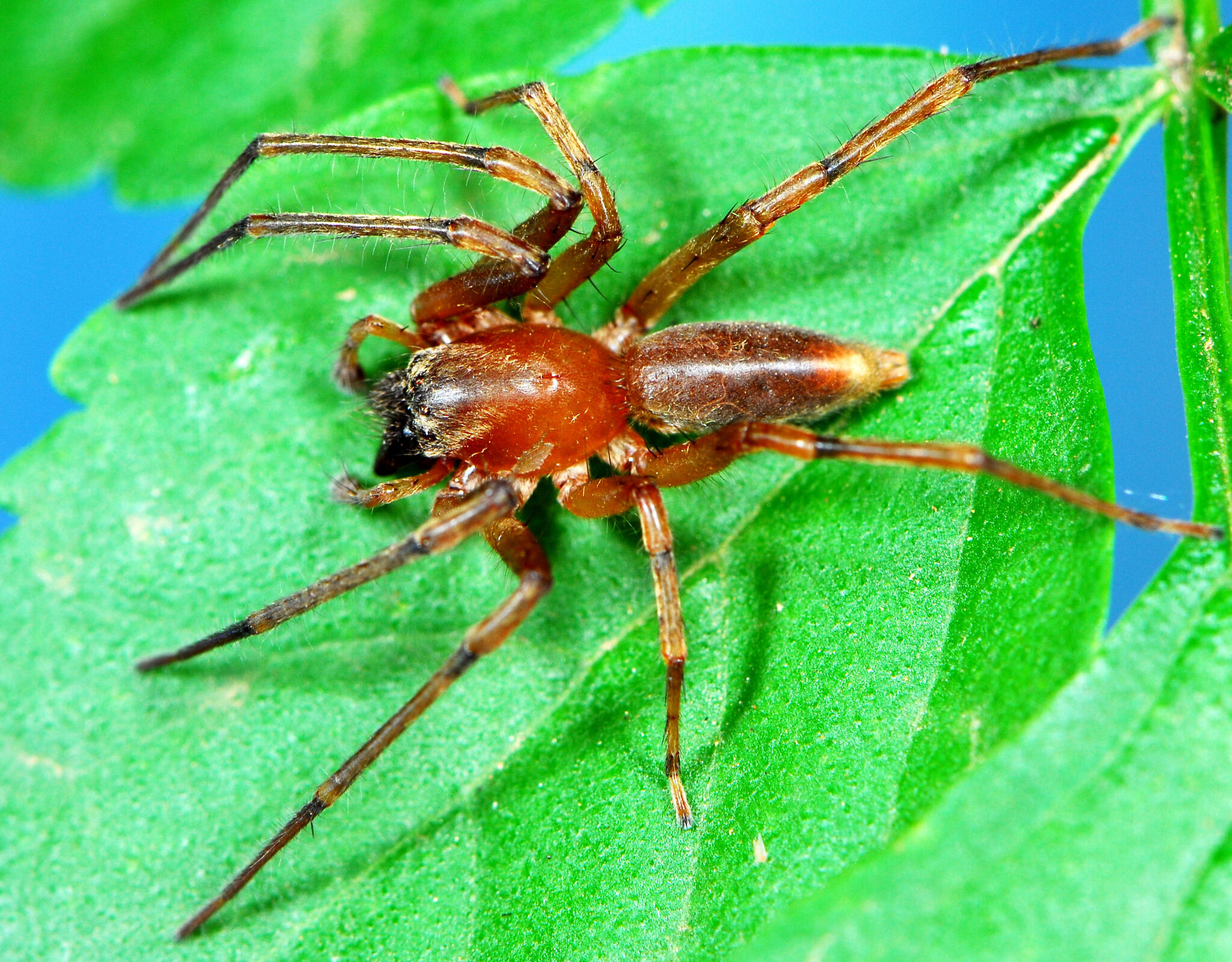
- Male C. durbana

Scientific classification
- Kingdom: Animalia
- Phylum: Arthropoda
- Subphylum: Chelicerata
- Class: Arachnida
- Order: Araneae
- Infraorder: Araneomorphae
- Family: Clubionidae
- Genus: Clubiona; Latreille, 1804

Type species
- C. pallidula (Clerck, 1757)

Species
- 535, see text

Synonyms
- Anaclubiona Ono, 2010; Atalia Thorell, 1887; Bucliona Benoit, 1977; Hirtia Thorell, 1881; Tolophus Thorell, 1891

= Clubiona =

Clubiona Temporal range: Palaeogene– Present

Genus of spiders

Clubiona is a genus of sac spiders that was first described by Pierre André Latreille in 1804.

== Species ==
As of October 2025, this genus includes 535 species and five subspecies, found in Oceania, Africa, North America, the Caribbean, Asia, Europe, South America, Panama, and on Saint Helena.

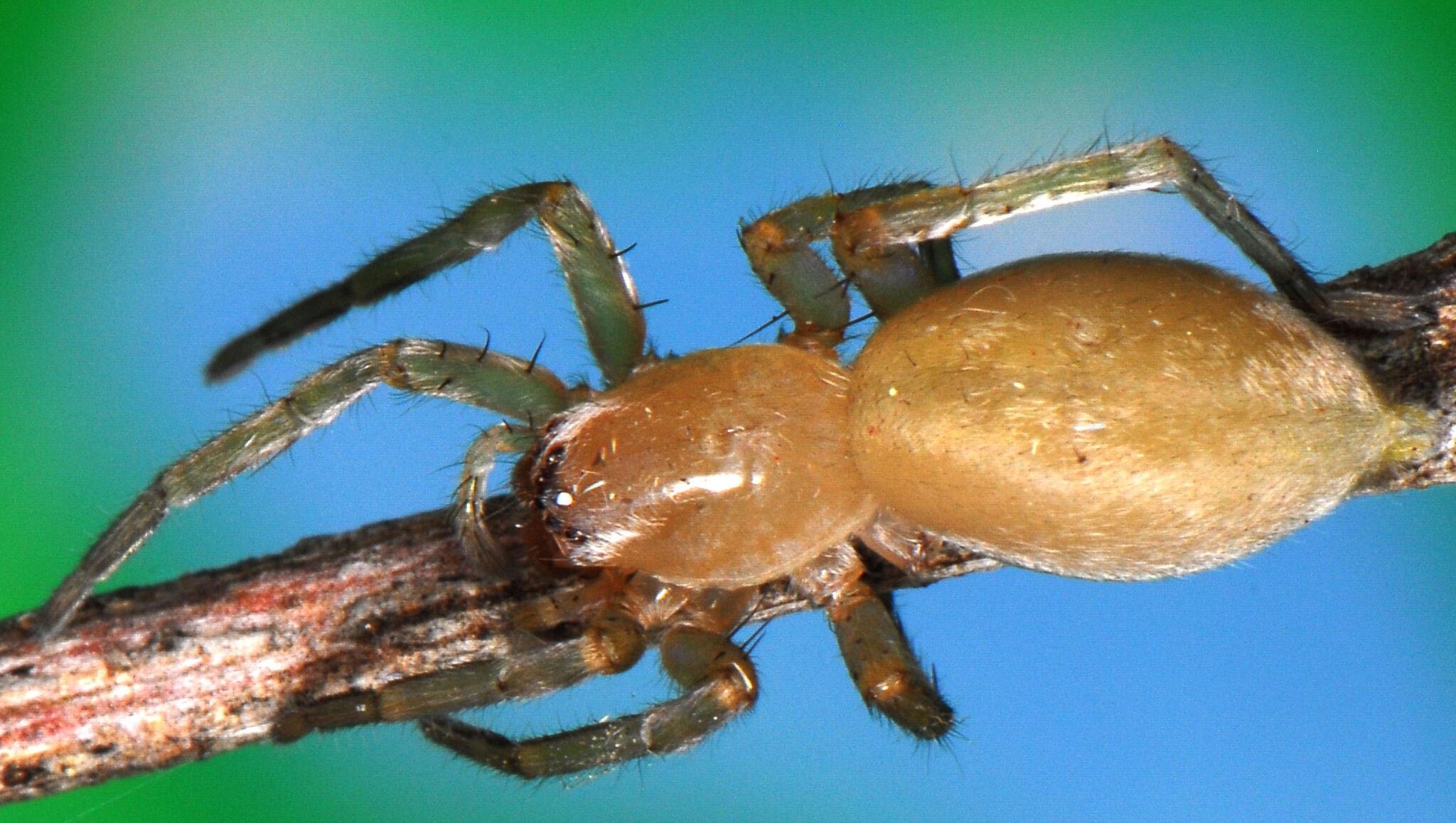
female C. bevisi

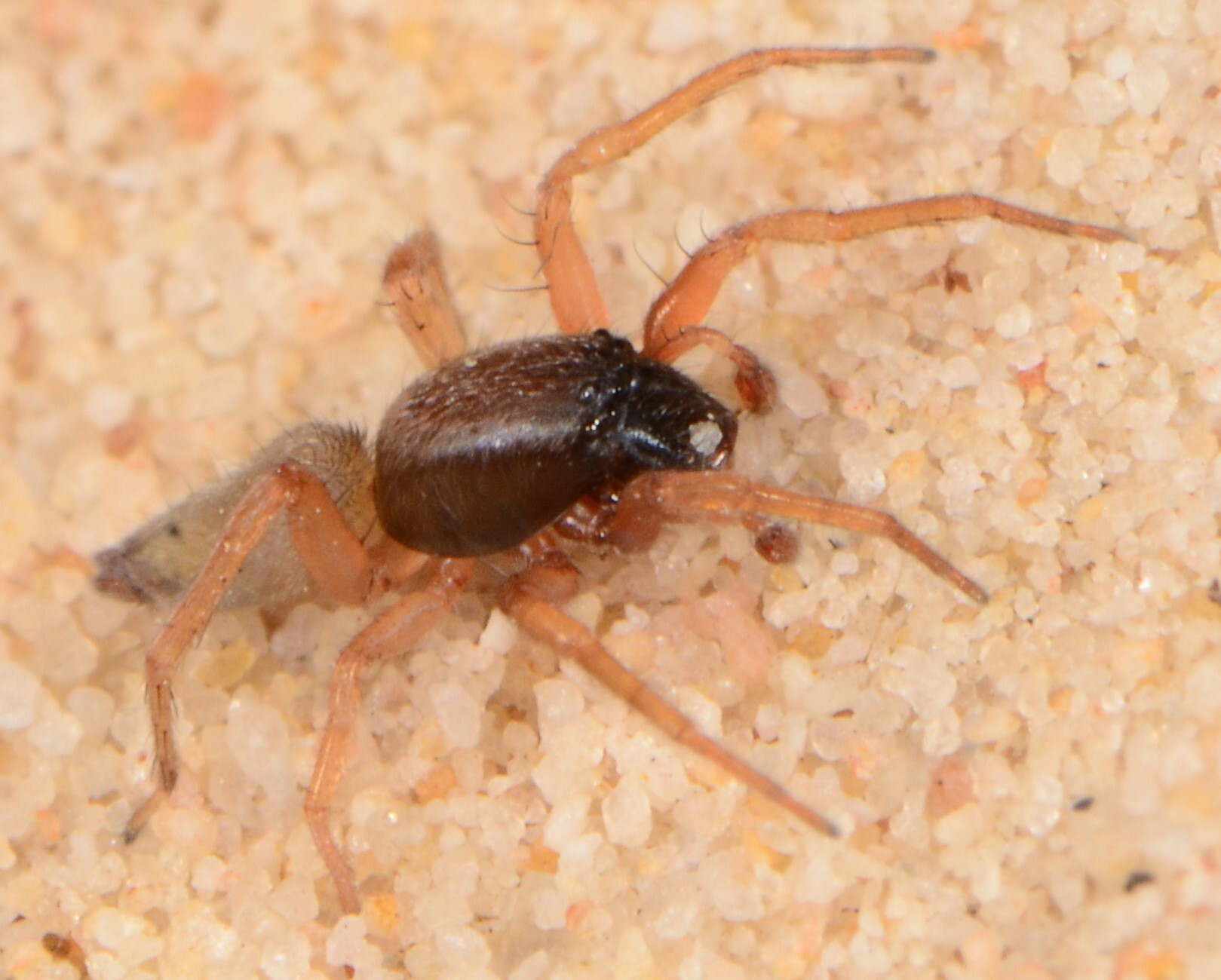
male C. citricolor

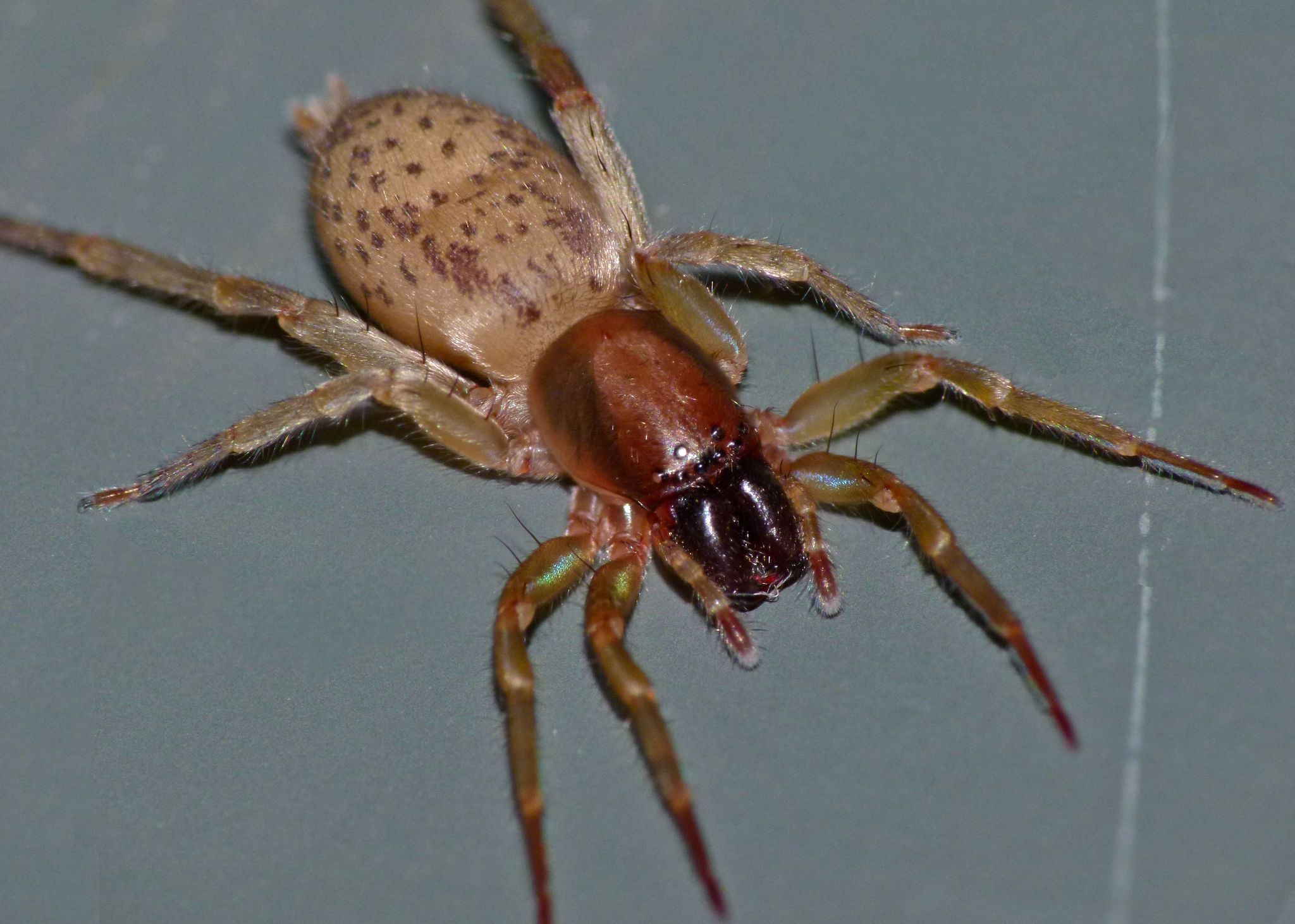
C. huttoni

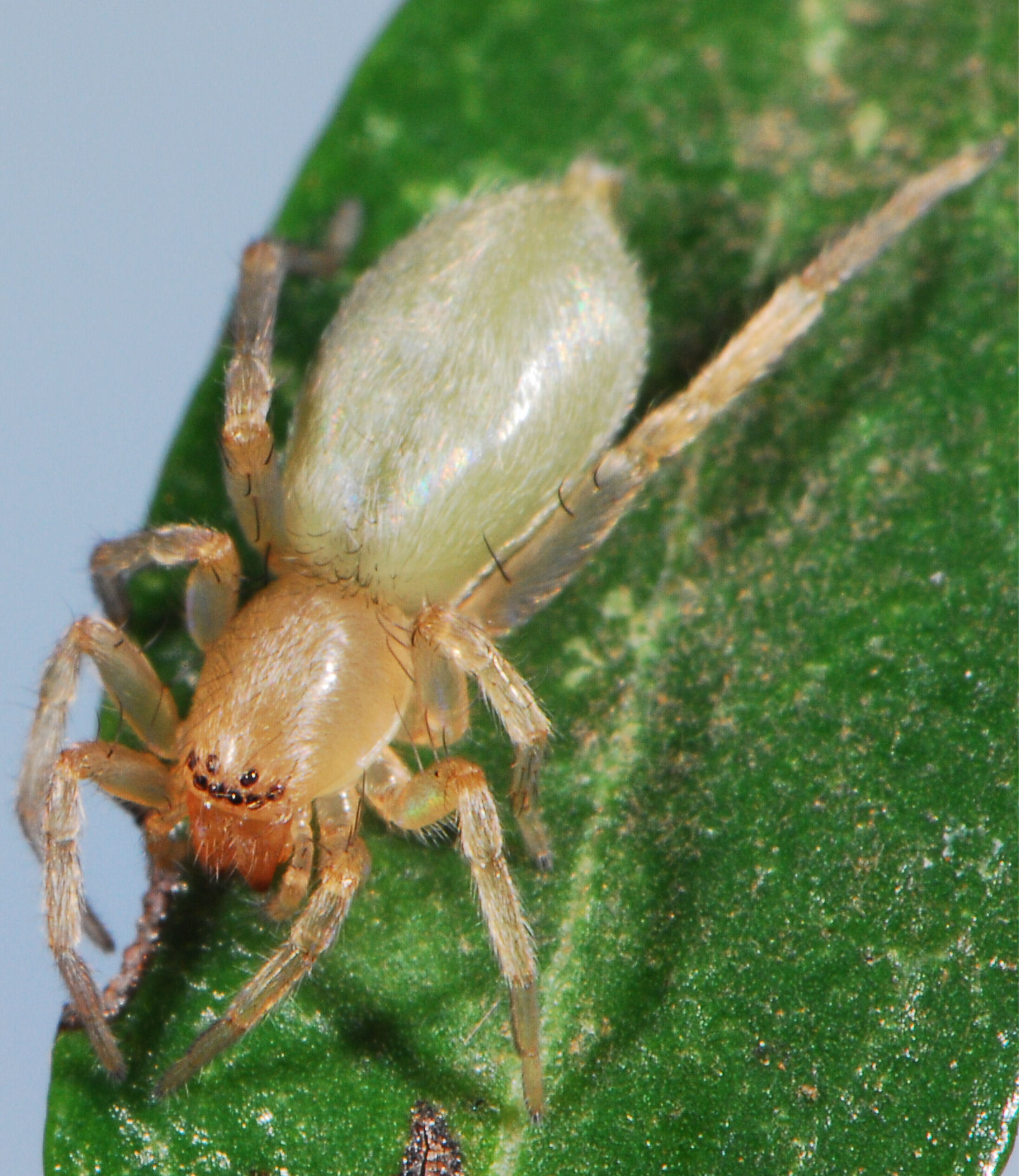
female C. pupillaris

These species have articles on Wikipedia:

- Clubiona abbajensis Strand, 1906 – Ethiopia, Somalia, Uganda, Rwanda, Zimbabwe, South Africa
- Clubiona abboti L. Koch, 1866 – Canada, United States
- Clubiona aducta Simon, 1932 – Portugal, Spain, Italy
- Clubiona africana Lessert, 1921 – Tanzania, South Africa
- Clubiona alpicola Kulczyński, 1882 – France, Central Europe, Italy, Romania, Bulgaria, Ukraine
- Clubiona andreinii Caporiacco, 1936 – Italy
- Clubiona annuligera Lessert, 1929 – DR Congo, Malawi, Mozambique, South Africa
- Clubiona aspidiphora Simon, 1910 – Namibia, South Africa
- Clubiona bevisi Lessert, 1923 – South Africa
- Clubiona biaculeata Simon, 1897 – South Africa
- Clubiona bishopi Edwards, 1958 – Canada, United States
- Clubiona blesti Forster, 1979 – New Zealand
- Clubiona brevipes Blackwall, 1841 – Europe, Turkey, Caucasus, Japan?
- Clubiona cada Forster, 1979 – New Zealand
- Clubiona cambridgei L. Koch, 1873 – New Zealand
- Clubiona canadensis Emerton, 1890 – Canada, United States
- Clubiona capensis Simon, 1897 – South Africa
- Clubiona chathamensis Simon, 1905 – New Zealand (Chatham Is.)
- Clubiona citricolor Lawrence, 1952 – South Africa
- Clubiona clima Forster, 1979 – New Zealand
- Clubiona comta C. L. Koch, 1839 – Europe, North Africa, Turkey, Caucasus
- Clubiona consensa Forster, 1979 – New Zealand
- Clubiona contrita Forster, 1979 – New Zealand
- Clubiona convoluta Forster, 1979 – New Zealand
- Clubiona corticalis (Walckenaer, 1802) – Europe, Turkey, Caucasus
- Clubiona delicata Forster, 1979 – New Zealand
- Clubiona deterrima Strand, 1904 – Norway
- Clubiona durbana Roewer, 1951 – South Africa
- Clubiona facilis O. Pickard-Cambridge, 1911 – Britain (presumably imported)
- Clubiona frutetorum L. Koch, 1867 – Europe to Central Asia
- Clubiona germanica Thorell, 1871 – Europe, Caucasus, Russia (Europe to Far East), Central Asia
- Clubiona godfreyi Lessert, 1921 – Uganda, South Africa
- Clubiona helva Simon, 1897 – South Africa
- Clubiona hilaris Simon, 1878 – Mountains of Spain, France, Italy, Austria, Switzerland, North Macedonia and Romania
- Clubiona huttoni Forster, 1979 – New Zealand
- Clubiona hwanghakensis Paik, 1990 – Korea
- Clubiona johnsoni Gertsch, 1941 – Canada, United States
- Clubiona kastoni Gertsch, 1941 – Alaska, Canada, United States
- Clubiona kiboschensis Lessert, 1921 – Tanzania, South Africa
- Clubiona kulczynskii Lessert, 1905 – North America, Europe, Kazakhstan, Russia (Europe to Far East), Japan
- Clubiona lawrencei Roewer, 1951 – Zimbabwe, South Africa
- Clubiona limpida Simon, 1897 – South Africa
- Clubiona lutescens Westring, 1851 – Europe, Turkey, Caucasus, Russia (Europe to Far East), Iran, Kazakhstan, Korea, Japan. Introduced to North America
- Clubiona maritima L. Koch, 1867 – Canada, United States, Caribbean
- Clubiona marmorata L. Koch, 1866 – France to Ukraine and Turkey
- Clubiona marna Roddy, 1966 – United States
- Clubiona mimula Chamberlin, 1928 – Canada, United States
- Clubiona moesta Banks, 1896 – China, Alaska, Canada, United States
- Clubiona mykolai Mikhailov, 2003 – Bulgaria, Ukraine
- Clubiona natalica Simon, 1897 – South Africa
- Clubiona nemorum Ledoux, 2004 – Réunion
- Clubiona nigromaculosa Blackwall, 1877 – Seychelles, Réunion
- Clubiona nollothensis Simon, 1910 – South Africa
- Clubiona norvegica Strand, 1900 – North America, Europe, Russia (Europe to West Siberia)
- Clubiona obesa Hentz, 1847 – Canada, United States
- Clubiona pacifica Banks, 1896 – Alaska, Canada, United States
- Clubiona pallidula (Clerck, 1757) – Europe, Turkey, Caucasus, Russia (Europe to Far East), Kazakhstan, Central Asia. Introduced to North America (type species)
- Clubiona peculiaris L. Koch, 1873 – New Zealand
- Clubiona pikei Gertsch, 1941 – Canada, United States
- Clubiona pongolensis Lawrence, 1952 – South Africa
- Clubiona producta Forster, 1979 – New Zealand
- Clubiona pseudoneglecta Wunderlich, 1994 – Morocco, Algeria, Europe, Turkey, Caucasus, Iran
- Clubiona pupillaris Lawrence, 1938 – South Africa
- Clubiona pygmaea Banks, 1892 – Canada, United States
- Clubiona revillioidi Lessert, 1936 – Mozambique, South Africa, Eswatini
- Clubiona riparia L. Koch, 1866 – Russia (Urals to Far East), Mongolia, China, Japan, North America
- Clubiona robusta L. Koch, 1873 – Australia
- Clubiona rosserae Locket, 1953 – Britain, France, Netherlands, Poland, Slovakia, Hungary, Romania, Serbia
- Clubiona rumpiana Lawrence, 1952 – South Africa
- Clubiona saltuum Kulczyński, 1898 – Austria
- Clubiona saxatilis L. Koch, 1867 – France to Ukraine and south-eastern Europe
- Clubiona scatula Forster, 1979 – New Zealand
- Clubiona sigillata Lawrence, 1952 – South Africa
- Clubiona silvestris Deeleman-Reinhold, 2001 – Malaysia (Borneo)
- Clubiona sparassella Strand, 1909 – South Africa
- Clubiona spiralis Emerton, 1909 – Canada, United States
- Clubiona subsultans Thorell, 1875 – Europe, Russia (Europe to South Siberia), Japan
- Clubiona subtilis L. Koch, 1867 – Europe, Russia (Europe to Far East), Kyrgyzstan, Korea
- Clubiona subtrivialis Strand, 1906 – Ethiopia, East Africa, South Africa
- Clubiona terrestris Westring, 1851 – Azores, Europe, Turkey
- Clubiona torta Forster, 1979 – New Zealand
- Clubiona trivialis C. L. Koch, 1843 – North America, Europe, Russia (Europe to Far East), China, Japan
- Clubiona umbilensis Lessert, 1923 – South Africa
- Clubiona vachoni Lawrence, 1952 – South Africa
- Clubiona valens Simon, 1897 – South Africa

Complete species list as of October 2025
- C. abbajensis Strand, 1906 – Ethiopia, Somalia, Uganda, Rwanda, Zimbabwe, South Africa
  - C. a. kibonotensis Lessert, 1921 – DR Congo, Uganda, Tanzania
- C. abboti L. Koch, 1866 – Canada, United States
  - C. a. abbotoides Chamberlin & Ivie, 1946 – United States
- C. aberrans Dankittipakul, 2012 – Thailand
- C. abnormis Dankittipakul, 2008 – China, Thailand, Laos
- C. acanthocnemis Simon, 1906 – India
- C. achilles Hogg, 1896 – Australia (Central)
- C. acies Nicolet, 1849 – Chile
- C. aciformis Zhang & Hu, 1991 – China
- C. aculeata Zhang, Zhu & Song, 2007 – China
- C. adjacens Gertsch & Davis, 1936 – United States
- C. aducta Simon, 1932 – Portugal, Spain, Italy
- C. africana Lessert, 1921 – Tanzania, South Africa
- C. akagiensis Hayashi, 1985 – Japan
- C. alexeevi Mikhailov, 1990 – Russia (Caucasus)
- C. aliceae Chickering, 1937 – Panama
- C. allotorta Dankittipakul & Singtripop, 2008 – Thailand
- C. alluaudi Simon, 1898 – Mauritius
- C. alpicola Kulczyński, 1882 – France, Central Europe, Italy, Romania, Bulgaria, Ukraine
- C. alticola Dankittipakul & Singtripop, 2008 – Thailand
- C. altissimoides Liu, Yan, Griswold & Ubick, 2007 – China
- C. altissimus Hu, 2001 – China
- C. alveolata L. Koch, 1873 – Samoa, Funafuti, Marquesas Is. Hawaii
- C. amurensis Mikhailov, 1990 – Russia (Far East), Japan
- C. analis Thorell, 1895 – India, Bangladesh, Myanmar
- C. andreinii Caporiacco, 1936 – Italy
- C. angulata Dondale & Redner, 1976 – Canada
- C. annuligera Lessert, 1929 – DR Congo, Malawi, Mozambique, South Africa
- C. ansa Jang, Bae, Yoo, Lee & Kim, 2021 – Korea
- C. anwarae Biswas & Raychaudhuri, 1996 – Bangladesh
- C. apiata Urquhart, 1893 – Australia (Tasmania)
- C. apiculata Dankittipakul & Singtripop, 2014 – Malaysia (Borneo)
- C. applanata Liu, Yan, Griswold & Ubick, 2007 – China
- C. aspidiphora Simon, 1910 – Namibia, South Africa
- C. asrevida Ono, 1992 – Taiwan
- C. auberginosa Zhang, Yin, Bao & Kim, 1997 – China
- C. australiaca Kolosváry, 1934 – Australia (New South Wales)
- C. bachmaensis Ono, 2009 – Vietnam
- C. bagerhatensis Biswas & Raychaudhuri, 1996 – Bangladesh
- C. baimaensis Song & Zhu, 1991 – China
- C. baishishan Zhang, Zhu & Song, 2003 – China
- C. bakurovi Mikhailov, 1990 – Russia (Far East), China, Korea
- C. bandoi Hayashi, 1995 – Japan
- C. banna Yu & Li, 2021 – China
- C. basarukini Mikhailov, 1990 – Russia (South Siberia, Far East), Mongolia, Japan
- C. bashkirica Mikhailov, 1992 – Russia (Urals, West Siberia)
- C. bengalensis Biswas, 1984 – India
- C. bevisi Lessert, 1923 – South Africa
- C. bi Zhang, Zhong & Gong, 2024 – China
- C. biaculeata Simon, 1897 – South Africa
- C. bicornis Yu & Li, 2019 – China
- C. bicuspidata Wu & Zhang, 2014 – China
- C. bidactylina Wu, Chen & Zhang, 2023 – China
- C. biembolata Deeleman-Reinhold, 2001 – Malaysia (Borneo), Indonesia (Sumatra)
- C. bifissurata Kritscher, 1966 – New Caledonia
- C. biforamina Liu, Peng & Yan, 2016 – China
- C. bifurcata Zhang, Yu & Zhong, 2018 – China
- C. bilobata Dhali, Roy, Saha & Raychaudhuri, 2016 – India
- C. bipinnata Yu, Zhang & Chen, 2017 – China
- C. bishopi Edwards, 1958 – Canada, United States
- C. blesti Forster, 1979 – New Zealand
- C. bomiensis Zhang & Zhu, 2009 – China
- C. boxaensis B. Biswas & K. Biswas, 1992 – India
- C. brevipes Blackwall, 1841 – Europe, Turkey, Caucasus, Japan?
- C. brevispina Huang & Chen, 2012 – Taiwan
- C. bryantae Gertsch, 1941 – Alaska, Canada, United States
- C. bucera Yang, Ma & Zhang, 2011 – China
- C. bukaea (Barrion & Litsinger, 1995) – Philippines
- C. cada Forster, 1979 – New Zealand
- C. caerulescens L. Koch, 1867 – Europe, Russia (Europe to Far East), Kazakhstan, China, Japan
- C. californica Fox, 1938 – United States
- C. calycina Wu & Zhang, 2014 – China
- C. cambridgei L. Koch, 1873 – New Zealand
- C. camela Wu, Chen & Zhang, 2023 – China
- C. campylacantha Dankittipakul, 2008 – Thailand
- C. canaca Berland, 1930 – New Caledonia
- C. canadensis Emerton, 1890 – Canada, United States
- C. canberrana Dondale, 1966 – Australia (New South Wales)
- C. candefacta Nicolet, 1849 – Chile
- C. caohai Zhang & Yu, 2020 – China
- C. capensis Simon, 1897 – South Africa
- C. catawba Gertsch, 1941 – United States
- C. caucasica Mikhailov & Otto, 2017 – Turkey, Caucasus (Russia, Georgia, Armenia, Azerbaijan)
- C. chabarovi Mikhailov, 1991 – Russia (Far East)
- C. chakrabartei Majumder & Tikader, 1991 – India
- C. charitonovi Mikhailov, 1990 – Russia (South Siberia, Far East)
- C. charleneae Barrion & Litsinger, 1995 – Philippines
- C. chathamensis Simon, 1905 – New Zealand (Chatham Is.)
- C. cheni Yu & Li, 2019 – China
- C. chevalieri Berland, 1936 – Cape Verde
- C. chikunii Hayashi, 1986 – Japan
- C. chippewa Gertsch, 1941 – Canada, United States
- C. circulata Zhang & Yin, 1998 – China, Laos, Thailand
- C. cirrosa Ono, 1989 – Japan (Ryukyu Is.)
- C. citricolor Lawrence, 1952 – South Africa
- C. clima Forster, 1979 – New Zealand
- C. cochlearis Yu & Li, 2019 – China
- C. cochleata Wang, Wu & Zhang, 2015 – China
- C. complicata Banks, 1898 – Mexico
- C. comta C. L. Koch, 1839 – Europe, North Africa, Turkey, Caucasus
- C. concinna (Thorell, 1887) – Myanmar
- C. congentilis Kulczyński, 1913 – Slovakia, Ukraine, Russia (Europe to South Siberia), Kazakhstan
- C. conica Dankittipakul & Singtripop, 2014 – Malaysia (Borneo)
- C. consensa Forster, 1979 – New Zealand
- C. contaminata O. Pickard-Cambridge, 1872 – Israel
- C. contrita Forster, 1979 – New Zealand
- C. convoluta Forster, 1979 – New Zealand
- C. cordata Zhang & Zhu, 2009 – China
- C. coreana Paik, 1990 – Russia (Far East), China, Korea, Japan
- C. corrugata Bösenberg & Strand, 1906 – Russia (Far East), China, Taiwan, Korea, Japan, Thailand
- C. corticalis (Walckenaer, 1802) – Europe, Turkey, Caucasus
  - C. c. concolor Kulczyński, 1897 – Hungary
  - C. c. nigra Simon, 1878 – France
- C. cultrata Dankittipakul & Singtripop, 2014 – Indonesia (Borneo)
- C. cycladata Simon, 1909 – Australia (Western Australia)
- C. cylindrata Liu, Yan, Griswold & Ubick, 2007 – China
- C. cylindriformis Dankittipakul & Singtripop, 2014 – Malaysia (Borneo)
- C. dactylina Liu, Peng & Yan, 2016 – China
- C. dakong Zhang & Yu, 2020 – China
- C. damirkovaci Deeleman-Reinhold, 2001 – Malaysia (peninsula)
- C. debilis Nicolet, 1849 – Chile
- C. deletrix O. Pickard-Cambridge, 1885 – Pakistan, India, China?, Taiwan? Japan?
- C. delicata Forster, 1979 – New Zealand
- C. dengpao Yu & Li, 2021 – China
- C. denticulata Dhali, Roy, Saha & Raychaudhuri, 2016 – India
- C. desecheonis Petrunkevitch, 1930 – Puerto Rico
- C. deterrima Strand, 1904 – Norway
- C. dichotoma Wang, Chen & Z. S. Zhang, 2018 – China
- C. didentata Zhang & Yin, 1998 – China
- C. digitata Dankittipakul, 2012 – Thailand
- C. dikita Barrion & Litsinger, 1995 – Philippines
- C. diversa O. Pickard-Cambridge, 1862 – Europe, Turkey, Caucasus, Russia (Europe to Far East), Kazakhstan, Pakistan, Korea, Japan
- C. dorni Sarkar, Quasin & Siliwal, 2023 – India (Himalayas)
- C. drassodes O. Pickard-Cambridge, 1874 – India, Bangladesh, China
- C. dunini Mikhailov, 2003 – Russia (Far East)
- C. duoconcava Zhang & Hu, 1991 – China
- C. durbana Roewer, 1951 – South Africa
- C. dyasia Gertsch, 1941 – United States
- C. dysderiformis (Guérin, 1838) – Indonesia (New Guinea)
- C. elaphines Urquhart, 1893 – Australia (Tasmania)
- C. ericius Chrysanthus, 1967 – Indonesia (New Guinea)
- C. eskovi Mikhailov, 1995 – Russia (Far East)
- C. estes Edwards, 1958 – United States
- C. esuriens Thorell, 1897 – Myanmar
- C. evoronensis Mikhailov, 1995 – Russia (Far East)
- C. excavata (Rainbow, 1920) – Australia (Lord Howe Is.)
- C. excisa O. Pickard-Cambridge, 1898 – Mexico
- C. ezoensis Hayashi, 1987 – Russia (Far East), Japan
- C. facilis O. Pickard-Cambridge, 1911 – Britain (presumably imported)
- C. falcata Tang, Song & Zhu, 2005 – China, Mongolia
- C. falciforma Liu, Peng & Yan, 2016 – China
- C. fanjingshan Wang, Chen & Z. S. Zhang, 2018 – China
- C. femorocalcarata Huang & Chen, 2012 – Taiwan
- C. filicata O. Pickard-Cambridge, 1874 – Pakistan, India, Bangladesh, Myanmar, Thailand, Laos, China, Taiwan
- C. filifera Dankittipakul, 2008 – Thailand
- C. filoramula Zhang & Yin, 1998 – China
- C. flammaformis L. F. Li, Liu, B. Li & Peng, 2023 – China
- C. flavocincta Nicolet, 1849 – Chile
- C. forcipa Yang, Song & Zhu, 2003 – China
- C. frisia Wunderlich & Schuett, 1995 – Europe to Central Asia
- C. frutetorum L. Koch, 1867 – Europe to Central Asia
- C. furcata Emerton, 1919 – Russia (Middle Siberia to Far East), Alaska, Canada, United States, Mexico
- C. fusoidea Zhang, 1992 – China
- C. fuzhouensis Gong, 1985 – China
- C. gallagheri Barrion & Litsinger, 1995 – Indonesia (Java)
- C. germanica Thorell, 1871 – Europe, Caucasus, Russia (Europe to Far East), Central Asia
- C. gertschi Edwards, 1958 – United States
- C. gilva O. Pickard-Cambridge, 1872 – Israel
- C. giulianetti Rainbow, 1898 – Papua New Guinea
- C. glatiosa Saito, 1934 – Japan
- C. globosa Wang, Chen & Z. S. Zhang, 2018 – China
- C. godfreyi Lessert, 1921 – Uganda, South Africa
- C. golovatchi Mikhailov, 1990 – Russia (Europe), Caucasus, Turkey, Iran
- C. gongi Zhang, Yin, Bao & Kim, 1997 – China
- C. gongshan He, Liu & Zhang, 2016 – China
- C. grucollaris Yu, Zhang & Chen, 2017 – China
- C. guianensis Caporiacco, 1947 – Guyana
- C. haeinsensis Paik, 1990 – Russia (Far East), China, Korea, Japan
- C. haplotarsus Simon, 1909 – São Tomé and Príncipe
- C. hatamensis (Thorell, 1881) – Indonesia (New Guinea)
- C. haupti Tang, Song & Zhu, 2005 – China
- C. hedini Schenkel, 1936 – China
- C. helenae Mikhailov, 2003 – Russia (Far East)
- C. helva Simon, 1897 – South Africa
- C. heteroducta Zhang & Yin, 1998 – China
- C. heterosaca Yin, Yan, Gong & Kim, 1996 – China
- C. hexadentata Dhali, Roy, Saha & Raychaudhuri, 2016 – India
- C. hilaris Simon, 1878 – Mountains of Spain, France, Italy, Austria, Switzerland, North Macedonia and Romania
- C. hindu Deeleman-Reinhold, 2001 – Indonesia (Bali)
- C. hitchinsi Saaristo, 2002 – St. Helena, Ascension Island, Seychelles, French Polynesia (Tuamotu)
- C. hoffmanni Schenkel, 1937 – Madagascar
- C. hooda Dong & Zhang, 2016 – China
- C. huaban Xin, Zhang, Li, Zheng & Yu, 2020 – China
- C. hugispaa Barrion & Litsinger, 1995 – Philippines
- C. hugisva Barrion & Litsinger, 1995 – Philippines
- C. huiming Wang, F. Zhang & Z. S. Zhang, 2018 – China
- C. hummeli Schenkel, 1936 – China
- C. hundeshageni Strand, 1907 – Indonesia (Moluccas)
- C. huntianling Yu & Li, 2025 – China
- C. huojianqiang Yu & Li, 2025 – China
- C. huttoni Forster, 1979 – New Zealand
- C. hwanghakensis Paik, 1990 – Korea
- C. hyrcanica Mikhailov, 1990 – Azerbaijan, Iran
- C. hysgina Simon, 1889 – India
- C. hystrix Berland, 1938 – Indonesia (Lesser Sunda Is.), Vanuatu
- C. iharai Ono, 1995 – Japan
- C. ikedai Ono, 1992 – Japan
- C. inaensis Hayashi, 1989 – Japan
- C. inquilina Deeleman-Reinhold, 2001 – Malaysia (Borneo)
- C. insulana Ono, 1989 – Taiwan, Japan (Ryukyu Is.)
- C. interjecta L. Koch, 1879 – Russia (West Siberia to Far East), Mongolia, China
- C. irinae Mikhailov, 1991 – Russia (Far East), China, Korea
- C. jaegeri Ono, 2011 – Palau Is.
- C. janae Edwards, 1958 – United States
- C. japonica L. Koch, 1878 – Russia (Sakhalin, Kurile Is.), China, Korea, Taiwan, Japan
- C. japonicola Bösenberg & Strand, 1906 – Russia (Far East), Korea, Japan, China, Taiwan, Philippines, Indonesia
- C. jiandan Yu & Li, 2019 – China
- C. jiugong Yu & Zhong, 2021 – China
- C. jiulongensis Zhang, Yin & Kim, 1996 – China
- C. johnsoni Gertsch, 1941 – Canada, United States
- C. juvenis Simon, 1878 – Europe, Iran, Uzbekistan
- C. kagani Gertsch, 1941 – United States
- C. kai Jäger & Dankittipakul, 2010 – China, Laos
- C. kaltenbachi Kritscher, 1966 – New Caledonia
- C. kapataganensis Barrion & Litsinger, 1995 – Philippines
- C. kasanensis Paik, 1990 – Korea, Japan
- C. kastoni Gertsch, 1941 – Alaska, Canada, United States
- C. kasurensis Mukhtar & Mushtaq, 2005 – Pakistan
- C. katioryza Barrion & Litsinger, 1995 – Philippines
- C. kawitpaaia (Barrion & Litsinger, 1995) – Philippines
- C. kayashimai Ono, 1994 – Taiwan
- C. kiboschensis Lessert, 1921 – Tanzania, South Africa
- C. kigabensis Strand, 1915 – East Africa
- C. kimyongkii Paik, 1990 – Russia (Far East), China, Korea
- C. kiowa Gertsch, 1941 – Canada, United States, Mexico
- C. komissarovi Mikhailov, 1992 – Russia (Far East), Korea
- C. kowong Chrysanthus, 1967 – Indonesia (New Guinea)
- C. krisisensis Barrion & Litsinger, 1995 – Philippines, Indonesia (Borneo)
- C. kropfi Zhang, Zhu & Song, 2003 – China
- C. kuanshanensis Ono, 1994 – Taiwan
- C. kularensis Marusik & Koponen, 2002 – Russia (north-eastern Siberia, Far East)
- C. kulczynskii Lessert, 1905 – North America, Europe, Kazakhstan, Russia (Europe to Far East), Japan
- C. kumadaorum Ono, 1992 – Japan
- C. kunashirensis Mikhailov, 1990 – Russia (Sakhalin, Kurile Is.), Japan
- C. kurenshikovi Mikhailov, 1995 – Russia (Far East)
- C. kurilensis Bösenberg & Strand, 1906 – Russia (Far East), Korea, Japan, China, Taiwan
- C. kurosawai Ono, 1986 – Korea, Japan, China, Taiwan
- C. kuu Jäger & Dankittipakul, 2010 – Laos
- C. lala Jäger & Dankittipakul, 2010 – China, Laos
- C. lamellaris Zhang, Yu & Zhong, 2018 – China
- C. lamina Zhang, Zhu & Song, 2007 – China
- C. langei Mikhailov, 1991 – Russia (Far East)
- C. latericia Kulczyński, 1926 – Russia (Middle Siberia to Far East), Mongolia, Alaska
- C. laticeps O. Pickard-Cambridge, 1885 – Pakistan
- C. latitans Pavesi, 1883 – Ethiopia, Somalia, Kenya
- C. laudabilis Simon, 1909 – Australia (Western Australia)
- C. lawrencei Roewer, 1951 – Zimbabwe, South Africa
- C. lena Bösenberg & Strand, 1906 – China, Korea, Japan
- C. leonilae Barrion & Litsinger, 1995 – Philippines
- C. leptosa Zhang, Yin, Bao & Kim, 1997 – China
- C. liachviana Mcheidze, 1997 – Caucasus (Russia, Georgia, Armenia, Azerbaijan), Iran, Turkmenistan
- C. liminal Sherwood, 2025 – China, Korea
- C. limpida Simon, 1897 – South Africa
- C. linea Xie, Yin, Yan & Kim, 1996 – China
- C. linzhiensis Hu, 2001 – China
- C. lirata Yang, Song & Zhu, 2003 – China
- C. littoralis Banks, 1895 – Canada, United States
- C. logunovi Mikhailov, 1990 – Russia (Far East)
- C. longipes Nicolet, 1849 – Chile
- C. longyangensis Guo, Li & Zhang, 2025 – China
- C. luapalana Giltay, 1935 – DR Congo
- C. lucida He, Liu & Zhang, 2016 – China
- C. ludhianaensis Tikader, 1976 – India, Bangladesh
- C. lui X. Y. Zhang, Li & Z. S. Zhang, 2025 – China
- C. lutescens Westring, 1851 – Europe, Turkey, Caucasus, Russia (Europe to Far East), Iran, Kazakhstan, Korea, Japan. Introduced to North America
- C. lyriformis Song & Zhu, 1991 – China
- C. maculata Roewer, 1951 – Australia (Queensland)
- C. mahensis Simon, 1893 – Seychelles
- C. maipai Jäger & Dankittipakul, 2010 – Thailand
- C. mandschurica Schenkel, 1953 – Russia (Far East), China, Korea, Japan
- C. manshanensis Zhu & An, 1988 – China
- C. maracandica Kroneberg, 1875 – Uzbekistan
- C. maritima L. Koch, 1867 – Canada, United States, Caribbean
- C. marmorata L. Koch, 1866 – France to Ukraine and Turkey
- C. marna Roddy, 1966 – United States
- C. marusiki Mikhailov, 1990 – Russia (Far East)
- C. maya Hayashi & Yoshida, 1991 – Japan
- C. maysangarta Barrion & Litsinger, 1995 – Philippines
- C. mayumiae Ono, 1993 – Russia (Far East), Korea, Japan
- C. mazandaranica Mikhailov, 2003 – Azerbaijan, Iran
- C. medog Zhang, Zhu & Song, 2007 – China
- C. melanosticta Thorell, 1890 – India, China, Myanmar, Thailand, Laos, Thailand, Indonesia, Papua New Guinea
- C. menglun Yu & Li, 2021 – China
- C. meraukensis Chrysanthus, 1967 – Malaysia, Indonesia (New Guinea)
- C. microsapporensis Mikhailov, 1990 – Russia (Far East), Korea
- C. mii Yu & Li, 2021 – China
- C. mikhailovi Deeleman-Reinhold, 2001 – Indonesia (Java)
- C. milingae Barrion-Dupo, Barrion & Heong, 2013 – China (Hainan)
- C. mimula Chamberlin, 1928 – Canada, United States
- C. minima (Ono, 2010) – Korea, Japan
- C. minuscula Nicolet, 1849 – Chile
- C. minuta Nicolet, 1849 – Chile
- C. mixta Emerton, 1890 – Canada, United States
- C. modesta L. Koch, 1873 – Australia (Queensland)
- C. moesta Banks, 1896 – China, Alaska, Canada, United States
- C. moralis Song & Zhu, 1991 – China, Taiwan
- C. mordica O. Pickard-Cambridge, 1898 – Mexico
- C. mujibari Biswas & Raychaudhuri, 1996 – Bangladesh
- C. multidentata Liu, Peng & Yan, 2016 – China
- C. multiprocessa Guo, Li & Zhang, 2025 – China
- C. munda Thorell, 1887 – Myanmar
- C. munis Simon, 1909 – Australia (Western Australia)
- C. mutata Gertsch, 1941 – Canada, United States
- C. mutilata Bösenberg & Strand, 1906 – Japan
- C. mykolai Mikhailov, 2003 – Bulgaria, Ukraine
- C. nataliae Trilikauskas, 2007 – Russia (Far East)
- C. natalica Simon, 1897 – South Africa
- C. neglecta O. Pickard-Cambridge, 1862 – Europe, Turkey, Caucasus, Russia (Europe to South Siberia), Iran, Central Asia, China, Korea
- C. neglectoides Bösenberg & Strand, 1906 – China, Korea, Japan
- C. nemorum Ledoux, 2004 – Réunion
- C. nenilini Mikhailov, 1995 – Russia (South Siberia)
- C. neocaledonica Berland, 1924 – New Caledonia
- C. newnani Ivie & Barrows, 1935 – United States
- C. nezha Yu & Li, 2025 – China
- C. nicholsi Gertsch, 1941 – Canada, United States
- C. nicobarensis Tikader, 1977 – India (Nicobar Is.)
- C. nigromaculosa Blackwall, 1877 – Seychelles, Réunion
- C. nilgherina Simon, 1906 – India
- C. ningpoensis Schenkel, 1944 – China
- C. nollothensis Simon, 1910 – South Africa
- C. norvegica Strand, 1900 – North America, Europe, Russia (Europe to West Siberia)
- C. notabilis L. Koch, 1873 – Australia (Queensland)
- C. obesa Hentz, 1847 – Canada, United States
- C. oceanica Ono, 2011 – Japan
- C. octoginta Dankittipakul, 2008 – Thailand
- C. odelli Edwards, 1958 – United States
- C. odesanensis Paik, 1990 – Russia (Far East), China, Korea
- C. ogatai Ono, 1995 – Japan
- C. oligerae Mikhailov, 1995 – Russia (Far East)
- C. opeongo Edwards, 1958 – Canada
- C. orientalis Mikhailov, 1995 – North Korea
- C. oteroana Gertsch, 1941 – United States
- C. ovalis Zhang, 1991 – China
- C. pacifica Banks, 1896 – Alaska, Canada, United States
- C. paenuliformis (Strand, 1916) – Ghana
- C. pahilistapyasea Barrion & Litsinger, 1995 – Thailand, Indonesia (Borneo), Philippines
- C. paiki Mikhailov, 1991 – Russia (Far East)
- C. pala Deeleman-Reinhold, 2001 – Indonesia (Moluccas)
- C. pallidula (Clerck, 1757) – Europe, Turkey, Caucasus, Russia (Europe to Far East), Kazakhstan, Central Asia. Introduced to North America (type species)
- C. pandalira (Barrion-Dupo, Barrion & Heong, 2013) – China
- C. pantherina Chrysanthus, 1967 – Indonesia (New Guinea)
- C. papillata Schenkel, 1936 – Russia (Far East), China, Korea
- C. papuana Chrysanthus, 1967 – Indonesia (New Guinea)
- C. paralena Mikhailov, 1995 – North Korea
- C. parallela Hu & Li, 1987 – China
- C. paranghinlalakirta Barrion & Litsinger, 1995 – Philippines
- C. parangunikarta Barrion & Litsinger, 1995 – Philippines
- C. parconcinna Deeleman-Reinhold, 2001 – China, Thailand, Indonesia (Borneo)
- C. parva Seo, 2018 – Korea
- C. parvula Saito, 1933 – Japan
- C. peculiaris L. Koch, 1873 – New Zealand
- C. phansa Strand, 1911 – Indonesia (Aru Is.)
- C. phragmitis C. L. Koch, 1843 – Morocco, Algeria, Europe, Caucasus, Russia (Europe to Far East), Iran, Central Asia, China, Korea
- C. phragmitoides Schenkel, 1963 – China
- C. pianmaensis Wang, Wu & Zhang, 2015 – China
- C. picturata Deeleman-Reinhold, 2001 – Indonesia (Bali)
- C. pikei Gertsch, 1941 – Canada, United States
- C. pila Dhali, Roy, Saha & Raychaudhuri, 2016 – India
- C. plumbi Gertsch, 1941 – United States
- C. pogonias Simon, 1906 – India
- C. pollicaris Wu, Zheng & Zhang, 2015 – China
- C. pomoa Gertsch, 1941 – United States
- C. pongolensis Lawrence, 1952 – South Africa
- C. pototanensis Barrion & Litsinger, 1995 – Philippines
- C. praematura Emerton, 1909 – Russia (Far East), Alaska, Canada, United States
- C. procera Chrysanthus, 1967 – Indonesia (New Guinea)
- C. procteri Gertsch, 1941 – United States
- C. producta Forster, 1979 – New Zealand
- C. propinqua L. Koch, 1879 – Russia (Middle Siberia to Far East), North Korea, China
- C. proszynskii Mikhailov, 1995 – North Korea
- C. pruvotae Berland, 1930 – New Caledonia
- C. pseudocordata Dhali, Roy, Saha & Raychaudhuri, 2016 – India
- C. pseudogermanica Schenkel, 1936 – Russia (Far East), China, Korea, Japan
- C. pseudomaxillata Hogg, 1915 – Indonesia (New Guinea)
- C. pseudoneglecta Wunderlich, 1994 – Morocco, Algeria, Europe, Turkey, Caucasus, Iran
- C. pseudopteroneta Raven & Stumkat, 2002 – Australia (Queensland)
- C. pseudosaxatilis Mikhailov, 1992 – Russia (Central Asia, South Siberia), Kazakhstan
- C. pseudosimilis Mikhailov, 1990 – Algeria, Portugal, Greece (Crete), Turkey, Caucasus
- C. pterogona Yang, Song & Zhu, 2003 – China
- C. puera Nicolet, 1849 – Chile
- C. pupillaris Lawrence, 1938 – South Africa
- C. pupula Thorell, 1897 – Myanmar
- C. pygmaea Banks, 1892 – Canada, United States
- C. pyrifera Schenkel, 1936 – China
- C. qiankunquan Yu & Li, 2025 – China
- C. qianlei J. S. Zhang, F. Zhang & Yu, 2022 – China
- C. qini Tang, Song & Zhu, 2005 – China
- C. qiyunensis Xu, Yang & Song, 2003 – China
- C. quebecana Dondale & Redner, 1976 – Canada, United States
- C. rainbowi Roewer, 1951 – Australia (Lord Howe Is.)
- C. rama Dankittipakul & Singtripop, 2008 – India, Thailand, China
- C. ramoiensis (Thorell, 1881) – Papua New Guinea
- C. rava Simon, 1886 – Senegal
- C. reclusa O. Pickard-Cambridge, 1863 – Europe, Turkey, Russia (Europe to South Siberia), Georgia, Kazakhstan
- C. reichlini Schenkel, 1944 – China, Taiwan? Japan?
- C. revillioidi Lessert, 1936 – Mozambique, South Africa, Eswatini
- C. rhododendri Barrows, 1945 – United States
- C. rileyi Gertsch, 1941 – United States
- C. riparia L. Koch, 1866 – Russia (Urals to Far East), Mongolia, China, Japan, North America
- C. risbeci Berland, 1930 – New Caledonia
- C. rivalis Pavesi, 1883 – Ethiopia
- C. robusta L. Koch, 1873 – Australia
- C. roeweri Caporiacco, 1940 – Ethiopia
- C. rosserae Locket, 1953 – Britain, France, Netherlands, Poland, Slovakia, Hungary, Romania, Serbia
- C. rostrata Paik, 1985 – Russia (Far East), China, Korea, Japan
- C. rothschildi Berland, 1922 – Ethiopia
- C. rouqiu Yu & Li, 2025 – China
- C. rumpiana Lawrence, 1952 – South Africa
- C. rybini Mikhailov, 1992 – Kazakhstan, Kyrgyzstan
- C. ryukyuensis Ono, 1989 – Japan (Ryukyu Is.)
- C. saltitans Emerton, 1919 – Canada, United States
- C. saltuum Kulczyński, 1898 – Austria
- C. samoensis Berland, 1929 – Samoa, French Polynesia (Society Is., Austral Is.: Rapa)
- C. sapporensis Hayashi, 1986 – Russia (Far East), Korea, Japan
- C. saurica Mikhailov, 1992 – Kazakhstan
- C. savesi Berland, 1930 – New Caledonia
- C. saxatilis L. Koch, 1867 – France to Ukraine and south-eastern Europe
- C. scandens Deeleman-Reinhold, 2001 – Malaysia (Borneo)
- C. scatula Forster, 1979 – New Zealand
- C. scenica Nicolet, 1849 – Chile
- C. semicircularis Tang, Song & Zhu, 2005 – China, Korea
- C. sertungensis Hayashi, 1996 – Indonesia (Krakatau)
- C. shillongensis Majumder & Tikader, 1991 – India
- C. shuangsi Yu & Li, 2021 – China
- C. sichotanica Mikhailov, 2003 – Russia (Far East)
- C. sigillata Lawrence, 1952 – South Africa
- C. silvestris Deeleman-Reinhold, 2001 – Malaysia (Borneo)
- C. similis L. Koch, 1867 – Europe, Turkey, Caucasus
- C. sjostedti Lessert, 1921 – Tanzania
  - C. s. spinigera Lessert, 1921 – Tanzania
- C. sopaikensis Paik, 1990 – Russia (Far East), Korea
- C. sparassella Strand, 1909 – South Africa
- C. spiralis Emerton, 1909 – Canada, United States
- C. stagnatilis Kulczyński, 1897 – Europe, Caucasus, Russia (Europe to South Siberia), Central Asia
- C. stiligera Deeleman-Reinhold, 2001 – Indonesia (Sumatra)
- C. straminea O. Pickard-Cambridge, 1872 – Israel
- C. subapplanata Wang, Chen & Z. S. Zhang, 2018 – China
- C. subasrevida Yu & Li, 2019 – China
- C. subborealis Mikhailov, 1992 – Russia (South Siberia, Far East), Mongolia
- C. subcylindrata Wang, Chen & Z. S. Zhang, 2018 – China
- C. subdidentata Yu & Li, 2021 – China
- C. subhuiming Wu, Chen & Zhang, 2023 – China
- C. subkuu Yu & Li, 2019 – China
- C. submaculata (Thorell, 1891) – India (Nicobar Is.)
- C. submoralis Wu, Zheng & Zhang, 2015 – China
- C. subnotabilis Strand, 1907 – Australia
- C. subparallela Zhang, Zhu & Song, 2007 – China
- C. subquebecana Yu & Li, 2019 – China
- C. subrama Yu & Li, 2019 – China
- C. subrostrata Zhang & Hu, 1991 – China
- C. subsultans Thorell, 1875 – Europe, Russia (Europe to South Siberia), Japan
- C. subtilis L. Koch, 1867 – Europe, Russia (Europe to Far East), Kyrgyzstan, Korea
- C. subtongi Yu & Li, 2021 – China
- C. subtrivialis Strand, 1906 – Ethiopia, East Africa, South Africa
- C. subyaginumai Yu & Li, 2019 – China
- C. subyangmingensis Gan & Wang, 2020 – China
- C. suthepica Dankittipakul, 2008 – China, Thailand
- C. tabupumensis Petrunkevitch, 1914 – Myanmar
- C. taiwanica Ono, 1994 – China, Taiwan
- C. tangi Liu, Peng & Yan, 2016 – China
- C. tanikawai Ono, 1989 – China, Taiwan, Japan (Ryukyu Is.)
- C. tateyamensis Hayashi, 1989 – Japan
- C. tenera (Thorell, 1890) – Indonesia (Sumatra, Java)
- C. tengchong Zhang, Zhu & Song, 2007 – China
- C. ternatensis (Thorell, 1881) – Indonesia (Moluccas)
- C. terrestris Westring, 1851 – Azores, Europe, Turkey
- C. theoblicki Yu & Li, 2019 – China
- C. thorelli Roewer, 1951 – Indonesia (Sumatra)
- C. tiane Yu & Li, 2019 – China
- C. tianpingshan L. F. Li, Liu, B. Li & Peng, 2023 – China
- C. tiantongensis Zhang, Yin & Kim, 1996 – China
- C. tikaderi Majumder & Tikader, 1991 – India
- C. tixing Yu & Li, 2021 – China
- C. tongdaoensis Zhang, Yin, Bao & Kim, 1997 – China, Korea
- C. tongi Yu & Li, 2019 – China
- C. topakea Barrion & Litsinger, 1995 – Philippines
- C. torta Forster, 1979 – New Zealand
- C. tortuosa Zhang & Yin, 1998 – China
- C. transbaicalica Mikhailov, 1992 – Russia (South Siberia)
- C. tricuspidata X. Y. Zhang, Li & Z. S. Zhang, 2025 – China
- C. tridentata Dhali, Roy, Saha & Raychaudhuri, 2016 – India
- C. trivialis C. L. Koch, 1843 – North America, Europe, Russia (Europe to Far East), China, Japan
- C. tsurusakii Hayashi, 1987 – Russia (Kurile Is.), Japan
- C. turongdaliriana (Barrion & Litsinger, 1995) – Philippines
- C. uenoi Ono, 1986 – Japan
- C. umbilensis Lessert, 1923 – South Africa
- C. unanoa Barrion & Litsinger, 1995 – Philippines
- C. unikarta Barrion & Litsinger, 1995 – Philippines
- C. uniyali Sarkar, Quasin & Siliwal, 2023 – India (Himalayas)
- C. upoluensis Marples, 1964 – Samoa
- C. vachoni Lawrence, 1952 – South Africa
- C. vacuna L. Koch, 1873 – Papua New Guinea, Australia (Queensland)
- C. valens Simon, 1897 – South Africa
- C. venatoria Rainbow & Pulleine, 1920 – Australia (Lord Howe Is.)
- C. venusae Barrion & Litsinger, 1995 – Philippines
- C. victoriaensis Barrion & Litsinger, 1995 – Philippines
- C. vigil Karsch, 1879 – Russia (Sakhalin, Kurile Is.), Korea, China, Japan
- C. vigillella Strand, 1918 – Japan
- C. violaceovittata Schenkel, 1936 – China
- C. wangchengi Yu & Li, 2021 – China
- C. wolongica Zhu & An, 1999 – China
- C. wulingensis Yu & Chen, 2017 – China
- C. xianning Zhong & Yu, 2022 – China
- C. xiaoci Yu & Li, 2021 – China
- C. xiaokong Yu & Li, 2021 – China
- C. yaginumai Hayashi, 1989 – China, Taiwan, Japan
- C. yangmingensis Hayashi & Yoshida, 1993 – Taiwan
- C. yanzhii Zhang & Yu, 2020 – China
- C. yaoi Yu & Li, 2019 – China
- C. yaroslavi Mikhailov, 2003 – Russia (Far East)
- C. yasudai Ono, 1991 – Japan
- C. yejiei Yu & Li, 2021 – China
- C. yintiaoling X. Y. Zhang, Li & Z. S. Zhang, 2025 – China
- C. yinyangjian Yu & Li, 2025 – China
- C. yoshidai Hayashi, 1989 – Japan
- C. yueya Yu & Li, 2019 – China
- C. yurii Mikhailov, 2011 – Mongolia
- C. zacharovi Mikhailov, 1991 – Russia (Far East), Korea
- C. zandstrai Barrion & Litsinger, 1995 – Philippines
- C. zhanggureni Yu & Li, 2019 – China
- C. zhangmuensis Hu & Li, 1987 – China
- C. zhangyongjingi Li & Blick, 2019 – China
- C. zhaoi Yu & Li, 2021 – China
- C. zhengi Yu & Li, 2019 – China
- C. zhigangi Yu & Li, 2021 – China
- C. zhui Xu, Yang & Song, 2003 – China
- C. zilla Dönitz & Strand, 1906 – Japan
- C. zimmermanni Marples, 1964 – Samoa
- C. zyuzini Mikhailov, 1995 – Russia (Far East)
