= Clubiona saltuum =

Scientific classification
- Kingdom: Animalia
- Phylum: Arthropoda
- Subphylum: Chelicerata
- Class: Arachnida
- Order: Araneae
- Infraorder: Araneomorphae
- Family: Clubionidae
- Genus: Clubiona
- Species: C. saltuum

Binomial name
- Clubiona saltuum Kulczynski, 1898

Species of spider

Clubiona saltuum is a sac spider species found in Austria. It was described by Władysław Kulczyński in 1898.
