= Clubiona delicata =

Conservation status
- Not Threatened (NZ TCS)

Scientific classification
- Kingdom: Animalia
- Phylum: Arthropoda
- Subphylum: Chelicerata
- Class: Arachnida
- Order: Araneae
- Infraorder: Araneomorphae
- Family: Clubionidae
- Genus: Clubiona
- Species: C. delicata

Binomial name
- Clubiona delicata Forster, 1979

Species of spider

Clubiona delicata is a species of Clubionidae spider endemic to New Zealand.

== Taxonomy ==
This species was described in 1979 by Ray Forster from male and female specimens. The holotype is stored in Otago Museum.

== Description ==
The male is recorded at 3.8mm in length whereas the female is 3.7mm. The carapace is pale brown while the legs are paler. The abdomen is covered in spots dorsally and ventrally (less dense on the latter).

== Distribution ==
This species is only known from Hawkes Bay, New Zealand.

== Conservation status ==
Under the New Zealand Threat Classification System, this species is listed as "Not Threatened".
