= Clubiona abbajensis =

Abbajensis Short Legged Sac Spider

Conservation status
- Least Concern (SANBI Red List)

Scientific classification
- Kingdom: Animalia
- Phylum: Arthropoda
- Subphylum: Chelicerata
- Class: Arachnida
- Order: Araneae
- Infraorder: Araneomorphae
- Family: Clubionidae
- Genus: Clubiona
- Species: C. abbajensis

Binomial name
- Clubiona abbajensis Strand, 1906

Synonyms
- Clubiona abbajensis karisimbiensis Strand, 1916

Species of spider

Clubiona abbajensis is a species of spider in the family Clubionidae. It is an African endemic species with a wide distribution across multiple countries including Ethiopia, Somalia, Uganda, Rwanda, Zimbabwe, and South Africa.

== Etymology ==
The species name abbajensis refers to the type locality in Ethiopia where it was first described.

== Distribution ==
Clubiona abbajensis has a wide distribution across Africa. In South Africa, the species is widespread, occurring in five provinces at elevations ranging from sea level to 1646 m. It has been recorded from the Eastern Cape, KwaZulu-Natal, Limpopo, Mpumalanga, and Western Cape provinces.

== Habitat ==
The species is a free-living plant dweller found in the Fynbos, Grassland, Savanna and Thicket biomes. It has also been collected from agricultural settings including avocado, citrus, lemon, and macadamia orchards.

== Description ==
Both sexes are known to science.

== Conservation ==
The species is listed as Least Concern due to its wide geographical range across multiple African countries. In South Africa, it is protected in more than ten protected areas.
