= List of Clubionidae species =

This page lists all described species of the spider family Clubionidae accepted by the World Spider Catalog as of November 2024:

== A ==
=== Arabellata ===
Arabellata Baert, Versteirt & Jocqué, 2010

- A. nimispalpata Baert, Versteirt & Jocqué, 2010 (type) — New Guinea
- A. terebrata Baert, Versteirt & Jocqué, 2010 — New Guinea

== B ==
=== Bucliona ===
Bucliona Benoit, 1977

- B. dubia (O. Pickard-Cambridge, 1870) (type) — St. Helena
- B. jucunda (Karsch, 1879) — Russia (Far East), Korea, Japan, China, Taiwan
- B. kirilli Yu & Li, 2021 — Kenya

== C ==
=== Carteronius ===
Carteronius Simon, 1897

- C. argenticomus (Keyserling, 1877) — Madagascar
- C. fuscus Simon, 1896 — Mauritius
- C. helluo Simon, 1896 (type) — Sierra Leone
- C. vittiger Simon, 1896 — Madagascar

=== † Chiapasona ===
† Chiapasona Petrunkevitch, 1963

- † C. defuncta Petrunkevitch, 1963

=== Clubiona ===
Clubiona Latreille, 1804

- C. abbajensis Strand, 1906 — Ethiopia, Somalia, Central, East Africa
  - C. a. kibonotensis Lessert, 1921 — East Africa
- C. abboti L. Koch, 1866 — USA, Canada
  - C. a. abbotoides Chamberlin & Ivie, 1946 — USA
- C. aberrans Dankittipakul, 2012 — Thailand
- C. abnormis Dankittipakul, 2008 — Thailand, Laos
- C. acanthocnemis Simon, 1906 — India
- C. achilles Hogg, 1896 — Australia (Central)
- C. acies Nicolet, 1849 — Chile
- C. aciformis Zhang & Hu, 1991 — China
- C. aculeata Zhang, Zhu & Song, 2007 — China
- C. adjacens Gertsch & Davis, 1936 — USA
- C. aducta Simon, 1932 — Portugal, Spain, Italy
- C. africana Lessert, 1921 — East Africa
- C. akagiensis Hayashi, 1985 — Japan
- C. alexeevi Mikhailov, 1990 — Russia (Caucasus)
- C. aliceae Chickering, 1937 — Panama
- C. allotorta Dankittipakul & Singtripop, 2008 — Thailand
- C. alluaudi Simon, 1898 — Mauritius
- C. alpicola Kulczyński, 1882 — Europe to Central Asia
- C. alticola Dankittipakul & Singtripop, 2008 — Thailand
- C. altissimoides Liu, Yan, Griswold & Ubick, 2007 — China
- C. altissimus Hu, 2001 — China
- C. alveolata L. Koch, 1873 — Samoa, Funafuti, Marquesas Is., Hawaii
- C. amurensis Mikhailov, 1990 — Russia (Far East), Japan
- C. analis Thorell, 1895 — India, Bangladesh, Myanmar
- C. andreinii Caporiacco, 1936 — Italy
- C. angulata Dondale & Redner, 1976 — Canada
- C. annuligera Lessert, 1929 — Congo, Mozambique
- C. ansa Jang, Bae, Yoo, Lee & Kim, 2021 — Korea
- C. anwarae Biswas & Raychaudhuri, 1996 — Bangladesh
- C. apiata Urquhart, 1893 — Australia (Tasmania)
- C. apiculata Dankittipakul & Singtripop, 2014 — Malaysia (Borneo)
- C. applanata Liu, Yan, Griswold & Ubick, 2007 — China
- C. aspidiphora Simon, 1910 — South Africa
- C. asrevida Ono, 1992 — Taiwan
- C. auberginosa Zhang, Yin, Bao & Kim, 1997 — China
- C. australiaca Kolosváry, 1934 — Australia (New South Wales)
- C. bachmaensis Ono, 2009 — Vietnam
- C. bagerhatensis Biswas & Raychaudhuri, 1996 — Bangladesh
- C. baimaensis Song & Zhu, 1991 — China
- C. baishishan Zhang, Zhu & Song, 2003 — China
- C. bakurovi Mikhailov, 1990 — Russia (Far East), China, Korea
- C. bandoi Hayashi, 1995 — Japan
- C. basarukini Mikhailov, 1990 — Russia (South Siberia, Far East), Mongolia, Japan
- C. bashkirica Mikhailov, 1992 — Russia (Urals, West Siberia)
- C. bengalensis Biswas, 1984 — India
- C. bevisi Lessert, 1923 — South Africa
- C. bi Zhang, Zhong & Gong, 2024 — China
- C. biaculeata Simon, 1897 — South Africa
- C. bicornis Yu & Li, 2019 — China
- C. bicuspidata Wu & Zhang, 2014 — China
- C. bidactylina Wu, Chen & Zhang, 2023 — China
- C. biembolata Deeleman-Reinhold, 2001 — Malaysia (Borneo), Indonesia (Sumatra)
- C. bifissurata Kritscher, 1966 — New Caledonia
- C. biforamina Liu, Peng & Yan, 2016 — China
- C. bifurcata Zhang, Yu & Zhong, 2018 — China
- C. bilobata Dhali, Roy, Saha & Raychaudhuri, 2016 — India
- C. bipinnata Yu, Zhang & Chen, 2017 — China
- C. bishopi Edwards, 1958 — USA, Canada
- C. blesti Forster, 1979 — New Zealand
- C. bomiensis Zhang & Zhu, 2009 — China
- C. boxaensis Biswas & Biswas, 1992 — India
- C. brachyptera Zhu & Chen, 2012 — China (Hainan)
- C. brevipes Blackwall, 1841 — Europe, Caucasus, Japan?
- C. brevispina Huang & Chen, 2012 — Taiwan
- C. bryantae Gertsch, 1941 — USA, Canada
- C. bucera Yang, Ma & Zhang, 2011 — China
- C. bukaea (Barrion & Litsinger, 1995) — Philippines
- C. cada Forster, 1979 — New Zealand
- C. caerulescens L. Koch, 1867 — Europe, Russia (Europe to Far East), Kazakhstan, China, Japan
- C. californica Fox, 1938 — USA
- C. calycina Wu & Zhang, 2014 — China
- C. cambridgei L. Koch, 1873 — New Zealand
- C. camela Wu, Chen & Zhang, 2023 — China
- C. campylacantha Dankittipakul, 2008 — Thailand
- C. canaca Berland, 1930 — New Caledonia
- C. canadensis Emerton, 1890 — USA, Canada
- C. canberrana Dondale, 1966 — Australia (New South Wales)
- C. candefacta Nicolet, 1849 — Chile
- C. caohai Zhang & Yu, 2020 — China
- C. capensis Simon, 1897 — South Africa
- C. catawba Gertsch, 1941 — USA
- C. caucasica Mikhailov & Otto, 2017 — Caucasus (Georgia, Armenia, Azerbaijan, Russia), Turkey
- C. chabarovi Mikhailov, 1991 — Russia (Far East)
- C. chakrabartei Majumder & Tikader, 1991 — India
- C. charitonovi Mikhailov, 1990 — Russia (South Siberia, Far East)
- C. charleneae Barrion & Litsinger, 1995 — Philippines
- C. chathamensis Simon, 1905 — New Zealand (Chatham Is.)
- C. cheni Yu & Li, 2019 — China
- C. chevalieri Berland, 1936 — Cape Verde Is.
- C. chikunii Hayashi, 1986 — Japan
- C. chippewa Gertsch, 1941 — USA, Canada
- C. circulata Zhang & Yin, 1998 — China
- C. cirrosa Ono, 1989 — Japan (Ryukyu Is.)
- C. citricolor Lawrence, 1952 — South Africa
- C. clima Forster, 1979 — New Zealand
- C. cochlearis Yu & Li, 2019 — China
- C. cochleata Wang, Wu & Zhang, 2015 — China
- C. complicata Banks, 1898 — Mexico
- C. comta C. L. Koch, 1839 — Europe, North Africa, Turkey, Caucasus
- C. concinna (Thorell, 1887) — Myanmar
- C. congentilis Kulczyński, 1913 — Central Europe to Central Asia
- C. conica Dankittipakul & Singtripop, 2014 — Malaysia (Borneo)
- C. consensa Forster, 1979 — New Zealand
- C. contaminata O. Pickard-Cambridge, 1872 — Israel
- C. contrita Forster, 1979 — New Zealand
- C. convoluta Forster, 1979 — New Zealand
- C. cordata Zhang & Zhu, 2009 — China
- C. coreana Paik, 1990 — Russia (Far East), China, Korea
- C. corrugata Bösenberg & Strand, 1906 — Russia (Far East), China, Taiwan, Korea, Japan, Thailand
- C. corticalis (Walckenaer, 1802) — Europe, Turkey, Caucasus
  - C. c. concolor Kulczyński, 1897 — Hungary
  - C. c. nigra Simon, 1878 — France
- C. cultrata Dankittipakul & Singtripop, 2014 — Indonesia (Borneo)
- C. cycladata Simon, 1909 — Australia (Western Australia)
- C. cylindrata Liu, Yan, Griswold & Ubick, 2007 — China
- C. cylindriformis Dankittipakul & Singtripop, 2014 — Malaysia (Borneo)
- C. dactylina Liu, Peng & Yan, 2016 — China
- C. dakong Zhang & Yu, 2020 — China
- C. damirkovaci Deeleman-Reinhold, 2001 — Malaysia
- C. debilis Nicolet, 1849 — Chile
- C. deletrix O. Pickard-Cambridge, 1885 — India, China, Taiwan, Japan
- C. delicata Forster, 1979 — New Zealand
- C. dengpao Yu & Li, 2021 — China
- C. denticulata Dhali, Roy, Saha & Raychaudhuri, 2016 — India
- C. desecheonis Petrunkevitch, 1930 — Puerto Rico
- C. deterrima Strand, 1904 — Norway
- C. dichotoma Wang, Chen & Z. S. Zhang, 2018 — China
- C. didentata Zhang & Yin, 1998 — China
- C. digitata Dankittipakul, 2012 — Thailand
- C. dikita Barrion & Litsinger, 1995 — Philippines
- C. diversa O. Pickard-Cambridge, 1862 — Europe, Caucasus, Russia (Europe to Far East), Kazakhstan, Pakistan, Korea, Japan
- C. dorni Sarkar, Quasin & Siliwal, 2023 — India (Himalayas)
- C. drassodes O. Pickard-Cambridge, 1874 — India, Bangladesh, China
- C. dubia O. Pickard-Cambridge, 1870 — St. Helena
- C. dunini Mikhailov, 2003 — Russia (Far East)
- C. duoconcava Zhang & Hu, 1991 — China
- C. durbana Roewer, 1951 — South Africa
- C. dyasia Gertsch, 1941 — USA
- C. dysderiformis (Guérin, 1838) — New Guinea
- C. elaphines Urquhart, 1893 — Australia (Tasmania)
- C. ericius Chrysanthus, 1967 — New Guinea
- C. eskovi Mikhailov, 1995 — Russia (Far East)
- C. estes Edwards, 1958 — USA
- C. esuriens Thorell, 1897 — Myanmar
- C. evoronensis Mikhailov, 1995 — Russia (Far East)
- C. excavata (Rainbow, 1920) — Australia (Lord Howe Is.)
- C. excisa O. Pickard-Cambridge, 1898 — Mexico
- C. ezoensis Hayashi, 1987 — Russia (Far East), Japan
- C. falcata Tang, Song & Zhu, 2005 — China, Mongolia
- C. falciforma Liu, Peng & Yan, 2016 — China
- C. fanjingshan Wang, Chen & Z. S. Zhang, 2018 — China
- C. femorocalcarata Huang & Chen, 2012 — Taiwan
- C. filicata O. Pickard-Cambridge, 1874 — Pakistan, India, Bangladesh, Myanmar, Thailand, Laos, China
- C. filifera Dankittipakul, 2008 — Thailand
- C. filoramula Zhang & Yin, 1998 — China
- C. flammaformis L. F. Li, Liu, B. Li & Peng, 2023 — China
- C. flavocincta Nicolet, 1849 — Chile
- C. forcipa Yang, Song & Zhu, 2003 — China
- C. frisia Wunderlich & Schuett, 1995 — Europe to Central Asia
- C. frutetorum L. Koch, 1867 — Europe to Central Asia
- C. furcata Emerton, 1919 — North America, Russia (Middle to East Siberia)
- C. fusoidea Zhang, 1992 — China
- C. fuzhouensis Gong, 1985 — China
- C. gallagheri Barrion & Litsinger, 1995 — Indonesia (Java)
- C. germanica Thorell, 1871 — Europe, Caucasus, Russia (Europe to Far East), Central Asia
- C. gertschi Edwards, 1958 — USA
- C. gilva O. Pickard-Cambridge, 1872 — Israel
- C. giulianetti Rainbow, 1898 — New Guinea
- C. glatiosa Saito, 1934 — Japan
- C. globosa Wang, Chen & Z. S. Zhang, 2018 — China
- C. godfreyi Lessert, 1921 — East Africa
- C. golovatchi Mikhailov, 1990 — Russia (Europe), Caucasus
- C. gongi Zhang, Yin, Bao & Kim, 1997 — China
- C. gongshan He, Liu & Zhang, 2016 — China
- C. grucollaris Yu, Zhang & Chen, 2017 — China
- C. guianensis Caporiacco, 1947 — Guyana
- C. haeinsensis Paik, 1990 — Russia (Far East), China, Korea, Japan
- C. haplotarsa Simon, 1909 — São Tomé and Príncipe
- C. hatamensis (Thorell, 1881) — New Guinea
- C. haupti Tang, Song & Zhu, 2005 — China
- C. hedini Schenkel, 1936 — China
- C. helenae Mikhailov, 2003 — Russia (Far East)
- C. helva Simon, 1897 — South Africa
- C. heteroducta Zhang & Yin, 1998 — China
- C. heterosaca Yin, Yan, Gong & Kim, 1996 — China
- C. hexadentata Dhali, Roy, Saha & Raychaudhuri, 2016 — India
- C. hilaris Simon, 1878 — Mountains of Spain, France, Italy, Austria, Switzerland, North Macedonia and Romania
- C. hindu Deeleman-Reinhold, 2001 — Indonesia (Bali)
- C. hitchinsi Saaristo, 2002 — Seychelles, French Polynesia (Tuamotu)
- C. hoffmanni Schenkel, 1937 — Madagascar
- C. hooda Dong & Zhang, 2016 — China
- C. huaban Xin, Zhang, Li, Zheng & Yu, 2020 — China
- C. hugispaa Barrion & Litsinger, 1995 — Philippines
- C. hugisva Barrion & Litsinger, 1995 — Philippines
- C. huiming Wang, F. Zhang & Z. S. Zhang, 2018 — China
- C. hummeli Schenkel, 1936 — China
- C. hundeshageni Strand, 1907 — Indonesia (Moluccas)
- C. huttoni Forster, 1979 — New Zealand
- C. hwanghakensis Paik, 1990 — Korea
- C. hyrcanica Mikhailov, 1990 — Azerbaijan, Iran
- C. hysgina Simon, 1889 — India
- C. hystrix Berland, 1938 — Indonesia (Lesser Sunda Is.), Vanuatu
- C. iharai Ono, 1995 — Japan
- C. ikedai Ono, 1992 — Japan
- C. inaensis Hayashi, 1989 — Japan
- C. inquilina Deeleman-Reinhold, 2001 — Malaysia (Borneo)
- C. insulana Ono, 1989 — Taiwan, Japan (Ryukyu Is.)
- C. interjecta L. Koch, 1879 — Russia (West Siberia to Far East), Mongolia, China
- C. irinae Mikhailov, 1991 — Russia (Far East), China, Korea
- C. jaegeri Ono, 2011 — Palau Is.
- C. janae Edwards, 1958 — USA
- C. japonica L. Koch, 1878 — Russia (Sakhalin, Kurile Is.), China, Korea, Taiwan, Japan
- C. japonicola Bösenberg & Strand, 1906 — Russia (Far East) to Philippines, Indonesia
- C. jiandan Yu & Li, 2019 — China
- C. jiugong Yu & Zhong, 2021 — China
- C. jiulongensis Zhang, Yin & Kim, 1996 — China
- C. johnsoni Gertsch, 1941 — USA, Canada
- C. jucunda (Karsch, 1879) — Russia (Far East), China, Korea, Taiwan, Japan
- C. juvenis Simon, 1878 — Europe, Iran, Uzbekistan
- C. kagani Gertsch, 1941 — USA
- C. kai Jäger & Dankittipakul, 2010 — China, Laos
- C. kaltenbachi Kritscher, 1966 — New Caledonia
- C. kapataganensis Barrion & Litsinger, 1995 — Philippines
- C. kasanensis Paik, 1990 — Korea, Japan
- C. kastoni Gertsch, 1941 — USA, Canada
- C. kasurensis Mukhtar & Mushtaq, 2005 — Pakistan
- C. katioryza Barrion & Litsinger, 1995 — Philippines
- C. kayashimai Ono, 1994 — Taiwan
- C. kiboschensis Lessert, 1921 — East Africa
- C. kigabensis Strand, 1915 — East Africa
- C. kimyongkii Paik, 1990 — Russia (Far East), China, Korea
- C. kiowa Gertsch, 1941 — North America
- C. komissarovi Mikhailov, 1992 — Russia (Far East), Korea
- C. kowong Chrysanthus, 1967 — New Guinea
- C. krisisensis Barrion & Litsinger, 1995 — Philippines, Indonesia (Borneo)
- C. kropfi Zhang, Zhu & Song, 2003 — China
- C. kuanshanensis Ono, 1994 — Taiwan
- C. kularensis Marusik & Koponen, 2002 — Russia (north-eastern Siberia, Far East)
- C. kulczynskii Lessert, 1905 — North America, Europe, Kazakhstan, Russia (Europe to Far East), Japan
- C. kumadaorum Ono, 1992 — Japan
- C. kunashirensis Mikhailov, 1990 — Russia (Sakhalin, Kurile Is.), Japan
- C. kurenshikovi Mikhailov, 1995 — Russia (Far East)
- C. kurilensis Bösenberg & Strand, 1906 — Russia (Far East), China, Taiwan, Korea, Japan
- C. kurosawai Ono, 1986 — Taiwan, Korea, Japan
- C. kuu Jäger & Dankittipakul, 2010 — Laos
- C. lala Jäger & Dankittipakul, 2010 — Laos
- C. lamellaris Zhang, Yu & Zhong, 2018 — China
- C. lamina Zhang, Zhu & Song, 2007 — China
- C. langei Mikhailov, 1991 — Russia (Far East)
- C. latericia Kulczyński, 1926 — Russia (Middle Siberia to Far East), USA (Alaska)
- C. laticeps O. Pickard-Cambridge, 1885 — China (Yarkand)
- C. latitans Pavesi, 1883 — Ethiopia, Somalia, Kenya
- C. laudabilis Simon, 1909 — Australia (Western Australia)
- C. lawrencei Roewer, 1951 — South Africa
- C. lena Bösenberg & Strand, 1906 — China, Korea, Japan
- C. leonilae Barrion & Litsinger, 1995 — Philippines
- C. leptosa Zhang, Yin, Bao & Kim, 1997 — China
- C. limpida Simon, 1897 — South Africa
- C. linea Xie, Yin, Yan & Kim, 1996 — China
- C. linzhiensis Hu, 2001 — China
- C. lirata Yang, Song & Zhu, 2003 — China
- C. littoralis Banks, 1895 — USA, Canada
- C. logunovi Mikhailov, 1990 — Russia (Far East)
- C. longipes Nicolet, 1849 — Chile
- C. luapalana Giltay, 1935 — Congo
- C. lucida He, Liu & Zhang, 2016 — China
- C. ludhianaensis Tikader, 1976 — India, Bangladesh
- C. lutescens Westring, 1851 — Europe, Turkey, Caucasus, Russia (Europe to Far East), Iran, Kazakhstan, Korea, Japan. Introduced to North America
- C. lyriformis Song & Zhu, 1991 — China
- C. maculata Roewer, 1951 — Australia (Queensland)
- C. mahensis Simon, 1893 — Seychelles
- C. maipai Jäger & Dankittipakul, 2010 — Thailand
- C. mandschurica Schenkel, 1953 — Russia (Far East), China, Korea, Japan
- C. manshanensis Zhu & An, 1988 — China
- C. maracandica Kroneberg, 1875 — Uzbekistan
- C. maritima L. Koch, 1867 — USA, Canada, Caribbean
- C. marmorata L. Koch, 1866 — France to Ukraine and Turkey
- C. marna Roddy, 1966 — USA
- C. marusiki Mikhailov, 1990 — Russia (Far East)
- C. maya Hayashi & Yoshida, 1991 — Japan
- C. maysangarta Barrion & Litsinger, 1995 — Philippines
- C. mayumiae Ono, 1993 — Russia (Far East), Korea, Japan
- C. mazandaranica Mikhailov, 2003 — Azerbaijan, Iran
- C. medog Zhang, Zhu & Song, 2007 — China
- C. melanosticta Thorell, 1890 — Thailand, Indonesia (Sumatra, Krakatau), New Guinea
- C. menglun Yu & Li, 2021 — China
- C. meraukensis Chrysanthus, 1967 — Malaysia, New Guinea
- C. microsapporensis Mikhailov, 1990 — Russia (Far East), Korea
- C. mii Yu & Li, 2021 — China
- C. mikhailovi Deeleman-Reinhold, 2001 — Indonesia (Java)
- C. milingae Barrion-Dupo, Barrion & Heong, 2013 — China (Hainan)
- C. mimula Chamberlin, 1928 — USA, Canada
- C. minima (Ono, 2010) — Japan
- C. minuscula Nicolet, 1849 — Chile
- C. minuta Nicolet, 1849 — Chile
- C. mixta Emerton, 1890 — USA, Canada
- C. modesta L. Koch, 1873 — Australia (Queensland)
- C. moesta Banks, 1896 — USA, Canada, China
- C. moralis Song & Zhu, 1991 — China, Taiwan
- C. mordica O. Pickard-Cambridge, 1898 — Mexico
- C. mujibari Biswas & Raychaudhuri, 1996 — Bangladesh
- C. multidentata Liu, Peng & Yan, 2016 — China
- C. munda Thorell, 1887 — Myanmar
- C. munis Simon, 1909 — Australia (Western Australia)
- C. mutata Gertsch, 1941 — USA, Canada
- C. mutilata Bösenberg & Strand, 1906 — Japan
- C. mykolai Mikhailov, 2003 — Ukraine
- C. nataliae Trilikauskas, 2007 — Russia (Far East)
- C. natalica Simon, 1897 — South Africa
- C. neglecta O. Pickard-Cambridge, 1862 — Europe, Turkey, Caucasus, Russia (Europe to South Siberia), Iran, Central Asia, China, Korea
- C. neglectoides Bösenberg & Strand, 1906 — China, Korea, Japan
- C. nemorum Ledoux, 2004 — Réunion
- C. nenilini Mikhailov, 1995 — Russia (South Siberia)
- C. neocaledonica Berland, 1924 — New Caledonia
- C. newnani Ivie & Barrows, 1935 — USA
- C. nicholsi Gertsch, 1941 — USA
- C. nicobarensis Tikader, 1977 — India (Nicobar Is.)
- C. nigromaculosa Blackwall, 1877 — Seychelles, Réunion
- C. nilgherina Simon, 1906 — India
- C. ningpoensis Schenkel, 1944 — China
- C. nollothensis Simon, 1910 — South Africa
- C. norvegica Strand, 1900 — North America, Europe, Russia (Europe to West Siberia)
- C. notabilis L. Koch, 1873 — Australia (Queensland)
- C. obesa Hentz, 1847 — USA, Canada
- C. oceanica Ono, 2011 — Japan
- C. octoginta Dankittipakul, 2008 — Thailand
- C. odelli Edwards, 1958 — USA
- C. odesanensis Paik, 1990 — Russia (Far East), China, Korea
- C. ogatai Ono, 1995 — Japan
- C. oligerae Mikhailov, 1995 — Russia (Far East)
- C. opeongo Edwards, 1958 — Canada
- C. orientalis Mikhailov, 1995 — North Korea
- C. oteroana Gertsch, 1941 — USA
- C. ovalis Zhang, 1991 — China
- C. pacifica Banks, 1896 — USA, Canada
- C. paenuliformis (Strand, 1916) — Ghana
- C. pahilistapyasea Barrion & Litsinger, 1995 — Thailand, Indonesia (Borneo), Philippines
- C. paiki Mikhailov, 1991 — Russia (Far East)
- C. pala Deeleman-Reinhold, 2001 — Indonesia (Moluccas)
- C. pallidula (Clerck, 1757) (type) — Europe, Caucasus, Russia (Europe to Far East), Central Asia. Introduced to North America
- C. pandalira Barrion-Dupo, Barrion & Heong, 2013 — China
- C. pantherina Chrysanthus, 1967 — New Guinea
- C. papillata Schenkel, 1936 — Russia (Far East), China, Korea
- C. papuana Chrysanthus, 1967 — New Guinea
- C. paralena Mikhailov, 1995 — North Korea
- C. parallela Hu & Li, 1987 — China
- C. paranghinlalakirta Barrion & Litsinger, 1995 — Philippines
- C. parangunikarta Barrion & Litsinger, 1995 — Philippines
- C. parconcinna Deeleman-Reinhold, 2001 — Thailand, Indonesia (Borneo)
- C. parva Seo, 2018 — Korea
- C. parvula Saito, 1933 — Japan
- C. peculiaris L. Koch, 1873 — New Zealand
- C. phansa Strand, 1911 — Indonesia (Aru Is.)
- C. phragmitis C. L. Koch, 1843 — Morocco, Algeria, Europe, Caucasus, Russia (Europe to Far East), Iran, Central Asia, China, Korea
- C. phragmitoides Schenkel, 1963 — China
- C. pianmaensis Wang, Wu & Zhang, 2015 — China
- C. picturata Deeleman-Reinhold, 2001 — Indonesia (Bali)
- C. pikei Gertsch, 1941 — USA, Canada
- C. pila Dhali, Roy, Saha & Raychaudhuri, 2016 — India
- C. plumbi Gertsch, 1941 — USA
- C. pogonias Simon, 1906 — India
- C. pollicaris Wu, Zheng & Zhang, 2015 — China
- C. pomoa Gertsch, 1941 — USA
- C. pongolensis Lawrence, 1952 — South Africa
- C. pototanensis Barrion & Litsinger, 1995 — Philippines
- C. praematura Emerton, 1909 — North America, Russia (Far East)
- C. procera Chrysanthus, 1967 — New Guinea
- C. procteri Gertsch, 1941 — USA
- C. producta Forster, 1979 — New Zealand
- C. propinqua L. Koch, 1879 — Russia (Middle Siberia to Far East), North Korea, China
- C. proszynskii Mikhailov, 1995 — North Korea
- C. pruvotae Berland, 1930 — New Caledonia
- C. pseudocordata Dhali, Roy, Saha & Raychaudhuri, 2016 — India
- C. pseudogermanica Schenkel, 1936 — Russia (Far East), China, Korea, Japan
- C. pseudomaxillata Hogg, 1915 — New Guinea
- C. pseudoneglecta Wunderlich, 1994 — Morocco, Algeria, Europe, Caucasus, Iran
- C. pseudopteroneta Raven & Stumkat, 2002 — Australia (Queensland)
- C. pseudosaxatilis Mikhailov, 1992 — Russia (Central Asia, South Siberia), Kazakhstan
- C. pseudosimilis Mikhailov, 1990 — Algeria, Portugal, Greece (Crete), Caucasus
- C. pterogona Yang, Song & Zhu, 2003 — China
- C. puera Nicolet, 1849 — Chile
- C. pupillaris Lawrence, 1938 — South Africa
- C. pupula Thorell, 1897 — Myanmar
- C. pygmaea Banks, 1892 — USA, Canada
- C. pyrifera Schenkel, 1936 — China
- C. qianlei J. S. Zhang, F. Zhang & Yu, 2022 — China
- C. qini Tang, Song & Zhu, 2005 — China
- C. qiyunensis Xu, Yang & Song, 2003 — China
- C. quebecana Dondale & Redner, 1976 — USA, Canada
- C. rainbowi Roewer, 1951 — Australia (Lord Howe Is.)
- C. rama Dankittipakul & Singtripop, 2008 — India, Thailand, China
- C. ramoiensis (Thorell, 1881) — New Guinea
- C. rava Simon, 1886 — Senegal
- C. reclusa O. Pickard-Cambridge, 1863 — Europe, Turkey, Russia (Europe to South Siberia), Kazakhstan
- C. revillioidi Lessert, 1936 — South Africa, Mozambique
- C. rhododendri Barrows, 1945 — USA
- C. rileyi Gertsch, 1941 — USA
- C. riparia L. Koch, 1866 — Russia (Urals to Far East), Mongolia, China, Japan, North America
- C. risbeci Berland, 1930 — New Caledonia
- C. rivalis Pavesi, 1883 — Ethiopia
- C. robusta L. Koch, 1873 — Australia
- C. roeweri Caporiacco, 1940 — Ethiopia
- C. rosserae Locket, 1953 — Britain, France, Netherlands, Poland, Slovakia, Hungary, Romania
- C. rostrata Paik, 1985 — Russia (Far East), China, Korea, Japan
- C. rothschildi Berland, 1922 — Ethiopia
- C. rumpiana Lawrence, 1952 — South Africa
- C. rybini Mikhailov, 1992 — Kazakhstan, Kyrgyzstan
- C. ryukyuensis Ono, 1989 — Japan (Ryukyu Is.)
- C. saltitans Emerton, 1919 — USA, Canada
- C. saltuum Kulczyński, 1898 — Austria
- C. samoensis Berland, 1929 — Samoa, French Polynesia (Society Is., Austral Is.: Rapa)
- C. sapporensis Hayashi, 1986 — Russia (Far East), Korea, Japan
- C. saurica Mikhailov, 1992 — Kazakhstan
- C. savesi Berland, 1930 — New Caledonia
- C. saxatilis L. Koch, 1867 — France to Poland and south-eastern Europe
- C. scandens Deeleman-Reinhold, 2001 — Malaysia (Borneo)
- C. scatula Forster, 1979 — New Zealand
- C. scenica Nicolet, 1849 — Chile
- C. semicircularis Tang, Song & Zhu, 2005 — China
- C. sertungensis Hayashi, 1996 — Indonesia (Krakatau)
- C. shillongensis Majumder & Tikader, 1991 — India
- C. shuangsi Yu & Li, 2021 — China
- C. sichotanica Mikhailov, 2003 — Russia (Far East)
- C. sigillata Lawrence, 1952 — South Africa
- C. silvestris Deeleman-Reinhold, 2001 — Malaysia (Borneo)
- C. similis L. Koch, 1867 — Europe, Turkey, Caucasus
- C. sjostedti Lessert, 1921 — East Africa
  - C. s. spinigera Lessert, 1921 — East Africa
- C. sopaikensis Paik, 1990 — Russia (Far East), Korea
- C. sparassella Strand, 1909 — South Africa
- C. spiralis Emerton, 1909 — USA, Canada
- C. stagnatilis Kulczyński, 1897 — Europe, Caucasus, Russia (Europe to South Siberia), Central Asia
- C. stiligera Deeleman-Reinhold, 2001 — Indonesia (Sumatra)
- C. straminea O. Pickard-Cambridge, 1872 — Israel
- C. subapplanata Wang, Chen & Z. S. Zhang, 2018 — China
- C. subasrevida Yu & Li, 2019 — China
- C. subborealis Mikhailov, 1992 — Russia (South Siberia, Far East), Mongolia
- C. subcylindrica Wang, Chen & Z. S. Zhang, 2018 — China
- C. subdidentata Yu & Li, 2021 — China
- C. subkuu Yu & Li, 2019 — China
- C. submaculata (Thorell, 1891) — India (Nicobar Is.)
- C. submoralis Wu, Zheng & Zhang, 2015 — China
- C. subnotabilis Strand, 1907 — Australia
- C. subparallela Zhang, Zhu & Song, 2007 — China
- C. subquebecana Yu & Li, 2019 — China
- C. subrama Yu & Li, 2019 — China
- C. subrostrata Zhang & Hu, 1991 — China
- C. subsultans Thorell, 1875 — Europe, Russia (Europe to South Siberia), Japan
- C. subtilis L. Koch, 1867 — Europe, Russia (Europe to Far East), Kyrgyzstan, Korea
- C. subtongi Yu & Li, 2021 — China
- C. subtrivialis Strand, 1906 — Ethiopia, East Africa
- C. subyaginumai Yu & Li, 2019 — China
- C. subyangmingensis Gan & Wang, 2020 — China
- C. suthepica Dankittipakul, 2008 — Thailand
- C. tabupumensis Petrunkevitch, 1914 — Myanmar
- C. taiwanica Ono, 1994 — China, Taiwan
- C. tangi Liu, Peng & Yan, 2016 — China
- C. tanikawai Ono, 1989 — China, Taiwan, Japan (Ryukyu Is.)
- C. tateyamensis Hayashi, 1989 — Japan
- C. tenera (Thorell, 1890) — Indonesia (Sumatra, Java)
- C. tengchong Zhang, Zhu & Song, 2007 — China
- C. ternatensis (Thorell, 1881) — Indonesia (Moluccas)
- C. terrestris Westring, 1851 — Europe (without Russia), Turkey
- C. theoblicki Yu & Li, 2019 — China
- C. thorelli Roewer, 1951 — Indonesia (Sumatra)
- C. tiane Yu & Li, 2019 — China
- C. tianpingshan L. F. Li, Liu, B. Li & Peng, 2023 — China
- C. tiantongensis Zhang, Yin & Kim, 1996 — China
- C. tikaderi Majumder & Tikader, 1991 — India
- C. tixing Yu & Li, 2021 — China
- C. tongdaoensis Zhang, Yin, Bao & Kim, 1997 — China, Korea
- C. tongi Yu & Li, 2019 — China
- C. topakea Barrion & Litsinger, 1995 — Philippines
- C. torta Forster, 1979 — New Zealand
- C. tortuosa Zhang & Yin, 1998 — China
- C. transbaicalica Mikhailov, 1992 — Russia (South Siberia)
- C. tridentata Dhali, Roy, Saha & Raychaudhuri, 2016 — India
- C. trivialis C. L. Koch, 1843 — North America, Europe, Russia (Europe to Far East), China, Japan
- C. tsurusakii Hayashi, 1987 — Russia (Kurile Is.), Japan
- C. uenoi Ono, 1986 — Japan
- C. umbilensis Lessert, 1923 — South Africa
- C. unanoa Barrion & Litsinger, 1995 — Philippines
- C. unikarta Barrion & Litsinger, 1995 — Philippines
- C. uniyali Sarkar, Quasin & Siliwal, 2023 — India (Himalayas)
- C. upoluensis Marples, 1964 — Samoa
- C. vachoni Lawrence, 1952 — South Africa
- C. vacuna L. Koch, 1873 — New Guinea, Australia (Queensland)
- C. valens Simon, 1897 — South Africa
- C. venatoria Rainbow & Pulleine, 1920 — Australia (Lord Howe Is.)
- C. venusae Barrion & Litsinger, 1995 — Philippines
- C. venusta Paik, 1985 — China, Korea
- C. victoriaensis Barrion & Litsinger, 1995 — Philippines
- C. vigil Karsch, 1879 — Russia (Kurile Is.), Korea, Japan, China
- C. vigillella Strand, 1918 — Japan
- C. violaceovittata Schenkel, 1936 — China
- C. wangchengi Yu & Li, 2021 — China
- C. wolongica Zhu & An, 1999 — China
- C. wulingensis Yu & Chen, 2017 — China
- C. xianning Zhong & Yu, 2022 — China
- C. xiaoci Yu & Li, 2021 — China
- C. xiaokong Yu & Li, 2021 — China
- C. yaginumai Hayashi, 1989 — Taiwan, Japan
- C. yangmingensis Hayashi & Yoshida, 1993 — Taiwan
- C. yanzhii Zhang & Yu, 2020 — China
- C. yaoi Yu & Li, 2019 — China
- C. yaroslavi Mikhailov, 2003 — Russia (Far East)
- C. yasudai Ono, 1991 — Japan
- C. yoshidai Hayashi, 1989 — Japan
- C. yueya Yu & Li, 2019 — China
- C. yurii Mikhailov, 2011 — Mongolia
- C. zacharovi Mikhailov, 1991 — Russia (Far East), Korea
- C. zandstrai Barrion & Litsinger, 1995 — Philippines
- C. zhanggureni Yu & Li, 2019 — China
- C. zhangmuensis Hu & Li, 1987 — China
- C. zhangyongjingi Li & Blick, 2019 — China
- C. zhaoi Yu & Li, 2021 — China
- C. zhengi Yu & Li, 2019 — China
- C. zhigangi Yu & Li, 2021 — China
- C. zhui Xu, Yang & Song, 2003 — China
- C. zilla Dönitz & Strand, 1906 — Japan
- C. zimmermanni Marples, 1964 — Samoa
- C. zyuzini Mikhailov, 1995 — Russia (Far East)
- † C. arcana Scudder, 1890
- † C. attenuata Koch and Berendt, 1854
- † C. curvispinosa Petrunkevitch, 1922
- † C. eversa Scudder, 1890
- † C. florissanti Petrunkevitch, 1922
- † C. lanata Koch and Berendt, 1854
- † C. microphthalma Koch and Berendt, 1854
- † C. pubescens Koch and Berendt, 1854
- † C. sericea Koch and Berendt, 1854
- † C. tomentosa Koch and Berendt, 1854

=== Clubionina ===
Clubionina Berland, 1947

- C. pallida Berland, 1947 (type) — St. Paul Is.

== D ==
=== † Desultor ===
† Desultor Petrunkevitch, 1942

- † D. depressus Petrunkevitch, 1942

== E ==
=== Elaver ===
Elaver O. Pickard-Cambridge, 1898

- E. achuca (Roddy, 1966) — USA
- E. albicans (Franganillo, 1930) — Cuba, Jamaica
- E. arawakan Saturnino & Bonaldo, 2015 — Haiti
- E. balboae (Chickering, 1937) — Panama to Brazil, Cuba
- E. barroana (Chickering, 1937) — Panama
- E. beni Saturnino & Bonaldo, 2015 — Peru, Brazil, Bolivia
- E. brevipes (Keyserling, 1891) — Brazil, Argentina
- E. calcarata (Kraus, 1955) — Mexico, El Salvador, Costa Rica
- E. candelaria Saturnino & Bonaldo, 2015 — Mexico
- E. carlota (Bryant, 1940) — Cuba
- E. chisosa (Roddy, 1966) — USA
- E. crinophora (Franganillo, 1934) — Cuba
- E. crocota (O. Pickard-Cambridge, 1896) — Mexico
- E. darwichi Saturnino & Bonaldo, 2015 — Panama, Ecuador
- E. depuncta O. Pickard-Cambridge, 1898 — Mexico
- E. elaver (Bryant, 1940) — Cuba
- E. excepta (L. Koch, 1866) — USA, Canada, Caribbean
- E. grandivulva (Mello-Leitão, 1930) — Brazil, Bolivia
- E. helenae Saturnino & Bonaldo, 2015 — Mexico
- E. hortoni (Chickering, 1937) — Panama
- E. implicata (Gertsch, 1941) — Hispaniola
- E. juana (Bryant, 1940) — Cuba, Bahama Is.
- E. juruti Saturnino & Bonaldo, 2015 — Brazil
- E. kawitpaaia (Barrion & Litsinger, 1995) — Philippines
- E. kohlsi (Gertsch & Jellison, 1939) — USA
- E. linguata (F. O. Pickard-Cambridge, 1900) — Guatemala
- E. lizae Saturnino & Bonaldo, 2015 — Costa Rica
- E. lutescens (Schmidt, 1971) — Panama to Brazil
- E. madera (Roddy, 1966) — USA
- E. mirabilis (O. Pickard-Cambridge, 1896) — Mexico, Belize, Nicaragua
- E. mulaiki (Gertsch, 1935) — USA
- E. multinotata (Chickering, 1937) — Costa Rica, Panama, Colombia, Venezuela, Peru, Brazil
- E. orvillei (Chickering, 1937) — Panama
- E. placida O. Pickard-Cambridge, 1898 — Mexico
- E. portoricensis (Petrunkevitch, 1930) — Puerto Rico, Virgin Is.
- E. quadrata (Kraus, 1955) — El Salvador
- E. richardi (Gertsch, 1941) — Honduras
- E. sericea O. Pickard-Cambridge, 1898 — Mexico
- E. shinguito Saturnino & Bonaldo, 2015 — Colombia, Peru, Brazil
- E. sigillata (Petrunkevitch, 1925) — Panama, Colombia, Peru, Brazil
- E. simplex (O. Pickard-Cambridge, 1896) — Guatemala
- E. tenera (Franganillo, 1935) — Cuba
- E. tenuis (Franganillo, 1935) — Cuba
- E. texana (Gertsch, 1933) — USA, Mexico
- E. tigrina O. Pickard-Cambridge, 1898 (type) — Mexico, Costa Rica
- E. tourinhoae Saturnino & Bonaldo, 2015 — Colombia, Brazil
- E. tricuspis (F. O. Pickard-Cambridge, 1900) — Guatemala, Panama
- E. tristani (Banks, 1909) — Costa Rica
- E. tumivulva (Banks, 1909) — Costa Rica
- E. turongdaliriana (Barrion & Litsinger, 1995) — Philippines
- E. valvula (F. O. Pickard-Cambridge, 1900) — Panama
- E. vieirae Saturnino & Bonaldo, 2015 — Brazil, Peru
- E. wheeleri (Roewer, 1933) — USA, Mexico
- † E. nutua Wunderlich, 1988

=== † Eobumbatrix ===
† Eobumbatrix Petrunkevitch, 1922

- † E. latebrosa Scudder, 1890

=== † Eodoter ===
† Eodoter Petrunkevitch, 1958

- † E. eopala Wunderlich, 2004
- † E. longimammillae Wunderlich, 2012
- † E. magnificus Petrunkevitch, 1958
- † E. scutatus Wunderlich, 2011
- † E. tibialis Wunderlich, 2011

=== † Eostentatrix ===
† Eostentatrix Petrunkevitch, 1922

- † E. cockerelli Petrunkevitch, 1922
- † E. ostentata Scudder, 1890

=== † Eoversatrix ===
† Eoversatrix Petrunkevitch, 1922

- † E. eversa Scudder, 1890

== F ==
=== Femorbiona ===
Femorbiona Yu & Li, 2021

- F. brachyptera (Zhu & Chen, 2012) (type) — China (Hainan)
- F. phami Yu & Li, 2021 — Vietnam
- F. shenzhen Yu & Li, 2021 — China

== I ==
=== Invexillata ===
Invexillata Versteirt, Baert & Jocqué, 2010

- I. caerulea Versteirt, Baert & Jocqué, 2010 — New Guinea
- I. maculata Versteirt, Baert & Jocqué, 2010 (type) — New Guinea
- I. viridiflava Versteirt, Baert & Jocqué, 2010 — New Guinea

== M ==
=== † Machilla ===
† Machilla Petrunkevitch, 1958

- † M. setosa Petrunkevitch, 1958

=== Malamatidia ===
Malamatidia Deeleman-Reinhold, 2001

- M. bohorokensis Deeleman-Reinhold, 2001 (type) — Indonesia (Sumatra, Borneo)
- M. christae Jäger & Dankittipakul, 2010 — Laos
- M. thorelli Deeleman-Reinhold, 2001 — Indonesia (Sulawesi)
- M. vethi Deeleman-Reinhold, 2001 — Malaysia, Indonesia (Borneo)
- M. zu Jäger & Dankittipakul, 2010 — Laos

=== † Massula ===
† Massula Petrunkevitch, 1942

- † M. klebsi Petrunkevitch, 1942

=== Matidia ===
Matidia Thorell, 1878

- M. bipartita Deeleman-Reinhold, 2001 — Indonesia (Moluccas)
- M. calcarata Thorell, 1878 — Indonesia (Ambon)
- M. chlora Chrysanthus, 1967 — New Guinea
- M. flagellifera Simon, 1897 — Sri Lanka
- M. incurvata Reimoser, 1934 — India
- M. mas Deeleman-Reinhold, 2001 — Thailand
- M. missai Versteirt, Baert & Jocqué, 2010 — New Guinea
- M. muju Chrysanthus, 1967 — New Guinea
- M. paranga (Barrion & Litsinger, 1995) — Philippines
- M. simia Deeleman-Reinhold, 2001 — Indonesia (Sulawesi)
- M. simplex Simon, 1897 — Sri Lanka
- M. spatulata Chen & Huang, 2006 — Taiwan
- M. strobbei Versteirt, 2010 — New Guinea
- M. trinotata Thorell, 1890 — Malaysia
- M. virens Thorell, 1878 (type) — Indonesia (Moluccas, Sulawesi)
- M. viridissima Strand, 1911 — Indonesia (Aru Is.)

== N ==
=== Nusatidia ===
Nusatidia Deeleman-Reinhold, 2001

- N. aeria (Simon, 1897) — Borneo
- N. bimaculata (Simon, 1897) — Sri Lanka
- N. borneensis Deeleman-Reinhold, 2001 — Indonesia (Sumatra, Borneo)
- N. camouflata Deeleman-Reinhold, 2001 — Thailand
- N. changao Yu & Li, 2021 — China
- N. javana (Simon, 1897) (type) — Indonesia (Java, Krakatau)
- N. luzonica (Simon, 1897) — Philippines
- N. manipisea (Barrion & Litsinger, 1995) — Philippines
- N. melanobursa Deeleman-Reinhold, 2001 — Indonesia (Sumatra)
- N. mianju Yu & Li, 2021 — China
- N. snazelli Deeleman-Reinhold, 2001 — Indonesia (Java, Sumatra)
- N. subjavana Yu & Li, 2021 — China
- N. vietnamensis Logunov & Jäger, 2015 — Vietnam

== P ==
=== Porrhoclubiona ===
Porrhoclubiona Lohmander, 1944

- P. bosmansi Marusik & Omelko, 2018 — Tajikistan
- P. decora (Blackwall, 1859) — Madeira, Azores
- P. diniensis (Simon, 1878) — Algeria, Morocco, Tunisia, Portugal, Spain, France, Italy
- P. genevensis (L. Koch, 1866) (type) — Europe, Turkey, Caucasus, Russia (Europe to South Siberia), Iran, Central Asia
- P. laudata (O. Pickard-Cambridge, 1885) — China
- P. leucaspis (Simon, 1932) — Europe, Algeria, Morocco, Tunisia
- P. minor (Wunderlich, 1987) — Canary Is.
- P. moradmandi Marusik & Omelko, 2018 — Iran
- P. pseudominor (Wunderlich, 1987) — Canary Is.
- P. pteronetoides (Deeleman-Reinhold, 2001) — Thailand
- P. vegeta (Simon, 1918) — Canary Is., North Africa, Southern Europe, Caucasus, Iran
- P. viridula (Ono, 1989) — China, Taiwan, Thailand, Japan (Ryukyu Is.), Indonesia (Lesser Sunda Is.)
- P. wunderlichi (Mikhailov, 1992) — Mongolia

=== Pristidia ===
Pristidia Deeleman-Reinhold, 2001

- P. cervicornuta Yu, Zhang & Chen, 2017 — China (Hainan)
- P. longistila Deeleman-Reinhold, 2001 — Malaysia (Borneo)
- P. prima Deeleman-Reinhold, 2001 (type) — Thailand, Malaysia (Peninsula), Indonesia (Sumatra, Java)
- P. ramosa Yu, Sun & Zhang, 2012 — China, Taiwan
- P. secunda Deeleman-Reinhold, 2001 — Indonesia (Sumatra)
- P. viridissima Deeleman-Reinhold, 2001 — Thailand, Malaysia, Indonesia (Sumatra, Borneo, Java)

=== † Prosocer ===
† Prosocer Petrunkevitch, 1963

- † P. mollis Petrunkevitch, 1963

=== Pteroneta ===
Pteroneta Deeleman-Reinhold, 2001

- P. baiteta Versteirt, Deeleman-Reinhold & Baert, 2008 — New Guinea
- P. brevichela Versteirt, Deeleman-Reinhold & Baert, 2008 — New Guinea
- P. longichela Versteirt, Deeleman-Reinhold & Baert, 2008 — New Guinea
- P. madangiensis Versteirt, Deeleman-Reinhold & Baert, 2008 — New Guinea
- P. saltans Deeleman-Reinhold, 2001 (type) — Malaysia, Indonesia (Sulawesi, Lesser Sunda Is.), Borneo
- P. spinosa Raven & Stumkat, 2002 — Australia (Queensland)
- P. tertia Deeleman-Reinhold, 2001 — Singapore, Indonesia (Borneo, Sulawesi)
- P. ultramarina (Ono, 1989) — Japan (Ryukyu Is.)

== R ==
=== Ramosatidia ===
Ramosatidia Yu & Li, 2021

- R. situ Yu & Li, 2021 (type) — China

== S ==
=== Scopalio ===
Scopalio Deeleman-Reinhold, 2001

- S. verrens Deeleman-Reinhold, 2001 (type) — Borneo

=== Simalio ===
Simalio Simon, 1897

- S. aurobindoi Patel & Reddy, 1991 — India
- S. biswasi Majumder & Tikader, 1991 — India
- S. castaneiceps Simon, 1906 — India
- S. lucorum Simon, 1906 — Sri Lanka
- S. percomis Simon, 1906 — India
- S. petilus Simon, 1897 (type) — Philippines
- S. phaeocephalus Simon, 1906 — Sri Lanka
- S. rubidus Simon, 1897 — Trinidad

=== Sinostidia ===
Sinostidia Yu & Li, 2021

- S. dujiao Yu & Li, 2021 — China
- S. shuangjiao Yu & Li, 2021 (type) — China

== T ==
=== Tixcocoba ===
Tixcocoba Gertsch, 1977

- T. maya Gertsch, 1977 (type) — Mexico
