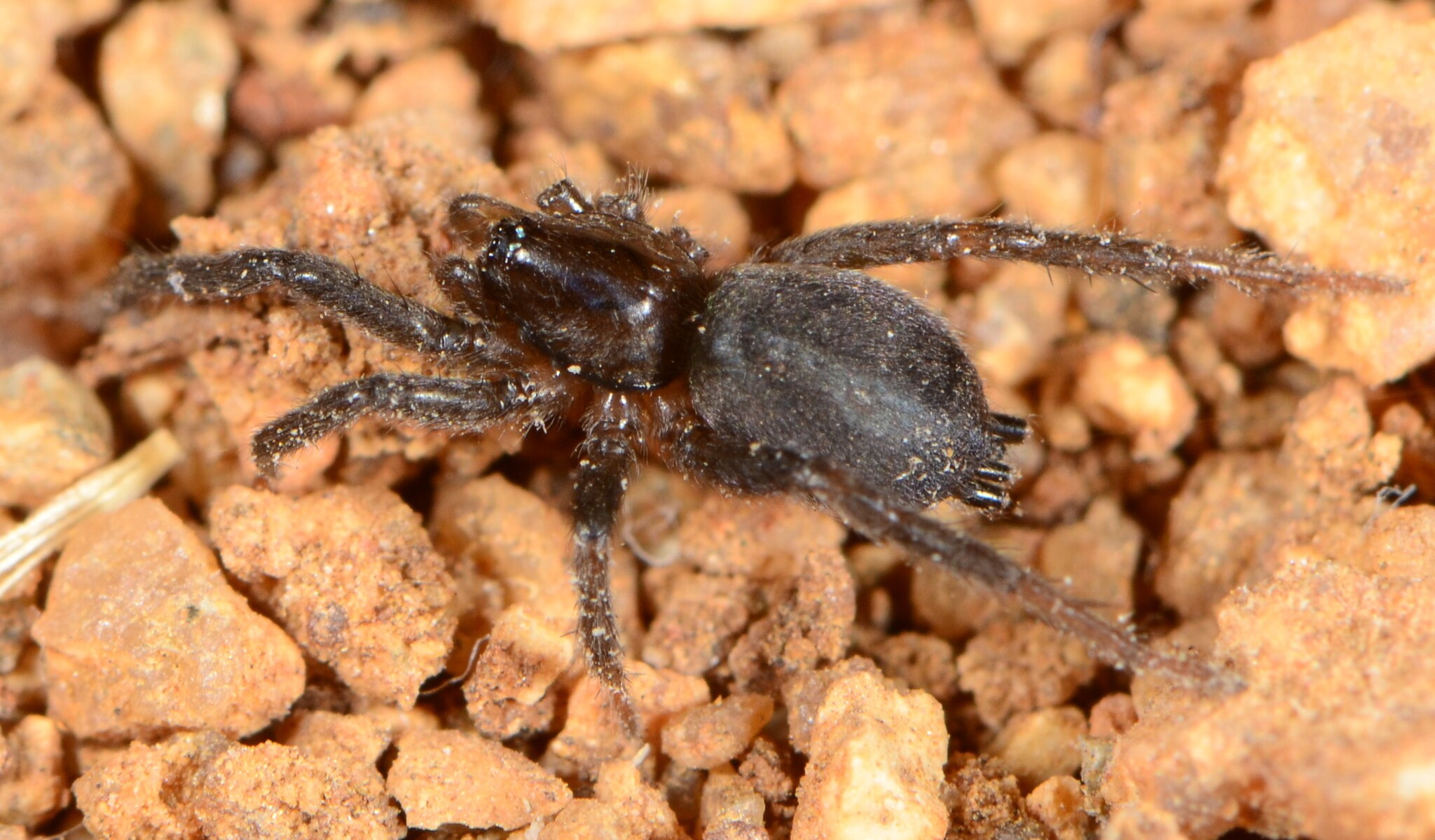
- Female
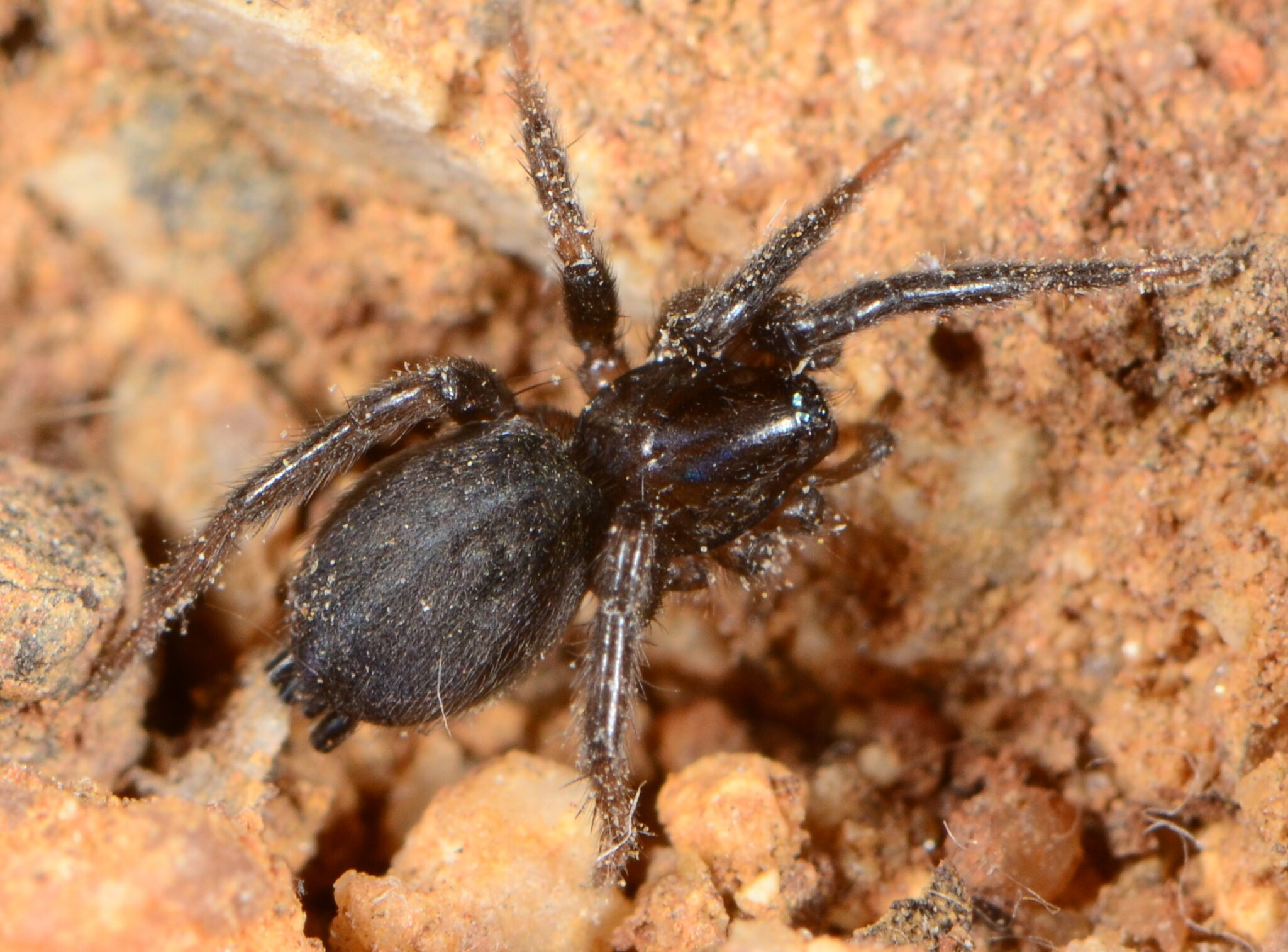
- Female

Scientific classification
- Kingdom: Animalia
- Phylum: Arthropoda
- Subphylum: Chelicerata
- Class: Arachnida
- Order: Araneae
- Infraorder: Araneomorphae
- Family: Gnaphosidae
- Genus: Zelotes
- Species: Z. humilis

Binomial name
- Zelotes humilis (Purcell, 1907)

Synonyms
- Melanophora humilis Purcell, 1907; Zelotes hewitti Tucker, 1923; Zelotes montivaga Tucker, 1923

= Zelotes humilis =

Ceres Dark Ground Spider

Species of spider

Zelotes humilis is a species of spider in the family Gnaphosidae. It is endemic to southern Africa and is commonly known as the Ceres dark ground spider.

== Distribution ==
Zelotes humilis occurs in Zimbabwe and South Africa. In South Africa, it is recorded from seven provinces: Eastern Cape, Free State, Gauteng, KwaZulu-Natal, Limpopo, North West, Northern Cape, and Western Cape. The species occurs at altitudes ranging from 61 to 1,850 m above sea level.

The species has an extensive distribution with numerous collection localities including Grahamstown, Mountain Zebra National Park, Florisbad Research Station, Bloemfontein, Pretoria, Klipriviersberg Nature Reserve, Ngome State Forest, and multiple sites within the Cederberg Wilderness Area, Bontebok National Park, and Stellenbosch.

== Description ==
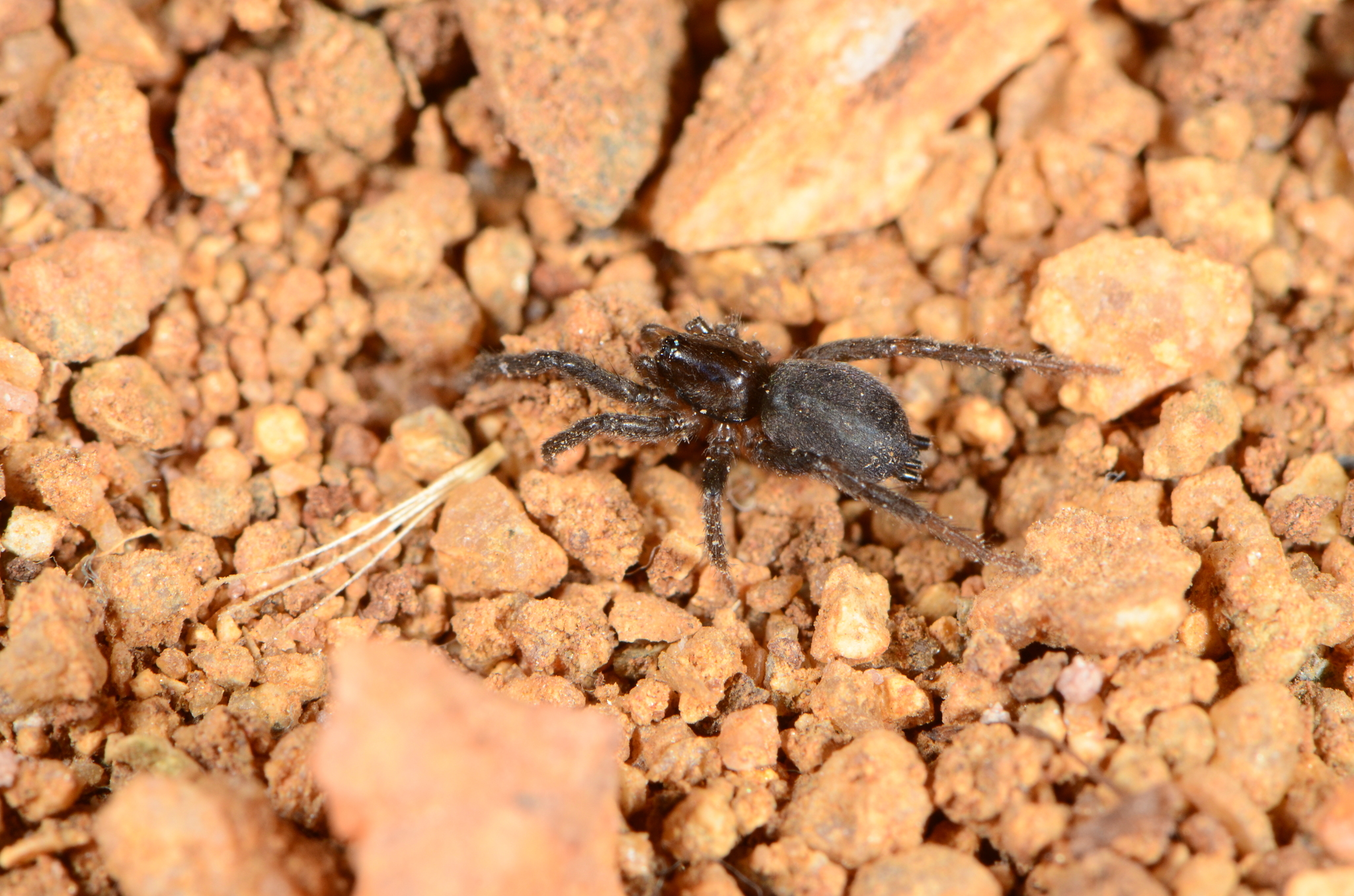
female

== Habitat and ecology ==
Zelotes humilis are free-running spiders found under stones during the day. The species has been sampled from the Fynbos, Grassland, and Savanna biomes.

== Conservation ==
Zelotes humilis is listed as Least Concern by the South African National Biodiversity Institute due to its wide geographic range. There are no significant threats to the species, and it is protected in more than ten protected areas.

== Taxonomy ==
The species was originally described by William Frederick Purcell in 1907 from Ceres in the Western Cape as Melanophora humilis. FitzPatrick's 2007 revision recognized Zelotes montivagus Tucker, 1923 as a junior synonym of Zelotes humilis. The species is known from both sexes.
