= Clubiona hwanghakensis =

Scientific classification
- Kingdom: Animalia
- Phylum: Arthropoda
- Subphylum: Chelicerata
- Class: Arachnida
- Order: Araneae
- Infraorder: Araneomorphae
- Family: Clubionidae
- Genus: Clubiona
- Species: C. hwanghakensis

Binomial name
- Clubiona hwanghakensis Paik, 1990

Species of spider

Clubiona hwanghakensis is a species of Clubionidae spider endemic to Korea.

== Taxonomy ==
This species was first described in 1990 by Paik Kap Yong. It has been found on Hwanghaksan in Gyeongsangbuk-do, whence its specific epithet, which describes the spider as coming from Hwanghaksan.

On hatching, the new-born spiders consume their mother.
