= Clubiona sigillata =

Pietermaritzburg Short Legged Sac Spider

Conservation status
- Least Concern (SANBI Red List)

Scientific classification
- Kingdom: Animalia
- Phylum: Arthropoda
- Subphylum: Chelicerata
- Class: Arachnida
- Order: Araneae
- Infraorder: Araneomorphae
- Family: Clubionidae
- Genus: Clubiona
- Species: C. sigillata

Binomial name
- Clubiona sigillata Lawrence, 1952

Species of spider

Clubiona sigillata is a species of spider in the family Clubionidae. It is endemic to South Africa, originally described from Pietermaritzburg.

== Distribution ==
Clubiona sigillata is known from three provinces in South Africa at elevations ranging from 33 to 1706 m. It has been recorded from the Eastern Cape, Gauteng, and KwaZulu-Natal.

== Habitat ==
The species is a free-living plant dweller found in the Forest, Grassland, Nama Karoo, Savanna and Thicket biomes. It inhabits diverse vegetation types across its range.

== Conservation ==
The species is listed as Least Concern. Although threatened by habitat loss due to urbanization and agricultural activities in parts of its range and known only from males, it has a wide geographical range. It is protected in Cwebe Nature Reserve, Mountain Zebra National Park and Klipriviersberg Nature Reserve.
