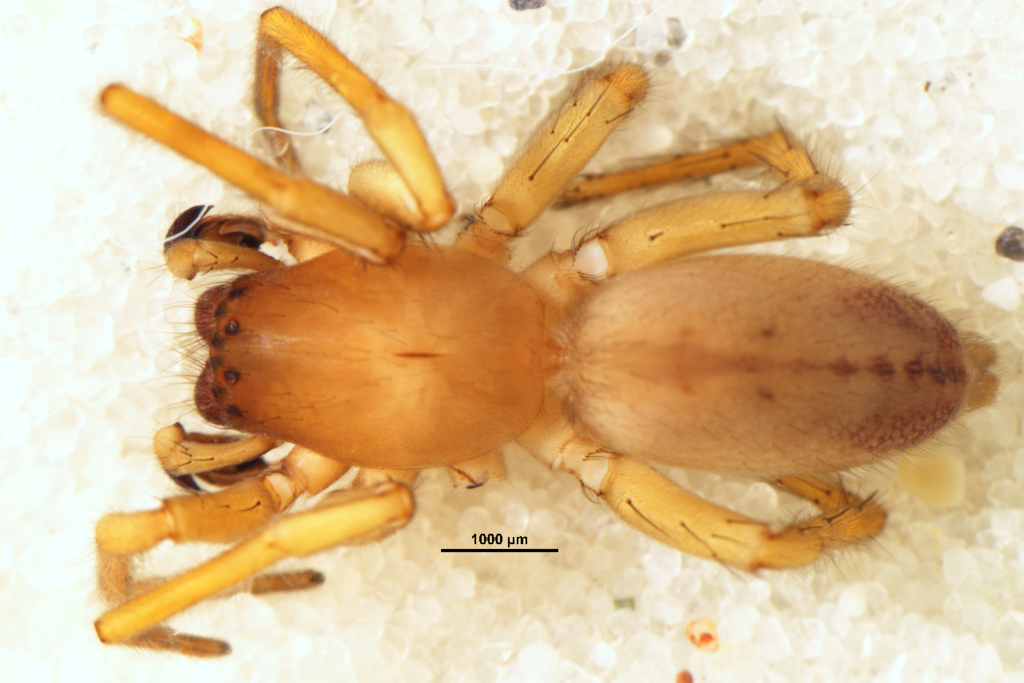

Conservation status
- Not Threatened (NZ TCS)

Scientific classification
- Kingdom: Animalia
- Phylum: Arthropoda
- Subphylum: Chelicerata
- Class: Arachnida
- Order: Araneae
- Infraorder: Araneomorphae
- Family: Clubionidae
- Genus: Clubiona
- Species: C. contrita

Binomial name
- Clubiona contrita Forster, 1979

= Clubiona contrita =

Species of spider

Clubiona contrita is a species of Clubionidae spider endemic to New Zealand.

== Taxonomy ==
This species was described in 1979 by Ray Forster from male and female specimens. The holotype is stored in Otago Museum.

== Description ==
The male is recorded at 6.3 mm (0.25 in) in length whereas the female is 6.9 mm (0.27 in). The carapace is orange brown. The legs are straw brown. The abdomen is cream coloured with a dorsal stripe and chevron pattern markings. It is very similar to Clubiona cambridgei, which has overlapping distributions. They can be distinguished by minor differences in the genitalia.

== Distribution ==
This species is restricted to the South Island of New Zealand, mostly around Otago.

== Conservation status ==
Under the New Zealand Threat Classification System, this species is listed as "Not Threatened".
