= Clubiona marna =

Scientific classification
- Kingdom: Animalia
- Phylum: Arthropoda
- Subphylum: Chelicerata
- Class: Arachnida
- Order: Araneae
- Infraorder: Araneomorphae
- Family: Clubionidae
- Genus: Clubiona
- Species: C. marna

Binomial name
- Clubiona marna (Roddy, 1966)

Species of spider

Clubiona marna is a species of spider in the spider family Clubionidae. It was first circumscribed in 1966.

The species closely resembles Clubiona mimula. The females are about 1/4th of an inch (5.75 mm) in length, and the males are smaller, about 1/5th inch (4.78 mm) in length. Its carapace and appendages are pale yellowish brown, and its abdomen is reddish brown covered with fine hairs.

The female holotype was collected in Cedar Grove, Kings River Canyon, Tulare County, California in July, 1952. Its range includes San Francisco County, Marin County, Nevada County, and Santa Clara County in California.
