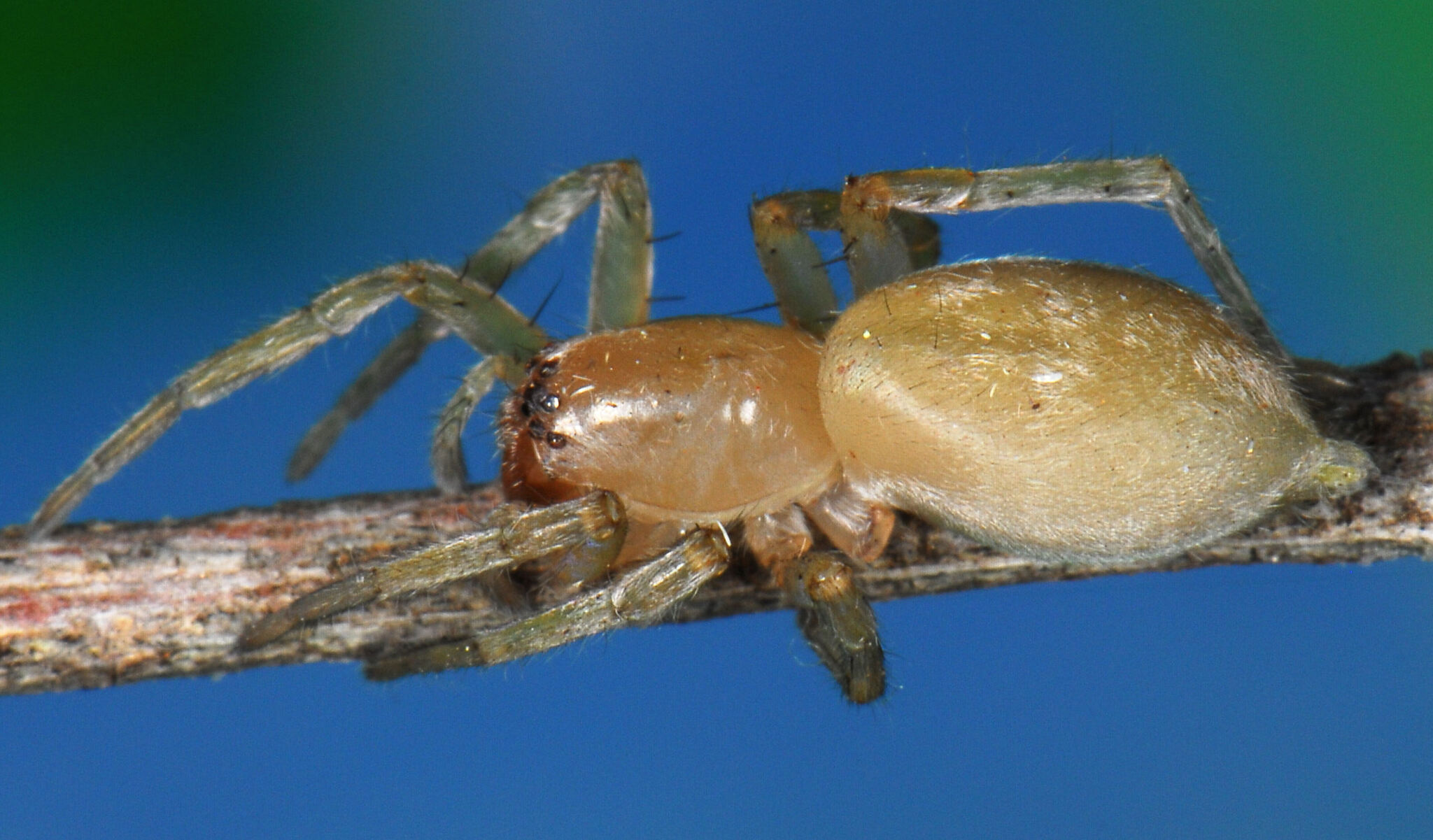
- Female
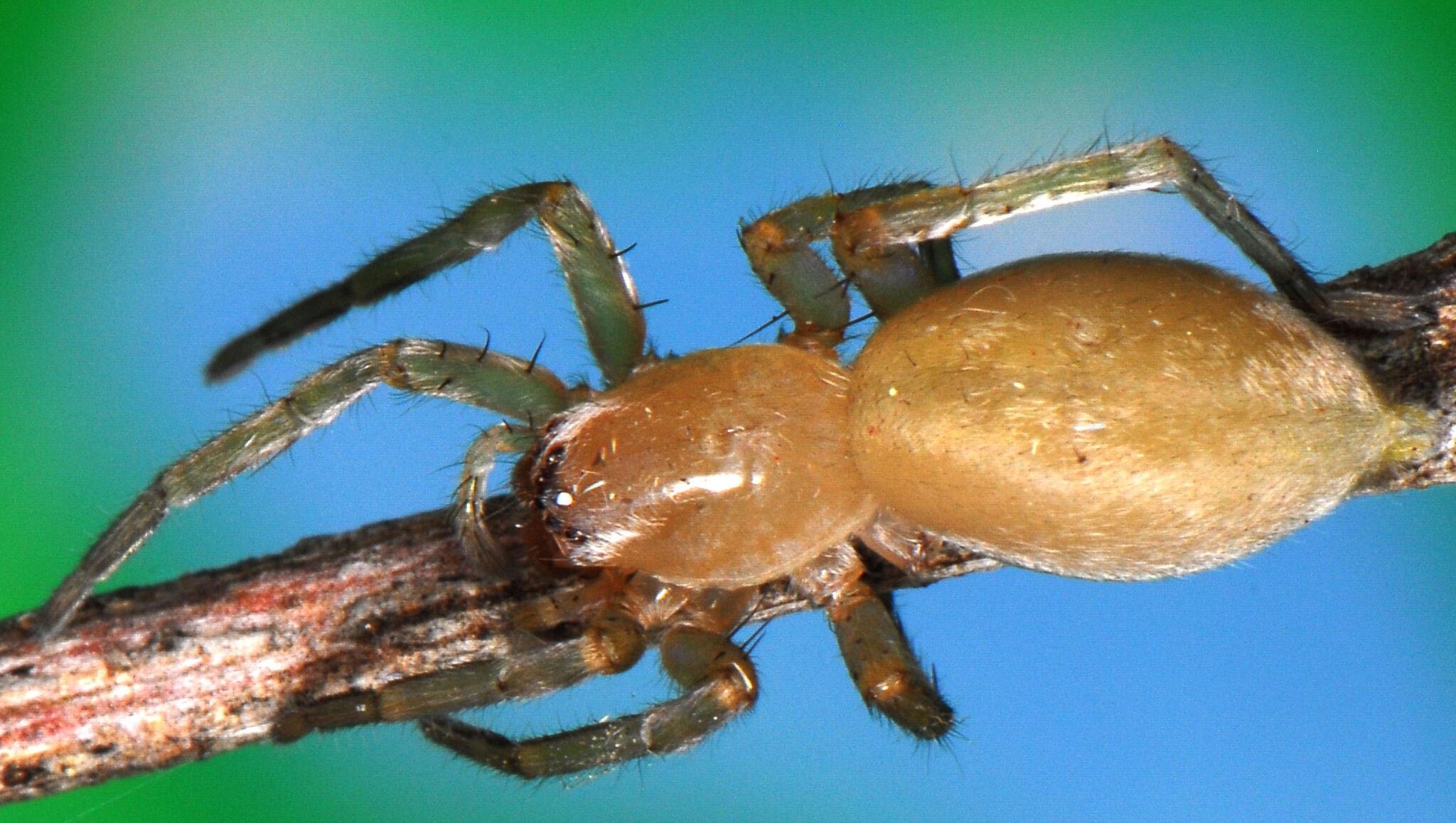
- Female

Scientific classification
- Kingdom: Animalia
- Phylum: Arthropoda
- Subphylum: Chelicerata
- Class: Arachnida
- Order: Araneae
- Infraorder: Araneomorphae
- Family: Clubionidae
- Genus: Clubiona
- Species: C. bevisi

Binomial name
- Clubiona bevisi Lessert, 1923

= Clubiona bevisi =

Bevisi's Short Legged Sac Spider

Species of spider

Bevisi's short-legged sac spider, (Clubiona bevisi) is a species of spider in the family Clubionidae. It is endemic to South Africa.

== Habitat and distribution ==
Bevisi's short-legged sac spider is known from the South African provinces Free State, Gauteng, KwaZulu-Natal, and Limpopo.

The species is a free-living plant dweller found in grassland and savanna biomes at elevations ranging from 140 to 1706 m. It constructs sac-like retreats in vegetation in which it shelters and deposits egg sacs.

== Morphology ==
Bevisi's short-legged sac spider is a yellowish-tan spider with an olive green tint. The chelicerae are reddish-brown. Clubiona bevesi is similar in appearance to its cogener Clubiona sjostedti but is distinguished by thicker pedipalps and a smaller tibial process. The type specimen, a male, was 8mm long.

== Description ==
C. bevisi was originally described in 1923 by the Swiss arachnologist Roger de Lessert from a specimen in the Durban Natural Science Museum collected from Umbilo in the KwaZulu-Natal province of South Africa. It is presumably named after A. Lionel Bevis, an employee of the museum who collected the original specimen.

Both males and females are known to science, though the female remains formally undescribed.

== Conservation ==
The species is listed as Least Concern due to its wide geographical range within South Africa. It is protected in several nature reserves including Amanzi Nature Reserve, Sandveld Nature Reserve, Klipriviersberg Nature Reserve, Ndumo Game Reserve, and Lhuvhondo Nature Reserve.
