= Clubiona bagerhatensis =

Scientific classification
- Kingdom: Animalia
- Phylum: Arthropoda
- Subphylum: Chelicerata
- Class: Arachnida
- Order: Araneae
- Infraorder: Araneomorphae
- Family: Clubionidae
- Genus: Clubiona
- Species: C. bagerhatensis

Binomial name
- Clubiona bagerhatensis Biswas & Raychaudhuri, 1996

Species of spider

Clubiona bagerhatensis is a species of spider in the family Clubionidae. It is named for Bagerhat.

== See also ==
- List of Clubionidae species
