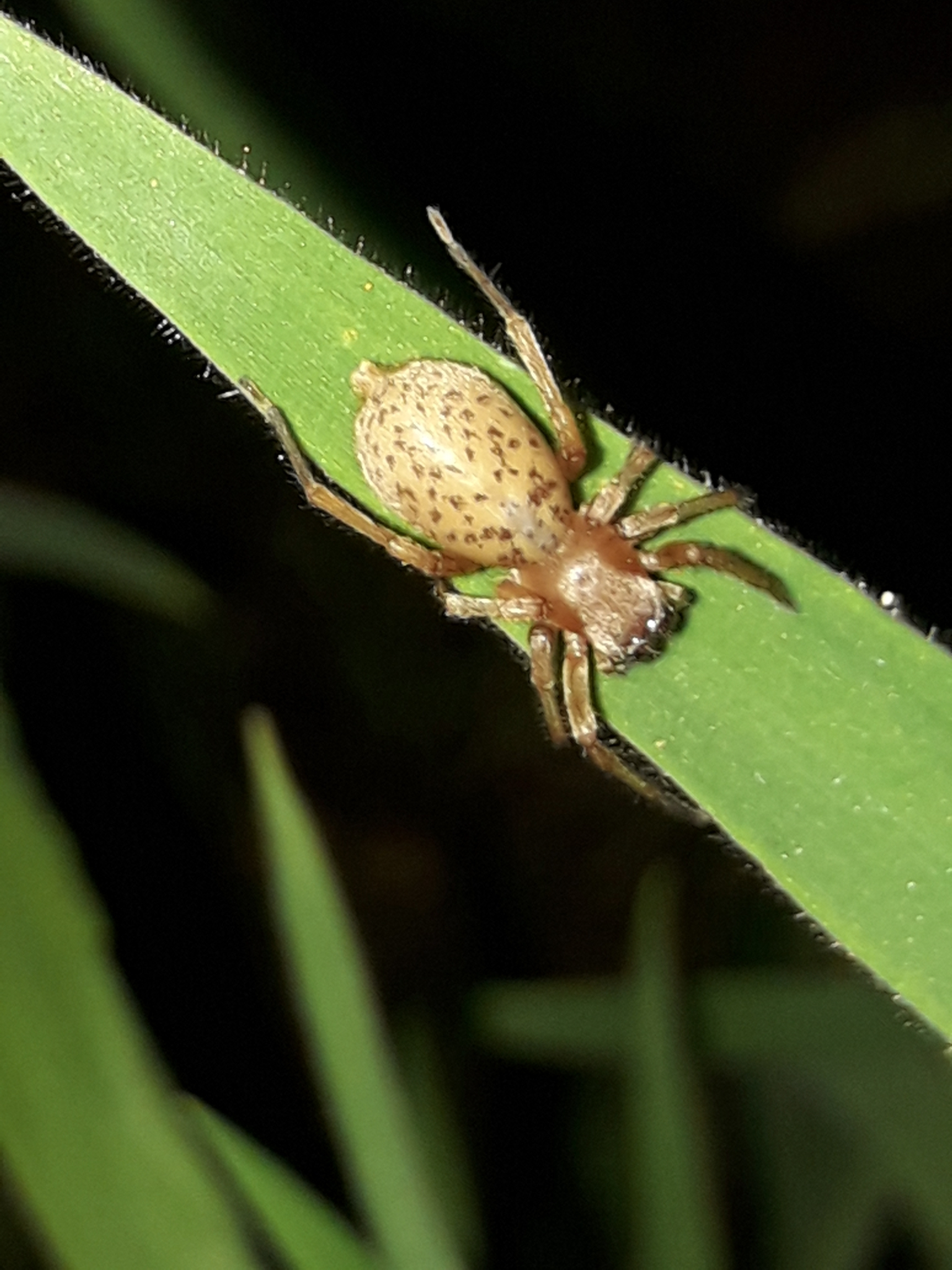

Conservation status
- Not Threatened (NZ TCS)

Scientific classification
- Kingdom: Animalia
- Phylum: Arthropoda
- Subphylum: Chelicerata
- Class: Arachnida
- Order: Araneae
- Infraorder: Araneomorphae
- Family: Clubionidae
- Genus: Clubiona
- Species: C. convoluta

Binomial name
- Clubiona convoluta Forster, 1979

= Clubiona convoluta =

Species of spider

Clubiona convoluta is a species of Clubionidae spider endemic to New Zealand.

== Taxonomy ==
This species was described in 1979 by Ray Forster from male and female specimens. The holotype is stored in Otago Museum.

== Description ==
The male is recorded at 6.8mm in length whereas the female is 7.9mm. The cephalothorax and legs are reddish brown. The abdomen is yellow with dark spots dorsally. This species is similar to Clubiona huttoni, but has a paler abdomen.

== Distribution ==
This species is widespread throughout New Zealand.

== Conservation status ==
Under the New Zealand Threat Classification System, this species is listed as "Not Threatened".
