= Clubiona pongolensis =

Pongola Short-Legged Sac Spider

Conservation status
- Least Concern (SANBI Red List)

Scientific classification
- Kingdom: Animalia
- Phylum: Arthropoda
- Subphylum: Chelicerata
- Class: Arachnida
- Order: Araneae
- Infraorder: Araneomorphae
- Family: Clubionidae
- Genus: Clubiona
- Species: C. pongolensis

Binomial name
- Clubiona pongolensis Lawrence, 1952

Species of spider

Clubiona pongolensis is a species of spider in the family Clubionidae. It is endemic to South Africa, originally described from Pongola.

== Distribution ==
Clubiona pongolensis is known from four provinces in South Africa at elevations ranging from 42 to 1,750 m. It has been recorded from the Eastern Cape, Gauteng, KwaZulu-Natal, and Limpopo.

== Habitat ==
The species is a free-living plant dweller found in the Grassland and Savanna biomes. It constructs sac-like retreats in vegetation for shelter and egg-laying.

== Description ==
Both sexes are known to science.

== Conservation ==
The species is listed as Least Concern due to its wide geographic range and protection in multiple areas. It is protected in five protected areas including Addo Elephant National Park, Klipriviersberg Nature Reserve, Ithala Nature Reserve, Ndumo Game Reserve, and Luvhondo Nature Reserve.
