= Clubiona producta =

Conservation status
- Naturally Uncommon (NZ TCS)

Scientific classification
- Kingdom: Animalia
- Phylum: Arthropoda
- Subphylum: Chelicerata
- Class: Arachnida
- Order: Araneae
- Infraorder: Araneomorphae
- Family: Clubionidae
- Genus: Clubiona
- Species: C. producta

Binomial name
- Clubiona producta Forster, 1979

Species of spider

Clubiona producta is a species of Clubionidae spider endemic to New Zealand.

== Taxonomy ==
This species was described in 1979 by Ray Forster from male and female specimens. The holotype is stored in the New Zealand Arthropod Collection under registration number NZAC03014960.

== Description ==
The male is recorded at 6.6mm in length whereas the female is 6.9mm. The cephalothorax and legs are pale yellowish brown. The abdomen has blackish spots dorsally and a few ventrally. It is most similar to Clubiona huttoni, but can be separated by minor differences in the genitalia and the darkness of the abdomen spots.

== Distribution ==
This species is only known from Three Kings Islands in New Zealand.

== Conservation status ==
Under the New Zealand Threat Classification System, this species is listed as "Naturally Uncommon" with the qualifiers of "Island Endemic" and "Range Restricted".
