= Clubiona umbilensis =

Umbilo Short-Legged Sac Spider

Conservation status
- Least Concern (SANBI Red List)

Scientific classification
- Kingdom: Animalia
- Phylum: Arthropoda
- Subphylum: Chelicerata
- Class: Arachnida
- Order: Araneae
- Infraorder: Araneomorphae
- Family: Clubionidae
- Genus: Clubiona
- Species: C. umbilensis

Binomial name
- Clubiona umbilensis Lessert, 1923

Species of spider

Clubiona umbilensis is a species of spider in the family Clubionidae. It is endemic to South Africa, originally described from Umbilo.

== Distribution ==
Clubiona umbilensis is known from a few localities in two provinces at elevations ranging from 71 to 875 metres. It has been recorded from KwaZulu-Natal and the Western Cape.

== Habitat ==
The species is a free-living plant dweller found in the Fynbos, Indian Ocean Coastal Belt, Forest and Savanna biomes. It inhabits diverse vegetation types across its range.

== Conservation ==
The species is listed as Least Concern. Although known only from males and under-collected with more localities suspected to occur, it has a wide geographical range. It is threatened by habitat loss in parts of its range but is protected in Ngome State Forest and Tembe Elephant Park.
