= Simalio =

Scientific classification
- Kingdom: Animalia
- Phylum: Arthropoda
- Subphylum: Chelicerata
- Class: Arachnida
- Order: Araneae
- Infraorder: Araneomorphae
- Family: Clubionidae
- Genus: Simalio; Simon, 1897

Type species
- S. petilus Simon, 1897

Species
- 8, see text

Genus of spiders

Simalio is a genus of sac spiders first described by Eugène Simon in 1897.

== Species ==
As of April 2019 it contains eight species from Sri Lanka and India to southeast Asia, with one species restricted to Trinidad:

- Simalio aurobindoi Patel & Reddy, 1991 – India
- Simalio biswasi Majumder & Tikader, 1991 – India
- Simalio castaneiceps Simon, 1906 – India
- Simalio lucorum Simon, 1906 – Sri Lanka
- Simalio percomis Simon, 1906 – India
- Simalio petilus Simon, 1897 (type) – Philippines
- Simalio phaeocephalus Simon, 1906 – Sri Lanka
- Simalio rubidus Simon, 1897 – Trinidad
