= Clubiona africana =

African Short Legged Sac Spider

Conservation status
- Least Concern (SANBI Red List)

Scientific classification
- Kingdom: Animalia
- Phylum: Arthropoda
- Subphylum: Chelicerata
- Class: Arachnida
- Order: Araneae
- Infraorder: Araneomorphae
- Family: Clubionidae
- Genus: Clubiona
- Species: C. africana

Binomial name
- Clubiona africana Lessert, 1921

Species of spider

Clubiona africana is a species of spider in the family Clubionidae. It is an African endemic species originally described from Tanzania and also recorded in South Africa.

== Distribution ==
Clubiona africana is distributed across eastern Africa. In South Africa, the species has been recorded from seven provinces at elevations ranging from 103 to 1902 m. It occurs in the Eastern Cape, Free State, Gauteng, KwaZulu-Natal, Limpopo, Mpumalanga, and Western Cape provinces.

== Habitat ==
The species is a free-living plant dweller found in the Grassland, Nama Karoo, Savanna, Succulent Karoo and Thicket biomes. It has been collected from various agricultural crops including avocado, citrus and macadamia orchards, tomato fields and vineyards.

== Description ==
Both males and females are known to science.

== Conservation ==
The species is listed as Least Concern due to its wide geographical range across Africa. In South Africa, it is protected in seven protected areas.
