= Clubiona aspidiphora =

Komaggas Short Legged Sac Spider

Scientific classification
- Kingdom: Animalia
- Phylum: Arthropoda
- Subphylum: Chelicerata
- Class: Arachnida
- Order: Araneae
- Infraorder: Araneomorphae
- Family: Clubionidae
- Genus: Clubiona
- Species: C. aspidiphora

Binomial name
- Clubiona aspidiphora Simon, 1910

Species of spider

Clubiona aspidiphora is a species of spider in the family Clubionidae. It is a southern African endemic species known from Namibia and South Africa.

== Distribution ==
In South Africa, Clubiona aspidiphora is recorded from the Northern Cape province at elevations ranging from 250 to 1155 m. The type locality is Komaggas in the Northern Cape.

== Habitat ==
The species is a free-living plant dweller found in the Desert and Succulent Karoo biomes, adapted to the arid conditions of the region.

== Conservation ==
The species is listed as Data Deficient for taxonomic reasons, as only males are known to science and more sampling is needed to collect females and determine the full species range. It is protected in Richtersveld National Park and Tswalu Kalahari Reserve.
