= Clubiona annuligera =

Short-Legged Sac Spider

Conservation status
- Least Concern (SANBI Red List)

Scientific classification
- Kingdom: Animalia
- Phylum: Arthropoda
- Subphylum: Chelicerata
- Class: Arachnida
- Order: Araneae
- Infraorder: Araneomorphae
- Family: Clubionidae
- Genus: Clubiona
- Species: C. annuligera

Binomial name
- Clubiona annuligera Lessert, 1929

Species of spider

Clubiona annuligera is a species of spider in the family Clubionidae. It is an African endemic species originally described from the Democratic Republic of the Congo and known from four African countries including Mozambique, Malawi, and South Africa.

== Distribution ==
In South Africa, Clubiona annuligera is known only from KwaZulu-Natal and Limpopo provinces. The species has a limited distribution within the country but is more widespread across Africa.

== Habitat ==
The species is a free-living plant dweller found in the Savanna biome. It inhabits areas with dense vegetation where it can construct its characteristic sac-like retreats.

== Description ==
Both males and females are known to science.

== Conservation ==
The species is listed as Least Concern due to its wide geographical range across Africa. In South Africa, it is protected in Lekgalameetse Nature Reserve and Ndumo Game Reserve.
