= Nusatidia bimaculata =

Scientific classification
- Kingdom: Animalia
- Phylum: Arthropoda
- Subphylum: Chelicerata
- Class: Arachnida
- Order: Araneae
- Infraorder: Araneomorphae
- Family: Clubionidae
- Genus: Nusatidia
- Species: N. bimaculata

Binomial name
- Nusatidia bimaculata (Simon, 1897)

Species of spider

Nusatidia bimaculata is a species of spider of the genus Nusatidia. It is endemic to Sri Lanka.
