= Clubiona kiboschensis =

Tanzanian Short Legged Sac Spider

Conservation status
- Least Concern (SANBI Red List)

Scientific classification
- Kingdom: Animalia
- Phylum: Arthropoda
- Subphylum: Chelicerata
- Class: Arachnida
- Order: Araneae
- Infraorder: Araneomorphae
- Family: Clubionidae
- Genus: Clubiona
- Species: C. kiboschensis

Binomial name
- Clubiona kiboschensis Lessert, 1921

Species of spider

Clubiona kiboschensis is a species of spider in the family Clubionidae. It is an African endemic species originally described from Tanzania and also recorded from South Africa.

== Distribution ==
In South Africa, Clubiona kiboschensis is known from the Eastern Cape province at an elevation of 16 m. It has been recorded from Jeffrey's Bay and Addo Elephant National Park.

== Habitat ==
The species is a free-living plant dweller found in the Fynbos biome in South Africa. It inhabits coastal vegetation areas.

== Conservation ==
The species is listed as Least Concern due to its wide distribution range in Africa. In South Africa, it is protected in Addo Elephant National Park.
