= Clubionina =

Scientific classification
- Kingdom: Animalia
- Phylum: Arthropoda
- Subphylum: Chelicerata
- Class: Arachnida
- Order: Araneae
- Infraorder: Araneomorphae
- Family: Clubionidae
- Genus: Clubionina; Berland, 1947
- Species: C. pallida

Binomial name
- Clubionina pallida Berland, 1947

Genus of spiders

Clubionina is a monotypic genus of sac spiders containing the single species, Clubionina pallida. It was first described by Lucien Berland in 1947, and has only been found on Île Saint-Paul.
