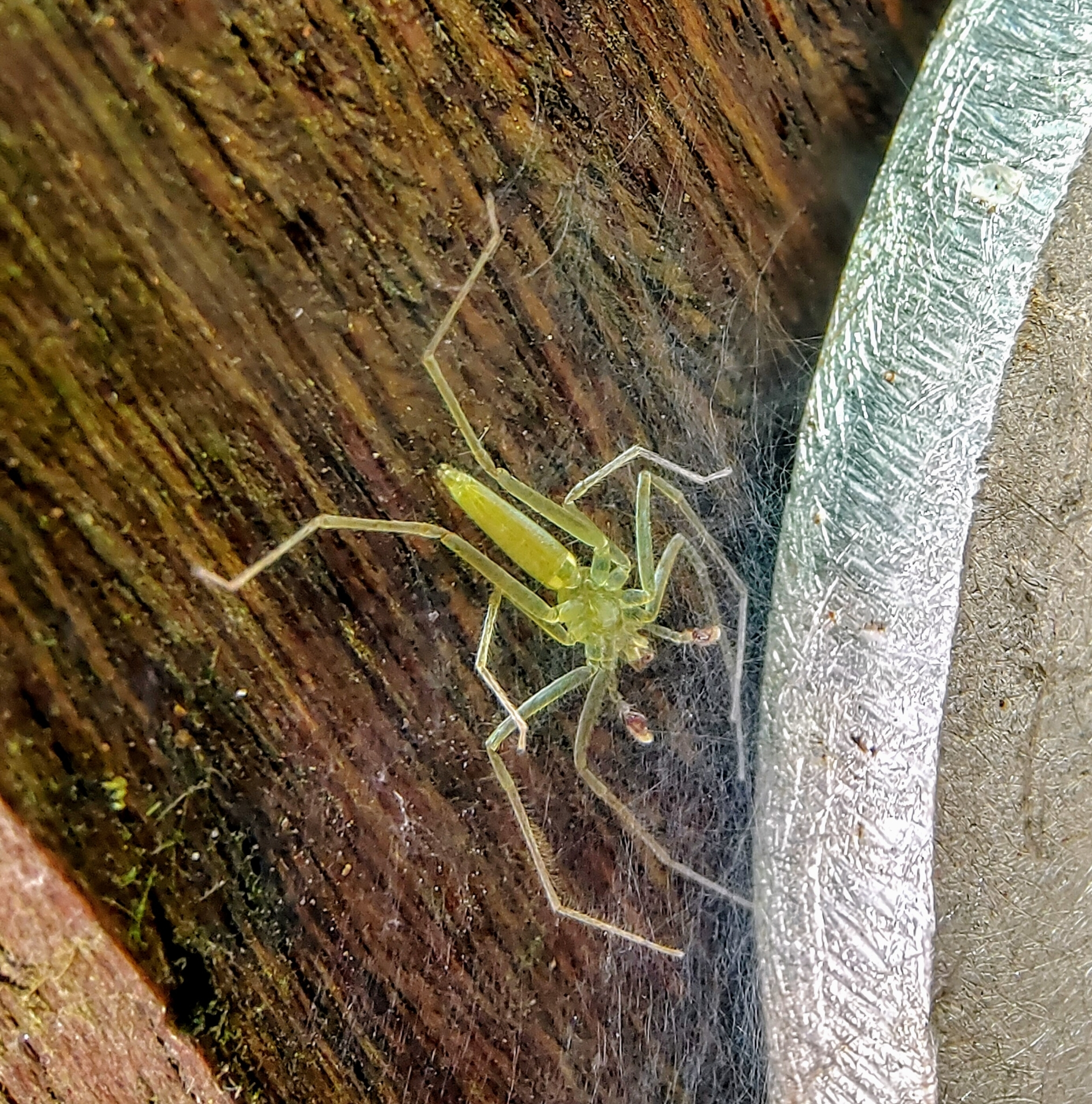

Scientific classification
- Kingdom: Animalia
- Phylum: Arthropoda
- Subphylum: Chelicerata
- Class: Arachnida
- Order: Araneae
- Infraorder: Araneomorphae
- Family: Clubionidae
- Genus: Nusatidia; Deeleman-Reinhold, 2001

Type species
- N. javana (Simon, 1897)

Species
- 14, see text

= Nusatidia =

Genus of spiders

Nusatidia is a genus of Asian sac spiders first described by Christa L. Deeleman-Reinhold in 2001.

== Species ==
As of November 2021 it contains fourteen species:

- Nusatidia aeria (Simon, 1897) – China, Borneo (Malaysia, Brunei), Indonesia (Sumatra)
- Nusatidia bimaculata (Simon, 1897) – Sri Lanka
- Nusatidia borneensis Deeleman-Reinhold, 2001 – Indonesia (Sumatra, Borneo)
- Nusatidia camouflata Deeleman-Reinhold, 2001 – China, Thailand
- Nusatidia changao Yu & Li, 2021 – China
- Nusatidia javana (Simon, 1897) (type) – Indonesia (Java, Krakatau)
- Nusatidia luzonica (Simon, 1897) – Philippines
- Nusatidia manipisea (Barrion & Litsinger, 1995) – Philippines
- Nusatidia melanobursa Deeleman-Reinhold, 2001 – Indonesia (Sumatra)
- Nusatidia mianju Yu & Li, 2021 – China
- Nusatidia pandalira Barrion-Dupo, Barrion & Heong, 2013 – China
- Nusatidia snazelli Deeleman-Reinhold, 2001 – Indonesia (Java, Sumatra)
- Nusatidia subjavana Yu & Li, 2021 – China
- Nusatidia vietnamensis Logunov & Jäger, 2015 – Vietnam
