= Tixcocoba =

Scientific classification
- Kingdom: Animalia
- Phylum: Arthropoda
- Subphylum: Chelicerata
- Class: Arachnida
- Order: Araneae
- Infraorder: Araneomorphae
- Family: Clubionidae
- Genus: Tixcocoba; Gertsch, 1977
- Species: T. maya

Binomial name
- Tixcocoba maya Gertsch, 1977

Genus of spiders

Tixcocoba is a monotypic genus of North American sac spiders containing the single species, Tixcocoba maya. It was first described by Willis J. Gertsch in 1977, and has only been found in Mexico.
