= Clubiona nigromaculosa =

Conservation status
- Endangered (IUCN 3.1)

Scientific classification
- Kingdom: Animalia
- Phylum: Arthropoda
- Subphylum: Chelicerata
- Class: Arachnida
- Order: Araneae
- Infraorder: Araneomorphae
- Family: Clubionidae
- Genus: Clubiona
- Species: C. nigromaculosa

Binomial name
- Clubiona nigromaculosa Blackwall, 1877

Species of spider

Clubiona nigromaculosa is a species of spider in the family Clubionidae. It is an endangered species endemic to the Seychelles.

== Range and habitat ==
C. nigromaculosa is known from the islands of Anonyme, Aride, Cousin, Mahé, and Silhouette in the Seychelles, though in recent years it has only been recorded from Aride, Cousin, and Silhouette. It can be found in coastal, lowland, and mid-altitude woodlands at elevations from sea level up to 500 m (1,600 ft), though it is most abundant at sea level.

== Conservation status ==
C. nigromaculosa is listed as endangered by the International Union for the Conservation of Nature under criteria B1ab(iii) and B2ab(iii), based on its restricted range and the decline of its habitat.
