= Scopalio =

Scientific classification
- Domain: Eukaryota
- Kingdom: Animalia
- Phylum: Arthropoda
- Subphylum: Chelicerata
- Class: Arachnida
- Order: Araneae
- Infraorder: Araneomorphae
- Family: Clubionidae
- Genus: Scopalio; Deeleman-Reinhold, 2001
- Species: S. verrens

Binomial name
- Scopalio verrens Deeleman-Reinhold, 2001

Genus of spiders

Scopalio is a monotypic genus of Indonesian sac spiders containing the single species, Scopalio verrens. It was first described by Christa L. Deeleman-Reinhold in 2001, and has only been found in Indonesia.
