= Clubiona nollothensis =

Port Nolloth Short Legged Sac Spider

Scientific classification
- Kingdom: Animalia
- Phylum: Arthropoda
- Subphylum: Chelicerata
- Class: Arachnida
- Order: Araneae
- Infraorder: Araneomorphae
- Family: Clubionidae
- Genus: Clubiona
- Species: C. nollothensis

Binomial name
- Clubiona nollothensis Simon, 1910

Species of spider

Clubiona nollothensis is a species of spider in the family Clubionidae. It is endemic to the Northern Cape province of South Africa, originally described from Port Nolloth.

== Distribution ==
Clubiona nollothensis is known from a few records in the Northern Cape at elevations ranging from 33 to 623 m. It has been recorded from Port Nolloth, Augrabies National Park, and Richtersveld National Park.

== Habitat ==
The species is a free-living plant dweller found in the Succulent Karoo and Desert biomes, adapted to arid conditions.

== Conservation ==
The species is listed as Data Deficient for taxonomic reasons, as only females are known to science and more sampling is needed to collect males and determine the species' range. It is protected in Augrabies National Park and Richtersveld National Park.
