= Hwanghaksan =

Mountain in South Korea

Highest point
- Elevation: 912 m (2,992 ft)

Geography
- Location: North Gyeongsang Province, South Korea

Hwanghaksan is a mountain of North Gyeongsang Province, eastern South Korea. It has an elevation of 912 metres.

== See also ==
- List of mountains of Korea
