= Simalio phaeocephalus =

Scientific classification
- Kingdom: Animalia
- Phylum: Arthropoda
- Subphylum: Chelicerata
- Class: Arachnida
- Order: Araneae
- Infraorder: Araneomorphae
- Family: Clubionidae
- Genus: Simalio
- Species: S. phaeocephalus

Binomial name
- Simalio phaeocephalus Simon, 1906

Species of spider

Simalio phaeocephalus is a species of spider of the genus Simalio. It is endemic to Sri Lanka.
