= Ramosatidia =

Scientific classification
- Kingdom: Animalia
- Phylum: Arthropoda
- Subphylum: Chelicerata
- Class: Arachnida
- Order: Araneae
- Infraorder: Araneomorphae
- Family: Clubionidae
- Genus: Ramosatidia; Yu & Li, 2021
- Species: R. situ

Binomial name
- Ramosatidia situ Yu & Li, 2021

Genus of spiders

Ramosatidia is a monotypic genus of east Asian sac spiders containing the single species, Ramosatidia situ. It was first described by J. S. Zhang, H. Yu and S. Q. Li in 2021, and it has only been found in China.
