= Clubiona rumpiana =

Red Short Legged Sac Spider

Scientific classification
- Kingdom: Animalia
- Phylum: Arthropoda
- Subphylum: Chelicerata
- Class: Arachnida
- Order: Araneae
- Infraorder: Araneomorphae
- Family: Clubionidae
- Genus: Clubiona
- Species: C. rumpiana

Binomial name
- Clubiona rumpiana Lawrence, 1952

Species of spider

Clubiona rumpiana is a species of spider in the family Clubionidae. It is endemic to KwaZulu-Natal, South Africa, originally described from Dargle.

== Distribution ==
Clubiona rumpiana is known from a few locations in KwaZulu-Natal at elevations ranging from 32 to 1142 m. It has been recorded from Dargle, iSimangaliso Wetland Park, Umhlali, and Kloof.

== Habitat ==
The species is a free-living plant dweller found in the Savanna and Indian Ocean Coastal Belt biomes. It inhabits coastal and inland vegetation areas.

== Conservation ==
The species is listed as Data Deficient for taxonomic reasons, as only males are known to science and more sampling is needed to collect females and determine the species' range. The species is threatened by habitat loss due to urbanization and agricultural activities at Umhlali and Dargle.
