= Clubiona chathamensis =

Conservation status
- Data Deficit (NZ TCS)

Scientific classification
- Kingdom: Animalia
- Phylum: Arthropoda
- Subphylum: Chelicerata
- Class: Arachnida
- Order: Araneae
- Infraorder: Araneomorphae
- Family: Clubionidae
- Genus: Clubiona
- Species: C. chathamensis

Binomial name
- Clubiona chathamensis Simon, 1905

Species of spider

Clubiona chathamensis is a species of Clubionidae spider endemic to New Zealand.

== Taxonomy ==
This species was described in 1905 by Eugène Simon from male specimens. In 1979, it was hypothesized to be a synonym of Otagoa chathamensis, although this hasn't been validated.

== Description ==
The male is recorded at 5mm in length.

== Distribution ==
This species is only known from Chatham Island, New Zealand.

== Conservation status ==
Under the New Zealand Threat Classification System, this species is listed as "Data Poor: Size" and "Data Poor: Trend".
