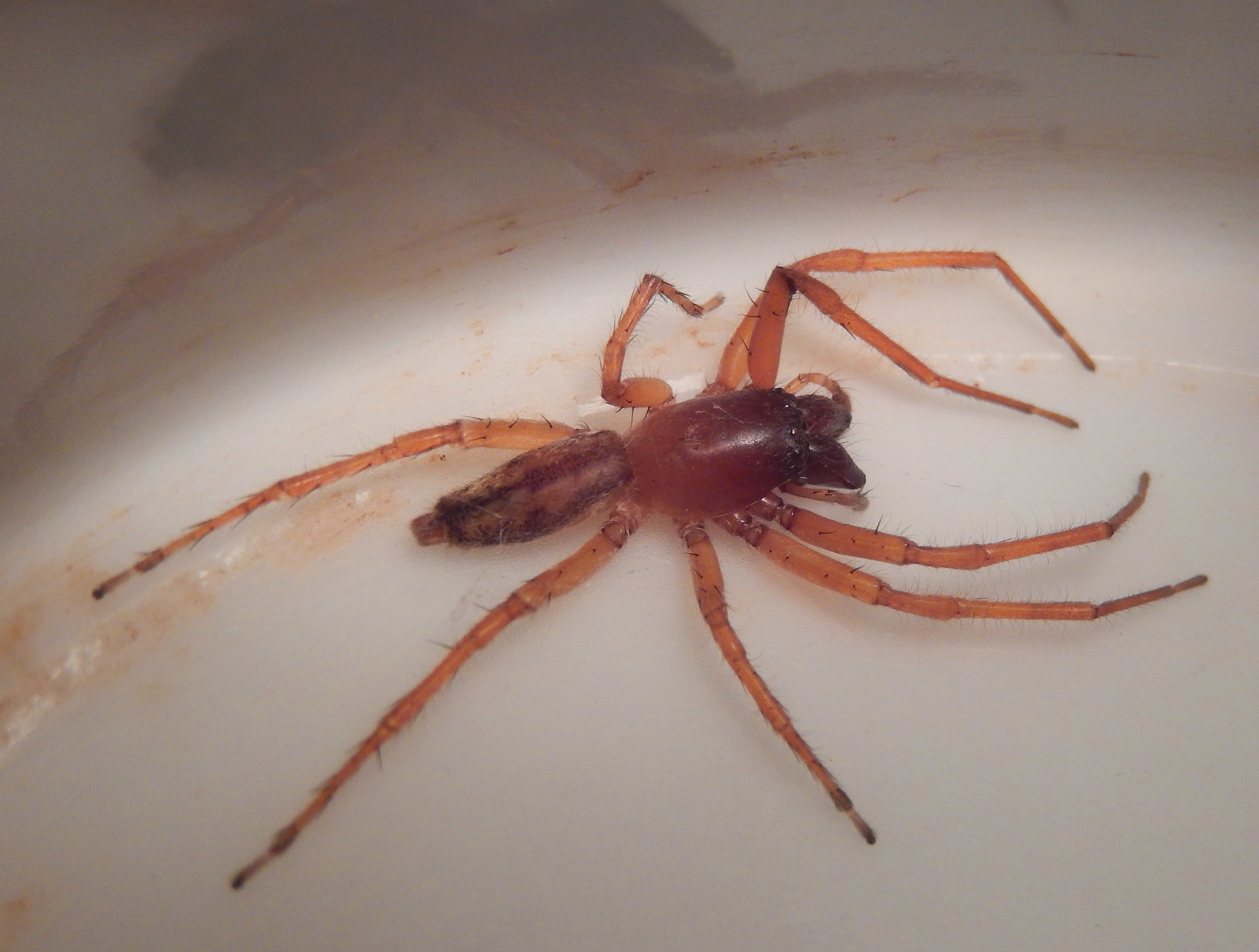

Scientific classification
- Kingdom: Animalia
- Phylum: Arthropoda
- Subphylum: Chelicerata
- Class: Arachnida
- Order: Araneae
- Infraorder: Araneomorphae
- Family: Clubionidae
- Genus: Clubiona
- Species: C. robusta

Binomial name
- Clubiona robusta L.Koch 1873

= Clubiona robusta =

Species of spider

Clubiona robusta or the stout sac spider is a common spider found in Australia. Females are often found living in a silken brooding chamber, under bark of eucalyptus trees. They are small sized spiders. Body length is 13 mm for females and 10 mm for males.
