= Clubiona abboti =

Conservation status
- Secure (NatureServe)

Scientific classification
- Kingdom: Animalia
- Phylum: Arthropoda
- Subphylum: Chelicerata
- Class: Arachnida
- Order: Araneae
- Infraorder: Araneomorphae
- Family: Clubionidae
- Genus: Clubiona
- Species: C. abboti

Binomial name
- Clubiona abboti L. Koch, 1866

Species of spider

Clubiona abboti is a species of sac spider in the family Clubionidae. It is found in the United States and Canada.

== Subspecies ==
These two subspecies belong to the species Clubiona abboti:

- (Clubiona abboti abboti) L. Koch, 1866
- Clubiona abboti abbotoides Chamberlin & Ivie, 1946
