= Clubiona torta =

Conservation status
- Data Deficit (NZ TCS)

Scientific classification
- Kingdom: Animalia
- Phylum: Arthropoda
- Subphylum: Chelicerata
- Class: Arachnida
- Order: Araneae
- Infraorder: Araneomorphae
- Family: Clubionidae
- Genus: Clubiona
- Species: C. torta

Binomial name
- Clubiona torta Forster, 1979

Species of spider

Clubiona torta is a species of Clubionidae spider endemic to New Zealand.

== Taxonomy ==
This species was described in 1979 by Ray Forster from a female specimen. The holotype is stored in Otago Museum.

== Description ==
The female is recorded at 5.7 mm (0.22 in) in length. The carapace and legs are orange brown. The abdomen has a dorsal medial band and shading laterally.

== Distribution ==
This species is only known from Nelson, New Zealand.

== Conservation status ==
Under the New Zealand Threat Classification System, this species is listed as "Data Deficient" with the qualifiers of "Data Poor: Size", "Data Poor: Trend" and "One Location".
