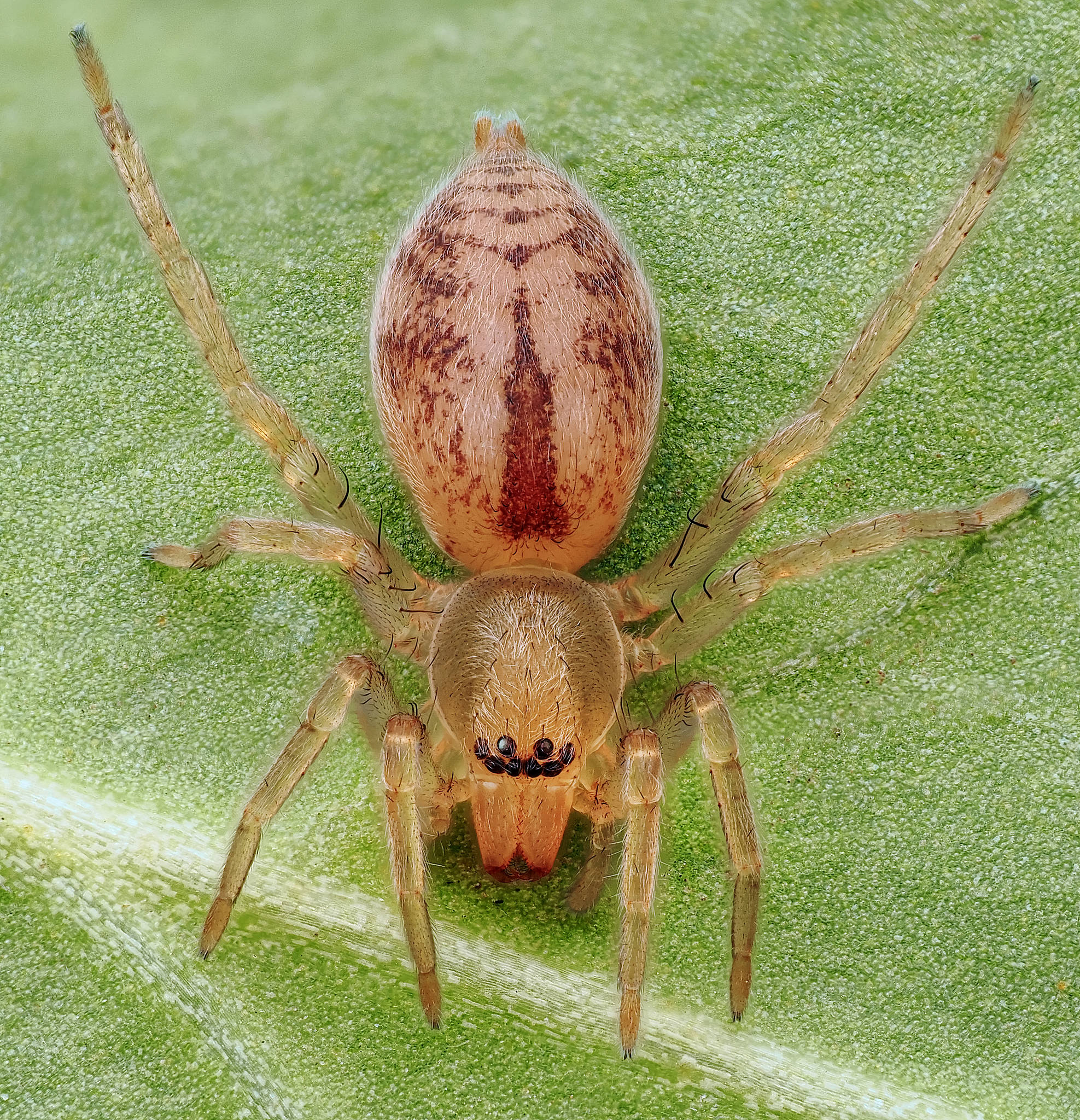
- Female

Scientific classification
- Kingdom: Animalia
- Phylum: Arthropoda
- Subphylum: Chelicerata
- Class: Arachnida
- Order: Araneae
- Infraorder: Araneomorphae
- Family: Clubionidae
- Genus: Clubiona
- Species: C. comta

Binomial name
- Clubiona comta C. L. Koch, 1839

= Clubiona comta =

Species of spider

Clubiona comta is a species of sac spider (family Clubionidae) found in Europe, North Africa, Turkey and the Caucasus.
