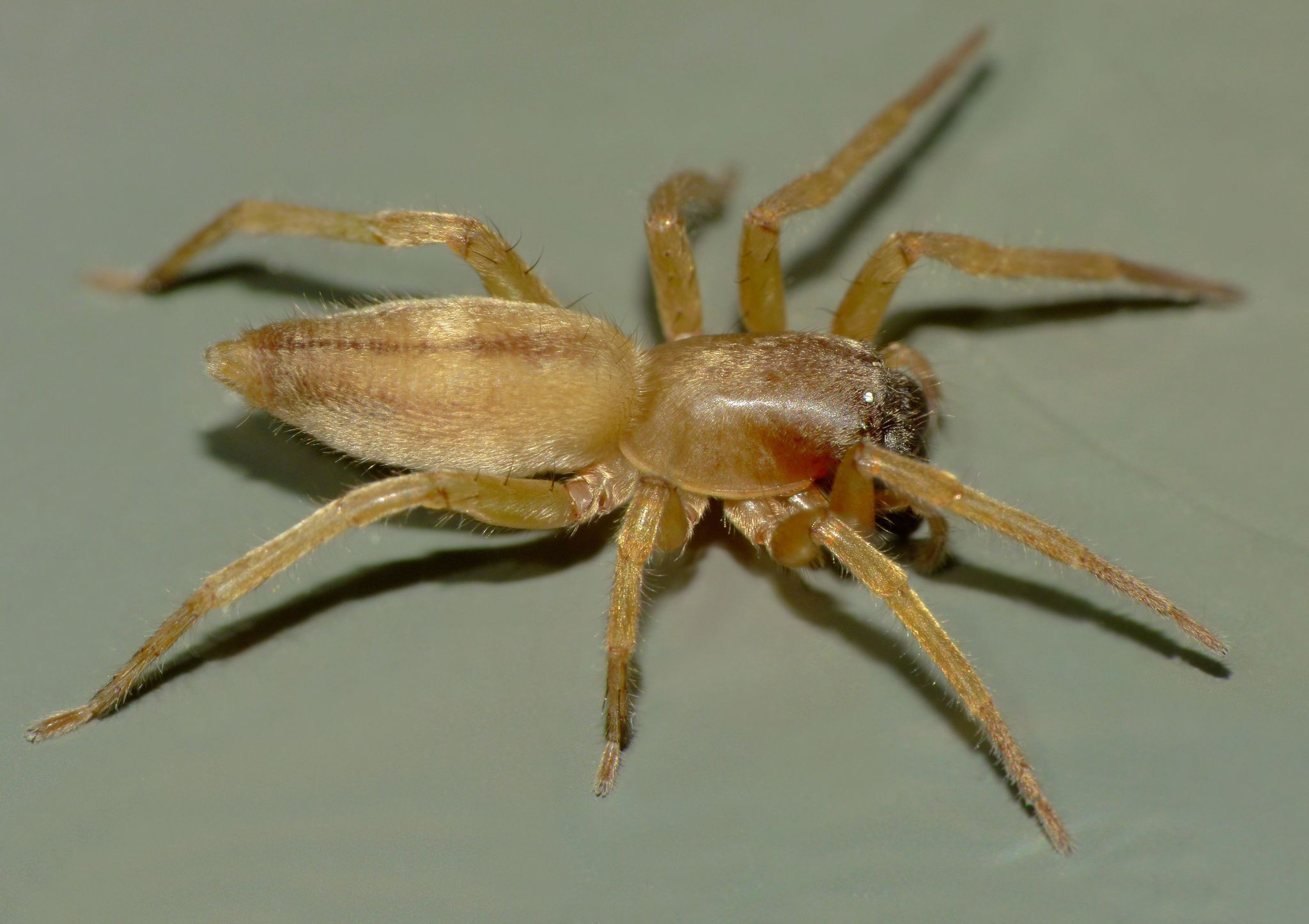

Conservation status
- Not Threatened (NZ TCS)

Scientific classification
- Kingdom: Animalia
- Phylum: Arthropoda
- Subphylum: Chelicerata
- Class: Arachnida
- Order: Araneae
- Infraorder: Araneomorphae
- Family: Clubionidae
- Genus: Clubiona
- Species: C. cambridgei

Binomial name
- Clubiona cambridgei Koch, 1873

= Clubiona cambridgei =

Species of spider

Clubiona cambridgei is a species of Clubionidae spider endemic to New Zealand.

== Taxonomy ==
This species was described in 1873 by Ludwig Carl Christian Koch from male and female specimens. It was most recently revised in 1979. The syntype is stored in the Oxford University Museum of Natural History.

== Description ==
The male and female are recorded at 7.5mm in length. This species has an orange brown carapace. The legs are straw brown. The abdomen is cream coloured with a dorsal stripe and chevron pattern markings.

== Distribution ==
This species is widespread throughout New Zealand. It is usually associated with flax bushes and cabbage trees in marshy habitats.

== Conservation status ==
Under the New Zealand Threat Classification System, this species is listed as "Not Threatened".
