= Clubiona mimula =

Scientific classification
- Kingdom: Animalia
- Phylum: Arthropoda
- Subphylum: Chelicerata
- Class: Arachnida
- Order: Araneae
- Infraorder: Araneomorphae
- Family: Clubionidae
- Genus: Clubiona
- Species: C. mimula

Binomial name
- Clubiona mimula Chamberlin, 1928

Species of spider

Clubiona mimula is a species of sac spider in the family Clubionidae. It is found in the United States and Canada.
