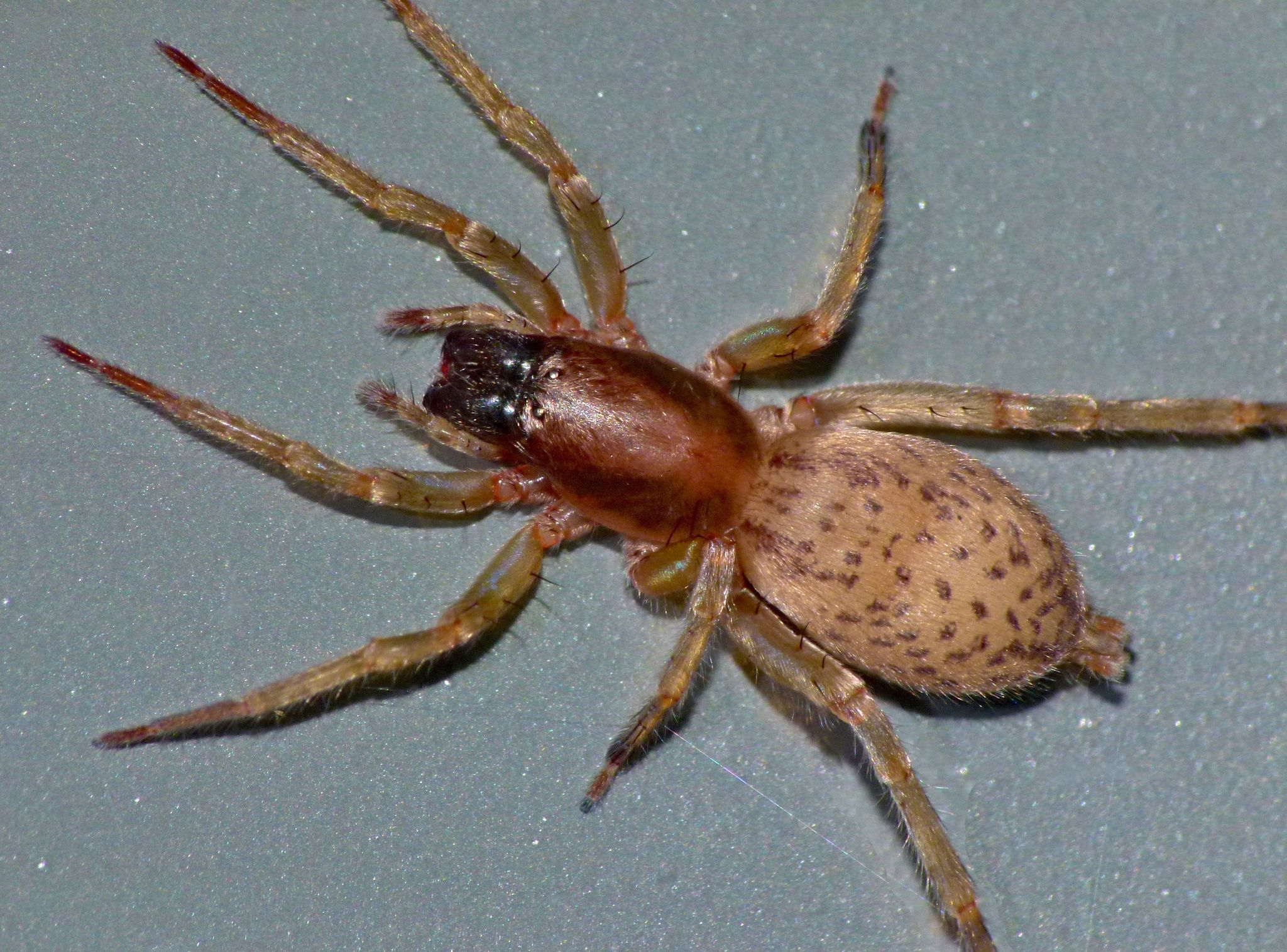

Conservation status
- Not Threatened (NZ TCS)

Scientific classification
- Kingdom: Animalia
- Phylum: Arthropoda
- Subphylum: Chelicerata
- Class: Arachnida
- Order: Araneae
- Infraorder: Araneomorphae
- Family: Clubionidae
- Genus: Clubiona
- Species: C. huttoni

Binomial name
- Clubiona huttoni Forster, 1979

= Clubiona huttoni =

Species of spider

Clubiona huttoni is a species of Clubionidae spider endemic to New Zealand.

== Taxonomy ==
This species was described in 1979 by Ray Forster from male and female specimens. The holotype is stored in Otago Museum.

== Description ==
The male is recorded at 6.75mm in length whereas the female is 7.5mm. The cephalothorax and legs are pale yellow brown. The abdomen is covered in black spots dorsally, with a few spots ventrally.

== Distribution and habitat ==
This species is widespread throughout New Zealand. It has been considered New Zealand's most common species of Clubiona. It is primarily found along forest margins and in scrub habitat.

== Conservation status ==
Under the New Zealand Threat Classification System, this species is listed as "Not Threatened".
