= Klipriviersberg Nature Reserve =

Largest nature reserve in Johannesburg

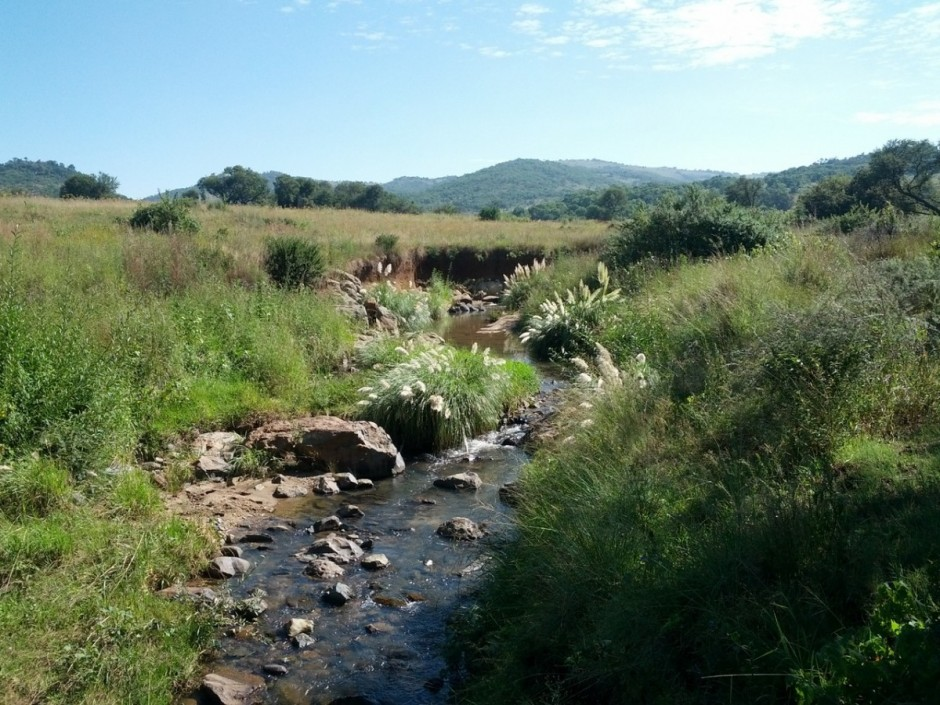
- Bloubosspruit in the Klipriviersberg Nature Reserve
- Interactive map of Klipriviersberg Nature Reserve
- Type: Nature reserve
- Location: Peggy Vera Road, Kibler Park, Gauteng
- Nearest city: Johannesburg
- Coordinates: 26°18′13″S 28°0′39″E
- Area: 680 hectares (1,700 acres)
- Created: 9 October 1984
- Operator: Johannesburg City Parks
- Open: All year
- Camp sites: None
- Hiking trails: Nine
- Plants: 650 – 700 species
- Species: Large game 215 birds species
- Parking: Main Entrance – Peggy Vera Road, Kibler Park; Northern entrance – Frandaph Drive, Mondeor
- Website: www.jhbcityparks.com klipriviersberg.org.za

Klipriviersberg Nature Reserve is a nature reserve consisting of veld and koppies (hills) run by the Johannesburg City Parks. It is located 11 kilometres (6.8 mi) south of Johannesburg, in an area of 640 hectares (1,600 acres). Home to many species of flora and bird life, it is also home to large and small mammals such as blesbok, zebra, wildebeest and duiker.

The reserve has a number of hiking trails and archaeological sites, with the Bloubosspruit flowing through the area.

== History ==
Prehistory saw the area inhabited by stone age man who hunted in the area with the location claimed to have the highest concentration of identified Iron Age sites on the Witwatersrand with the discovery of artefacts dating back 250,000 years.

The Sotho-Tswana peoples would later settle in the area in the 1400s and would leave the location around 1800 when possibly climate changes and the movement of more militant tribes into the area saw their departure to Botswana. Their lifestyle consisted of animal husbandry and the growing millet, sorghum and later maize imported into Africa by the Portuguese traders.

Around 1850, Voorttrekker Sarel Marais bought land on a western portion of the Rietvlei farm part of which is the reserve today, and used it for grazing and peach farming. His descendants would eventually sell the farm in 1914 to the Quilliam family who used it for dairy farming and as a piggery. By 1939, the Quilliam family had sold the land to the City of Johannesburg.

After the discovery of gold in the Witwatersrand, the shortage of water saw a proposal to build a dam in the northern part of the reserve. To be called the Vierfontein Dam, work ended on it as the Second Boer War broke out and all that remains across the spruit is the remains of a weir. After the war, the proposal was found to be uneconomical and the Rand Water Board chose the Vaal Dam barrage as a better option.

During the Second Boer War, the hills around the reserve were used by Boers in the defence of Johannesburg against the southern advance of the British forces under Lord Roberts from the direction of Vereeniging.

In the late 1970s residents of the area petitioned the Johannesburg City Council to declare the area as nature reserve. The council asked the residents to form an association to assist the council in the proposed reserves management and was formed as the Klipriviersberg Nature Reserve Association; the nature reserve was proclaimed in 1984.

== Fauna and flora ==
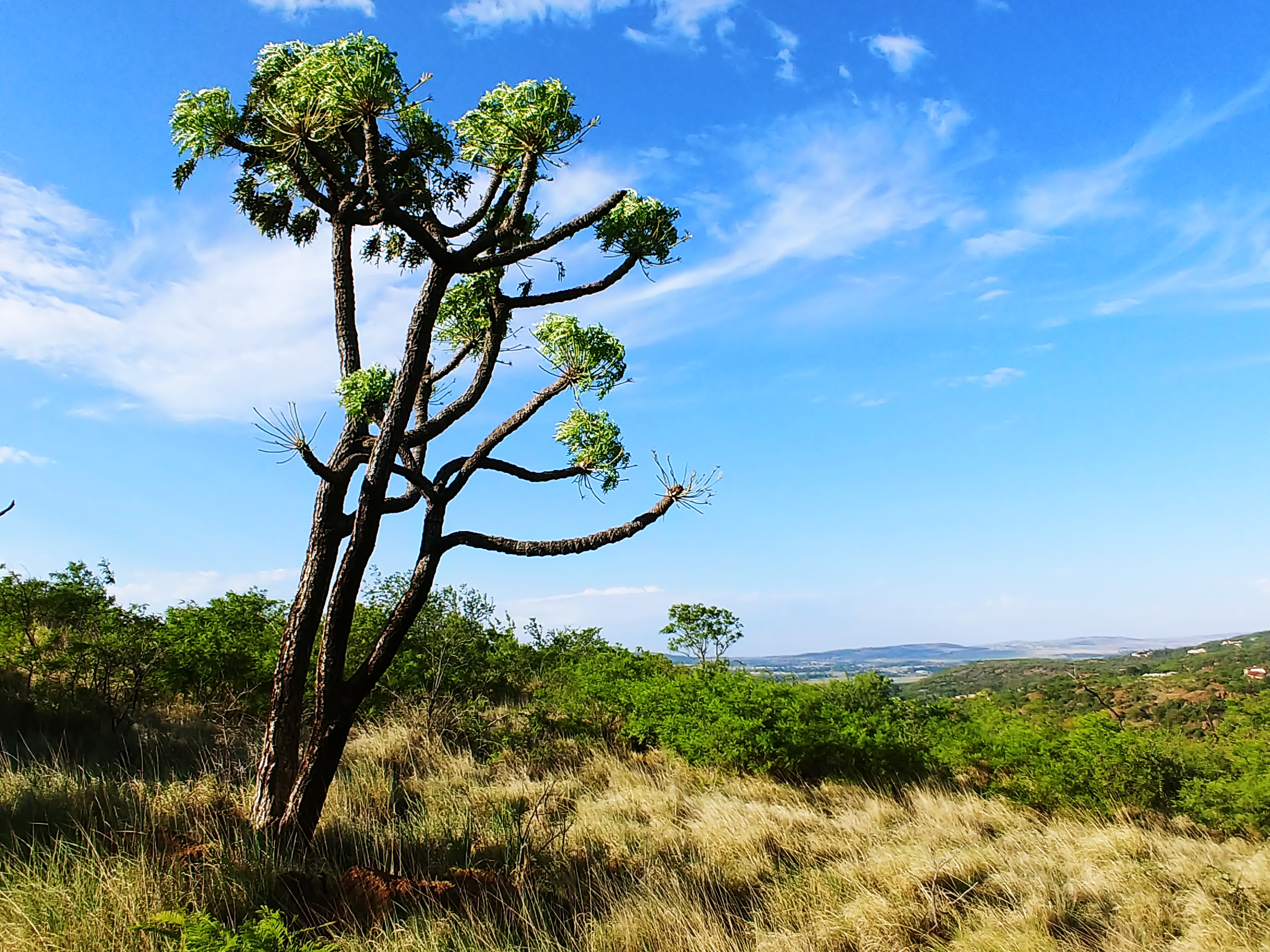

Large mammals such as Black Wildebeest, Blesbok, Springbok, Red Hartebeest and Zebra are found in the reserve with approximately 240 of these large animals. Also found are numerous small mammals. 215 species of bird life have been recorded in the reserve as well as snakes, geckos, lizards, skinks and terrapins. It is also a haven for insect life such as butterflies and spiders. There is said to be between 650—700 species of plants in the reserve. Over 340 wild flowers, 67 tree and shrub types as well as 70 grasses species have been catalogued.

== Recreation ==
The fenced reserve is open all year round from dawn to dusk. The ruins of Marais' farmhouse, wagon shelter and family cemetery can still be seen today. There are also nine trails to hike, amounting to 20 kilometres (12 mi). To the north of the reserve is the Silent Pool, the result of a hole dug during the construction of the proposed dam. The reserve can be entered at two points:

- The main entrance in Peggy Vera Road, Kibler Park. (Note: Peggy Vera Rd entrance 26°18′14″S 28°00′39″E)
- Silent Pool entrance in from Frandalph Drive, Mondeor. (Note: Frandalph Dr entrance 26°17′00″S 28°00′35″E)

== Gallery ==
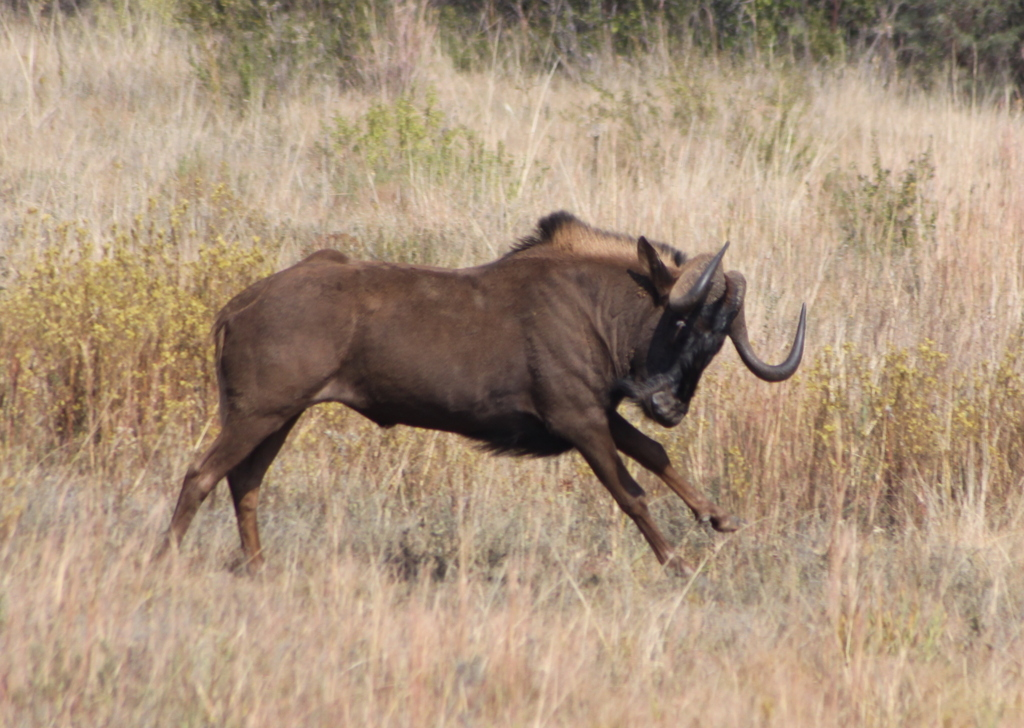
Black Wildebeest

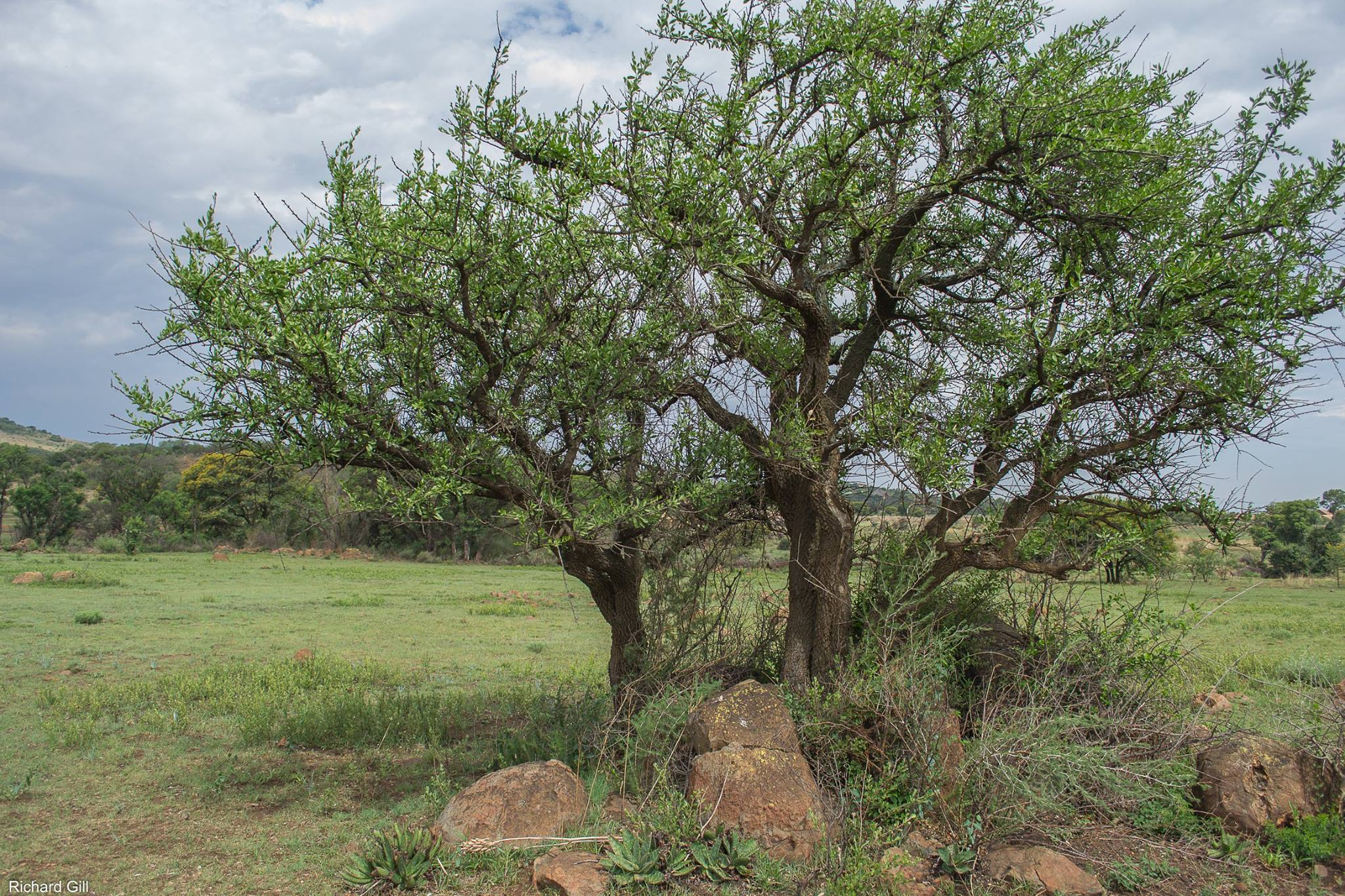
Gymnosporia buxifolia

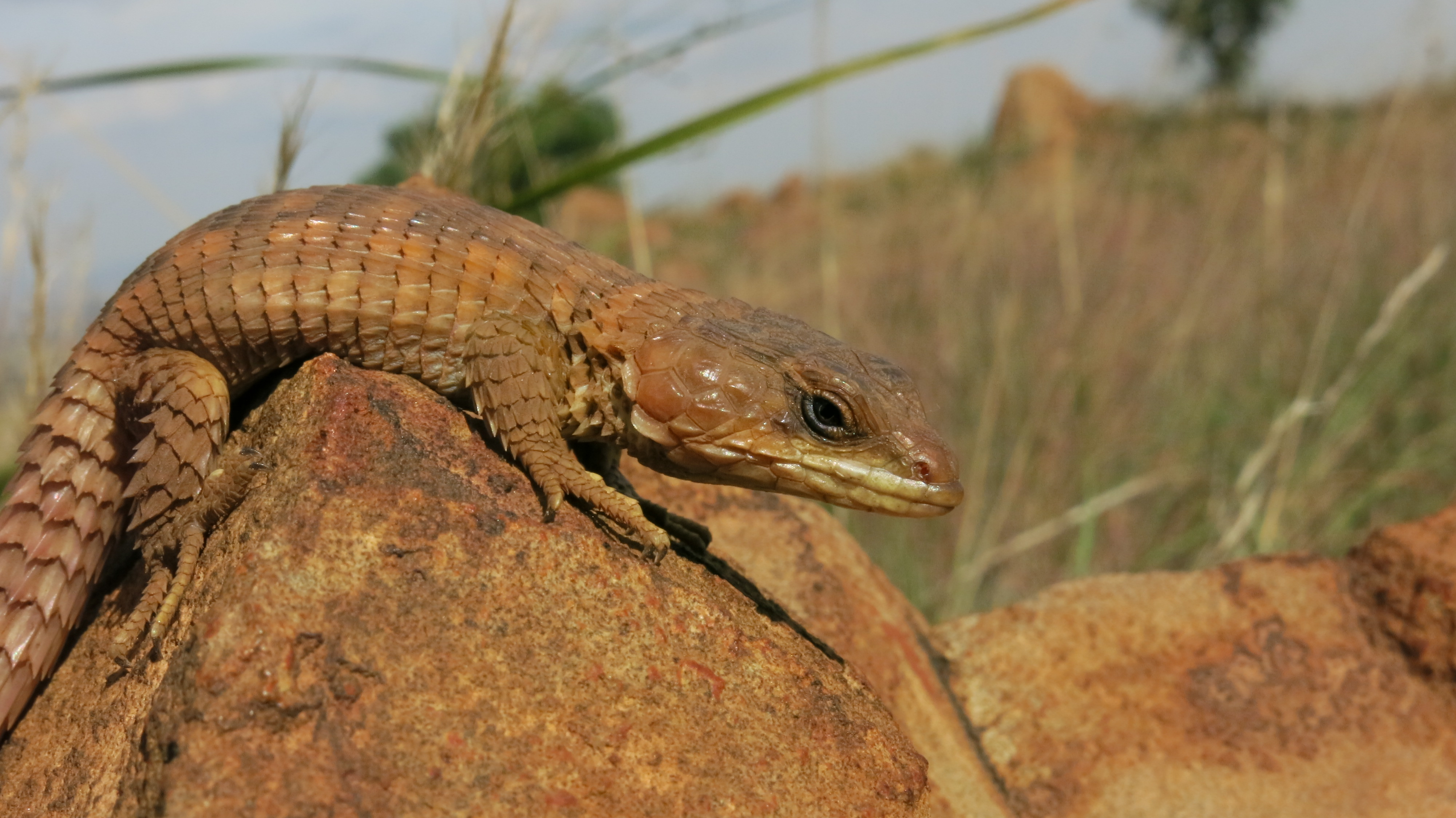
Transvaal Girdled Lizard

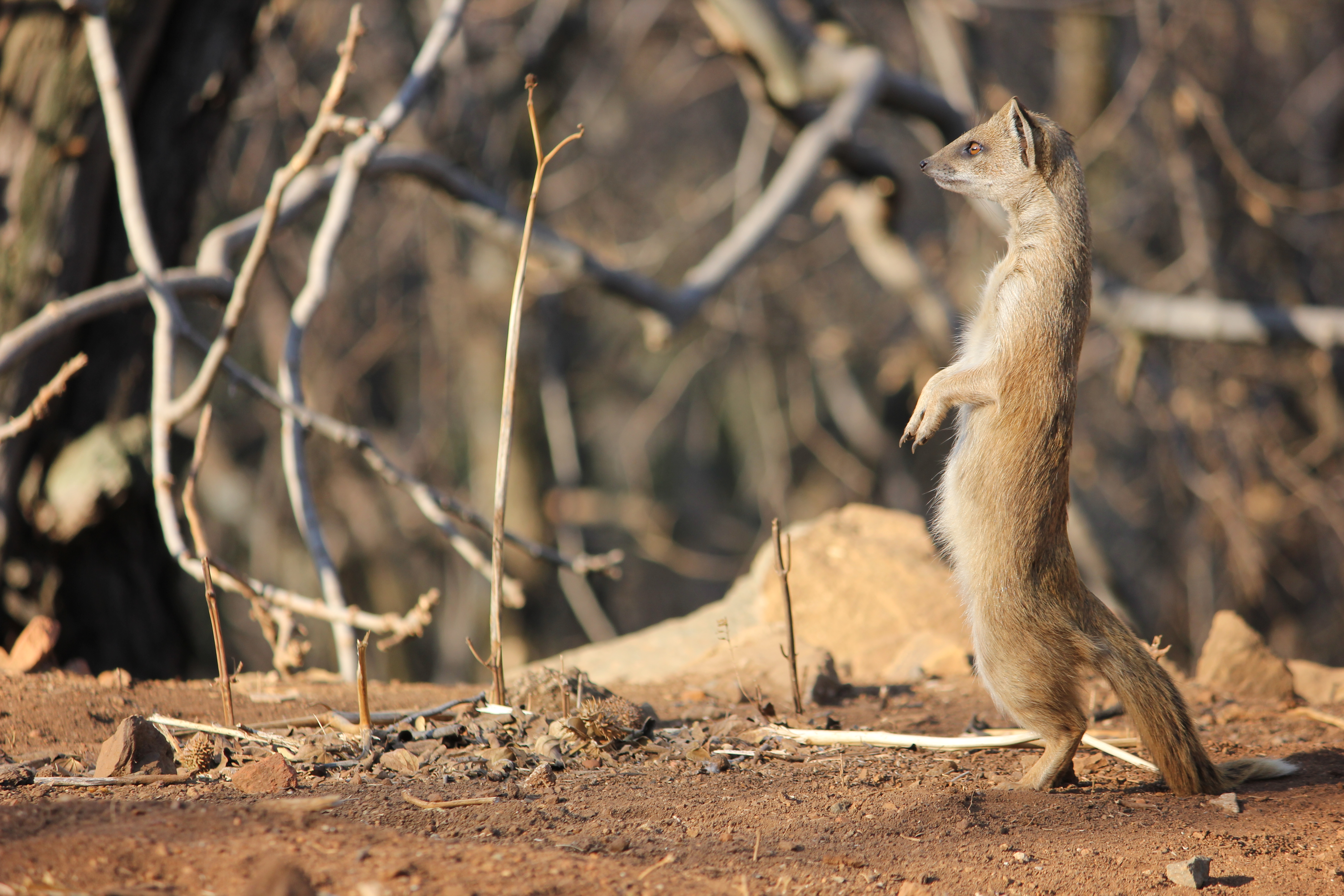
Yellow Mongoose
