= C. terrestris =

C. terrestris may refer to:

- Callitriche terrestris, a plant species
- Chiropterotriton terrestris, a salamander species
- Clubiona terrestris, a sac spider species found in Europe
- Coelotes terrestris, a tangled nest spider species in the genus Coelotes

== See also ==
- Terrestris
