= Troglocoelotes =

Scientific classification
- Kingdom: Animalia
- Phylum: Arthropoda
- Subphylum: Chelicerata
- Class: Arachnida
- Order: Araneae
- Infraorder: Araneomorphae
- Family: Agelenidae
- Genus: Troglocoelotes; Zhao & S. Q. Li, 2019

Type species
- T. yumiganensis Zhao & S. Q. Li, 2019

Species
- 9, see text

Genus of spiders

Troglocoelotes is a genus of east Asian funnel weavers. It was first described by B. Li, Z. Zhao and C. T. Zhang in 2019, and it has only been found in China.

== Species ==
As of October 2026 it contains nine species:

- T. bailongensis Zhao & S. Q. Li, 2019 – China
- T. banmenensis Zhao & S. Q. Li, 2019 – China
- T. liangensis Zhao & S. Q. Li, 2019 – China
- T. nongchiensis Zhao & S. Q. Li, 2019 – China
- T. proximus (Chen, Zhu & Kim, 2008) – China
- T. qixianensis Zhao & S. Q. Li, 2019 – China
- T. tortus (Chen, Zhu & Kim, 2008) – China
- T. yosiianus (Nishikawa, 1999) – China
- T. yumiganensis Zhao & S. Q. Li, 2019 (type) – China

== See also ==
- Draconarius
- Coelotes
