= Coelotes alpinus =

Scientific classification
- Kingdom: Animalia
- Phylum: Arthropoda
- Subphylum: Chelicerata
- Class: Arachnida
- Order: Araneae
- Infraorder: Araneomorphae
- Family: Agelenidae
- Genus: Coelotes
- Species: C. alpinus

Binomial name
- Coelotes alpinus Polenec, 1972

Species of spider

Coelotes alpinus is a funnel-web spider species found in Italy, Austria and Slovenia.
