= Inermocoelotes falciger =

Scientific classification
- Kingdom: Animalia
- Phylum: Arthropoda
- Subphylum: Chelicerata
- Class: Arachnida
- Order: Araneae
- Infraorder: Araneomorphae
- Family: Agelenidae
- Genus: Inermocoelotes
- Species: I. falciger

Binomial name
- Inermocoelotes falciger (Kulczynski, 1897)

Species of spider

Inermocoelotes falciger is a funnel-web spider species found in Eastern Europe.
