= Inermocoelotes deltshevi =

Scientific classification
- Kingdom: Animalia
- Phylum: Arthropoda
- Subphylum: Chelicerata
- Class: Arachnida
- Order: Araneae
- Infraorder: Araneomorphae
- Family: Agelenidae
- Genus: Inermocoelotes
- Species: I. deltshevi

Binomial name
- Inermocoelotes deltshevi (Dimitrov, 1996)

Species of spider

Inermocoelotes deltshevi is a funnel-web spider species found in North Macedonia and Bulgaria.
