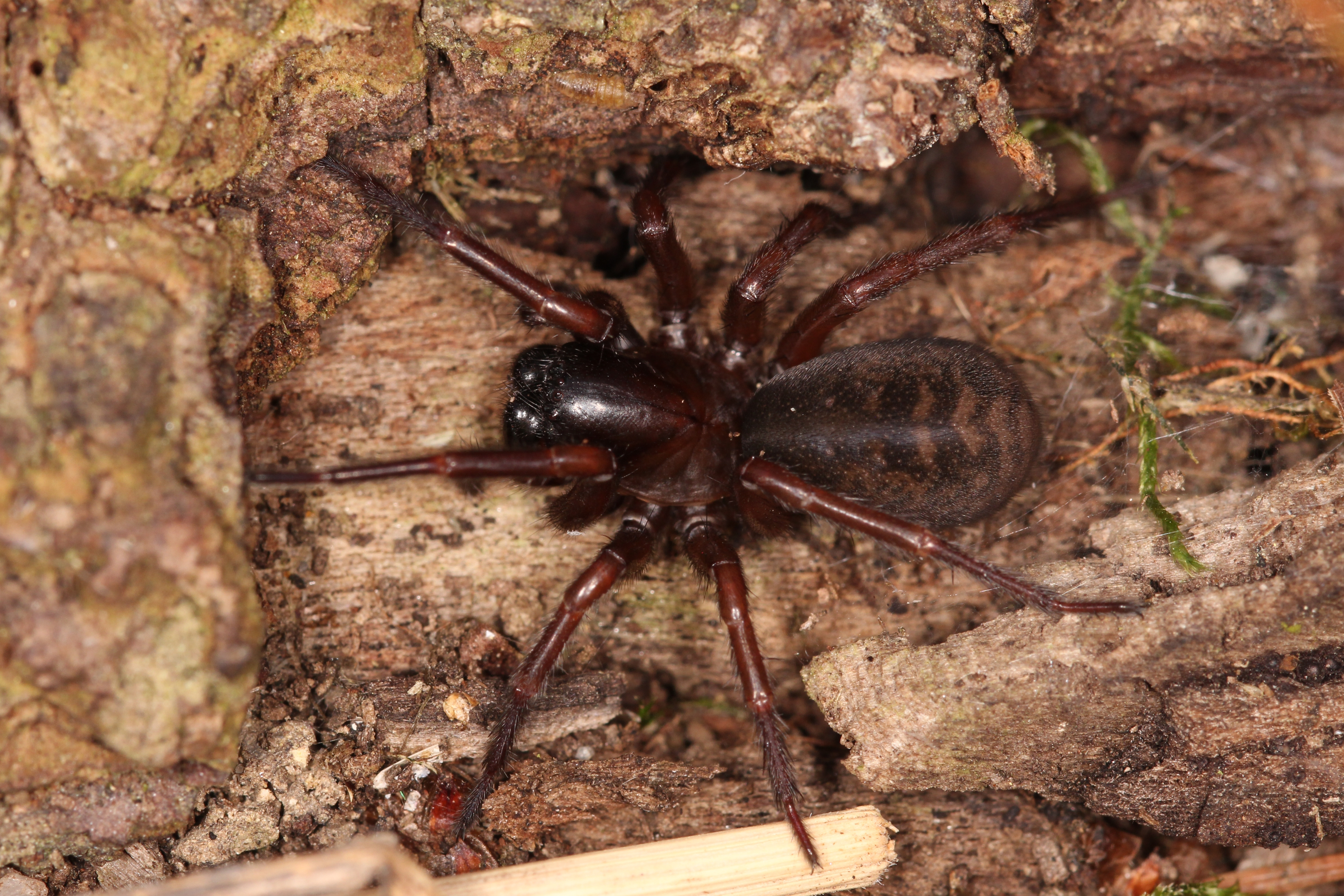
- Female Coelotes terrestris

Scientific classification
- Kingdom: Animalia
- Phylum: Arthropoda
- Subphylum: Chelicerata
- Class: Arachnida
- Order: Araneae
- Infraorder: Araneomorphae
- Family: Agelenidae
- Genus: Coelotes
- Species: C. terrestris

Binomial name
- Coelotes terrestris (Wider, 1834)

Synonyms
- Aranea terrestris Wider, 1834

= Coelotes terrestris =

Species of spider in the family Agelenidae

Coelotes terrestris, the ground-living spider, is a spider in the family Agelenidae that stems from the once-assumed affiliation of the genus Coelotes, including this species, with the family Amaurobiidae, which has since been refuted.

The distribution of Coelotes terrestris extends from Europe to Turkey. It occurs in a broad spectrum of habitats, but is particularly found in forests of various types, where it preferably inhabits the ground level. The abundance of the species depends on the diversity of the forest biotope, including various microhabitats, as well as air humidity. The latter is especially relevant in habitat selection because Coelotes terrestris is rather hemihygrophilous (moisture-loving) and thus avoids habitats that are too dry or too wet.

Like all species in the family Agelenidae, Coelotes terrestris constructs a funnel web typical of the family and named after it for catching prey, though its structure can vary in this species. In addition to the actual web sheet for prey capture, the web also features a retreat tube built in a cavity. Using the catching web, the spider captures a wide range of other invertebrates, particularly beetles. Compared to other spiders, the female of Coelotes terrestris exhibits highly developed parental care. The juveniles remain in the web for some time and are fed by their mother before becoming independent.

== Description ==
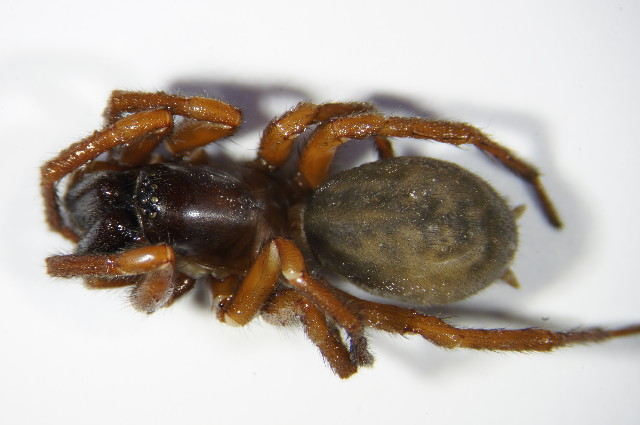
Prepared female in the Bavarian State Collection of Zoology

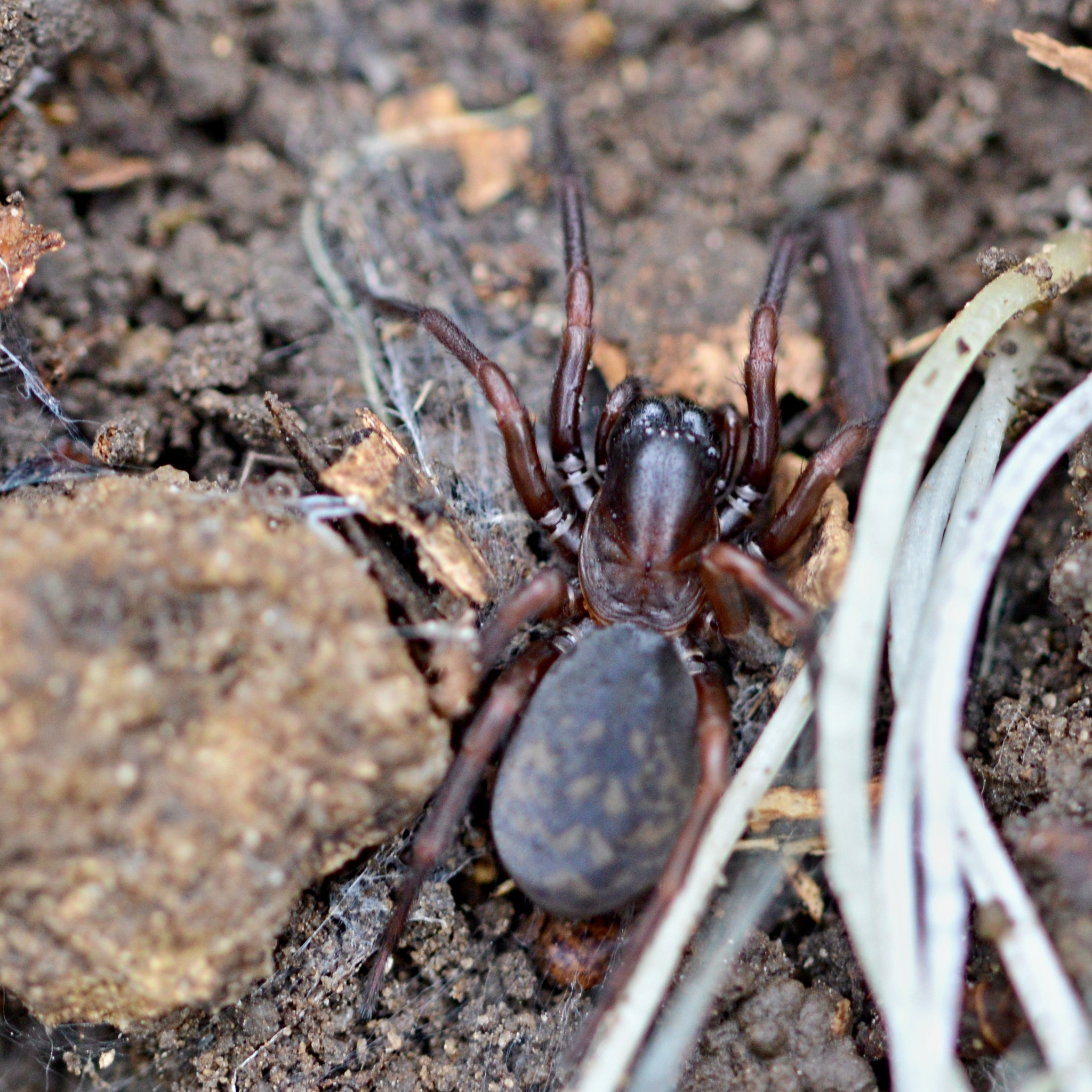
Dorsal view of a female

Females of Coelotes terrestris reach a body length of 10 to 13 mm, males 8 to 10 mm. The body structure corresponds to that of other species in the genus Coelotes.

The prosoma (cephalothorax) of Coelotes terrestris, like other species in Coelotes and unlike other agelenids, is hardly narrowed. The carapace is dark red-brown to black. The sternum appears almost black. The legs are uniformly red-brown to dark red-brown.

The opisthosoma (abdomen) has a dark gray to black-gray base color. Dorsally, there is also a dark median band in the anterior part of the opisthosoma, which narrows posteriorly and transitions into a yellow-gray chevron pattern in the posterior area. Posteriorly on the dorsal surface of the opisthosoma are yellowish-gray lateral stripes. Laterally, the opisthosoma has yellowish-gray patterns.

=== Genital morphology ===
In males of Coelotes terrestris, a single pedipalp, as typical for the genus Coelotes, has an apophysis (chitinized process) on the patella, whose distal edge is distinctly indented. The conductor (sperm duct) of a single bulb (male genital organ) has a narrow, short tip.

The epigyne (external female genital organ) of the species is characterized within the genus particularly by the parallel lateral margins. The anterior margin is strongly pronounced. Between them is a square pit.

=== Differentiation from similar spiders ===
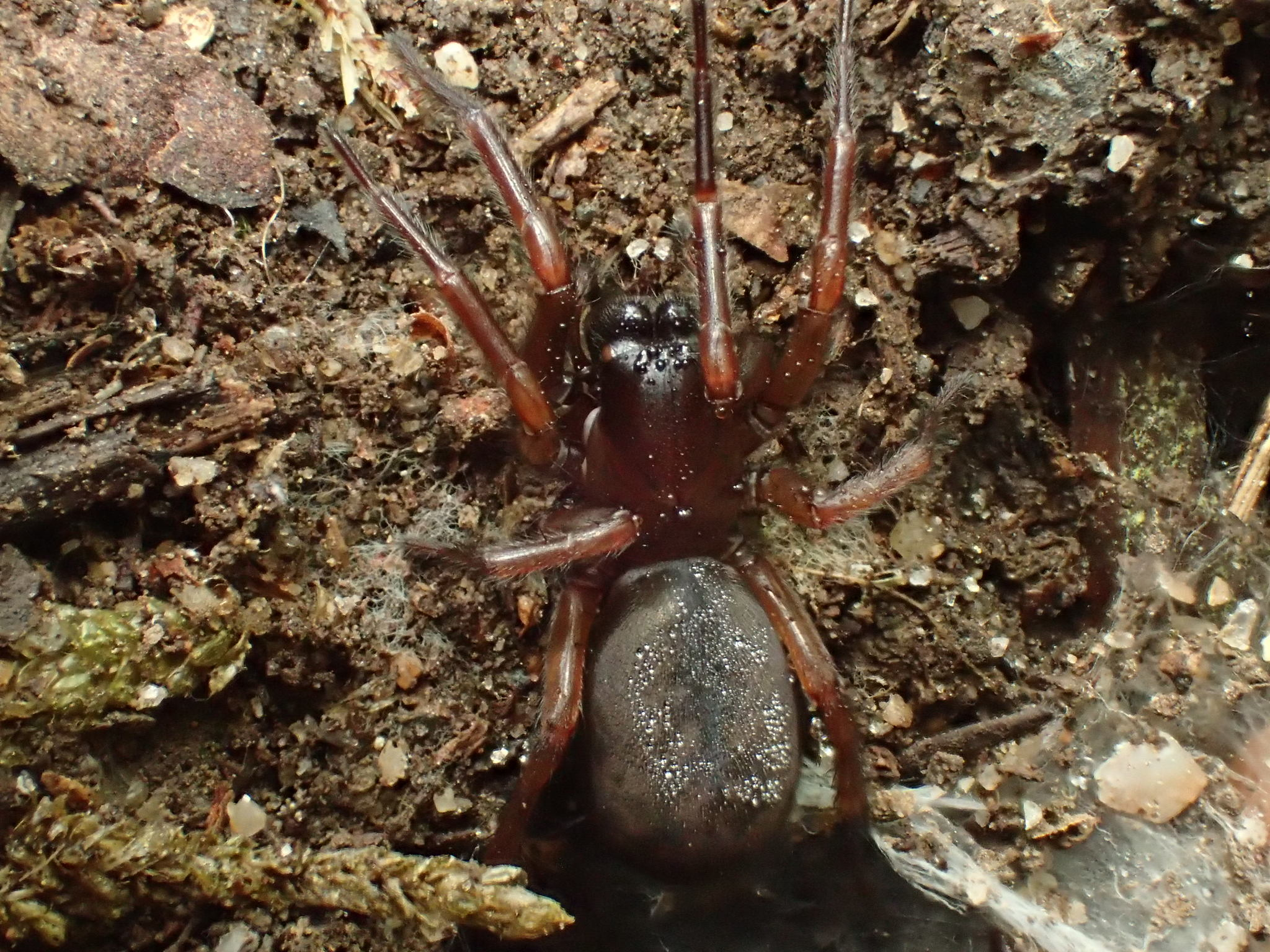
Female of Coelotes atropos

Coelotes terrestris resembles many other species in the genus Coelotes, such as Coelotes solitarius. The other representatives of the genus have a smaller distribution area or are generally rarer than Coelotes terrestris.

Coelotes terrestris shares the most similarities with Coelotes atropos, whose opisthosoma is usually lighter and less distinctly patterned. Additionally, in the male of Coelotes atropos, the apophysis on the patella is equipped with three short, rounded processes, while the epigyne of this species has an indistinct bulge anterolaterally.

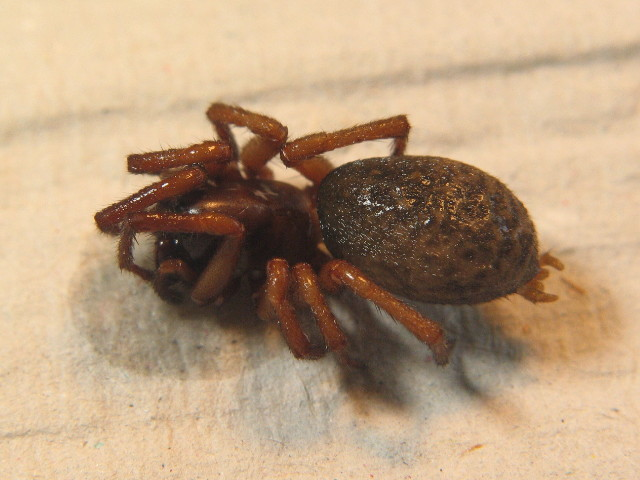
Prepared female of Inermocoelotes inermis

Furthermore, Coelotes terrestris can easily be confused with the very similar Inermocoelotes inermis, which can also be found together with Coelotes terrestris, albeit usually at lower individual density. Due to the strong similarities between the two species, Inermocoelotes inermis can only be reliably distinguished from Coelotes terrestris based on genital morphological features. The conductor of a single bulb in Inermocoelotes inermis is basally provided with a broad process, and the tip of each bulb runs transverse to the longitudinal axis of the cymbium (third and last sclerite, or hard part of the bulb). The pit of the female's epigyne in this species is twice as long as wide and has a more or less sinuous appearance.

== Distribution ==
Distribution map of Coelotes terrestris

Coelotes terrestris is present in Europe and Turkey. The distribution extends north to Denmark. In Central Europe, the species is widespread except for the Baltic states and Kaliningrad Oblast as well as Croatia, which also applies to Western Europe. There, Coelotes terrestris is recorded in the Benelux countries, mainland France, and Great Britain.

In Great Britain itself, the species is mainly present in southeastern England and replaces Coelotes atropos there. From other parts of Great Britain, there are only isolated records of Coelotes terrestris. Old records from Yorkshire and Berwickshire are likely based on confusions with Coelotes atropos, which, unlike Coelotes terrestris, mainly inhabits the west and north of Great Britain.

In Eastern Europe, Coelotes terrestris is only present in Ukraine and Belarus, while in Southeast Europe, it has been recorded so far in Romania, Bulgaria, and North Macedonia as well as mainland Greece and the European part of Turkey.

In Germany, the species particularly inhabits mountainous regions. Examples include the Franconian Jura, the Burgberg near Erlangen, and the area of the district Rathsberg near Erlangen.

=== Habitats ===
Coelotes terrestris preferably inhabits forests, that are not too dry. Among these, especially deciduous and coniferous forests with higher site quality are sought. The species most frequently inhabits mountainous forest areas on loamy soils. However, it also inhabits flat areas with sandy substrate, compensating for the moisture differences in both soil types by settling areas with high groundwater levels.

Coelotes terrestris requires, as typical for hemihygrophilous (moisture-loving) species, higher saturation of water vapor in the surrounding air, but compared to other life forms with the same preference, it has high resistance to relative humidity of 30% to 75%. Because of this, the spider can also inhabit dry areas with raw humus, as this has high water capacity and good insulation against heat too high for the spider.

Since humidity in the preferred habitats of Coelotes terrestris fluctuates greatly, the species is present there in island-like populations. In transition areas of preferred habitats, including dry sparse pine stands, the spider can also occur abundantly. This is due to the fact that it cannot spread into surrounding dry areas.

From forests, Coelotes terrestris also inhabits forest edges, coppices, as well as shrub and hedge landscapes. Occasionally, wood-poor open land habitats such as dry grasslands, fallow lands, ruderal sites, or heathlands are colonized by the species. In Great Britain, it has also been found on moss-covered water banks.

Females in typical habitats

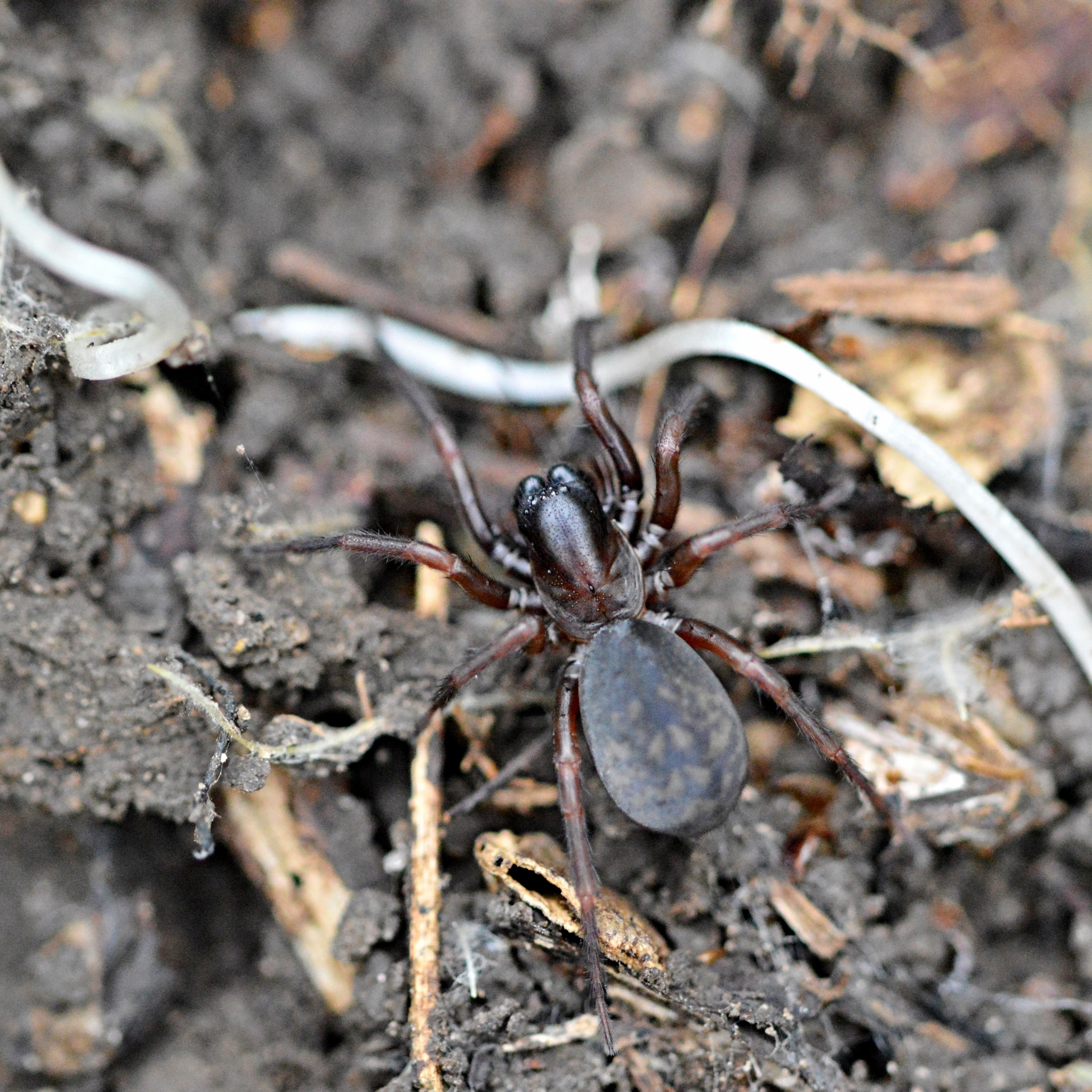
Ground

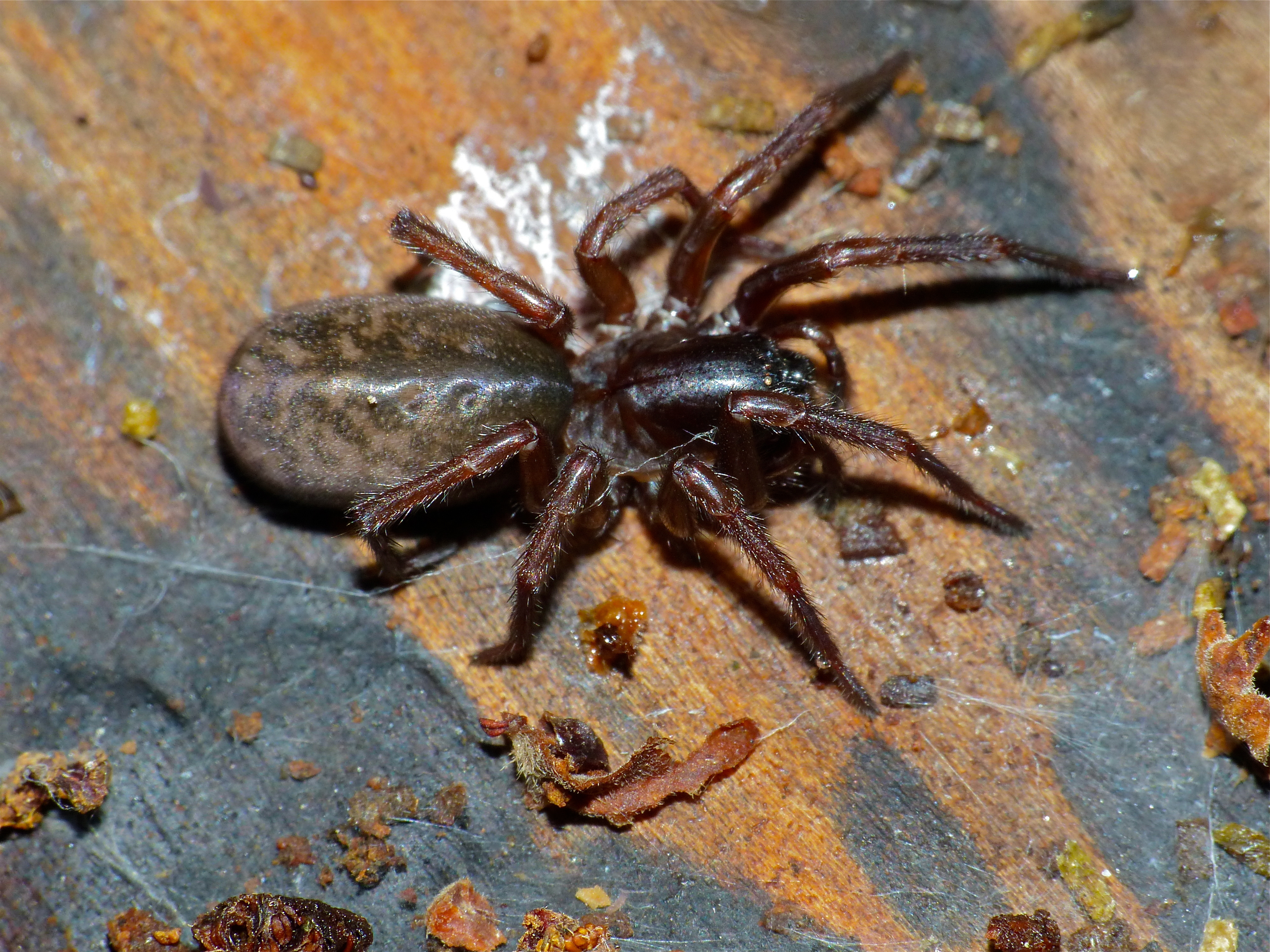
Woodland

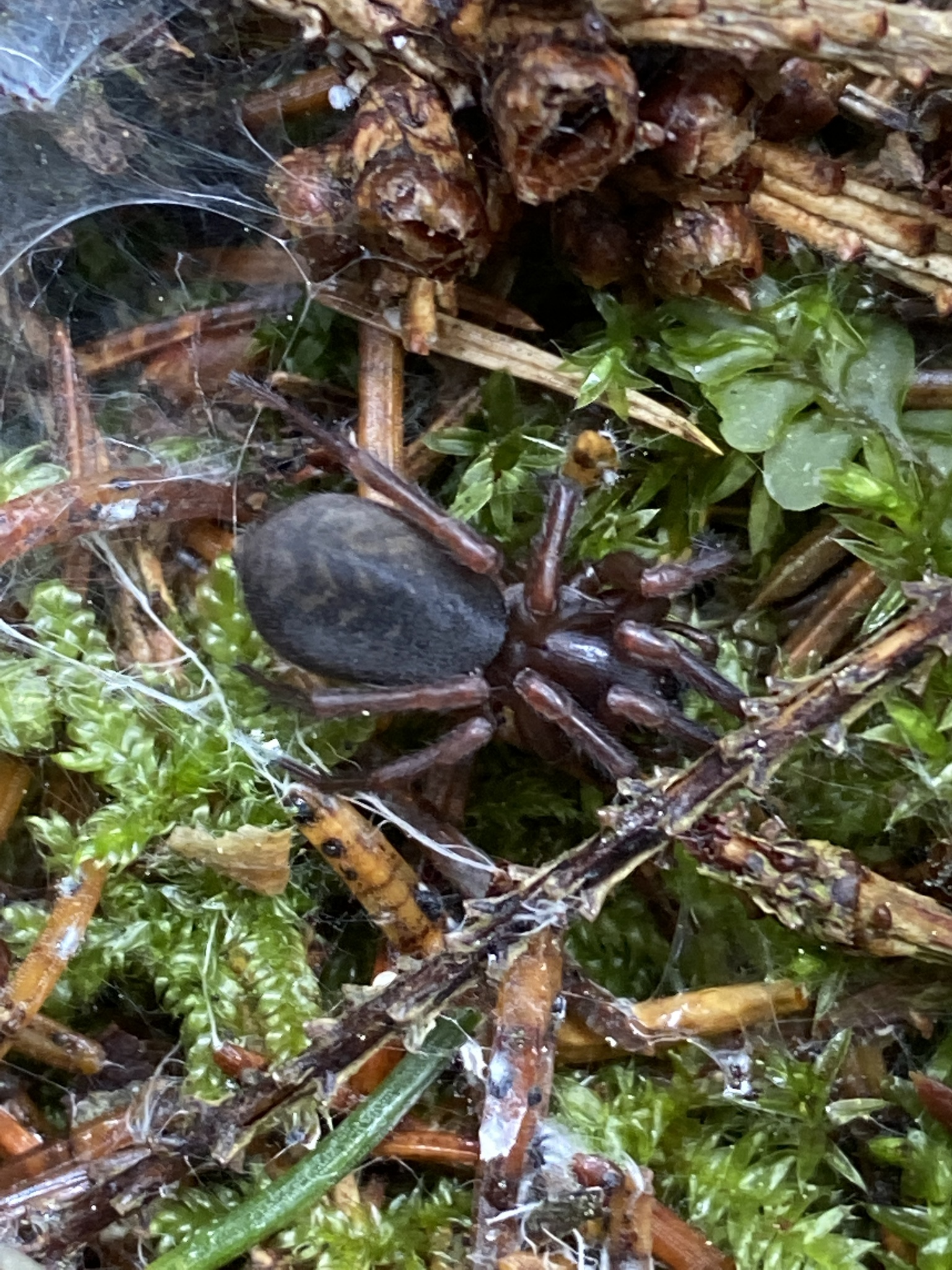
Moss layer

=== Conservation status ===
The conservation status of Coelotes terrestris varies by country. The species is generally considered very common in its range. In the Red List of Endangered Animals, Plants and Fungi of Germany, Coelotes terrestris is classified as "least concern", as it is also very common in Germany and populations are stable both long- and short-term.

Although much rarer there, Coelotes terrestris is listed in the Red List of Great Britain (1991) according to IUCN criteria in category LC ("Least Concern"). There, the species is considered widespread but rather local and never found in high density. Threats to Coelotes terrestris on the island include loss of natural forest areas through intensive forestry, loss of heathlands, and removal of fallen trunks and deadwood. In the Red List of spiders of Czech Republic (2015), Coelotes terrestris is listed in IUCN category ES ("Ecologically Sustainable").

== Biology ==
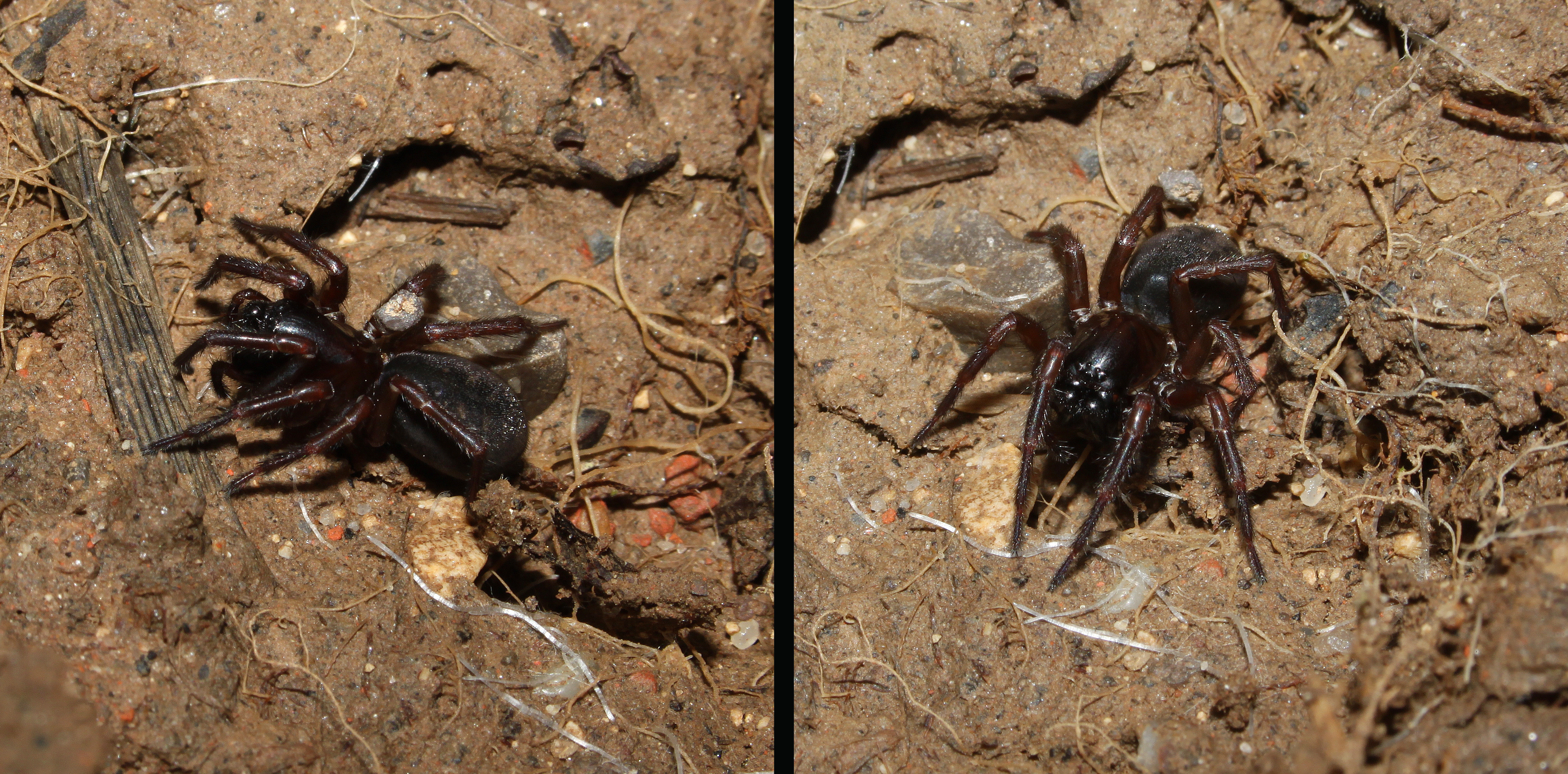
Various views of a female on the ground. Due to its terrestrial lifestyle, Coelotes terrestris prefers to stay on the ground.

The biology of Coelotes terrestris was described in detail by Erwin Tretzel in 1961. Like all species in Coelotes, the spider is terrestrial (ground-dwelling) and, like all Agelenidae, nocturnal. The hidden lifestyle typical of the family is also present in this species. On clay soils, the spider stays in ground cracks under flat-spreading roots of spruces (Picea) and in the litter layer. On sandy substrate, it is found when the raw humus and litter layer sock-like surrounds the base of trunks of pines (Pinus). It is also found under large stones. On sandy soils, Coelotes terrestris also inhabits tall-growing Hypnum, while avoiding peat mosses (Sphagnum).

The need for water is very low in the species and can also be obtained from moist raw humus if possible. For this, the spider bites into the humus. Intake of water droplets was only observed in captivity and then only sporadically during a longer simulated dry period.

=== Hunting behavior ===
Coelotes terrestris lives predatorily like all spiders and constructs a spider web for hunting purposes. Like all spiders with this hunting method, this species is also considered an ambush predator.

==== Web construction ====
The web of Coelotes terrestris is basically a funnel web typical and named for Agelenidae. Depending on the nature of the web site, it can be built very differently in this species. The spider works on its web only at night, corresponding to its activity period.

===== Web location =====
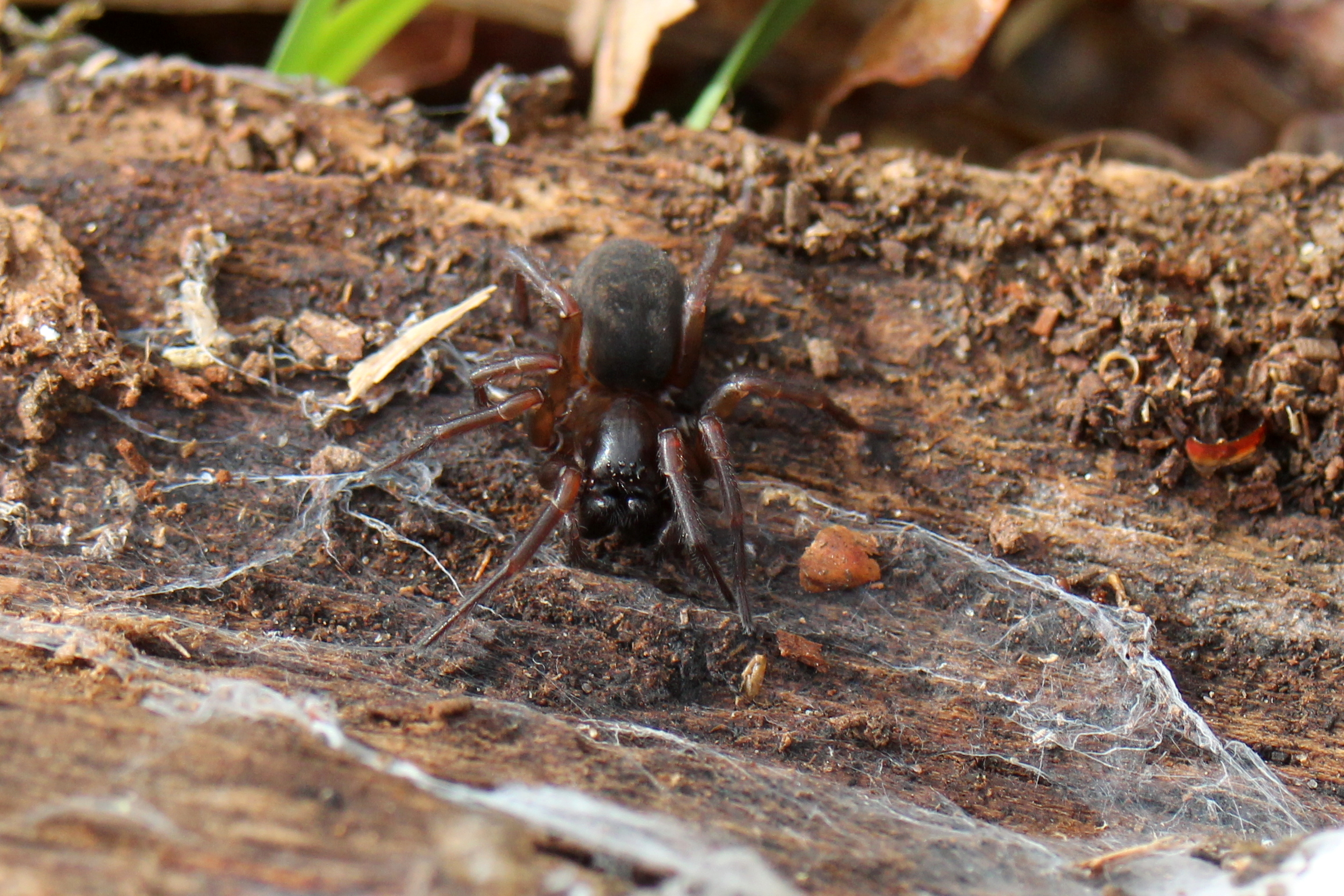
Female on its catching web at a tree stump, a common web site for Coelotes terrestris

A common web site for Coelotes terrestris are trunks of pines (Pinus), and on a single pine trunk, several inhabited webs of the spider can be present even with a relatively small diameter of the trunk. Individuals living on these trunks preferably place their webs between the bark and the surrounding raw humus or litter layer. Occasionally, the spider uses surfaces under stones or tree stumps as web sites.

To prevent flooding of the web when built at trunks by runoff water, Coelotes terrestris preferably places its web on the east side, but not the eastern half. Similarly, the species increasingly avoids the west and northwest sides of the trunks for the same reason. In addition, though less so, the north and south sides of the trunks are accepted, but intermediate directions are mostly avoided. This is probably because Coelotes terrestris prefers eastern orientations over western ones through polarization-optical optimization. If colonization of the east surface of a pine trunk is no longer possible due to an already too large population density of the spider, the individuals then maintain a safety distance from those on the east surface of about 90° from the base cross-section of the tree trunk, so the individuals then move to the east and south surface of the trunk.

===== Construction phase and web variation =====
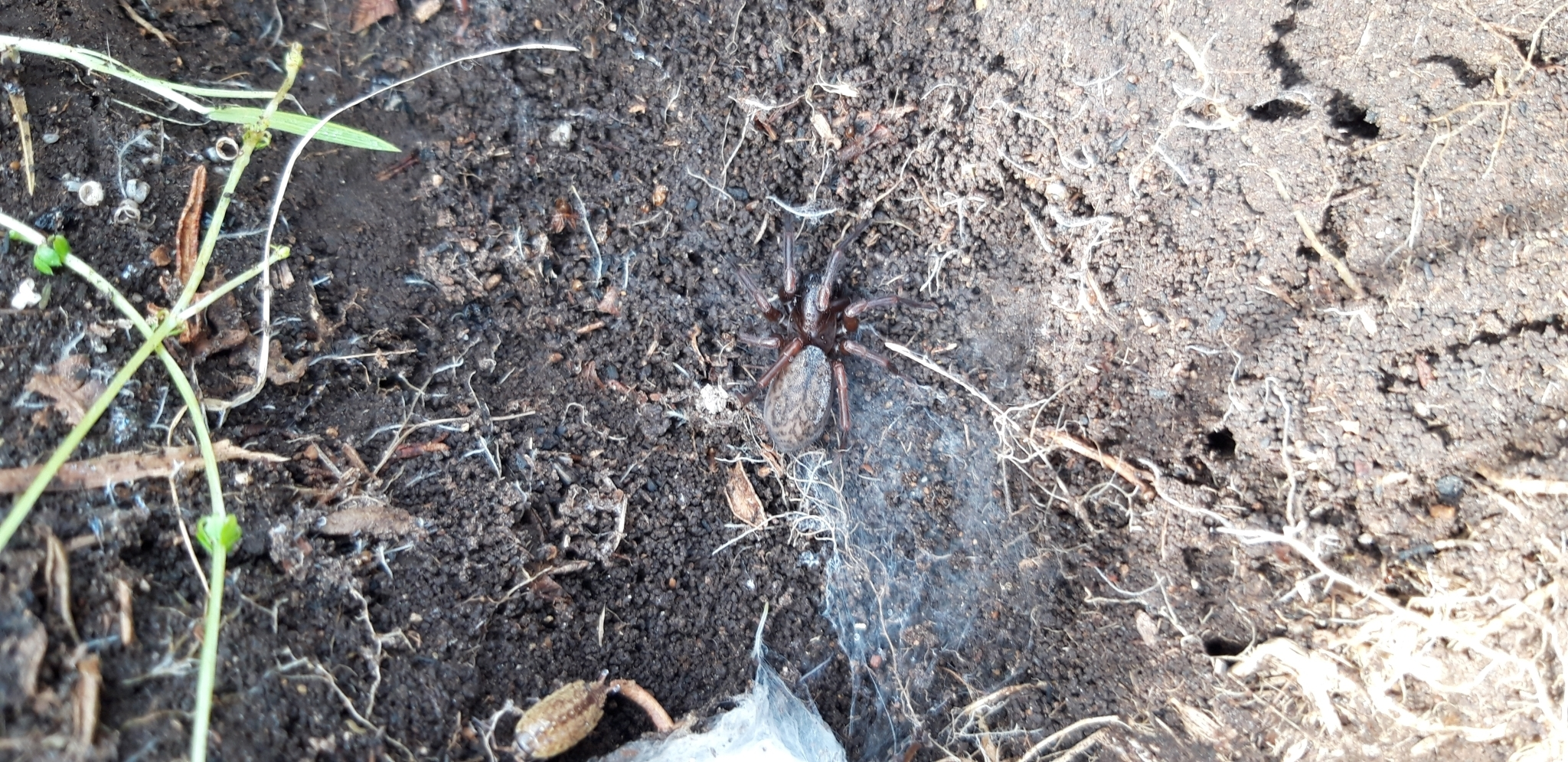
Web of a female on the ground from above. The retreat tube is visible at the bottom of the image.

Coelotes terrestris is able to adapt its web well to the spatial conditions of the respective web site, making its web highly variable. Constructing a web usually extends over several nights and begins with a large-scale projection of the web by laying a few thick silk threads for sketching the web to be built. Openings suitable for retreat and side tubes are already included in the design. Since the individual threads cannot be drawn in uniform curvature but only angled by intermediate attachment, the layout of a tube opening is initially more or less rectangular. Later, the openings take a round shape by laying new threads at the corner areas and thus bridging the existing ones. If necessary, Coelotes terrestris can later provide its finished fabric with additional openings by biting them into the fabric with the chelicerae and then widening them to the necessary width for passage with its legs. In contrast, unused openings are spanned and closed with a delicate web. These openings serve the spider for escape in case of disturbances and can be reopened with a strike of the front extremities.

For constructing the retreat tube used as a residence, Coelotes terrestris distributes spider silk in uninterrupted progression through a characteristic sideways and upward swinging of the opisthosoma. The web mat serving for prey capture is regularly renewed with new catching threads, laid in a new layer at a small distance over the previous one and sinking onto it over time. Overall, the inclination for web repair by Coelotes terrestris is rather low, so webs built in raw humus after digging activity are significantly reduced due to the spatial situation. In this case, the otherwise large mat is built as a round funnel and spread over the ground or spun obliquely to tree trunks. In a web of this construction, the 7 to 10 cm long and rarely branched retreat tube attaches to the opening, ending in a blind chamber deep in the ground area. In this chamber, the spider stays when not performing activities. The retreat tube has a conical expansion between the living chamber and the tube entrance, on whose web wall the remains of consumed prey are deposited. Unlike retreat tubes of webs running in humus, those in the moss layer are often more branched.

If Coelotes terrestris builds its web under stones or in tree stumps, it is much larger and more complex. It then has a ground mat, parallel or oblique to which runs another large, fine-meshed mat serving for capture. The latter mat transitions on one side into the U-shaped curved retreat tube open on both sides, both mouths of which bind to the catching mat. In this case, the center of the tube is expanded to the living chamber, and consumption of prey and its storage for later feeding as well as the initial stay of the juveniles take place there. However, the latter stay in a coarse-meshed filling web around the living chamber, which is additionally spun over after egg laying. For storing prey remains in webs of this type, either a lateral expansion of the retreat tube or a lateral niche of the living chamber serves.

==== Prey capture and spectrum ====
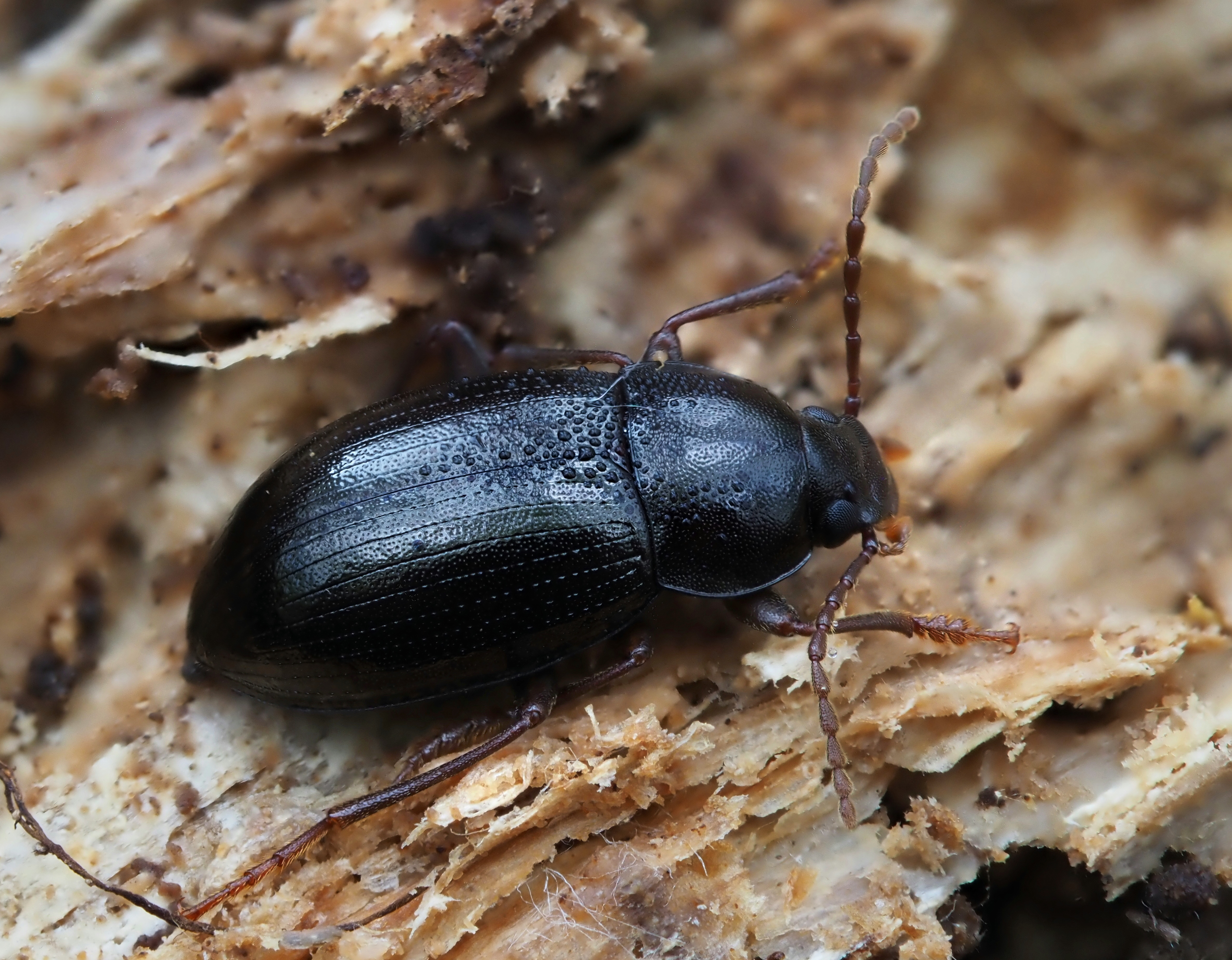
Darkling beetles (Tenebrionidae) like Nalassus laevioctostriatus are among the more common prey of Coelotes terrestris.

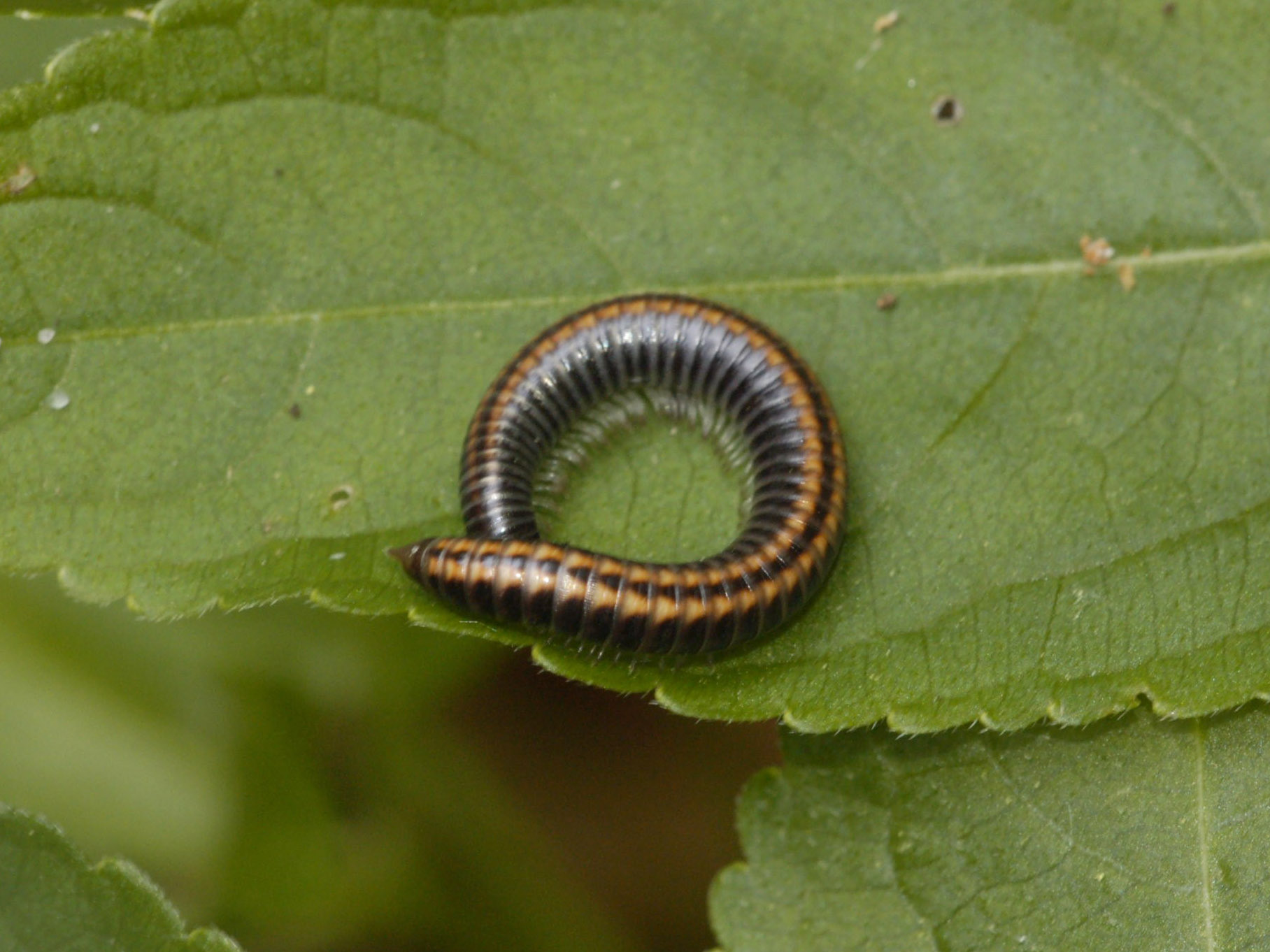
The millipede Ommatoiulus sabulosus is safe from the spider due to its defense secretion.

Coelotes terrestris is an opportunistic hunter without a specialized prey spectrum but, corresponding to the preferred web site, mainly captures beetles and especially their larvae living near pine trunks. Depending on the location, individuals of Coelotes terrestris mainly prey on darkling beetles (Tenebrionidae) or ground beetles (Carabidae), with individuals living in pine trunks preferring beetles of the former family and those in moss layers mostly beetles of the latter family. Furthermore, among beetles, soldier beetles (Cantharidae), ladybugs (Coccinellidae), and rove beetles (Staphylinidae) are common prey of Coelotes terrestris. Other insects in the prey spectrum include earwigs (Dermaptera), dipterans (Diptera), bees (Apidae), and ichneumon wasps (Ichneumonidae) as well as hairy caterpillars and butterfly pupae. Avoided by the species are millipedes (Diplopoda), smaller vertebrates, and usually also slugs.

As typical for Agelenidae, Coelotes terrestris waits until a prey animal touches the web mat. During the day, it hides in its retreat tube and at night preferably at the tube mouth. When a prey is detected on the web, it rushes out quickly and immediately goes to the prey, which the spider locates by the reaction transmitted by it to the mat or surrounding threads of the web. The sense of location of Coelotes terrestris is extremely well developed and allows it to take the shortest path to the located prey. /> A venom bite administered with the chelicerae kills the prey before it is carried by the spider into the retreat tube and consumed there.

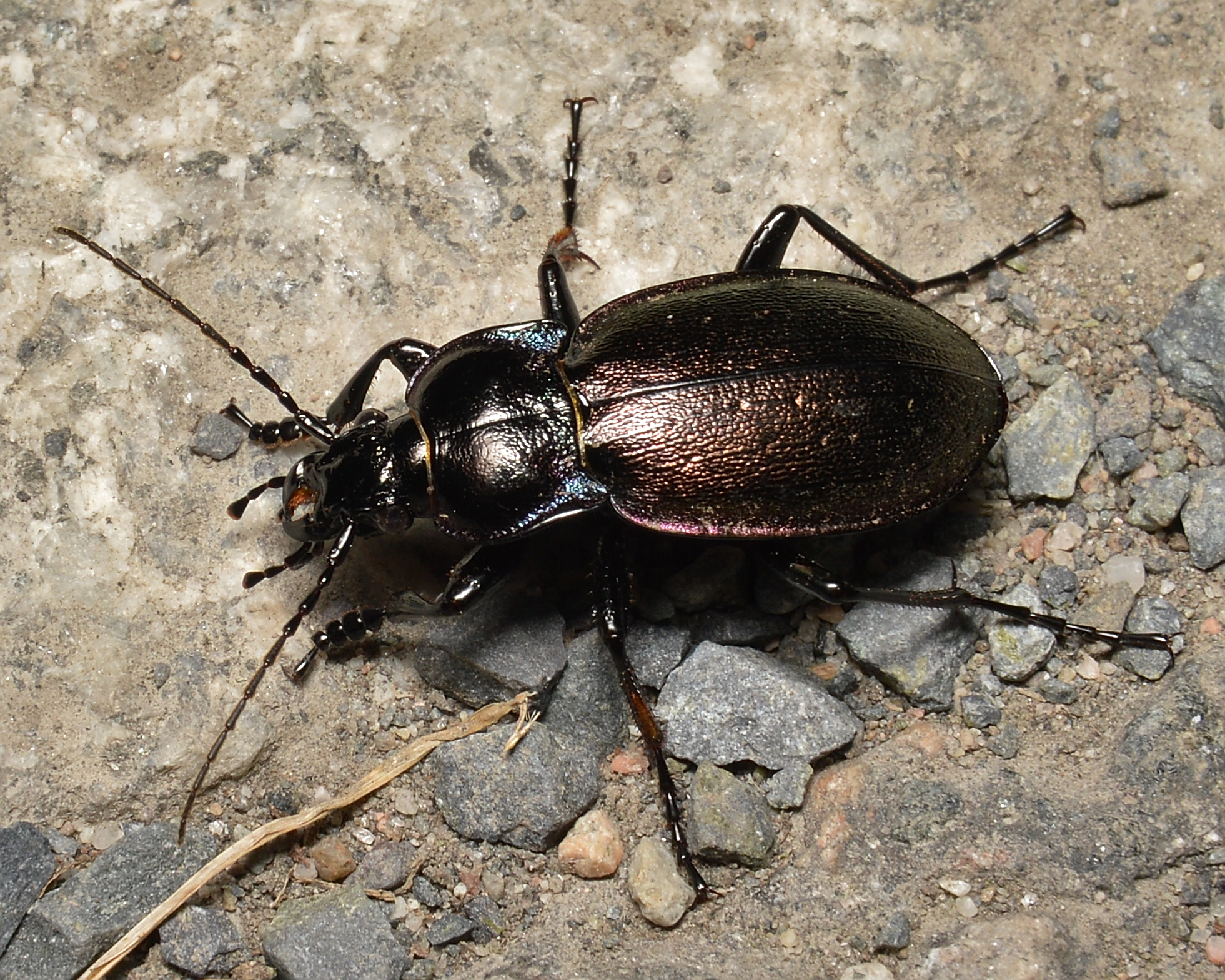
Quite large and defensive ground beetles (Carabidae) like the forest ground beetle (Carabus nemoralis) are thrown onto their backs by the spider.

Coelotes terrestris additionally applies different methods to subdue prey depending on the prey animal. Heavily armored beetles are thrown onto their backs by the spider so that it can penetrate the intersegmental membrane (very thin and little sclerotinized area of the exoskeleton) of the sternum in the area of the abdomen with its chelicerae. Darkling beetles are rotated around their longitudinal axis by the spider, and ground beetles are thrown backward. This approach of the spider is based on the mobility and agility of the respective beetles. Through the paralyses caused by the spider's venom bites at the intersegmental membrane of a beetle, it opens its elytra (wing covers) and grants the spider dorsal access to it as well. Coelotes terrestris often separates the abdomen and thorax (chest) in beetles by strong bites and then processes the chest piece separately after inserting a chelicera.

===== Behavior towards prey and intruders in the web =====
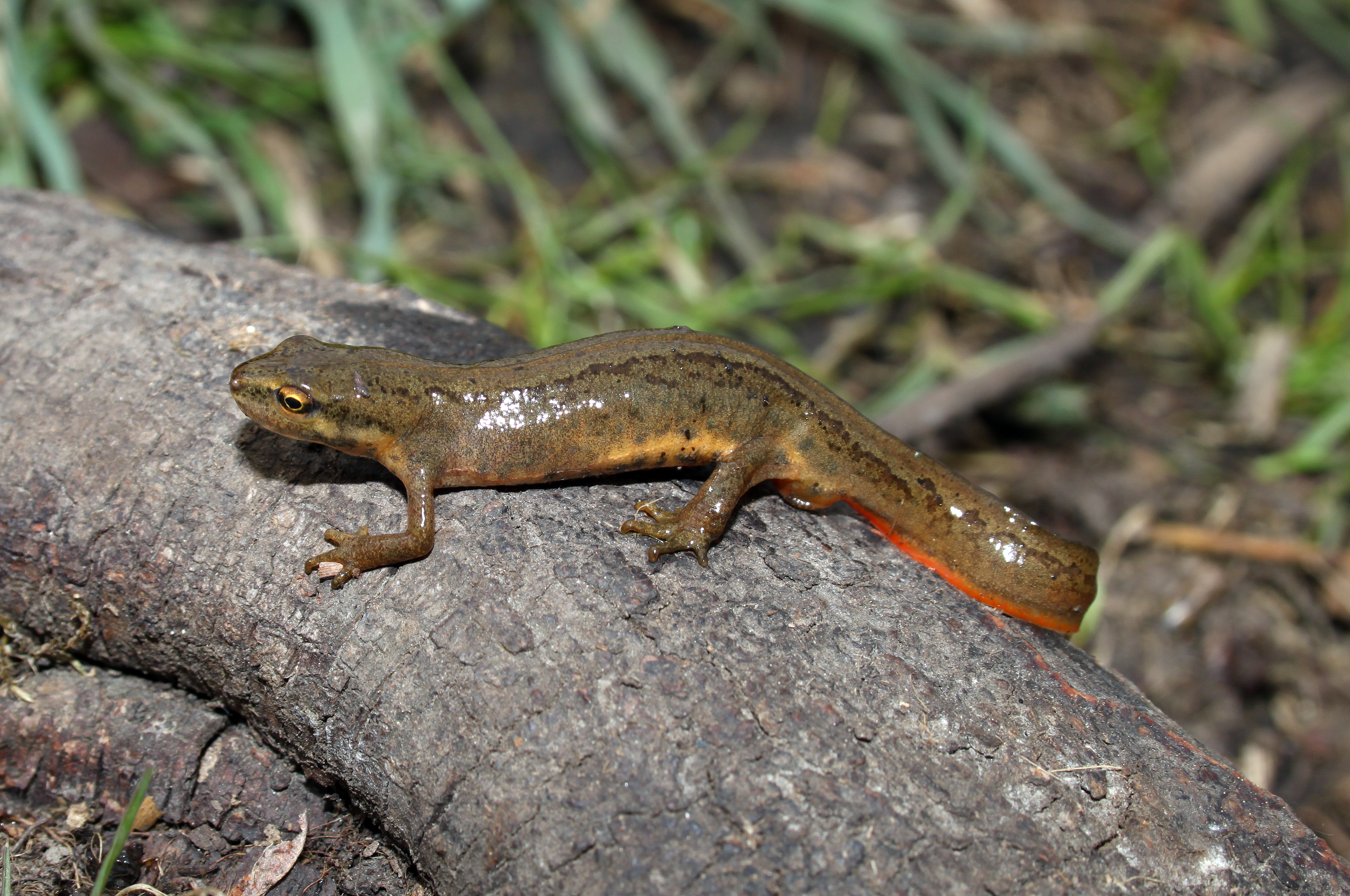
The smooth newt (Lissotriton vulgaris) is driven from the web by threat bites, for example.

Coelotes terrestris treats prey and web intruders differently, often with different bites. While for prey, orienting bites precede the actual paralyzing bite, the species applies threat bites to unwanted animals in the web, including slugs and newts. In these, the spider stabs the intruder with the tips of the spread chelicerae under springy movements of the erect prosoma.

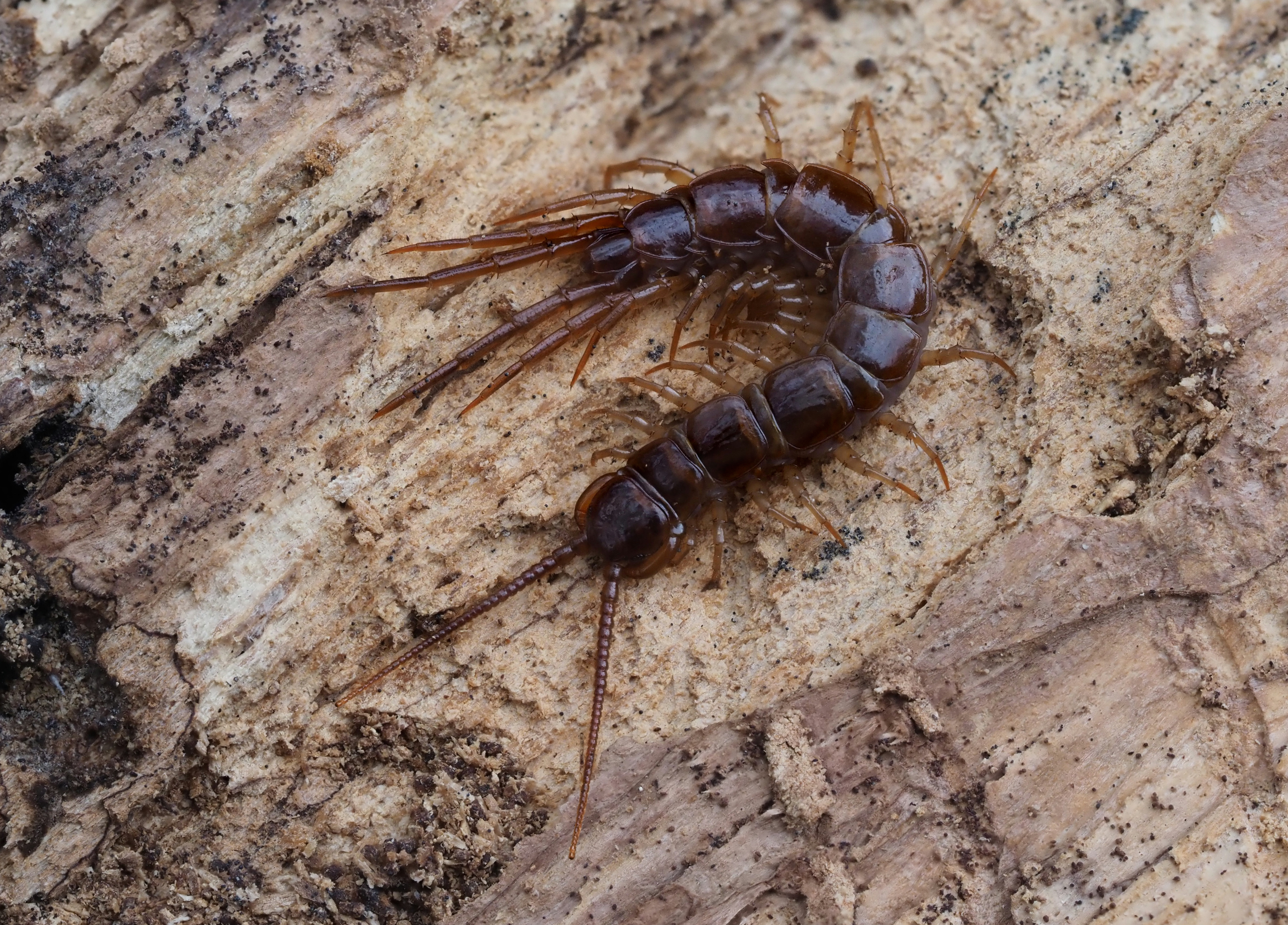
Some animals, such as the brown centipede (Lithobius forficatus), try to escape the spider's web unobtrusively if they enter it.

Notable is the behavior of Coelotes terrestris towards centipedes (Chilopoda) and other spiders that enter the web, receiving treatment varying by taxon. Centipedes and not a few foreign spiders in the web try to sneak out unobtrusively. This behavior is particularly pronounced in the sac spider Clubiona reclusa. If an individual of this species touches the web of a specimen of Coelotes terrestris, the sac spider immediately slows all movements and tries to sneak out of the web unnoticed by taking the shortest path out with cautiously placed steps through its tasting moving extremities. This behavior of the sac spider is probably triggered by registering a web of Coelotes terrestris through the sense of touch. If escape from the web is not possible or the sac spider is guided to the tube opening of the web of Coelotes terrestris by external influences, the latter either performs a feint attack against the sac spider or jerky movements on its own web. These reactions of Coelotes terrestris are triggered by subthreshold vibration stimuli.

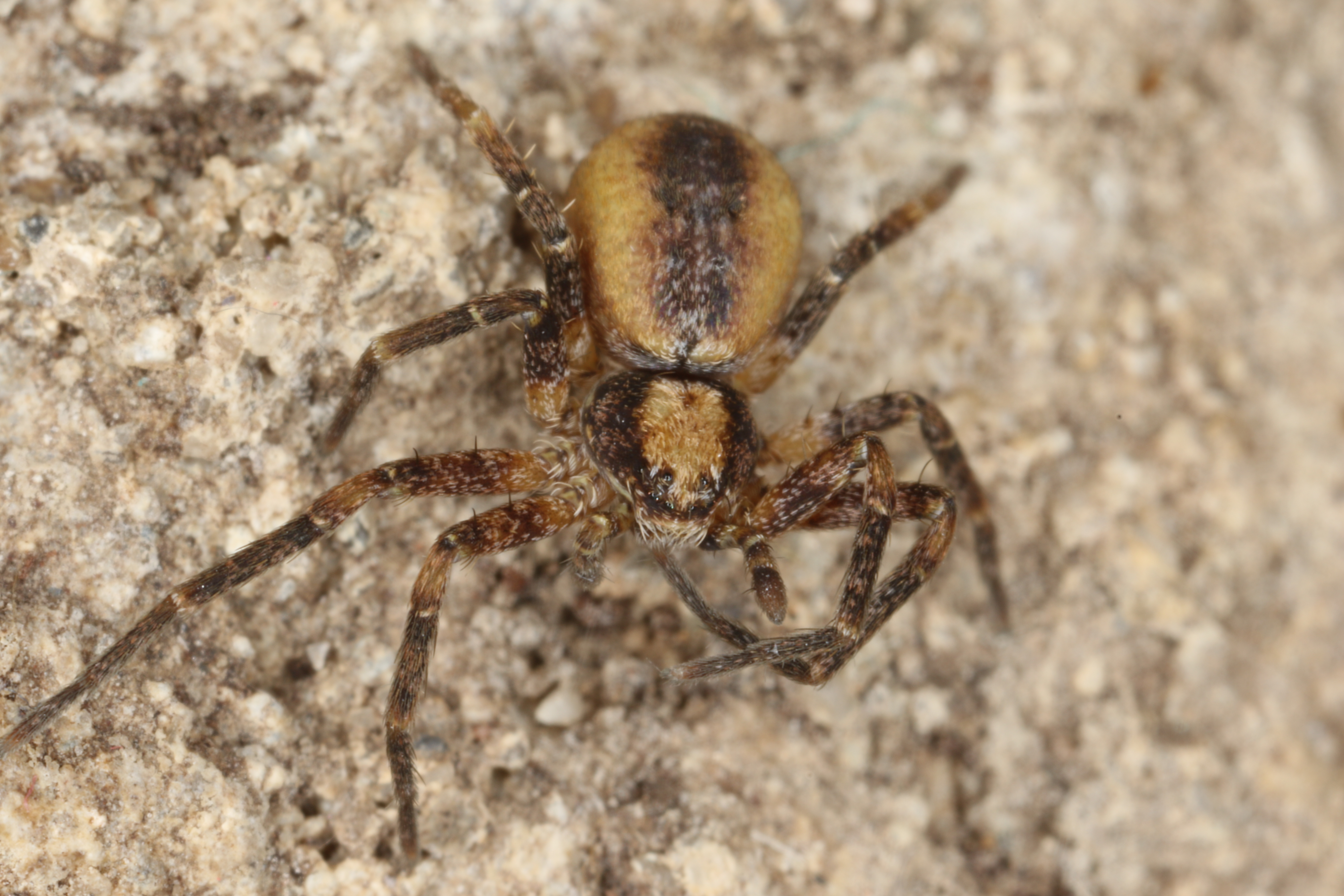
Some other spiders, including crab spiders (Philodromus), try to leave the web of Coelotes terrestris in flight if on it.

Often, it could be shown that a female of Coelotes terrestris prefers to retreat into the retreat tube of its web in such an encounter. Whether this is orientation problems or actually a species-specific defense behavior triggered by perceiving certain vibrations by the spider towards web intruders is unclear. Aggressive defense behavior of Coelotes terrestris towards other spiders could only be shown in captivity and only when the respective foreign spider was guided to Coelotes terrestris by external interventions. Specimens of the sac spider were in that case thrown onto their backs similarly to beetles by individuals of Coelotes terrestris and then bitten in the sternum. In other spiders, including ground sac spiders (Agroeca), crab spiders (Philodromus), and sheet weavers (Stemonyphantes), avoidance behavior is also noticeable if they enter a web of Coelotes terrestris. These spiders then remain motionless for several minutes, either sitting or lying in the web, and suddenly rise if they no longer perceive vibrations caused by the web owner, then leaving the web abruptly. If the foreign spiders collide with Coelotes terrestris during the escape attempt, they stand motionless again and are briefly touched by it. Afterward, they are not further treated by Coelotes terrestris, so the foreign spiders can leave the web. In contrast, this avoidance behavior remains unsuccessful in some beetles, including ladybugs (Coccinellidae), so they are captured by the spider even in motionless state if in its web.

===== Theory on optimization of injected venom quantity =====
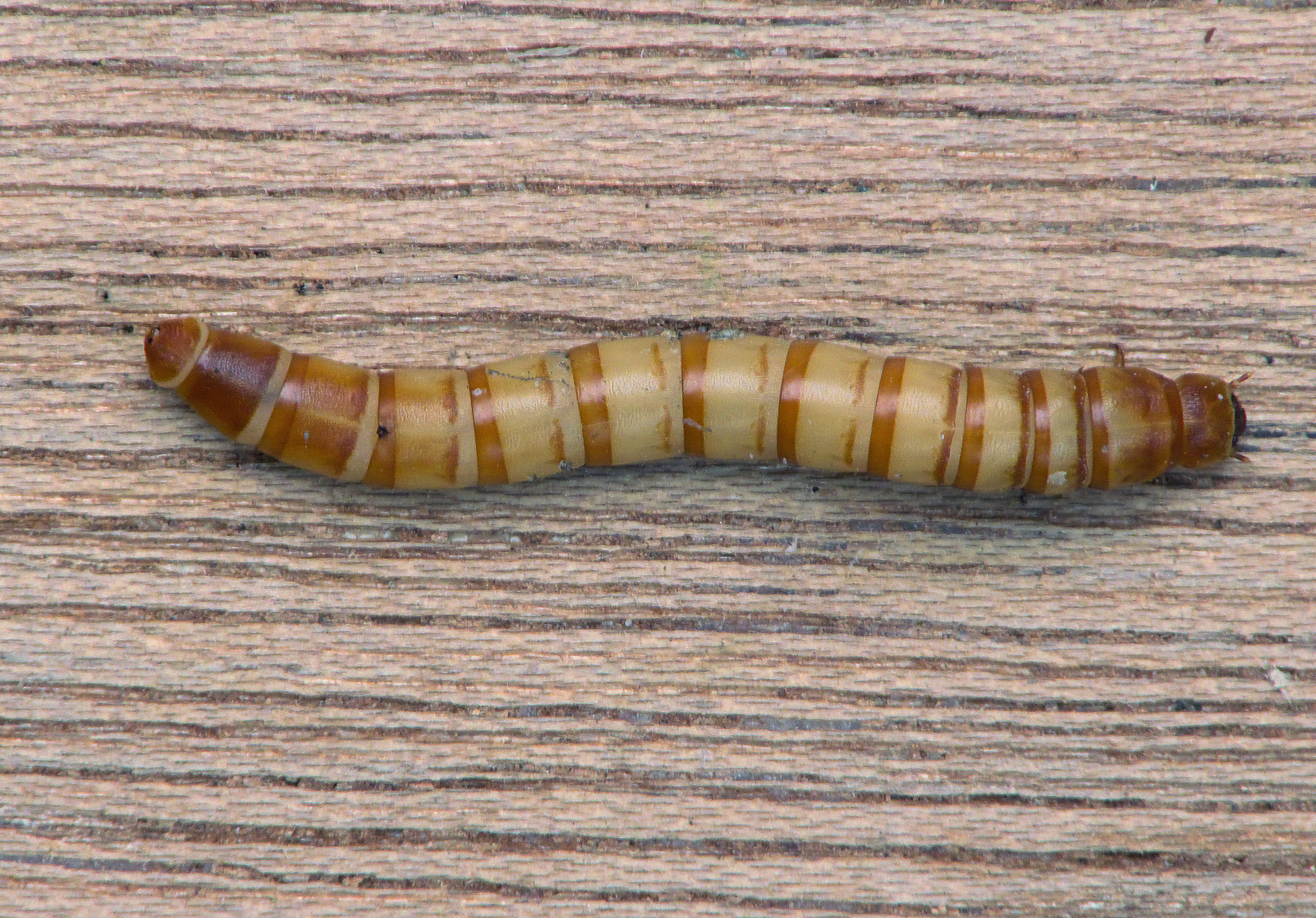
In less defensive prey like mealworms, Coelotes terrestris apparently injects smaller amounts of venom into them.

As in other spiders, such as the unrelated and mainly Central American large wandering spider (Cupiennius salei) in the family Trechaleidae, it could also be observed in Coelotes terrestris that it apparently can adjust the amount of venom to be administered depending on the prey's properties. While in specimens of the brown centipede (Lithobius forficatus) held by the spider with its chelicerae, the grip is loosened after five minutes, this happens in mealworms only after 10 to 20 minutes. From this, it can be derived that the venom administered by the spider achieves a faster effect in more defensive animals than in defenseless ones, and the spider thus injects larger amounts of venom in those more dangerous to it.

Particularly in the behavior of the spider towards the brown centipede, this can be well demonstrated. After the first paralyzing bite by the spider on a centipede, up to two follow-up bites each lasting three to five minutes follow. Then the spider begins to clean itself and places a leg on the centipede, presumably to check for further signs of life. If the centipede is on its back, its legs can still move in idle, but do not animate the spider to further intervention. If the centipede is artificially moved in this case, the spider proves ready to grip again immediately. However, the spider does not always bite but apparently positions itself examining over the centipede.

===== Cleaning of the chelicerae after killing prey =====
Coelotes terrestris occasionally cleans its chelicerae after killing a prey animal. For this, the spider bites into the surrounding ground or less often into its web and thus apparently cleans the chelicerae of components unusable for the spider from the respective prey object. If the spider cleans its chelicerae by bites into the ground, it first leaves the retreat tube through a lateral opening. Then the bites are performed short and repeatedly at different places on the ground one after another before the spider re-enters its web and cleans other body areas. This behavior does not occur with surrounding sand as ground.

In the case of cleaning the chelicerae using its own spider web, the spider first goes to the lateral web areas or to the upper half of the tube wall before biting there. In this case, the spider also cleans the teeth on the furrow edges of the chelicerae by stripping foreign components on them after unfolding the claws with reinforced forward and sideways rubbing movements.

Coelotes terrestris performs this cleaning method often both after consuming prey with defense secretions and after beetles, which often must be handled elaborately and with several bite attempts. This suggests that this cleaning of the chelicerae serves not only to remove prey remains but also to free excess venom that accumulates in the furrow areas of the claws through the increased bite attempts. In general, this cleaning occurs very irregularly and also in various prey in arbitrary frequency.

=== Life cycle and phenology ===
The life cycle of Coelotes terrestris is significantly influenced by the seasons, as in other spiders occurring in temperate climates. The phenology (activity period) for adult individuals of both sexes is mostly the whole year. Only males are absent in January.

==== Reproductive behavior ====
The mating season of Coelotes terrestris extends from spring to midsummer. The reproductive behavior consists, as in many other spiders, of complex mating behavior preceded by equally elaborate courtship behavior.

===== Courtship and approach =====
The courtship of Coelotes terrestris is very varied and extended. Both sex partners approach each other alternately. Notably, the female stimulates the male and, unlike in other spiders, does not remain passive.

A mating-willing male, once arrived at the web of a sexually mature female, will pursue it, while the female initially behaves rather rejectingly towards the male. It first allows itself to be briefly touched by the male but then withdraws. The male then remains in the web and stops pursuing the female, instead devoting itself to its own body cleaning. After some time, the female then approaches the male. If the male does not make approach attempts to the female, it is touched by the female and sometimes stroked with its extremities. The male then also reacts with active stroking of the female with its front legs, whereupon the female withdraws again and the male stops its activity once more. If the male remains inactive, the female approaches it. However, if the male continues the pursuit, the female turns away. In the latter case, this procedure is continued until the mating readiness of both sex partners has increased such that either the female initiates mating with the male or directly prompts it by charging frontally at its sex partner.

In addition to the explained courtship movements, it can also occur that male and female perform tripping-like movements in a circular rotation, rapid drumming with the front legs on the web, or stroking over it. Additionally, it is proven that the male of Coelotes terrestris drums on the female's web with its pedipalps and additionally performs twitching or vibrating movements with its opisthosoma.

The courting male of Coelotes terrestris behaves little cautiously compared to those of other spider species. Only in rare cases could a feint attack by the female on the male be shown, which the latter dodged. Tretzel could uniquely show in his captivity investigations that a male killed a female in a feint attack in its web. The allegedly typical grasping of the patellae and tibiae of the female by the male for funnel-web spiders (Agelena) could be shown three times by the same author, including in hanging position. Tretzel theorized that this behavior is ritual behavior or, due to the rather irregular movements of the males in that case, atavism, as the male tugs at the female's extremities and thus gives the impression of positioning the female in a cataleptic-like state into a favorable position for mating, but ultimately does not expend the necessary effort for this action.

===== Copulation and sperm uptake =====
Two different mating positions have been shown so far for Coelotes terrestris. In the first, also pronounced in many spiders of the superfamily Lycosoidea and generally known as position III, the male mounts the female's back frontally, so both sex partners now look in opposite directions. Both bulbs are inserted once each for an hour into the female's epigyne. The haematodocha (elastic joint membrane on the bulb) of the respective bulb swells irregularly during insertion. Insertion can begin with either the left or right bulb. For insertion of the bulbs, the male first positions its body obliquely on one side to the female's body axis and bends its prosoma down beside the partner's opisthosoma to reach the female's vulva with its laterally stretched pedipalp. The same is repeated on the other side. The interruption can be short or long. In the latter case, a separation of the pair occurs first before insertion with the other bulb, and again a long extended courtship behavior.

In addition to the mating position, the location of mating on the female's web can also vary. Locations for mating can be horizontal web surfaces, the interior of the retreat tube, or the web mat. The second mating position besides the explained and horizontally laid position III is the vertical position. In this, the female is oriented with the head side either up or down. The male is almost ventrally facing it or nearly right-angled to the female's body longitudinal axis. Overall, matings of Coelotes terrestris can proceed very differently, and both sex partners can change orientation during it.

Little is known about sperm uptake in Coelotes terrestris. Tretzel could observe once that in a pair held in captivity for observation purposes, a male bit a hole in the female's web about two and a half hours after completed copulation in the afternoon. Then the male sat next to the recently created hole and let a cloudy white sperm drop emerge. However, the animal was scared by an attempt to photograph the event and fled. In other males observed and paired in captivity by Tretzel, the author could not detect such behavior. The so-called mating plug on the female's epigyne after mating is hardly recognizable in Coelotes terrestris. The male dies in the course of autumn after mating.

==== Egg laying and structure and storage of egg cocoons ====
On average 57 days after mating, the female produces the first egg cocoon, after about 16 days a second. The cocoons are produced at night. The first cocoon contains around 80 eggs. The maximum number of eggs in this cocoon is 114. The number of eggs in the second is unknown. The base plate of an egg cocoon of the species is flat, its cover web more or less vaulted. Its color is white.

In captivity, it could be observed that the female deposits its egg cocoons outside the retreat tube of its web, but directly next to the living area of it. The preferred storage location of the egg cocoon by the spider is a boundary surface at the filling web of the web at an oblique to steep web ceiling or occasionally on the overlying web mat. Subsequently, the spider creates the so-called nursery by over-spinning the fabric carrying the cocoon, in the form of an incomplete space traversed by filling web, located between the cocoon-carrying web fabric and the retreat tube. Both cocoons are directly next to each other.

The cocoons are hardly guarded by the female, but camouflaged with humus, though irregularly and gappy. For this, it transports individual humus particles over several hours and lays or presses them onto the cover web of the cocoon. If these particles are removed by external influences, the cocoon is left uncamouflaged.

==== Hatching of the juveniles ====
Hatching of the juveniles occurs at room temperature 24 days after production of the respective egg cocoon. This happens independently by the juveniles without help from the mother. The hatching, which usually occurs at night, extends over several and maximum six hours. On the morning of the following day, the juvenile spiders are more or less crowded in the nursery, while the now empty cocoon remains in place. Hatching takes place in July.

==== Brood care ====
A notable feature of Coelotes terrestris is its pronounced parental care, which is rare in spiders. The freshly hatched juveniles initially remain with the mother and are fed mouth-to-mouth by her before becoming independent. Therefore, the brood care of Coelotes terrestris is classified as food provision.

The juveniles remain 34 days in the mother's web after hatching. During this time, they undergo three molts at intervals of five, six, and 19 to 22 days. The mother remains alive 33 to 81 days after hatching of the juveniles.

===== Identification of the juveniles by the mother =====
The brood care behavior typical for Coelotes terrestris would also be given from a phylogenetic perspective only if a mother of the species can distinguish the vibrations in its own web caused by its offspring from those caused by other life forms, including prey and predators. However, it is not fully clarified how this differentiation exactly works. Even foreign spiders the size of the juveniles can be recognized and killed by a mother of Coelotes terrestris in its own web. Therefore, the theory that the juveniles do not bypass the intensity required to trigger the mother's hunting instinct proved false. Nevertheless, atypical movements of juveniles trigger a suspicious-seeming behavior in the mother, which then rushes jump-like to the juvenile and positions itself over it. The mother then blocks the juvenile's retreat with its front legs and touches its opisthosoma with its pedipalps for a second. Then the juvenile simply walks away or the mother abruptly turns away from the juvenile. This control behavior is likely a ritualized capture action where an active grip, as usual for prey, does not occur. The proof of the juveniles is not predetermined but varies depending on the situation and the mother's excitation level. While smell and touch sense apparently contribute no part to the recognition of the juveniles by the mother, certain movements of the juveniles, including leg movements or body trembling, seem to serve identification. Basically, a mother of Coelotes terrestris seems to recognize its offspring as such by their behavior.

===== Provision and feeding of the juveniles =====
A mother of Coelotes terrestris usually leaves already subdued and salivated prey animals. For provisioning its juveniles, the mother kills prey objects faster than usual and reduces its food intake. The juveniles show begging-like behavior towards the mother when needing food, which becomes evident when the mother holds a smaller prey freely between the chelicerae. For this, the juveniles stroke either with the first leg pair or with the pedipalps any body part of the mother, preferably however its chelicerae, pedipalps, or legs. The mother then releases the grip on the prey. A single juvenile then takes possession of the prey animal by positioning itself with the prosoma over it and turning the opisthosoma to the mother. To hide it from its siblings, the juvenile transports the prey object to a hidden area in the mother's web. Especially older juveniles often no longer wait until the mother drops a prey object but climb the mother with stroking movements and grasp the prey with their mouthparts. The mother opens its chelicerae and otherwise remains rigid and pays no further attention to its offspring. If a prey object is not sufficiently paralyzed by the mother, the juveniles refuse food intake.

The delivery of larger prey seems based on this mechanism, with the mother leaving the prey animal lying on the floor of the retreat tube. The juveniles' begging behavior seems derived from touching movements with the first leg pair and smelling movements using the pedipalps. From a phylogenetic perspective, the delivery of prey animals is likely a partial action or preparation for an attack by the mother, which it would apply to a streaming juvenile, for which it would have to free its chelicerae from the prey held by it.

For larger prey animals, such as larvae or beetles, the juveniles prefer especially the dry areas of the intersegmental membrane as well as wound areas where internal components emerge. At these, the juveniles are often clustered in bunches close together. The juveniles react to the movement of their siblings upon noticing with vigorous kicks of the rear legs, as displacement attempts of the juveniles among each other are only to be expected from behind. The juveniles can distinguish the movements of their siblings from others based on their touching manner. Tretzel could observe in a mother after food intake that it provides its offspring with regurgitated liquid food.

The juveniles prefer pre-digested and thus already salivated food from the mother over fresh and are attracted by scents over distances of under 15 millimeters. Over larger distances in the web, a mother alerts its offspring to tactile lure signals in the form of movements and vibrations on the web, which thus have a triggering function. These movements vary greatly among themselves and follow no fixed pattern. Their only commonality is their rather weak and soft intensity. Ordered by the expression of the respective lure effect, such a lure function comes to the cleaning movements, the walking movements when over-spinning the deposited prey animals, and the rhythmic oscillations when salivating and sucking them out. However, the temporal occurrence is reversed. Therefore, it is unclear whether the gradual differences in the stimulus effect are actually based on their expressions or merely on an overall effect through repetition of basically different stimuli, all having the identical function. A behavior specific to the juveniles by a mother towards the juveniles could not be shown in Coelotes terrestris, and the mother continues prey capture as usual. The movements of the mother take on the function of lure signals only upon gained recognition and registration by the juveniles. Rarely, mothers of Coelotes terrestris show knocking or plucking movements with the extremities, apparently triggered by tactile movements of the juveniles themselves. These occurrences happen when a mother is with recently caught and smaller prey animals before already fed juveniles and act strikingly strongly as lure means on the juveniles.

In addition, the mother can also protect juveniles with a web thrust from being involved in subduing prey. This action consists of a short and violent web movement, which the mother usually performs by stamping placement of a leg of the fourth leg pair or rarely by striking the opisthosoma, whereupon the offspring go into the retreat tube. This warning signal is likely to be seen as an intention movement of the mother, in which it makes location of the prey difficult for them. Since location through vibrations in the web is innate in Coelotes terrestris, the juveniles gather through mutual attraction, which in turn is triggered by their own movement.

===== Mutual behavior of the juveniles =====
The juveniles of Coelotes terrestris show no mutual killing during food intake in the retreat tube of the mother's web. It is different with prolonged food scarcity, disturbances in the web, and environmental changes. The number of juveniles in the mother's web halves approximately over time. Most often, younger offspring die by older ones and especially those that do not have sufficient reaction ability for defense compared to their siblings or even neglect their movements. It is possible to exchange both juveniles and mother of Coelotes terrestris respectively. The mothers show no reaction to such newcomers that are not part of their own brood. The mothers show no reaction. Juveniles in earlier stages seem to adapt to each other, while this is no longer the case in those already more advanced. In that case, the juveniles keep away from the others and try to flee from the foreign care. This reveals that the juveniles of Coelotes terrestris can distinguish the web of their own mother from that of others.

===== Evolutionary development of brood care behavior =====
The juveniles of Coelotes terrestris come into contact during their stay in the mother's web with organisms that they themselves, unlike the mother, cannot subdue. This behavior thus proves that the juveniles of Coelotes terrestris grow up in areas where insufficient necessary prey animals for them occur and have adapted in the course of evolution to the care of their mother due to lack of alternative survival abilities. Also, the registration of the mother and the juveniles among each other including mutual behavior seems based on evolutionary selection adaptations. Nevertheless, the brood care of the species seems on account of the cannibalism occurring among the juveniles as well as the great variation of the brood care behavior by the female of Coelotes terrestris. There are parallels to various spider species referred to as "social spiders", in which intraspecific associations are pronounced over the entire lifetime.

==== Maturation of the juveniles ====
Once the juveniles of Coelotes terrestris have become independent, they grow at least at room temperature in the case of females over nine and in the case of males over eight months. Notably, Coelotes terrestris, unlike many other spiders, molts easily in any position and at any stage. After hatching in July, the juveniles undergo four to five molts in the hatching year and then overwinter in half-grown state. Young females reach already from the sixth and young males from the fifth week 65% of their final body length. Then follows a latency period of varying length depending on adjustment, amounting to a period of about three months. In rare cases, males can reach sexual maturity prematurely, which then occurs with the sixth molt after leaving the mother's care. The lifespan then equals the development duration.

== Taxonomy ==
The taxonomy of Coelotes terrestris underwent several changes. The species name terrestris comes from the Latin language and means earthly or terrestrial, thus stemming from the ground-dwelling lifestyle of the spider. Unlike what its German common name might suggest, Coelotes terrestris is not the type species of the genus Coelotes. This is Coelotes atropos (under the synonymous name Coelotes saxatilis Blackwall, 1841).

Coelotes terrestris was placed in the former genus Aranea Walckenaer, 1802 under the designation A. terrestris in the 1834 first description by Karl Friedrich Wider (Walckenaer used the genus name Aranea for all spiders, but this is the only species placed by Wider in this genus). Later, it was assigned by many authors to the genus Amaurobius. There was long dispute over the correct use of this genus name because Carl Ludwig Koch introduced the name twice with different type species. This was only resolved by the ICZN formally fixing the genus name Coelotes Blackwall, 1841. The still current designation C. terrestris for Coelotes terrestris was first used in 1897 by Cornelius Chyzer and Władysław Kulczyński and has been the consistently applied name for the species since a genus revision by Rose de Blauwe in 1973.
