= Coelotes poleneci =

Scientific classification
- Kingdom: Animalia
- Phylum: Arthropoda
- Subphylum: Chelicerata
- Class: Arachnida
- Order: Araneae
- Infraorder: Araneomorphae
- Family: Agelenidae
- Genus: Coelotes
- Species: C. poleneci

Binomial name
- Coelotes poleneci Wiehle, 1964

Species of spider

Coelotes poleneci is a funnel-web spider species found in the Alps (Austria, Italy and Slovenia).
