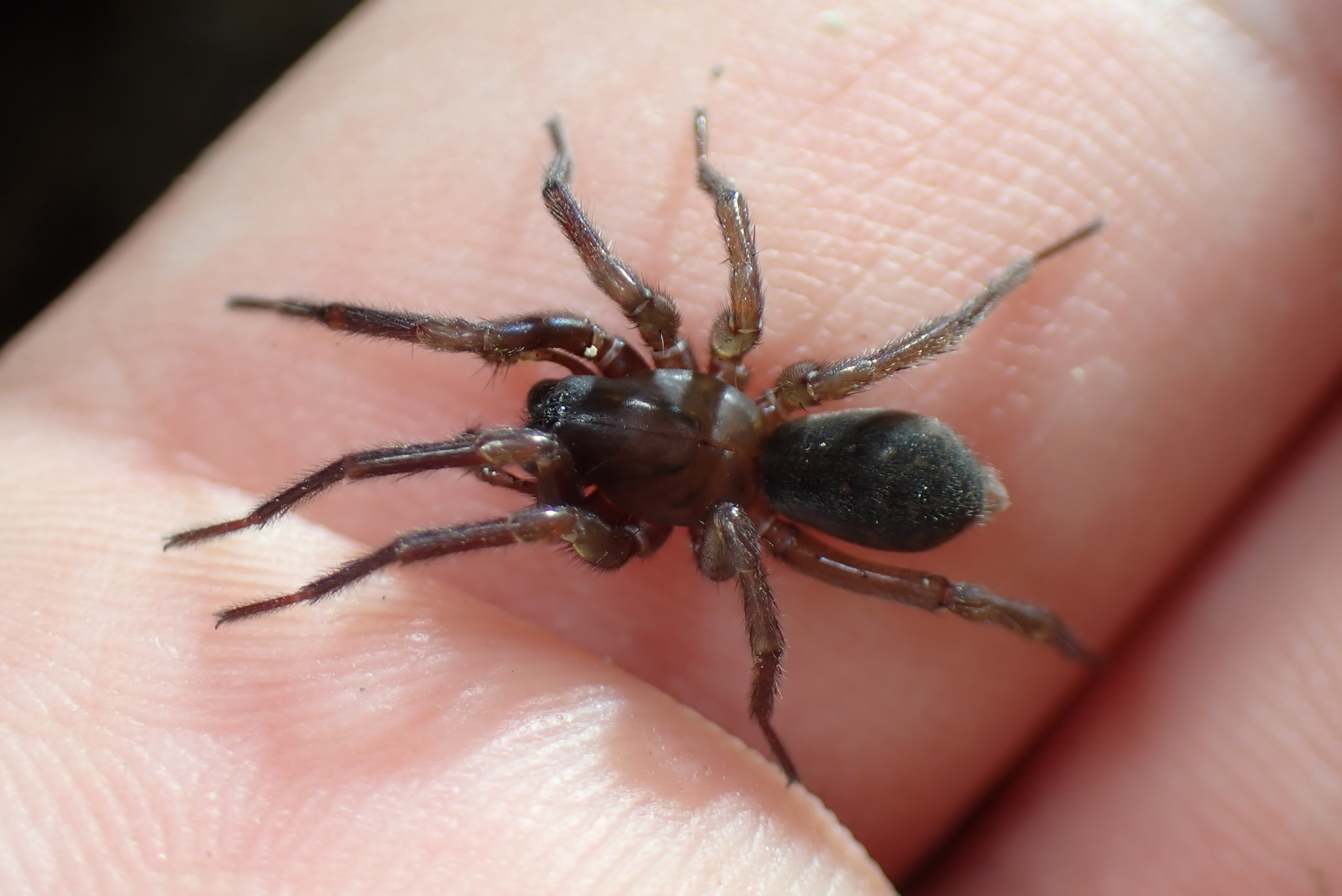
- I. inermis in France

Scientific classification
- Kingdom: Animalia
- Phylum: Arthropoda
- Subphylum: Chelicerata
- Class: Arachnida
- Order: Araneae
- Infraorder: Araneomorphae
- Family: Agelenidae
- Genus: Inermocoelotes; Ovtchinnikov, 1999

Type species
- I. inermis (L. Koch, 1855)

Species
- 15, see text

Synonyms
- Eurocoelotes Wang, 2002

= Inermocoelotes =

Genus of spiders

Inermocoelotes is a genus of funnel weavers first described by S. V. Ovtchinnikov in 1999.

== Species ==
As of October 2026 it contains fifteen species, found only in Europe:

- Inermocoelotes anoplus (Kulczyński, 1897) – Austria, Italy, Eastern Europe
- Inermocoelotes brevispinus (Deltshev & Dimitrov, 1996) – Bulgaria
- Inermocoelotes deltshevi (Dimitrov, 1996) – Macedonia, Bulgaria
- Inermocoelotes drenskii (Deltshev, 1990) – Bulgaria
- Inermocoelotes falciger (Kulczyński, 1897) – Eastern Europe
- Inermocoelotes gasperinii (Simon, 1891) – Croatia, Montenegro
- Inermocoelotes halanensis (Wang, Zhu & Li, 2010) – Croatia
- Inermocoelotes inermis (L. Koch, 1855) (type) – Europe
- Inermocoelotes jurinitschi (Drensky, 1915) – Bulgaria
- Inermocoelotes karlinskii (Kulczyński, 1906) – South-eastern Europe
- Inermocoelotes kulczynskii (Drensky, 1915) – Macedonia, Bulgaria
- Inermocoelotes melovskii Komnenov, 2017 – Macedonia
- Inermocoelotes microlepidus (de Blauwe, 1973) – Italy, Bulgaria
- Inermocoelotes paramicrolepidus (Wang, Zhu & Li, 2010) – Greece
- Inermocoelotes xinpingwangi (Deltshev, 2009) – Bulgaria
