= Inermocoelotes microlepidus =

Scientific classification
- Kingdom: Animalia
- Phylum: Arthropoda
- Subphylum: Chelicerata
- Class: Arachnida
- Order: Araneae
- Infraorder: Araneomorphae
- Family: Agelenidae
- Genus: Inermocoelotes
- Species: I. microlepidus

Binomial name
- Inermocoelotes microlepidus (de Blauwe, 1973)

Species of spider

Inermocoelotes microlepidus is a funnel-web spider species found in Italy, Bulgaria and Macedonia.
