= Inermocoelotes xinpingwangi =

Scientific classification
- Kingdom: Animalia
- Phylum: Arthropoda
- Subphylum: Chelicerata
- Class: Arachnida
- Order: Araneae
- Infraorder: Araneomorphae
- Family: Agelenidae
- Genus: Inermocoelotes
- Species: I. xinpingwangi

Binomial name
- Inermocoelotes xinpingwangi (Deltshev, 2009)

Species of spider

Inermocoelotes xinpingwangi is a funnel-web spider species found in Bulgaria.
