= Inermocoelotes brevispinus =

Scientific classification
- Kingdom: Animalia
- Phylum: Arthropoda
- Subphylum: Chelicerata
- Class: Arachnida
- Order: Araneae
- Infraorder: Araneomorphae
- Family: Agelenidae
- Genus: Inermocoelotes
- Species: I. brevispinus

Binomial name
- Inermocoelotes brevispinus (Deltshev & Dimitrov, 1996)

Species of spider

Inermocoelotes brevispinus is a spider species in the family Agelenidae, found in Bulgaria.
