= Inermocoelotes paramicrolepidus =

Scientific classification
- Kingdom: Animalia
- Phylum: Arthropoda
- Subphylum: Chelicerata
- Class: Arachnida
- Order: Araneae
- Infraorder: Araneomorphae
- Family: Agelenidae
- Genus: Inermocoelotes
- Species: I. paramicrolepidus

Binomial name
- Inermocoelotes paramicrolepidus (Wang, Zhu & Li, 2010)

Species of spider

Inermocoelotes paramicrolepidus is a funnel-web spider species found in Greece.
