= Inermocoelotes jurinitschi =

Scientific classification
- Kingdom: Animalia
- Phylum: Arthropoda
- Subphylum: Chelicerata
- Class: Arachnida
- Order: Araneae
- Infraorder: Araneomorphae
- Family: Agelenidae
- Genus: Inermocoelotes
- Species: I. jurinitschi

Binomial name
- Inermocoelotes jurinitschi (Drensky, 1915)

Species of spider

Inermocoelotes jurinitschi is a funnel-web spider species found in Bulgaria.

== Description ==
Male reaches 8,35 mm in total length (cephalothorax - 4,03 mm) . Pedipalp femur cylindriform with weak spines ventrally on basal side and stout spines dorsally on apical side. Patella with stout spines. Tibia with weak and stout spines and with characteristic blunt apophysis. Cymbium with normal tip provided with some stout spines and with characteristic of all Coelotes sensu lato lateral margin. The most characteristic for the bulb is the long and narrow conductor.
