= Draconarius (spider) =

Scientific classification
- Kingdom: Animalia
- Phylum: Arthropoda
- Subphylum: Chelicerata
- Class: Arachnida
- Order: Araneae
- Infraorder: Araneomorphae
- Family: Agelenidae
- Genus: Draconarius; Ovtchinnikov, 1999

Type species
- D. venustus Ovtchinnikov, 1999

Species
- 281, see text
- blue: reported countries (WSC)

Genus of spiders

Draconarius is a genus of Asian funnel weavers first described by S. V. Ovtchinnikov in 1999.

== Distribution ==
Spiders in this genus are found in Asia from Tajikistan to Japan, with most species endemic to China.

== Description ==
The body is slender, with legs of normal length.

== Etymology ==
The genus is named after Latin drăcōnārĭus "standard-bearer", for the long shape of parts of the male palp.

== Taxonomy ==
The genus was originally described in 1999 with just the type species.

In 2002, H.H. Wang recognized that Coelotes was a polyphyletic wastebasket genus, transferring dozens of species to Draconarius.

Since a 2017 molecular study, it was recognized that Draconarius itself is polyphyletic, with species being transferred to other genera, such as Sinodraconarius, Nuconarius, and Hengconarius.

== Species ==
As of October 2026, this genus includes 281 species:

- D. abbreviatus Dankittipakul & Wang, 2003 – Thailand
- D. absentis Wang, 2003 – China
- D. acidentatus (Peng & Yin, 1998) – China
- D. acutus Xu & Li, 2008 – China
- D. adligansus (Peng & Yin, 1998) – China
- D. adnatus Wang, Griswold & Miller, 2010 – China
- D. agrestis Wang, 2003 – China
- D. altissimus (Hu, 2001) – China
- D. anceps Wang, Griswold & Miller, 2010 – China
- D. annulatus L. Y. Wang, Y. C. Wang, Wu & Zhang, 2021 – China
- D. anthonyi Dankittipakul & Wang, 2003 – Thailand
- D. arcuatus (Chen, 1984) – China
- D. argenteus (Wang, Yin, Peng & Xie, 1990) – China
- D. aspinatus (Wang, Yin, Peng & Xie, 1990) – China
- D. auriculatus Xu & Li, 2006 – China
- D. auriformis Xu & Li, 2007 – China
- D. australis Dankittipakul, Sonthichai & Wang, 2006 – Thailand
- D. baibaensis Zhao & S. Q. Li, 2019 – China
- D. bannaensis Liu & Li, 2010 – China
- D. baronii (Brignoli, 1978) – Bhutan
- D. baxiantaiensis Wang, 2003 – China
- D. beloniforis Wang & Martens, 2009 – Nepal
- D. bifarius Wang & Martens, 2009 – Nepal
- D. bituberculatus (Wang, Yin, Peng & Xie, 1990) – China
- D. bounnami Wang & Jäger, 2008 – Laos
- D. brachialis Xu & Li, 2007 – China
- D. brevikarenos Wang & Martens, 2009 – Nepal
- D. brunneus (Hu & Li, 1987) – China
- D. budanlaensis Zhao & S. Q. Li, 2019 – China
- D. calcariformis (Wang, 1994) – China
- D. cangshanensis Zhang, Zhu & Wang, 2017 – China
- D. capitellus Wang & Martens, 2009 – Nepal
- D. carinatus (Wang, Yin, Peng & Xie, 1990) – China
- D. catillus Wang, Griswold & Miller, 2010 – China
- D. cavernalis (Huang, Peng & Li, 2002) – China
- D. cavus Zhang, Zhu & Wang, 2017 – China
- D. chaiqiaoensis (Zhang, Peng & Kim, 1997) – China
- D. chenhaojuni Yu & Wei, 2024 – China
- D. cheni (Platnick, 1989) – China
- D. chuandian Zhang, Zhu & Wang, 2017 – China
- D. circinatus Li, Zhou, P. Liu, F. Liu & Peng, 2025 – China
- D. clavellatus Liu, Li & Pham, 2010 – Vietnam
- D. cochleariformis Liu & Li, 2009 – China
- D. colubrinus Zhang, Zhu & Song, 2002 – China
- D. communis Wang & Martens, 2009 – Nepal
- D. complanatus Xu & Li, 2008 – China
- D. condocephalus Wang & Martens, 2009 – Nepal
- D. confusus Wang & Martens, 2009 – Nepal
- D. contiguus Wang & Martens, 2009 – Nepal
- D. coreanus (Paik & Yaginuma, 1969) – Korea, Japan
- D. cucphuongensis Liu, Li & Pham, 2010 – Vietnam
- D. cucullatus Zhang, Zhu & Wang, 2017 – China
- D. cucullus L. Y. Wang, Y. C. Wang, Wu & Zhang, 2021 – China
- D. curiosus Wang, 2003 – China
- D. curvabilis Wang & Jäger, 2007 – China
- D. curvus Wang, Griswold & Miller, 2010 – China
- D. cylindratus Wang & Martens, 2009 – Nepal
- D. dapaensis Wang & Martens, 2009 – Nepal
- D. davidi (Schenkel, 1963) – China
- D. denisi (Schenkel, 1963) – China
- D. dialeptus Okumura, 2013 – Japan
- D. digituliscaput Chen, Zhu & Kim, 2008 – China
- D. digitusiformis (Wang, Yin, Peng & Xie, 1990) – China
- D. disgregus Wang, 2003 – China
- D. dissitus Wang, 2003 – China
- D. distinctus Wang & Martens, 2009 – Nepal
- D. dorsicephalus Wang & Martens, 2009 – Nepal
- D. dorsiprocessus Zhang, Zhu & Wang, 2017 – China
- D. drepanoides Jiang & Chen, 2015 – China
- D. dubius Wang, 2003 – China
- D. duplus Wang, Griswold & Miller, 2010 – China
- D. elatus Dankittipakul & Wang, 2004 – Thailand
- D. ellipticus Liu, Li & Pham, 2010 – Vietnam
- D. episomos Wang, 2003 – China
- D. euryembolus Wang, Griswold & Miller, 2010 – China
- D. exiguus Liu & Li, 2010 – China
- D. expansus Xu & Li, 2008 – China
- D. externus Hoang, Nophaseud & Jäger, 2025 – Laos
- D. feng Li & Wei, 2025 – China
- D. flos Wang & Jäger, 2007 – China
- D. gengma Kong, Yang & Zhang, 2025 – China
- D. gigas Wang, Griswold & Miller, 2010 – China
- D. globulatus Chami-Kranon, Sonthichai & Wang, 2006 – Thailand
- D. gorkhaensis Wang & Martens, 2009 – Nepal
- D. griswoldi Wang, 2003 – China
- D. guizhouensis (Peng, Li & Huang, 2002) – China
- D. guoi Wang, Griswold & Miller, 2010 – China
- D. gurkha (Brignoli, 1976) – Nepal
- D. gyriniformis (Wang & Zhu, 1991) – China
- D. hallaensis Kim & Lee, 2007 – Korea
- D. hangzhouensis (Chen, 1984) – China
- D. hanoiensis Wang & Jäger, 2008 – Vietnam
- D. haopingensis Wang, 2003 – China
- D. hengshanensis (Tang & Yin, 2003) – China
- D. himalayaensis (Hu, 2001) – China
- D. hui (Dankittipakul & Wang, 2003) – China
- D. huizhunesis (Wang & Xu, 1988) – China
- D. huongsonensis Wang & Jäger, 2008 – Vietnam
- D. immensus Xu & Li, 2006 – China
- D. indistinctus (Xu & Li, 2006) – China
- D. infulatus (Wang, Yin, Peng & Xie, 1990) – China
- D. inthanonensis Dankittipakul & Wang, 2003 – Thailand
- D. jiafu Zhang, Zhu & Wang, 2017 – China
- D. jiangyongensis (Peng, Gong & Kim, 1996) – China
- D. jiemuxiensis Li, Zhou, P. Liu, F. Liu & Peng, 2025 – China
- D. kavanaughi Wang, Griswold & Miller, 2010 – China
- D. kayasanensis (Paik, 1972) – Korea
- D. kozue Yu & Wei, 2024 – China
- D. labiatus (Wang & Ono, 1998) – Taiwan
- D. laosensis Hoang, Nophaseud & Jäger, 2025 – Laos
- D. latellai Marusik & Ballarin, 2011 – Pakistan
- D. lateralis Dankittipakul & Wang, 2004 – Thailand
- D. laticavus Wang, Griswold & Miller, 2010 – China
- D. latidens Wang & Jäger, 2008 – Laos
- D. latiforus Wang & Martens, 2009 – Nepal
- D. latiprocessus Yuan, Zhao & Zhang, 2019 – China
- D. latisectus Zhang, Zhu & Wang, 2017 – China
- D. latus Li, Zhou, P. Liu, F. Liu & Peng, 2025 – China
- D. levyi Wang, Griswold & Miller, 2010 – China
- D. lhasa Zhang, Zhu & Wang, 2017 – China
- D. lingdang K. Liu, J. Liu & Xu, 2021 – China
- D. lini Liu & Li, 2009 – China
- D. linxiaensis Wang, 2003 – China
- D. linzhiensis (Hu, 2001) – China
- D. longissimus Liu, Li & Pham, 2010 – Vietnam
- D. longlingensis Wang, Griswold & Miller, 2010 – China
- D. lunularis Zhang, Zhu & Wang, 2017 – China
- D. lutulentus (Wang, Yin, Peng & Xie, 1990) – China
- D. magicus Liu, Li & Pham, 2010 – Vietnam
- D. magnarcuatus Xu & Li, 2008 – China
- D. magniceps (Schenkel, 1936) – China
- D. manus Wang & Zhang, 2018 – China
- D. medogensis Zhang, Zhu & Wang, 2017 – China
- D. meganiger Wang & Martens, 2009 – Nepal
- D. meniscatus Kong, Yang & Zhang, 2025 – China
- D. microcoelotes Wang & Martens, 2009 – Nepal
- D. mikrommatos Wang, Griswold & Miller, 2010 – China
- D. molluscus (Wang, Yin, Peng & Xie, 1990) – China
- D. monticola Dankittipakul, Sonthichai & Wang, 2006 – Thailand
- D. montis Dankittipakul, Sonthichai & Wang, 2006 – Thailand
- D. multidentatus Zhang, Zhu & Wang, 2017 – China
- D. mupingensis Xu & Li, 2006 – China
- D. nangunhe Kong, Yang & Zhang, 2025 – China
- D. nanjiang Cheng & Zhang, 2023 – China
- D. nantianmen Kong, Yang & Zhang, 2025 – China
- D. nanyuensis (Peng & Yin, 1998) – China
- D. naranensis Ovtchinnikov, 2005 – Pakistan
- D. nathiagalicus Zamani, 2021 – Pakistan
- D. neixiangensis (Hu, Wang & Wang, 1991) – China
- D. nudulus Wang, 2003 – China
- D. olorinus Wang, Griswold & Miller, 2010 – China
- D. orbiculatus Zhu, Wang & Zhang, 2017 – China
- D. ovillus Xu & Li, 2007 – China
- D. pakistanicus Ovtchinnikov, 2005 – Pakistan
- D. panchtharensis Wang & Martens, 2009 – Nepal
- D. papai Chami-Kranon, Sonthichai & Wang, 2006 – Thailand
- D. papillatus Xu & Li, 2006 – China
- D. paracidentatus Zhang, Zhu & Wang, 2017 – China
- D. paraepisomos Wang & Martens, 2009 – Nepal
- D. paralateralis Dankittipakul & Wang, 2004 – Thailand
- D. paralleloides Jiang, Chen & Zhang, 2018 – China
- D. parallelus Liu & Li, 2009 – China
- D. paralutulentus Zhang, Zhu & Wang, 2017 – China
- D. paraspiralis Wang, Griswold & Miller, 2010 – China
- D. paraterebratus Wang, 2003 – China
- D. paratrifasciatus Wang & Jäger, 2007 – China
- D. paululus Jiang, Yu, Guo & Chen, 2019 – China
- D. penicillatus (Wang, Yin, Peng & Xie, 1990) – China
- D. peregrinus Xie & Chen, 2011 – China
- D. phuhin Dankittipakul, Sonthichai & Wang, 2006 – Thailand
- D. phulchokiensis Wang & Martens, 2009 – Nepal
- D. pictus (Hu, 2001) – China
- D. pinguis Jiang, Chen & Zhang, 2018 – China
- D. pollex Zhang, Zhu & Wang, 2017 – China
- D. postremus Wang & Jäger, 2008 – Laos
- D. potanini (Schenkel, 1963) – China
- D. prolixus (Wang, Yin, Peng & Xie, 1990) – China
- D. promontorioides Dankittipakul & Wang, 2008 – Thailand
- D. promontorius Dankittipakul, Sonthichai & Wang, 2006 – Thailand
- D. pseudoagrestis Wang, Griswold & Miller, 2010 – China
- D. pseudoclavellatus Liu, Li & Pham, 2010 – Vietnam
- D. pseudocoreanus Xu & Li, 2008 – China
- D. pseudodissitus Zhang, Zhu & Wang, 2017 – China
- D. pseudogurkha Wang & Martens, 2009 – Nepal
- D. pseudolateralis Dankittipakul & Wang, 2004 – Thailand
- D. pseudomeganiger Wang & Martens, 2009 – Nepal
- D. pseudopumilus Liu, Li & Pham, 2010 – Vietnam
- D. pseudospiralis Wang, Griswold & Miller, 2010 – China
- D. pseudowuermlii Wang, 2003 – China
- D. pumilus Liu, Li & Pham, 2010 – Vietnam
- D. qingzangensis (Hu, 2001) – China
- D. quattour Wang, Griswold & Miller, 2010 – China
- D. renalis Wang, Griswold & Miller, 2010 – China
- D. retrotubularis Zhang, Zhu & Wang, 2017 – China
- D. rimatus Liu, Li & Pham, 2010 – Vietnam
- D. risusus Jiang, Yu, Guo & Chen, 2019 – China
- D. rotundus Wang, 2003 – China
- D. rufulus (Wang, Yin, Peng & Xie, 1990) – China
- D. sacculus Wang & Martens, 2009 – Nepal
- D. schawalleri Wang & Martens, 2009 – Nepal
- D. schenkeli (Brignoli, 1978) – Bhutan
- D. schwendingeri Dankittipakul, Sonthichai & Wang, 2006 – Thailand
- D. semicircularis Liu & Li, 2009 – China
- D. semicirculus Wang & Martens, 2009 – Nepal
- D. seorsus Wang & Martens, 2009 – Nepal
- D. siamensis Dankittipakul & Wang, 2003 – Thailand
- D. sichuanensis Wang & Jäger, 2007 – China
- D. silva Dankittipakul, Sonthichai & Wang, 2006 – Thailand
- D. silvicola Dankittipakul, Sonthichai & Wang, 2006 – Thailand
- D. simplicidens Wang, 2003 – China
- D. simplicifolis Wang & Martens, 2009 – Nepal
- D. singulatus (Wang, Yin, Peng & Xie, 1990) – China
- D. songi Wang & Jäger, 2008 – Laos
- D. specialis Xu & Li, 2007 – China
- D. spinosus Wang & Martens, 2009 – Nepal
- D. spiralis Wang, Griswold & Miller, 2010 – China
- D. spirallus Xu & Li, 2007 – China
- D. stemmleri (Brignoli, 1978) – Bhutan
- D. streptus (Zhu & Wang, 1994) – China
- D. striolatus (Wang, Yin, Peng & Xie, 1990) – China
- D. strophadatus (Zhu & Wang, 1991) – China
- D. subabsentis Xu & Li, 2008 – China
- D. subaspinatus Zhang, Zhu & Wang, 2017 – China
- D. subconfusus Wang & Martens, 2009 – Nepal
- D. subdissitus Zhang, Zhu & Wang, 2017 – China
- D. subepisomos Wang & Martens, 2009 – Nepal
- D. sublutulentus Xu & Li, 2008 – China
- D. subrotundus Wang & Martens, 2009 – Nepal
- D. substrophadatus K. Liu, J. Liu & Xu, 2021 – China
- D. subtitanus (Hu, 1992) – China
- D. subulatus Dankittipakul & Wang, 2003 – Thailand
- D. suttisani Dankittipakul & Wang, 2008 – Thailand
- D. syzygiatus (Zhu & Wang, 1994) – China
- D. tabularis Wang & Jäger, 2008 – Laos
- D. tabulatus Zhang, Zhu & Wang, 2017 – China
- D. taihangensis Zhang, Zhu & Wang, 2017 – China
- D. tamdaoensis Liu, Li & Pham, 2010 – Vietnam
- D. tangi Wang, Griswold & Miller, 2010 – China
- D. taplejungensis Wang & Martens, 2009 – Nepal
- D. tensus Xu & Li, 2008 – China
- D. tentus Dankittipakul, Sonthichai & Wang, 2006 – Thailand
- D. testudinatus Wang & Martens, 2009 – Nepal
- D. tianlin Zhang, Zhu & Wang, 2017 – China
- D. tiantangensis Xie & Chen, 2011 – China
- D. tibetensis Wang, 2003 – China
- D. tinjuraensis Wang & Martens, 2009 – Nepal
- D. tongi Xu & Li, 2007 – China
- D. transparens Liu, Li & Pham, 2010 – Vietnam
- D. transversus Liu, Li & Pham, 2010 – Vietnam
- D. triatus (Zhu & Wang, 1994) – China
- D. tridens Wang, Griswold & Miller, 2010 – China
- D. trifasciatus (Wang & Zhu, 1991) – China
- D. trinus Wang & Jäger, 2007 – China
- D. tritos Wang & Martens, 2009 – Nepal
- D. tryblionatus (Wang & Zhu, 1991) – China
- D. tubercularis Xu & Li, 2007 – China
- D. turriformis Liu & Li, 2010 – China
- D. uncinatus (Wang, Yin, Peng & Xie, 1990) – China
- D. ventrifurcatus Xu & Li, 2008 – China
- D. venustus Ovtchinnikov, 1999 – Tajikistan
- D. verrucifer Okumura, 2013 – Japan
- D. volubilis Liu, Li & Pham, 2010 – Vietnam
- D. volutobursarius Wang & Martens, 2009 – Nepal
- D. wenzhouensis (Chen, 1984) – China
- D. wolongensis Zhang, Zhu & Wang, 2017 – China
- D. wrasei Wang & Jäger, 2010 – China
- D. wudangensis (Chen & Zhao, 1997) – China
- D. wuermlii (Brignoli, 1978) – Bhutan, Nepal
- D. wugeshanensis (Zhang, Yin & Kim, 2000) – China
- D. wui Yuan, Zhao & Zhang, 2019 – China
- D. xianningensis Zhou, Zhong & Zhang, 2021 – China
- D. xishuiensis Zhang, Zhu & Wang, 2017 – China
- D. xuae Wang, Griswold & Miller, 2010 – China
- D. yadongensis (Hu & Li, 1987) – China, Nepal
- D. yananensis Wei, J. Liu, Nan & C. H. Liu, 2025 – China
- D. yani Wang, Griswold & Miller, 2010 – China
- D. yichengensis Wang, 2003 – China
- D. yigongensis Zhao & S. Q. Li, 2019 – China
- D. yingbinensis Zhao & S. Q. Li, 2019 – China
- D. yunzhii Wei, J. Liu, Nan & C. H. Liu, 2025 – China
- D. zonalis Xu & Li, 2008 – China
