= Inermocoelotes drenskii =

Scientific classification
- Kingdom: Animalia
- Phylum: Arthropoda
- Subphylum: Chelicerata
- Class: Arachnida
- Order: Araneae
- Infraorder: Araneomorphae
- Family: Agelenidae
- Genus: Inermocoelotes
- Species: I. drenskii

Binomial name
- Inermocoelotes drenskii (Deltshev, 1990)

Species of spider

Inermocoelotes drenskii is a funnel-web spider species found in Bulgaria.
