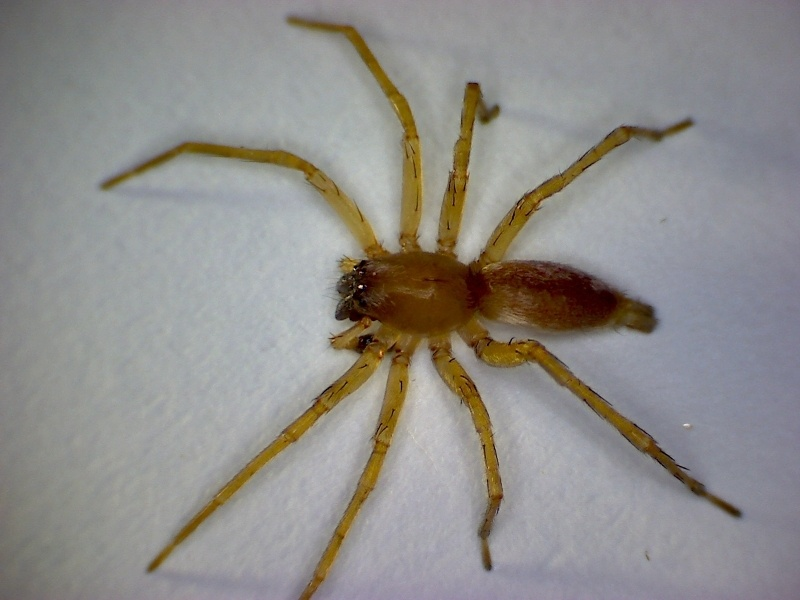
- Clubiona terrestris, male. Location: The Netherlands - Middelburg - Binnenstad

Scientific classification
- Kingdom: Animalia
- Phylum: Arthropoda
- Subphylum: Chelicerata
- Class: Arachnida
- Order: Araneae
- Infraorder: Araneomorphae
- Family: Clubionidae
- Genus: Clubiona
- Species: C. terrestris

Binomial name
- Clubiona terrestris Westring, 1851

= Clubiona terrestris =

Species of spider

Clubiona terrestris is a sac spider species found in Europe. It was described by Niklas Westring in 1851.
