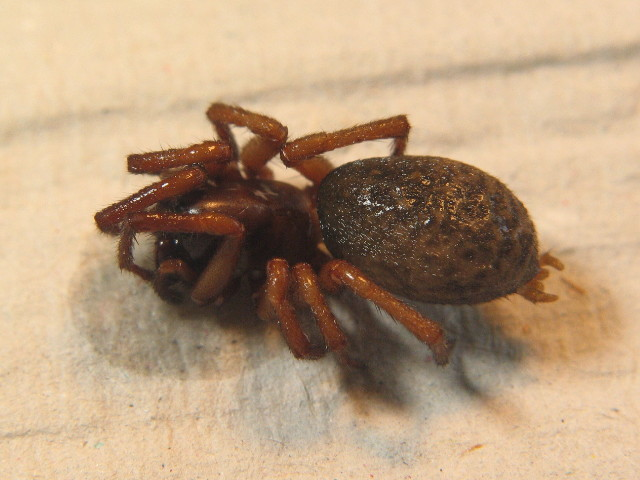
- I. inermis, female
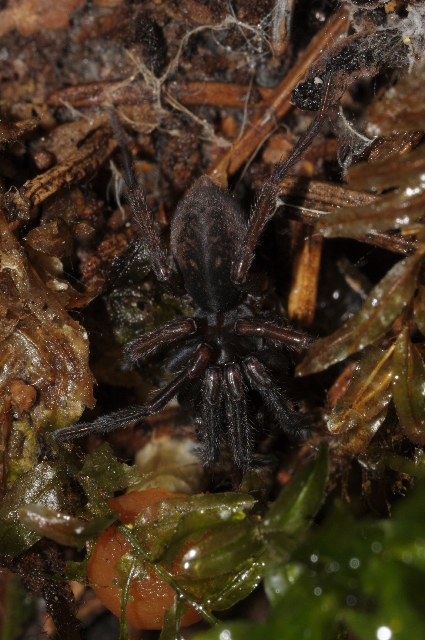
- I. inermis, male

Scientific classification
- Kingdom: Animalia
- Phylum: Arthropoda
- Subphylum: Chelicerata
- Class: Arachnida
- Order: Araneae
- Infraorder: Araneomorphae
- Family: Agelenidae
- Genus: Inermocoelotes
- Species: I. inermis

Binomial name
- Inermocoelotes inermis (L. Koch, 1855)

= Inermocoelotes inermis =

Species of spider

Inermocoelotes inermis is a species of funnel-web spider that was first described by Ludwig Carl Christian Koch in 1855.
