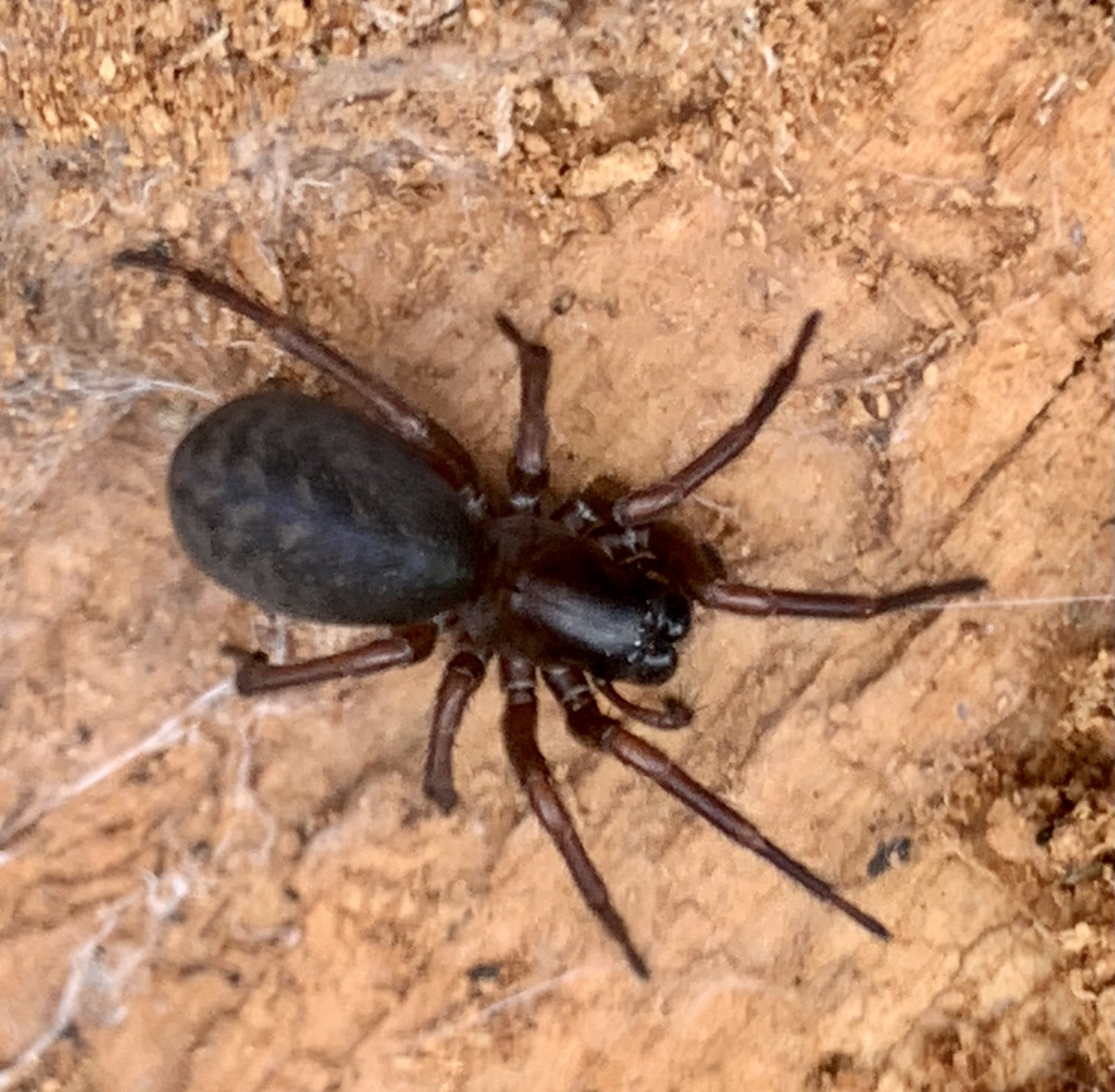
- female Coelotes terrestris in Switzerland
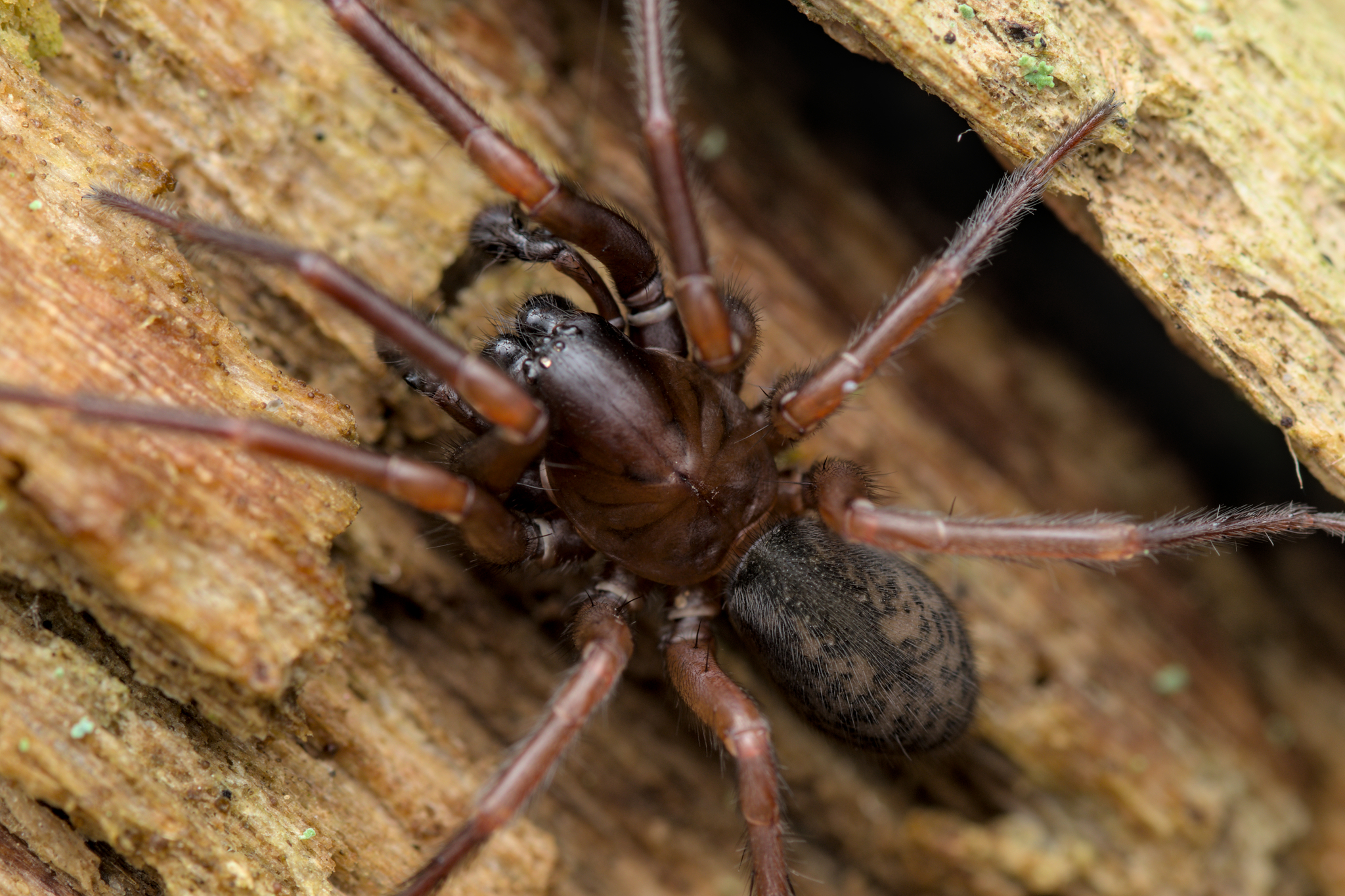
- male C. atropos in France

Scientific classification
- Kingdom: Animalia
- Phylum: Arthropoda
- Subphylum: Chelicerata
- Class: Arachnida
- Order: Araneae
- Infraorder: Araneomorphae
- Family: Agelenidae
- Genus: Coelotes; Blackwall, 1841

Type species
- Coelotes saxatilis Blackwall, 1833

Species
- 151, see text

Synonyms
- Urobia

= Coelotes =

Genus of spiders

Coelotes is a genus of funnel weavers first described by John Blackwall in 1841. A large number of species are found throughout Europe and Asia.

== Species ==
As of October 2026 it contains 151 species:

- C. acerbus Liu, Li & Pham, 2010 – Vietnam
- C. adnexus Zhang, Zhu & Wang, 2017 – China
- C. aguniensis Shimojana, 2000 – Ryukyu Islands
- C. albimontanus Nishikawa, 2009 – Japan
- C. alpinus Polenec, 1972 – Italy, Austria, Slovenia
- C. amamiensis Shimojana, 1989 – Ryukyu Islands
- C. amplilamnis Saito, 1936 – China
- C. antri (Komatsu, 1961) – Japan
- C. aritai Nishikawa, 2009 – Japan
- C. atropos (Walckenaer, 1830) – Europe
- C. biprocessis Zhang, Zhu & Wang, 2017 – China
- C. brachiatus Wang, Yin, Peng & Xie, 1990 – China
- C. brevis Xu & Li, 2007 – China
- C. capacilimbus Xu & Li, 2006 – China
- C. cavicola (Komatsu, 1961) – Japan
- C. chenzhou Zhang & Yin, 2001 – China
- C. chishuiensis Zhang, Zhu & Wang, 2017 – China
- C. colosseus Xu & Li, 2007 – China
- C. conversus Xu & Li, 2006 – China
- C. cristiformis Jiang, Chen & Zhang, 2018 – China
- C. curvilamnis Ovtchinnikov, 2000 – Kyrgyzstan
  - Coelotes c. alatauensis Ovtchinnikov, 2000 – Kazakhstan, Kyrgyzstan
  - Coelotes c. boomensis Ovtchinnikov, 2000 – Kyrgyzstan
- C. cylistus Peng & Wang, 1997 – China
- C. degeneratus Liu & Li, 2009 – China
- C. doii Nishikawa, 2009 – Japan
- C. dormans Nishikawa, 2009 – Japan
- C. eharai Arita, 1976 – Japan
- C. enasanus Nishikawa, 2009 – Japan
- C. everesti Hu, 2001 – China
- C. exaptus Banks, 1898 – Mexico
- C. exilis Nishikawa, 2009 – Japan
- C. exitialis L. Koch, 1878 – Korea, Japan
- C. fanjingensis Zhang, Zhu & Wang, 2017 – China
- C. fujian Zhang, Zhu & Wang, 2017 – China
- C. furvus Liu, Li & Pham, 2010 – Vietnam
- C. galeiformis Wang, Yin, Peng & Xie, 1990 – China
- C. gifuensis Nishikawa, 2009 – Japan
- C. guttatus Wang, Yin, Peng & Xie, 1990 – China
- C. hataensis Nishikawa, 2009 – Japan
- C. hexommatus (Komatsu, 1957) – Japan
- C. hikonensis Nishikawa, 2009 – Japan
- C. hiratsukai Arita, 1976 – Japan
- C. hiruzenensis Nishikawa, 2009 – Japan
- C. hiurai Nishikawa, 2009 – Japan
- C. ibukiensis Nishikawa, 2009 – Japan
- C. icohamatus Zhu & Wang, 1991 – China
- C. iharai Okumura, 2007 – Japan
- C. ikiensis Nishikawa, 2009 – Japan
- C. improprius (Wang, Griswold & Miller, 2010) – China
- C. indentatus Zhang, Zhu & Wang, 2017 – China
- C. introhamatus Xu & Li, 2006 – China
- C. isensis Okumura, 2019 – Japan
- C. italicus Kritscher, 1956 – Italy
- C. izenaensis Shimojana, 2000 – Ryukyu Island
- C. jianfenglingensis (Liu & Li, 2009) – China
- C. kagaensis Nishikawa, 2009 – Japan
- C. kakeromaensis Shimojana, 2000 – Ryukyu Island
- C. katsurai Nishikawa, 2009 – Japan
- C. keramaensis Shimojana, 2000 – Ryukyu Island
- C. kimi Kim & Park, 2009 – Korea
- C. kirgisicus Ovtchinnikov, 2000 – Kyrgyzstan
- C. kitazawai Yaginuma, 1972 – Japan
- C. kumejimanus Shimojana, 2000 – Ryukyu Island
- C. kumensis Shimojana, 1989 – Ryukyu Island
- C. kunigamiensis Okumura, Suzuki & Serita, 2020 – Japan
- C. lamellatus Nishikawa, 2009 – Japan
- C. laohuanglongensis Liu & Li, 2009 – China
- C. ledongensis Zhang, Zhu & Wang, 2017 – China
- C. luculli Brignoli, 1978 – Turkey
- C. maculatus Zhang, Peng & Kim, 1997 – China
- C. mastrucatus Wang, Yin, Peng & Xie, 1990 – China
- C. mediocris Kulczyński, 1887 – Switzerland, Italy, Ukraine?
- C. micado Strand, 1907 – Japan
- C. microps Schenkel, 1963 – China
- C. minobusanus Nishikawa, 2009 – Japan
- C. minoensis Nishikawa, 2009 – Japan
- C. miyakoensis Shimojana, 2000 – Ryukyu Island
- C. modestus Simon, 1880 – China, Japan
- C. motobuensis Shimojana, 2000 – Ryukyu Island
- C. multannulatus Zhang, Zhu, Sun & Song, 2006 – China
- C. musashiensis Nishikawa, 1989 – Japan
- C. nagaraensis Nishikawa, 2009 – Japan
- C. nazuna Nishikawa, 2009 – Japan
- C. ningmingensis Peng, Yan, Liu & Kim, 1998 – China
- C. noctulus Wang, Yin, Peng & Xie, 1990 – China
- C. nojimai Okumura & Zhao, 2021 – Japan
- C. notoensis Nishikawa, 2009 – Japan
- C. obako Nishikawa, 1983 – Japan
- C. obtusangulus Luo & Chen, 2015 – China
- C. ogatai Nishikawa, 2009 – Japan
- C. okinawensis Shimojana, 1989 – Ryukyu Island
- C. osellai de Blauwe, 1973 – Italy
- C. oshimaensis Shimojana, 2000 – Ryukyu Island
- C. pabulator Simon, 1875 – France, Switzerland
- C. pastoralis Ovtchinnikov, 2000 – Kazakhstan, Kyrgyzstan
- C. pedodentalis Zhang, Zhu, Sun & Song, 2006 – China
- C. perbrevis Liu, Li & Pham, 2010 – Vietnam
- C. pervicax Hu & Li, 1987 – China
- C. phthisicus Brignoli, 1978 – Turkey
- C. pickardi O. Pickard-Cambridge, 1873 – Switzerland, Italy
  - Coelotes p. carpathensis Ovtchinnikov, 1999 – Ukraine
  - Coelotes p. pastor Simon, 1875 – France
  - Coelotes p. tirolensis (Kulczyński, 1906) – Switzerland, Italy, Ukraine?
- C. poleneci Wiehle, 1964 – Austria, Slovenia
- C. polyedricus Liu, Li & Pham, 2010 – Vietnam
- C. poricus Zhang, Zhu & Wang, 2017 – China
- C. poweri Simon, 1875 – France
- C. processus Xu & Li, 2007 – China
- C. progressoridentes Ovtchinnikov, 2000 – Kyrgyzstan
- C. quadratus Wang, Yin, Peng & Xie, 1990 – China
- C. rhododendri Brignoli, 1978 – Turkey
- C. robustior Nishikawa, 2009 – Japan
- C. robustus Wang, Yin, Peng & Xie, 1990 – China
- C. rudolfi (Schenkel, 1925) – Switzerland
- C. saccatus Peng & Yin, 1998 – China
- C. septus Wang, Yin, Peng & Xie, 1990 – China
- C. serpentinus Jiang, Chen & Zhang, 2018 – China
- C. shimajiriensis Shimojana, 2000 – Ryukyu Islands
- C. simplex O. Pickard-Cambridge, 1885 – Yarkand
- C. sinopensis Danişman, Karanfil & Coşar, 2016 – Turkey
- C. sinuolatus Zhang, Zhu & Wang, 2017 – China
- C. solitarius L. Koch, 1868 – Europe
- C. songae Liu, Li & Pham, 2010 – Vietnam
- C. sordidus Ovtchinnikov, 2000 – Kazakhstan, Kyrgyzstan
- C. striatilamnis Ovtchinnikov, 2000 – Kazakhstan, Kyrgyzstan
  - Coelotes s. ketmenensis Ovtchinnikov, 2001 – Kazakhstan
- C. stylifer Caporiacco, 1935 – Kashmir
- C. suruga Nishikawa, 2009 – Japan
- C. suthepicus Dankittipakul, Chami-Kranon & Wang, 2005 – Thailand
- C. takanawaensis Nishikawa, 2009 – Japan
- C. taurus Nishikawa, 2009 – Japan
- C. tegenarioides O. Pickard-Cambridge, 1885 – Yarkand
- C. tenutubilaris Zhang, Zhu & Wang, 2017 – China
- C. terrestris (Wider, 1834) – Europe, Turkey
- C. tiantangensis Luo & Chen, 2015 – China
- C. tiantongensis Zhang, Peng & Kim, 1997 – China
- C. titaniacus Brignoli, 1977 – Greece
- C. tochigiensis Nishikawa, 2009 – Japan
- C. tojoi Nishikawa, 2009 – Japan
- C. tokaraensis Shimojana, 2000 – Ryukyu Island
- C. tokunoshimaensis Shimojana, 2000 – Ryukyu Island
- C. tominagai Nishikawa, 2009 – Japan
- C. tonakiensis Shimojana, 2000 – Ryukyu Island
- C. transiliensis Ovtchinnikov, 2000 – Kazakhstan, Kyrgyzstan
- C. troglocaecus Shimojana & Nishihira, 2000 – Okinawa
- C. uncatus Liu & Li, 2009 – China
- C. undulatus Hu & Wang, 1990 – China
- C. uozumii Nishikawa, 2002 – Japan
- C. vallei Brignoli, 1977 – Italy
- C. vestigialis Xu & Li, 2007 – China
- C. wangi Chen & Zhao, 1997 – China
- C. xinjiangensis Hu, 1992 – China
- C. yaginumai Nishikawa, 1972 – Japan
- C. yahagiensis Nishikawa, 2009 – Japan
- C. yambaruensis Shimojana, 2000 – Ryukyu Island
- C. yodoensis Nishikawa, 1977 – Japan
- C. zaoensis Nishikawa, 2009 – Japan
