= Matidia simplex =

Scientific classification
- Kingdom: Animalia
- Phylum: Arthropoda
- Subphylum: Chelicerata
- Class: Arachnida
- Order: Araneae
- Infraorder: Araneomorphae
- Family: Clubionidae
- Genus: Matidia
- Species: M. simplex

Binomial name
- Matidia simplex Simon, 1897

Species of spider

Matidia simplex, is a species of spider of the genus Matidia. It is endemic to Sri Lanka.
