= Elaver achuca =

Scientific classification
- Kingdom: Animalia
- Phylum: Arthropoda
- Subphylum: Chelicerata
- Class: Arachnida
- Order: Araneae
- Infraorder: Araneomorphae
- Family: Clubionidae
- Genus: Elaver
- Species: E. achuca

Binomial name
- Elaver achuca (Roddy, 1966)

Species of spider

Elaver achuca is a species of spider in the spider family Clubionidae. It was first named Clubionoides achuca in 1966. The species is close in structure and appearance to Elaver excepta, but the ventral division of E. achuca's tibial apophysis is not as broad as that of E. excepta, and the dorsal division is strongly curved.

The male of the species is about 1/4 inch (6.19 mm) long, with pale yellowish-brown carapace and appendages and a gray abdomen with gray-brown chevrons and stripes.

The holotype male was collected in Carr Canyon, Huachuca Mountains, Arizona, in August 1950.
