= Matidia =

Matidia can refer to:

- Salonia Matidia, niece of the Roman Emperor Trajan and mother-in-law of Hadrian, posthumously deified under the name diva Matidia
- Matidia Minor or Mindia Matidia, the second daughter of Salonia Matidia, who gave her name to the Italian village of [Matigge
- Matidia (spider), a genus of spiders
