= Porrhoclubiona vegeta =

Scientific classification
- Kingdom: Animalia
- Phylum: Arthropoda
- Subphylum: Chelicerata
- Class: Arachnida
- Order: Araneae
- Infraorder: Araneomorphae
- Family: Clubionidae
- Genus: Porrhoclubiona
- Species: P. vegeta

Binomial name
- Porrhoclubiona vegeta (Simon, 1918)

Synonyms
- Clubiona parvula Lucas, 1846, invalid name; Clubiona vegeta Simon, 1918; Microclubiona vegeta (Simon, 1918); Microclubiona tenerifensis Wunderlich, 1992

Species of spider

Porrhoclubiona vegeta, synonym Clubiona vegeta, is a sac spider species found in Southern Europe, the Caucasus, Iran, North Africa and the Canary Islands.
