= Porrhoclubiona decora =

Scientific classification
- Kingdom: Animalia
- Phylum: Arthropoda
- Subphylum: Chelicerata
- Class: Arachnida
- Order: Araneae
- Infraorder: Araneomorphae
- Family: Clubionidae
- Genus: Porrhoclubiona
- Species: P. decora

Binomial name
- Porrhoclubiona decora (Blackwall, 1859)

Synonyms
- Clubiona decora Blackwall, 1859; Microclubiona decora (Blackwall, 1859)

Species of spider

Porrhoclubiona decora is a sac spider species found on Madeira and the Azores. It was first described by John Blackwall in 1859 as Clubiona decora.

== Taxonomy ==
The species was first described in 1859 as Clubiona decora and transferred to the genus Porrhoclubiona (as Porrhoclubiona decora) in 2018.
