= Elaver madera =

Scientific classification
- Kingdom: Animalia
- Phylum: Arthropoda
- Subphylum: Chelicerata
- Class: Arachnida
- Order: Araneae
- Infraorder: Araneomorphae
- Family: Clubionidae
- Genus: Elaver
- Species: E. madera

Binomial name
- Elaver madera (Roddy, 1966)

Species of spider

Elaver madera is a species of spider in the spider family Clubionidae. It was first named Clubionoides madera when circumscribed in 1966. It is closely allied to Elaver texana and its related species, which are mostly found in the American tropics.

It is a relatively large clubionid species, about 1/2 inch (13.90 mm) in length overall. Its carapace and appendages are pale yellowish brown, and its abdomen is gray covered with fine hairs.

The female holotype and paratype were collected at Madera Canyon, Arizona in June, 1952.
