= Elaver chisosa =

Scientific classification
- Kingdom: Animalia
- Phylum: Arthropoda
- Subphylum: Chelicerata
- Class: Arachnida
- Order: Araneae
- Infraorder: Araneomorphae
- Family: Clubionidae
- Genus: Elaver
- Species: E. chisosa

Binomial name
- Elaver chisosa (Roddy, 1966)

Species of spider

Elaver chisosa is a species of spider in the spider family Clubionidae. It was first named Clubionoides chisosa when circumscribed in 1966.

The species closely resembles Elaver dorotheae. It is about 1/5th of an inch (5.26 mm) in length overall. Its carapace and appendages are pale yellowish brown, and its abdomen is gray-brown with dark chevrons and stripes.

The female holotype was collected from the Basin, Chisos Mountains, Big Bend National Park, Texas, in September 1950
