= Porrhoclubiona diniensis =

Scientific classification
- Kingdom: Animalia
- Phylum: Arthropoda
- Subphylum: Chelicerata
- Class: Arachnida
- Order: Araneae
- Infraorder: Araneomorphae
- Family: Clubionidae
- Genus: Porrhoclubiona
- Species: P. diniensis

Binomial name
- Porrhoclubiona diniensis (Simon, 1878)

Synonyms
- Clubiona diniensis Simon, 1878

Species of spider

Porrhoclubiona diniensis, synonym Clubiona diniensis, is a sac spider species found in Portugal, Algeria, Tunisia, Morocco, Spain and France.
