= Sinostidia =

Scientific classification
- Kingdom: Animalia
- Phylum: Arthropoda
- Subphylum: Chelicerata
- Class: Arachnida
- Order: Araneae
- Infraorder: Araneomorphae
- Family: Clubionidae
- Genus: Sinostidia; Yu & Li, 2021

Type species
- S. shuangjiao Yu & Li, 2021

Species
- Sinostidia dujiao Yu & Li, 2021; Sinostidia shuangjiao Yu & Li, 2021

Genus of spiders

Sinostidia is a small genus of east Asian sac spiders. It was first described by J. S. Zhang, H. Yu and S. Q. Li in 2021, and it has only been found in China. As of November 2021 it contains only two species: S. dujiao and S. shuangjiao.
