= Arabellata =

Scientific classification
- Kingdom: Animalia
- Phylum: Arthropoda
- Subphylum: Chelicerata
- Class: Arachnida
- Order: Araneae
- Infraorder: Araneomorphae
- Family: Clubionidae
- Genus: Arabellata; Baert, Versteirt & Jocqué, 2010

Type species
- A. nimispalpata Baert, Versteirt & Jocqué, 2010

Species
- A. nimispalpata Baert, Versteirt & Jocqué, 2010 – New Guinea; A. terebrata Baert, Versteirt & Jocqué, 2010 – New Guinea

Genus of spiders

Arabellata is a genus of South Pacific sac spiders first described by V. Versteirt, L. Baert & Rudy Jocqué in 2010. As of April 2019 it contains only two species, both found in Papua New Guinea.
