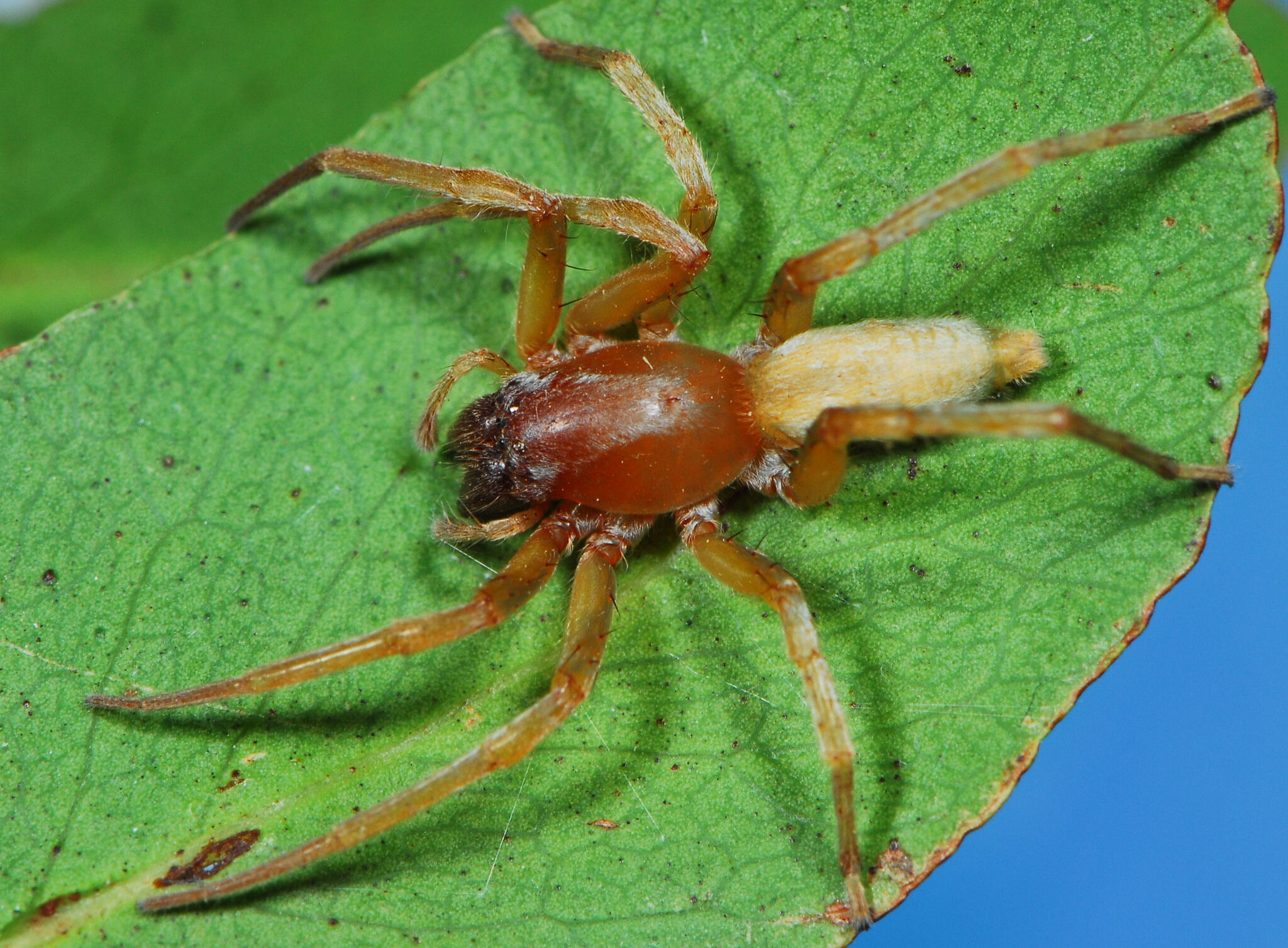
- Female
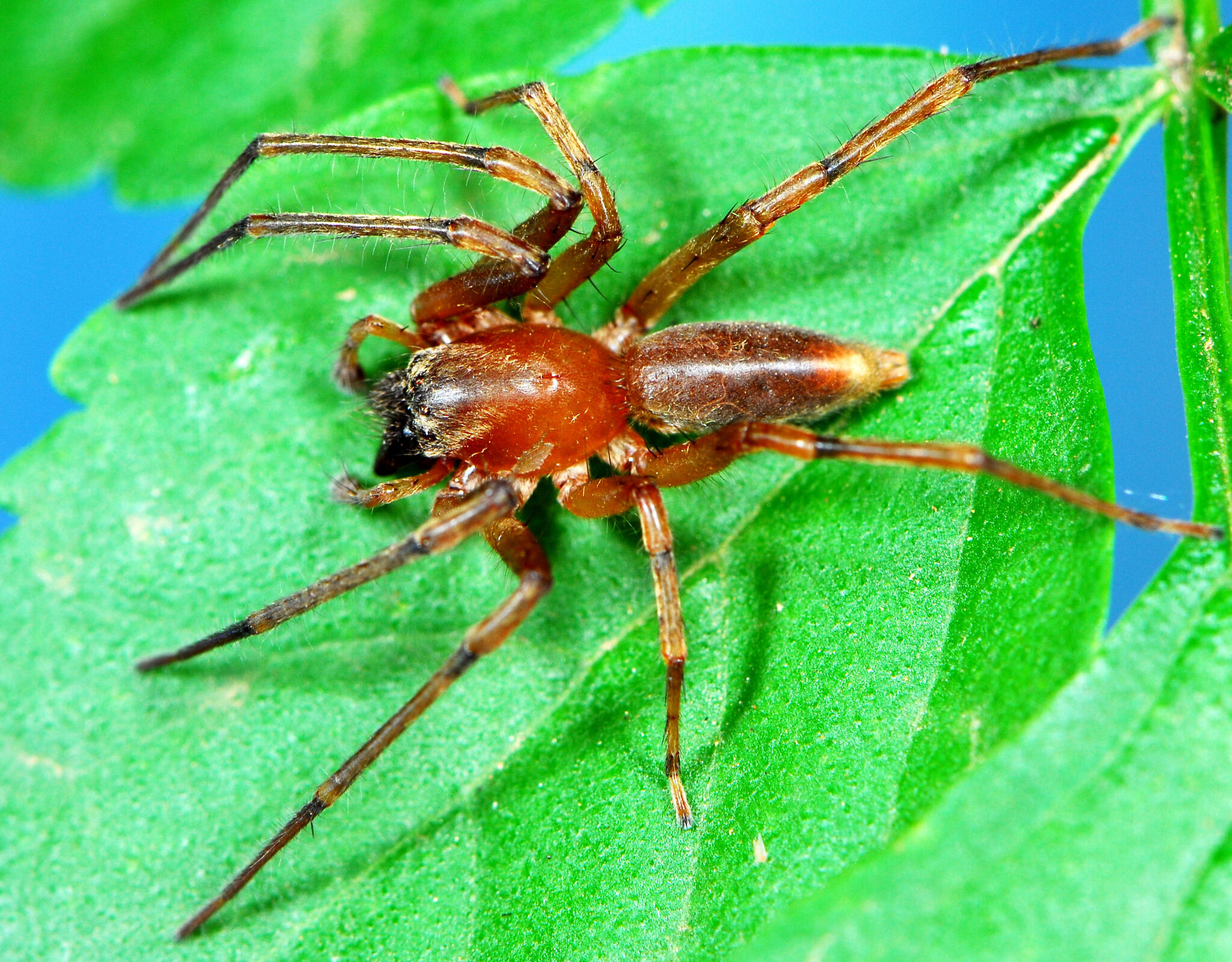
- Male

Scientific classification
- Kingdom: Animalia
- Phylum: Arthropoda
- Subphylum: Chelicerata
- Class: Arachnida
- Order: Araneae
- Infraorder: Araneomorphae
- Family: Clubionidae
- Genus: Clubiona
- Species: C. durbana

Binomial name
- Clubiona durbana Roewer, 1951

Synonyms
- Clubiona hilaris Lawrence, 1942 (preoccupied)

= Clubiona durbana =

Durban Short Legged Sac Spider

Species of spider

Clubiona durbana is a species of spider in the family Clubionidae. It is endemic to South Africa, originally described as Clubiona hilaris from Merrivale, but the name was preoccupied and replaced by Roewer in 1951.

== Distribution ==
Clubiona durbana is known from four provinces in South Africa at elevations ranging from 214 to 1781 m. It has been recorded from the Eastern Cape, Free State, KwaZulu-Natal, and Limpopo.

== Habitat ==
The species is a free-living plant dweller found in the Grassland, Indian Ocean Coastal Belt and Savanna biomes. It inhabits areas with diverse vegetation types.

== Description ==
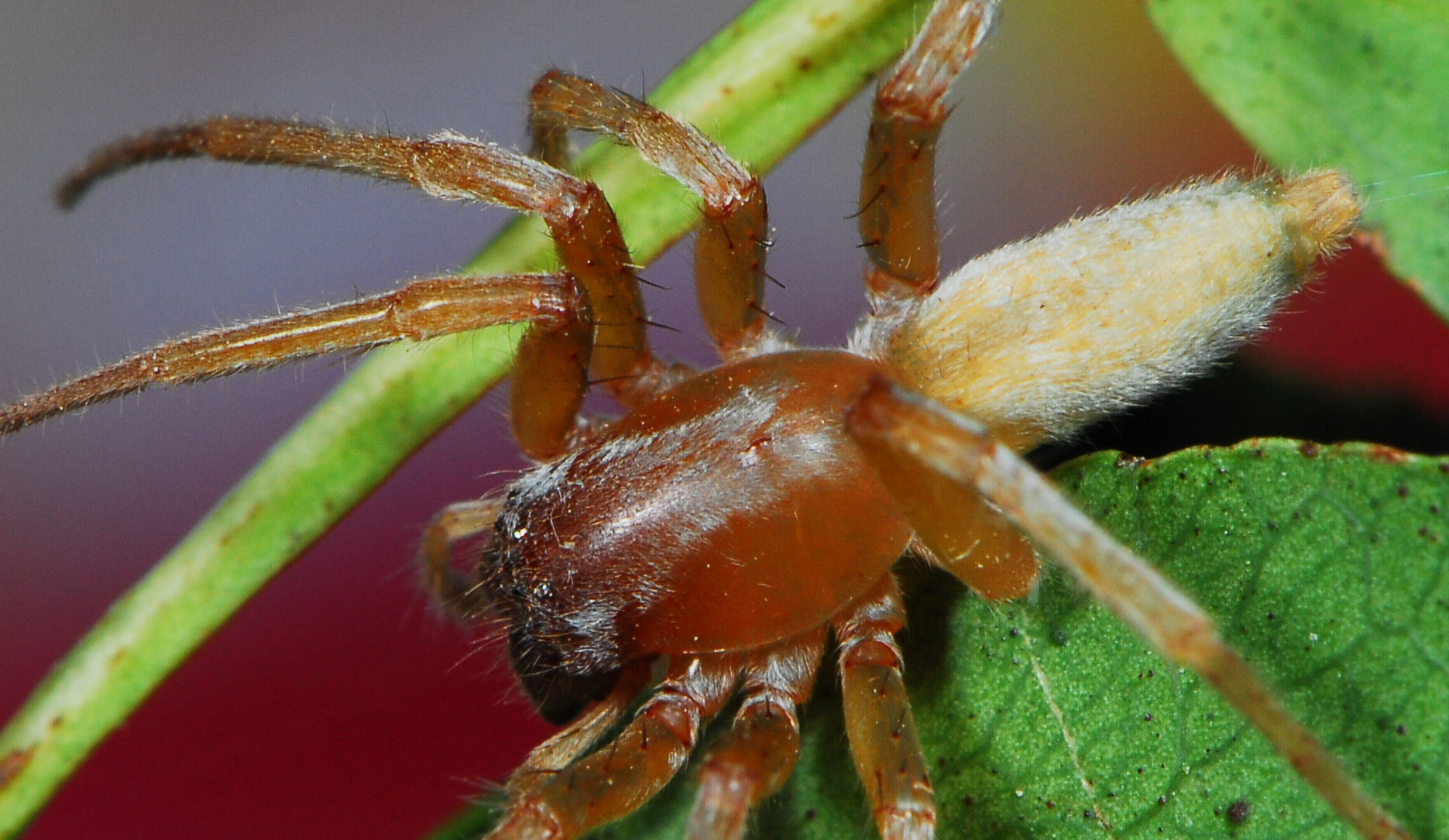
female

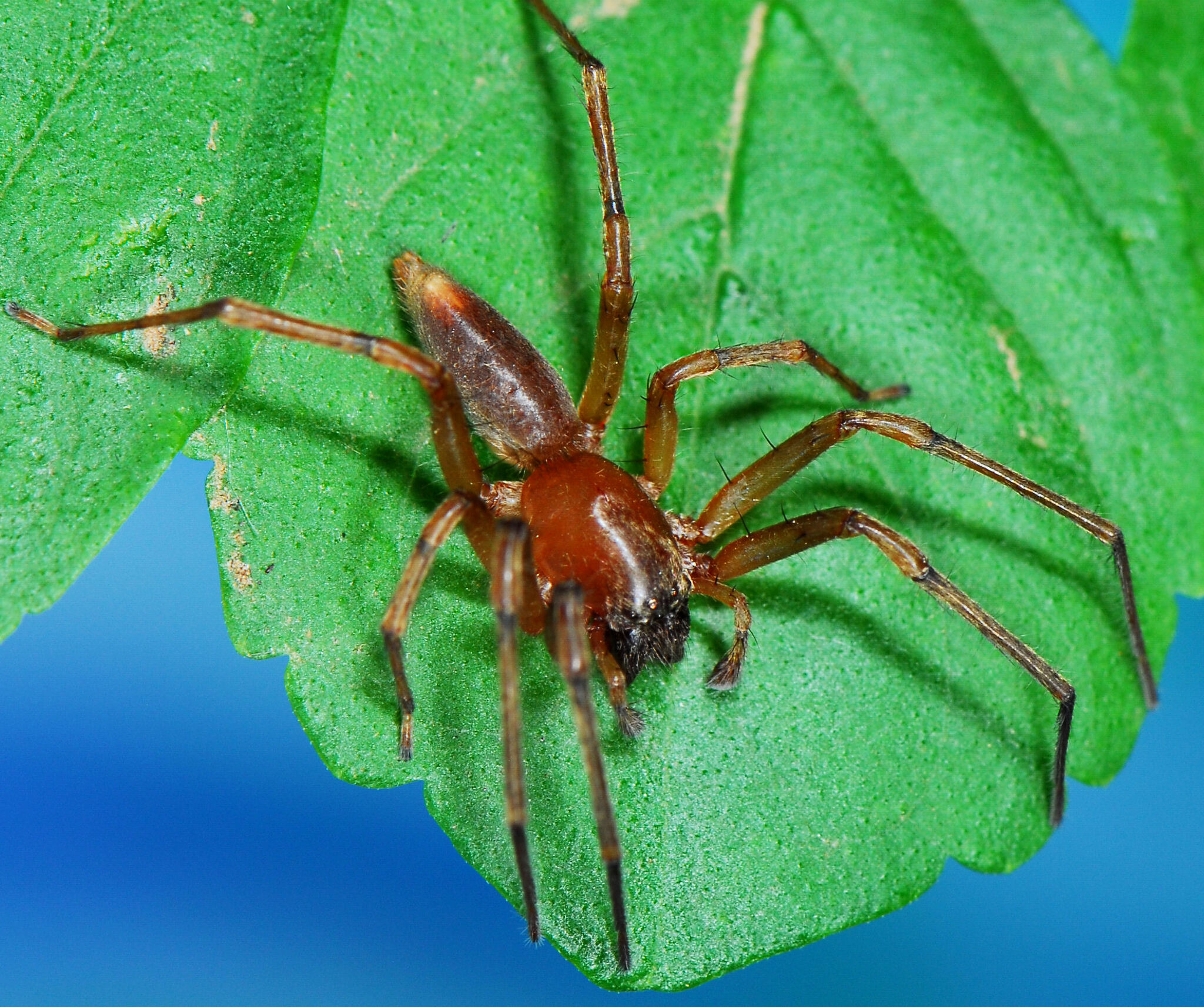
male

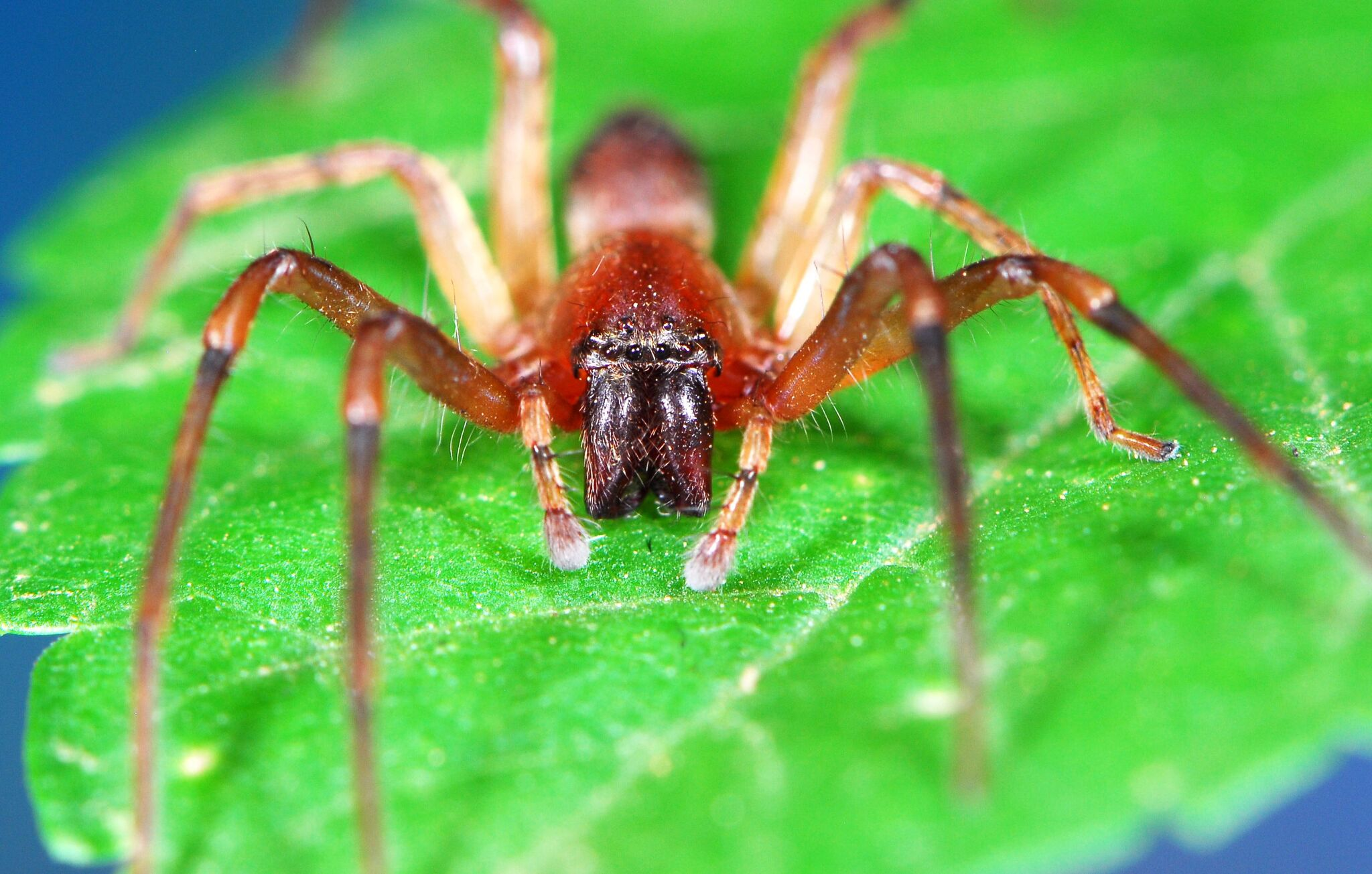
male

== Conservation ==
The species is listed as Least Concern. Although presently known only from females, it has a wide geographical range and is not suspected to be declining. It has been recorded in three protected areas, Lhuvhondo Nature Reserve, Ndumo Game Reserve, and Hluhluwe Nature Reserve.
