= Femorbiona =

Scientific classification
- Kingdom: Animalia
- Phylum: Arthropoda
- Subphylum: Chelicerata
- Class: Arachnida
- Order: Araneae
- Infraorder: Araneomorphae
- Family: Clubionidae
- Genus: Femorbiona; Yu & Li, 2021

Type species
- F. brachyptera (Zhu & Chen, 2012)

Species
- Femorbiona brachyptera (Zhu & Chen, 2012); Femorbiona phami Yu & Li, 2021; Femorbiona shenzhen Yu & Li, 2021

Genus of spiders

Femorbiona is a genus of Asian sac spiders first described by J. S. Zhang, H. Yu and S. Q. Li in 2021. As of November 2021 it contains only 3 species: F. brachyptera, F. phami, and F. shenzhen.
