= Pristidia =

Scientific classification
- Domain: Eukaryota
- Kingdom: Animalia
- Phylum: Arthropoda
- Subphylum: Chelicerata
- Class: Arachnida
- Order: Araneae
- Infraorder: Araneomorphae
- Family: Clubionidae
- Genus: Pristidia; Deeleman-Reinhold, 2001

Type species
- P. prima Deeleman-Reinhold, 2001

Species
- 6, see text

Genus of spiders

Pristidia is a genus of Asian sac spiders first described by Christa L. Deeleman-Reinhold in 2001.

== Species ==
As of April 2019 it contains six species:

- Pristidia cervicornuta Yu, Zhang & Chen, 2017 – China
- Pristidia longistila Deeleman-Reinhold, 2001 – Borneo
- Pristidia prima Deeleman-Reinhold, 2001 (type) – Thailand, Malaysia, Indonesia (Sumatra, Java)
- Pristidia ramosa Yu, Sun & Zhang, 2012 – China, Taiwan
- Pristidia secunda Deeleman-Reinhold, 2001 – Indonesia (Sumatra)
- Pristidia viridissima Deeleman-Reinhold, 2001 – Thailand to Indonesia (Borneo)
