= Malamatidia =

Scientific classification
- Domain: Eukaryota
- Kingdom: Animalia
- Phylum: Arthropoda
- Subphylum: Chelicerata
- Class: Arachnida
- Order: Araneae
- Infraorder: Araneomorphae
- Family: Clubionidae
- Genus: Malamatidia; Deeleman-Reinhold, 2001

Type species
- M. bohorokensis Deeleman-Reinhold, 2001

Species
- 5, see text

Genus of spiders

Malamatidia is a genus of Southeast Asian sac spiders first described by Christa L. Deeleman-Reinhold in 2001.

== Species ==
As of April 2019 it contains five species:

- Malamatidia bohorokensis Deeleman-Reinhold, 2001 (type) – Indonesia (Sumatra, Borneo)
- Malamatidia christae Jäger & Dankittipakul, 2010 – Laos
- Malamatidia thorelli Deeleman-Reinhold, 2001 – Indonesia (Sulawesi)
- Malamatidia vethi Deeleman-Reinhold, 2001 – Malaysia, Indonesia (Borneo)
- Malamatidia zu Jäger & Dankittipakul, 2010 – Laos
