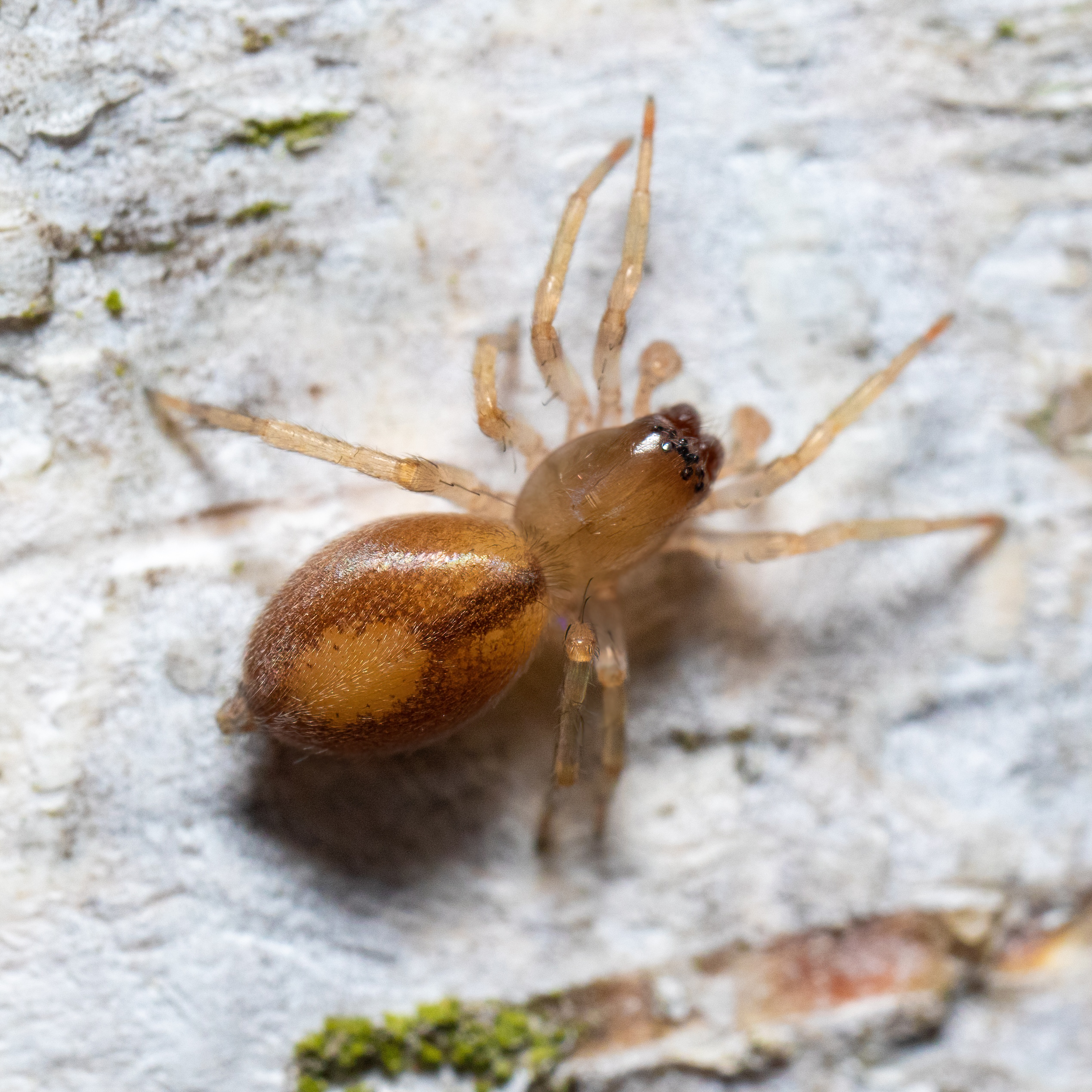
- P. leucaspis

Scientific classification
- Kingdom: Animalia
- Phylum: Arthropoda
- Subphylum: Chelicerata
- Class: Arachnida
- Order: Araneae
- Infraorder: Araneomorphae
- Family: Clubionidae
- Genus: Porrhoclubiona; Lohmander, 1944

Type species
- P. genevensis (L. Koch, 1866)

Species
- 13, see text

= Porrhoclubiona =

Genus of spiders

Porrhoclubiona is a genus of sac spiders that was first described as a subgenus of Clubiona by H. Lohmander in 1944. Clubiona is a polyphyletic group that has been divided and reorganized many times, and whether this genus is a synonym of Clubiona or an independent genus is still under debate.

== Species ==
As of October 2019 it contains thirteen species, found in Africa, Europe, and Asia:

- Porrhoclubiona bosmansi Marusik & Omelko, 2018 – Tajikistan
- Porrhoclubiona decora (Blackwall, 1859) – Madeira, Azores
- Porrhoclubiona diniensis (Simon, 1878) – Algeria, Morocco, Tunisia, Portugal, Spain, France, Italy
- Porrhoclubiona genevensis (L. Koch, 1866) (type) – Europe, Turkey, Caucasus, Russia (Europe to South Siberia), Iran, Central Asia
- Porrhoclubiona laudata (O. Pickard-Cambridge, 1885) – China
- Porrhoclubiona leucaspis (Simon, 1932) – Europe, Algeria, Morocco, Tunisia
- Porrhoclubiona minor (Wunderlich, 1987) – Canary Is.
- Porrhoclubiona moradmandi Marusik & Omelko, 2018 – Iran
- Porrhoclubiona pseudominor (Wunderlich, 1987) – Canary Is.
- Porrhoclubiona pteronetoides (Deeleman-Reinhold, 2001) – Thailand
- Porrhoclubiona vegeta (Simon, 1918) – Canary Is., North Africa, Southern Europe, Caucasus, Iran
- Porrhoclubiona viridula (Ono, 1989) – China, Taiwan, Thailand, Japan (Ryukyu Is.), Indonesia (Lesser Sunda Is.)
- Porrhoclubiona wunderlichi (Mikhailov, 1992) – Mongolia

In synonymy:

- P. baborensis (Denis, 1937) = Porrhoclubiona diniensis (Simon, 1878)
- P. parallelos (Yin, Yan, Gong & Kim, 1996) = Porrhoclubiona viridula (Ono, 1989)
- P. tenerifensis (Wunderlich, 1992, sub Microclubiona) = Porrhoclubiona vegeta (Simon, 1918)

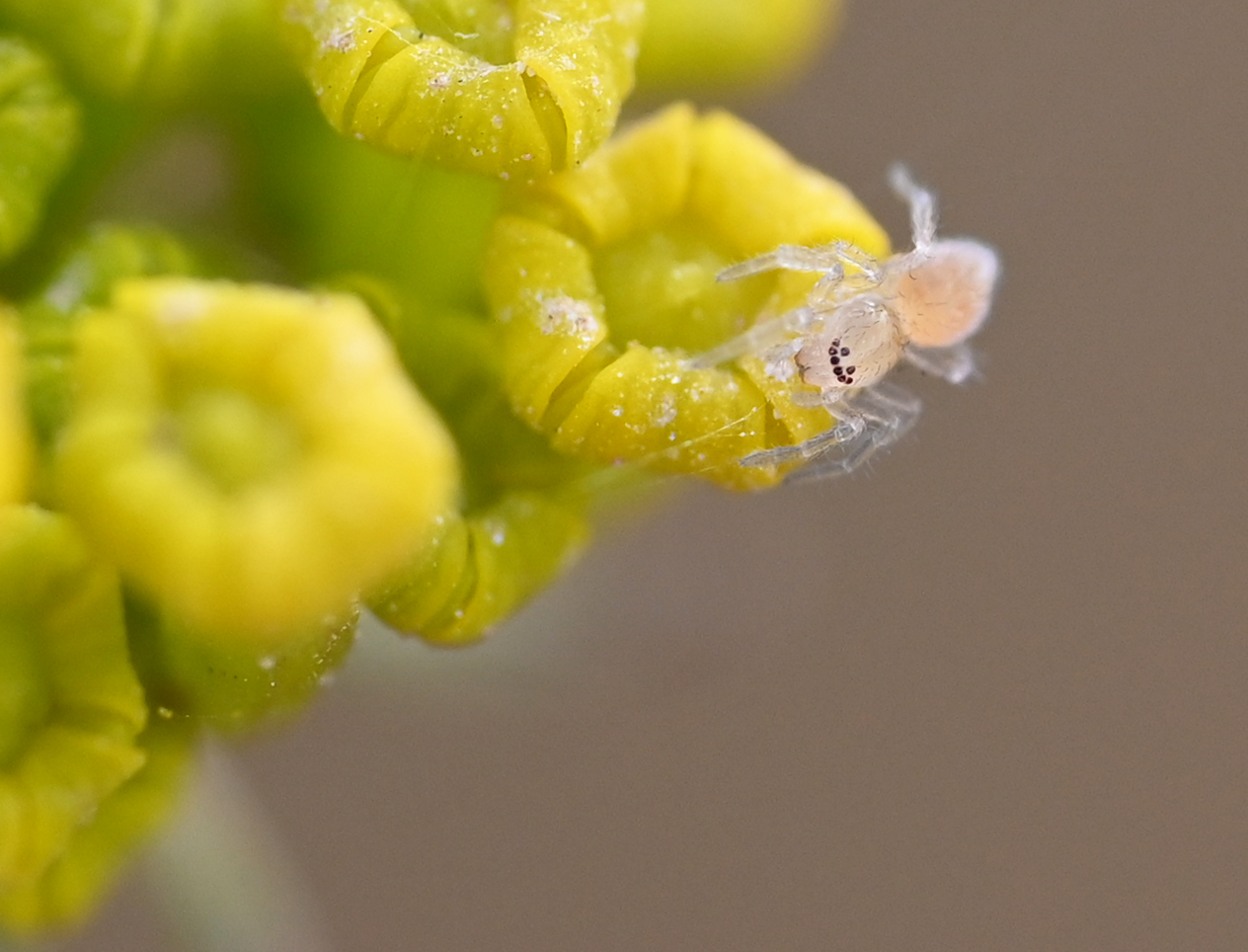
A macro shot of a very tiny spider Porrhoclubiona leucaspis on a fennel flower photographed in April 2022 in Malta
