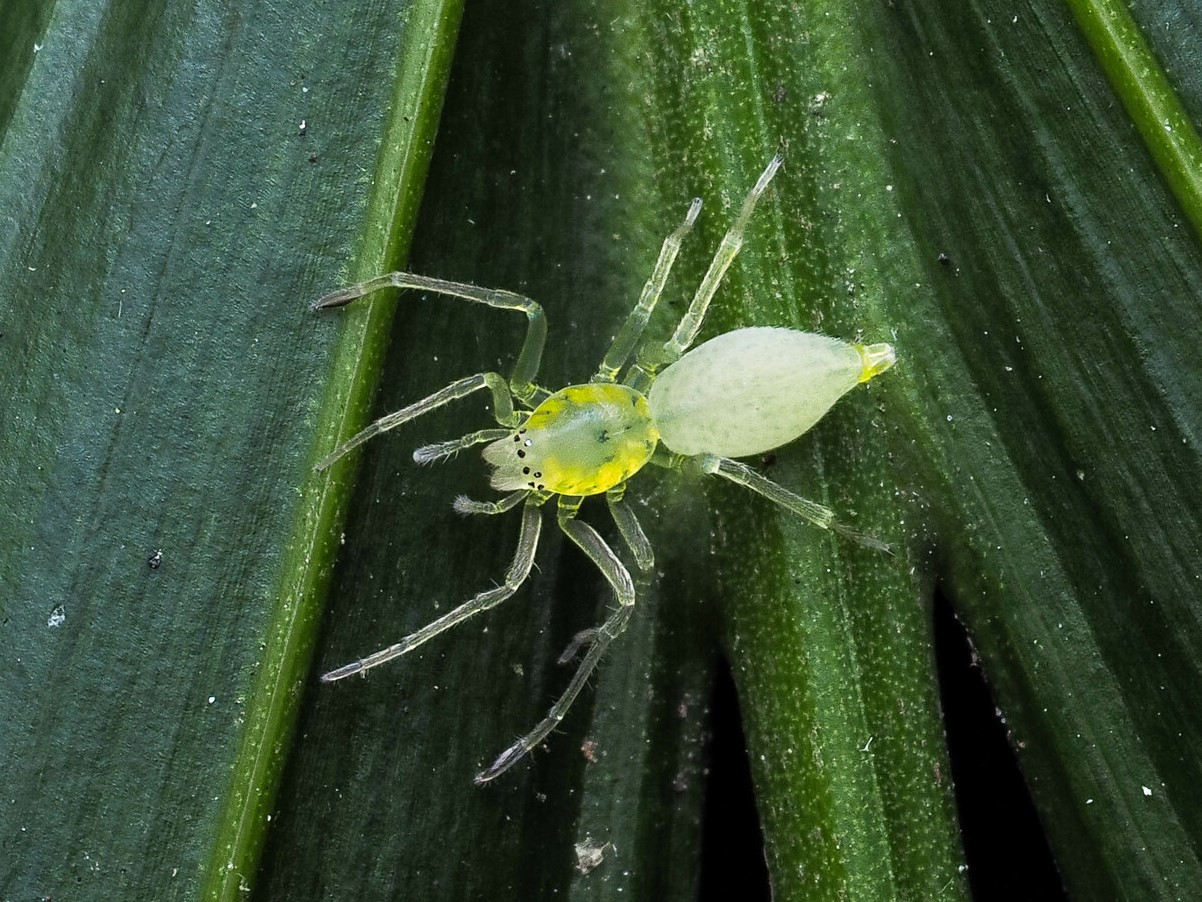
- Pteroneta spinosa

Scientific classification
- Kingdom: Animalia
- Phylum: Arthropoda
- Subphylum: Chelicerata
- Class: Arachnida
- Order: Araneae
- Infraorder: Araneomorphae
- Family: Clubionidae
- Genus: Pteroneta; Deeleman-Reinhold, 2001

Type species
- P. saltans Deeleman-Reinhold, 2001

Species
- 8, see text

= Pteroneta =

Genus of spiders

Pteroneta is a genus of sac spiders that was erected by Christa L. Deeleman-Reinhold in 2001.

== Species ==
As of April 2019 it contains eight species:

- Pteroneta baiteta Versteirt, Deeleman-Reinhold & Baert, 2008 – New Guinea
- Pteroneta brevichela Versteirt, Deeleman-Reinhold & Baert, 2008 – New Guinea
- Pteroneta longichela Versteirt, Deeleman-Reinhold & Baert, 2008 – New Guinea
- Pteroneta madangiensis Versteirt, Deeleman-Reinhold & Baert, 2008 – New Guinea
- Pteroneta saltans Deeleman-Reinhold, 2001 (type) – Malaysia, Indonesia (Sulawesi, Lesser Sunda Is.), Borneo
- Pteroneta spinosa Raven & Stumkat, 2002 – Australia (Queensland)
- Pteroneta tertia Deeleman-Reinhold, 2001 – Singapore, Indonesia (Borneo, Sulawesi)
- Pteroneta ultramarina (Ono, 1989) – Japan (Ryukyu Is.)
