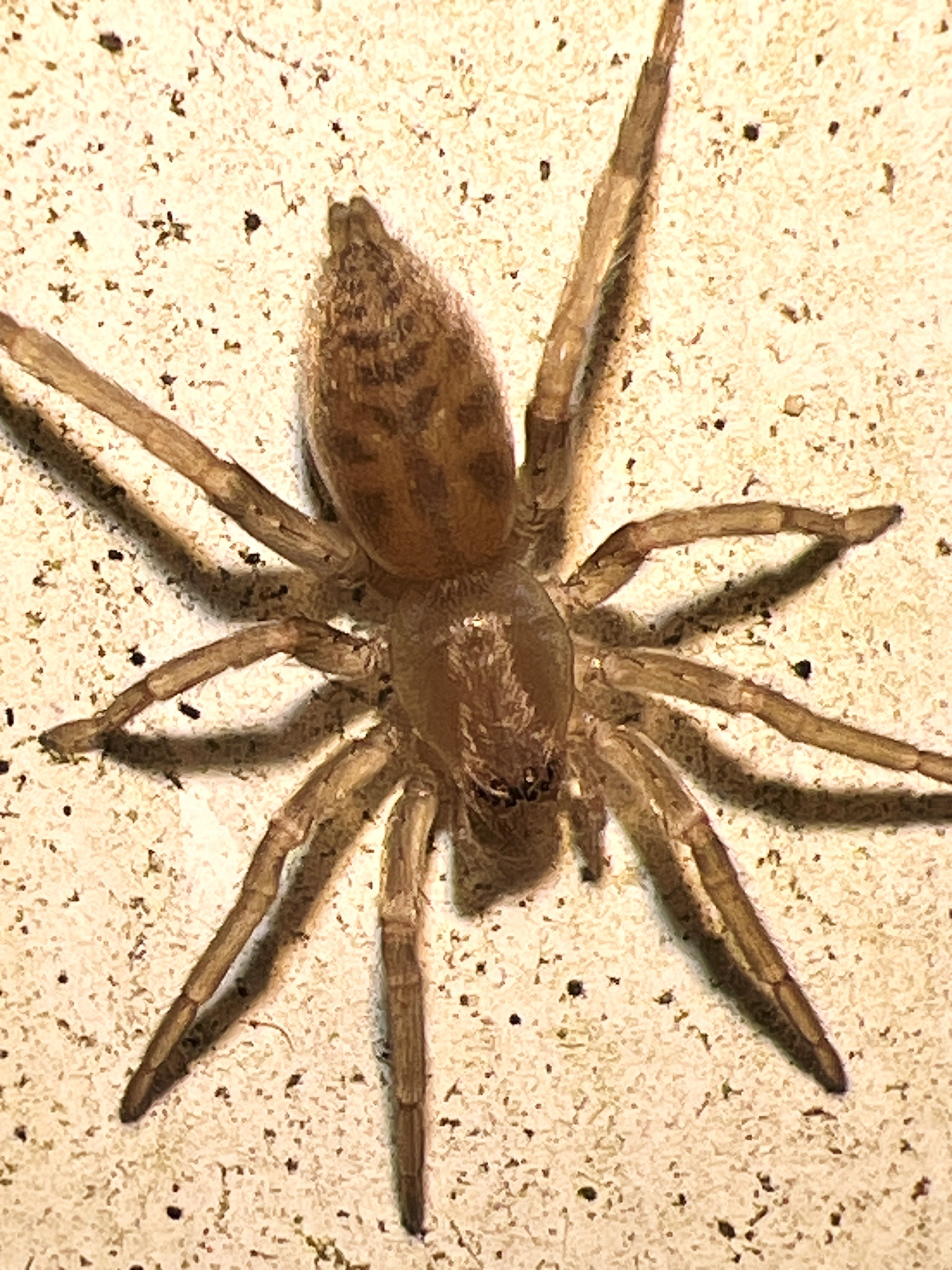
- E. excepta
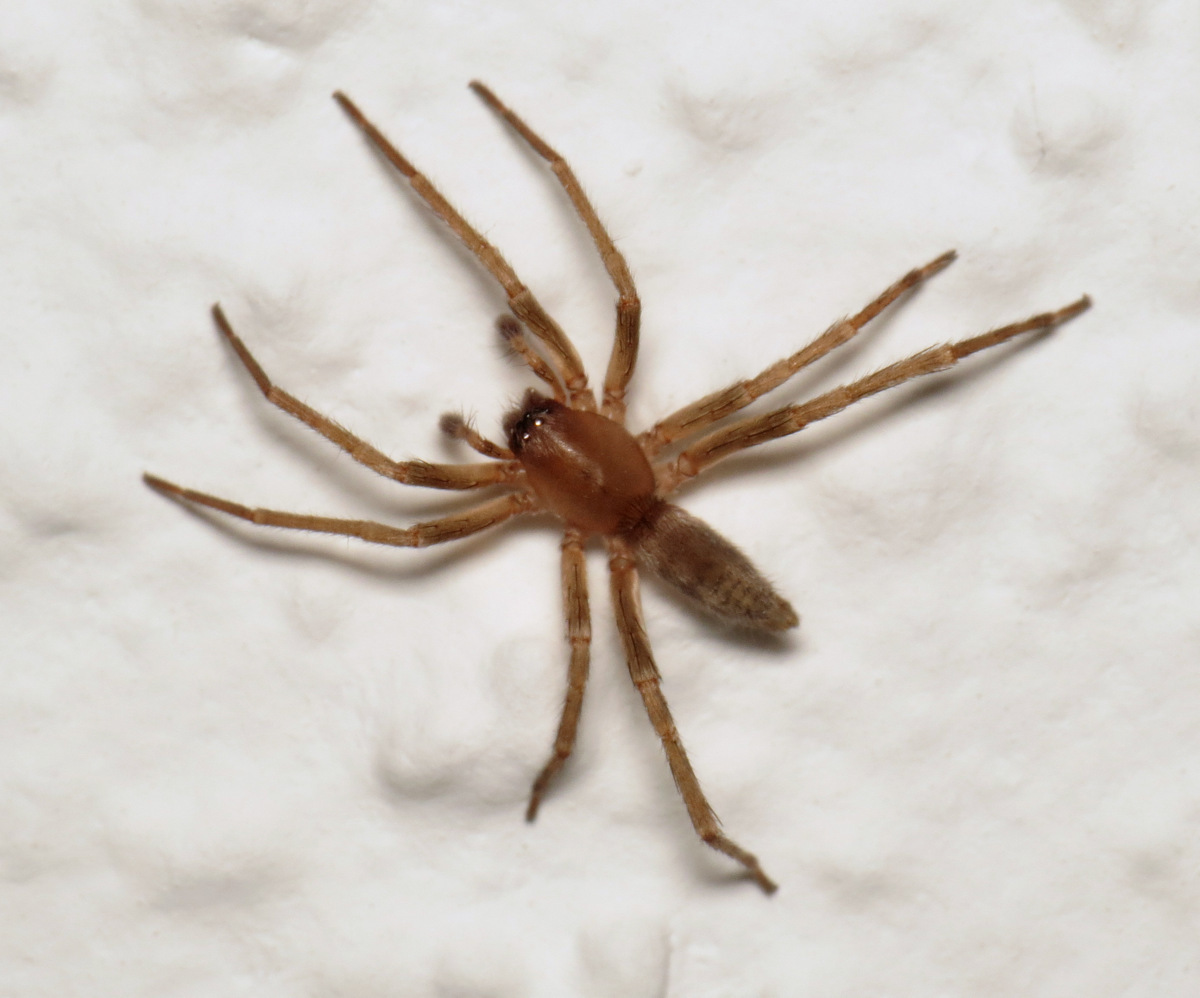
- E. excepta

Scientific classification
- Kingdom: Animalia
- Phylum: Arthropoda
- Subphylum: Chelicerata
- Class: Arachnida
- Order: Araneae
- Infraorder: Araneomorphae
- Family: Clubionidae
- Genus: Elaver; O. Pickard-Cambridge, 1898

Type species
- E. tigrina O. Pickard-Cambridge, 1898

Species
- 52, see text

Synonyms
- Clubionoides; Heterochemmis

= Elaver =

Elaver Temporal range: Neogene–present

Genus of spiders

Elaver is a genus of sac spiders first described by Octavius Pickard-Cambridge in 1898.

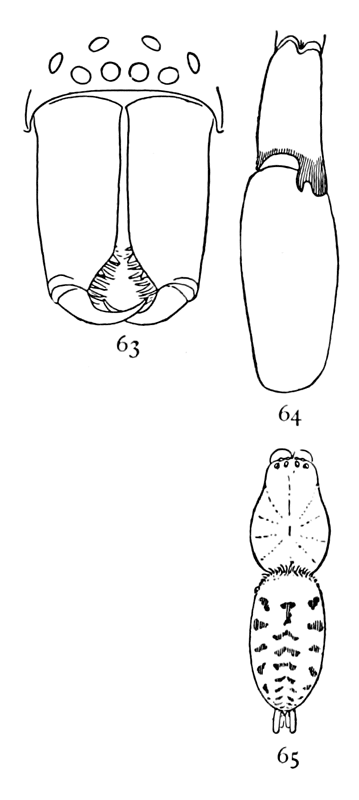
E. excepta — front of head (male), palpus (male), back enlarged four times to show markings (female)

== Species ==
As of October 2025, this genus includes 52 species:

- Elaver achuca (Roddy, 1966) – United States
- Elaver albicans (Franganillo, 1930) – Cuba, Jamaica
- Elaver arawakan Saturnino & Bonaldo, 2015 – Haiti
- Elaver balboae (Chickering, 1937) – Panama to Brazil, Cuba
- Elaver barroana (Chickering, 1937) – Panama
- Elaver beni Saturnino & Bonaldo, 2015 – Peru, Brazil, Bolivia
- Elaver brevipes (Keyserling, 1891) – Brazil, Argentina
- Elaver calcarata (Kraus, 1955) – Mexico, El Salvador, Costa Rica
- Elaver candelaria Saturnino & Bonaldo, 2015 – Mexico
- Elaver carlota (Bryant, 1940) – Cuba
- Elaver chisosa (Roddy, 1966) – United States
- Elaver crinophora (Franganillo, 1934) – Cuba
- Elaver crocota (O. Pickard-Cambridge, 1896) – Mexico
- Elaver darwichi Saturnino & Bonaldo, 2015 – Panama, Ecuador
- Elaver depuncta O. Pickard-Cambridge, 1898 – Mexico
- Elaver elaver (Bryant, 1940) – Cuba
- Elaver excepta (L. Koch, 1866) – Canada, United States, Caribbean
- Elaver gibarrai Chamé-Vázquez & Jiménez, 2025 – Mexico
- Elaver grandivulvae (Mello-Leitão, 1930) – Brazil, Bolivia
- Elaver helenae Saturnino & Bonaldo, 2015 – Mexico
- Elaver hortoni (Chickering, 1937) – Panama
- Elaver implicata (Gertsch, 1941) – Hispaniola
- Elaver juana (Bryant, 1940) – Cuba, Bahama Is.
- Elaver juruti Saturnino & Bonaldo, 2015 – Brazil
- Elaver kohlsi (Gertsch & Jellison, 1939) – United States
- Elaver linguata (F. O. Pickard-Cambridge, 1900) – Guatemala
- Elaver lizae Saturnino & Bonaldo, 2015 – Costa Rica
- Elaver lutescens (Schmidt, 1971) – Panama to Brazil
- Elaver madera (Roddy, 1966) – United States
- Elaver mirabilis (O. Pickard-Cambridge, 1896) – Mexico, Belize, Nicaragua
- Elaver mulaiki (Gertsch, 1935) – United States
- Elaver multinotata (Chickering, 1937) – Costa Rica, Panama, Colombia, Venezuela, Peru, Brazil
- Elaver orvillei (Chickering, 1937) – Panama
- Elaver placida O. Pickard-Cambridge, 1898 – Mexico
- Elaver portoricensis (Petrunkevitch, 1930) – Puerto Rico, Virgin Is.
- Elaver quadrata (Kraus, 1955) – El Salvador
- Elaver richardi (Gertsch, 1941) – Honduras
- Elaver sericea O. Pickard-Cambridge, 1898 – Mexico
- Elaver shinguito Saturnino & Bonaldo, 2015 – Colombia, Peru, Brazil
- Elaver sigillata (Petrunkevitch, 1925) – Panama, Colombia, Peru, Brazil
- Elaver simplex (O. Pickard-Cambridge, 1896) – Guatemala
- Elaver tenera (Franganillo, 1935) – Cuba
- Elaver tenuis (Franganillo, 1935) – Cuba
- Elaver texana (Gertsch, 1933) – United States, Mexico
- Elaver tigrina O. Pickard-Cambridge, 1898 – Mexico, Costa Rica (type species)
- Elaver tourinhoae Saturnino & Bonaldo, 2015 – Colombia, Brazil
- Elaver tricuspis (F. O. Pickard-Cambridge, 1900) – Guatemala, Panama
- Elaver tristani (Banks, 1909) – Costa Rica
- Elaver tumivulva (Banks, 1909) – Costa Rica
- Elaver valvula (F. O. Pickard-Cambridge, 1900) – Panama
- Elaver vieirae Saturnino & Bonaldo, 2015 – Brazil, Peru
- Elaver wheeleri (Roewer, 1933) – United States, Mexico
