= Bucliona =

Scientific classification
- Kingdom: Animalia
- Phylum: Arthropoda
- Subphylum: Chelicerata
- Class: Arachnida
- Order: Araneae
- Infraorder: Araneomorphae
- Family: Clubionidae
- Genus: Bucliona; Benoit, 1977

Type species
- Clubiona dubia (O. Pickard-Cambridge, 1870)

Species
- Bucliona dubia (O. Pickard-Cambridge, 1870); Bucliona jucunda (Karsch, 1879); Bucliona kirilli Yu & Li, 2021

Genus of spiders

Bucliona is a genus of sac spiders first described by Pierre L.G. Benoit in 1977. As of November 2021 it contains only three species: B. dubia, B. jucunda, and B. kirilli. It was synonymized with Clubiona in 1997, but was elevated back to genus in 2021. The type species was originally described under the name "Clubiona dubia".

== See also ==
- Clubiona
- Liocranum
