= Invexillata =

Scientific classification
- Kingdom: Animalia
- Phylum: Arthropoda
- Subphylum: Chelicerata
- Class: Arachnida
- Order: Araneae
- Infraorder: Araneomorphae
- Family: Clubionidae
- Genus: Invexillata; Versteirt, Baert & Jocqué, 2010

Type species
- I. maculata Versteirt, Baert & Jocqué, 2010

Species
- I. caerulea Versteirt, Baert & Jocqué, 2010 – New Guinea; I. maculata Versteirt, Baert & Jocqué, 2010 – New Guinea; I. viridiflava Versteirt, Baert & Jocqué, 2010 – New Guinea

Genus of spiders

Invexillata is a genus of South Pacific sac spiders first described by V. Versteirt, L. Baert & Rudy Jocqué in 2010. As of April 2019 it contains only three species, all found in Papua New Guinea.
