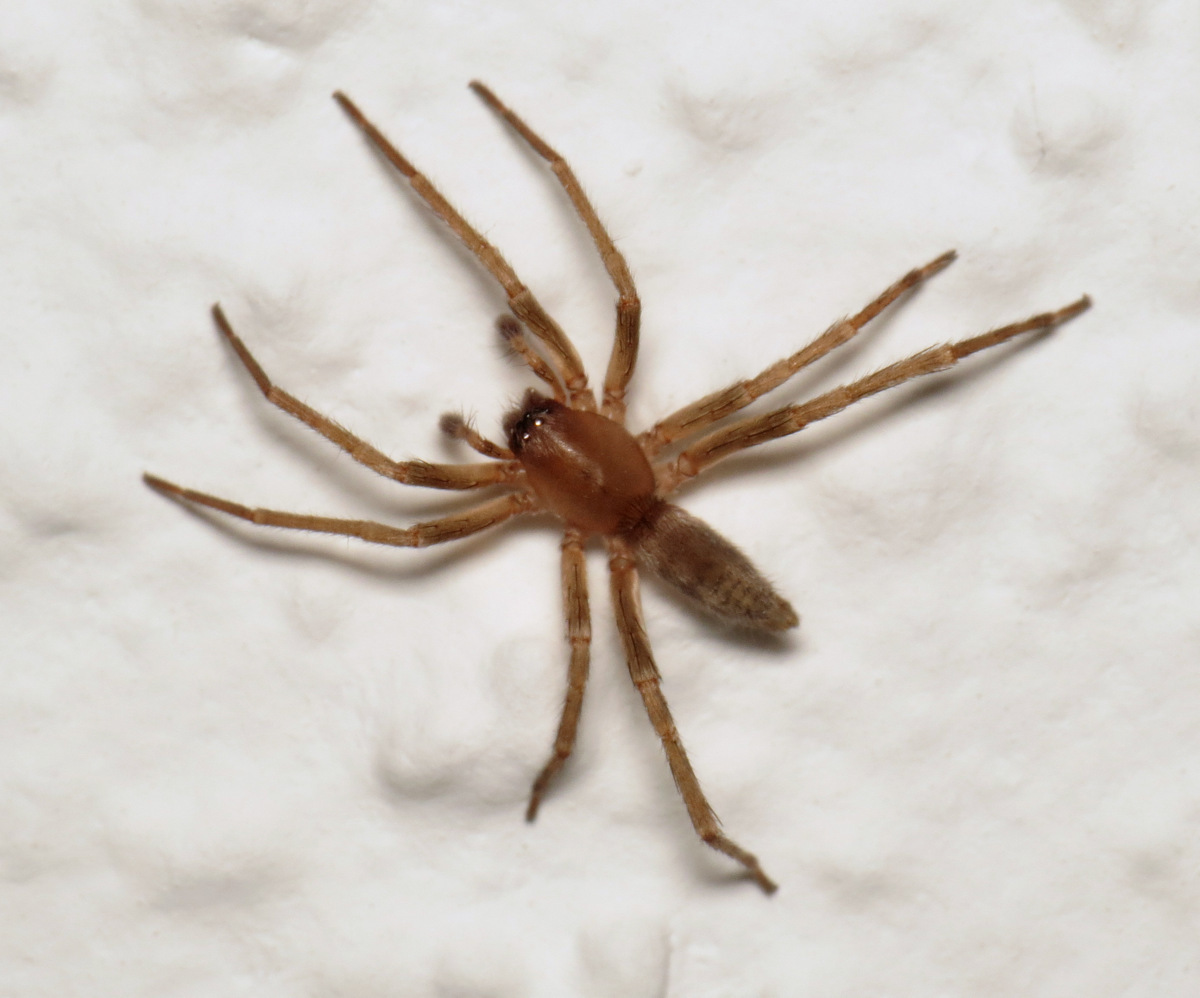

Scientific classification
- Domain: Eukaryota
- Kingdom: Animalia
- Phylum: Arthropoda
- Subphylum: Chelicerata
- Class: Arachnida
- Order: Araneae
- Infraorder: Araneomorphae
- Family: Clubionidae
- Genus: Elaver
- Species: E. excepta

Binomial name
- Elaver excepta (L. Koch, 1866)

= Elaver excepta =

Species of spider

Elaver excepta is a species of sac spider in the family Clubionidae. It is found in North America and the Caribbean.
