= Carteroniella =

Scientific classification
- Kingdom: Animalia
- Phylum: Arthropoda
- Subphylum: Chelicerata
- Class: Arachnida
- Order: Araneae
- Infraorder: Araneomorphae
- Family: Clubionidae
- Genus: Carteroniella; Strand, 1907
- Species: C. macroclava

Binomial name
- Carteroniella macroclava Strand, 1907

Genus of spiders

Carteroniella is a monotypic genus of African sac spiders containing the single species, Carteroniella macroclava. It was first described by Embrik Strand in 1907, and has only been found in South Africa. As of 2023, the genus is considered a nomen dubium by the World Spider Catalog.
