= Matidia (spider) =

Scientific classification
- Kingdom: Animalia
- Phylum: Arthropoda
- Subphylum: Chelicerata
- Class: Arachnida
- Order: Araneae
- Infraorder: Araneomorphae
- Family: Clubionidae
- Genus: Matidia; Thorell, 1878

Type species
- M. virens Thorell, 1878

Species
- 17, see text

Synonyms
- Kakaibanoides Barrion & Litsinger, 1995

Genus of spiders

Matidia is a genus of southeast Asian sac spiders first described by Tamerlan Thorell in 1878. They are nocturnal spiders with long, slender bodies of greenish coloration.

== Species ==
As of November 2021 it contains seventeen species:

- Matidia bipartita Deeleman-Reinhold, 2001 – Indonesia (Moluccas)
- Matidia calcarata Thorell, 1878 – Indonesia (Ambon)
- Matidia chlora Chrysanthus, 1967 – New Guinea
- Matidia flagellifera Simon, 1897 – Sri Lanka
- Matidia incurvata Reimoser, 1934 – India
- Matidia mas Deeleman-Reinhold, 2001 – Thailand
- Matidia missai Versteirt, Baert & Jocqué, 2010 – New Guinea
- Matidia muju Chrysanthus, 1967 – New Guinea
- Matidia paranga (Barrion & Litsinger, 1995) – Philippines
- Matidia simia Deeleman-Reinhold, 2001 – Indonesia (Sulawesi)
- Matidia simplex Simon, 1897 – Sri Lanka
- Matidia spatulata Chen & Huang, 2006 – China, Taiwan
- Matidia strobbei Versteirt, 2010 – New Guinea
- Matidia trinotata Thorell, 1890 – Malaysia
- Matidia virens Thorell, 1878 (type) – Indonesia (Moluccas, Sulawesi)
- Matidia viridissima Strand, 1911 – Indonesia (Aru Is.)
- Matidia xieqian Yu & Li, 2021 – China
