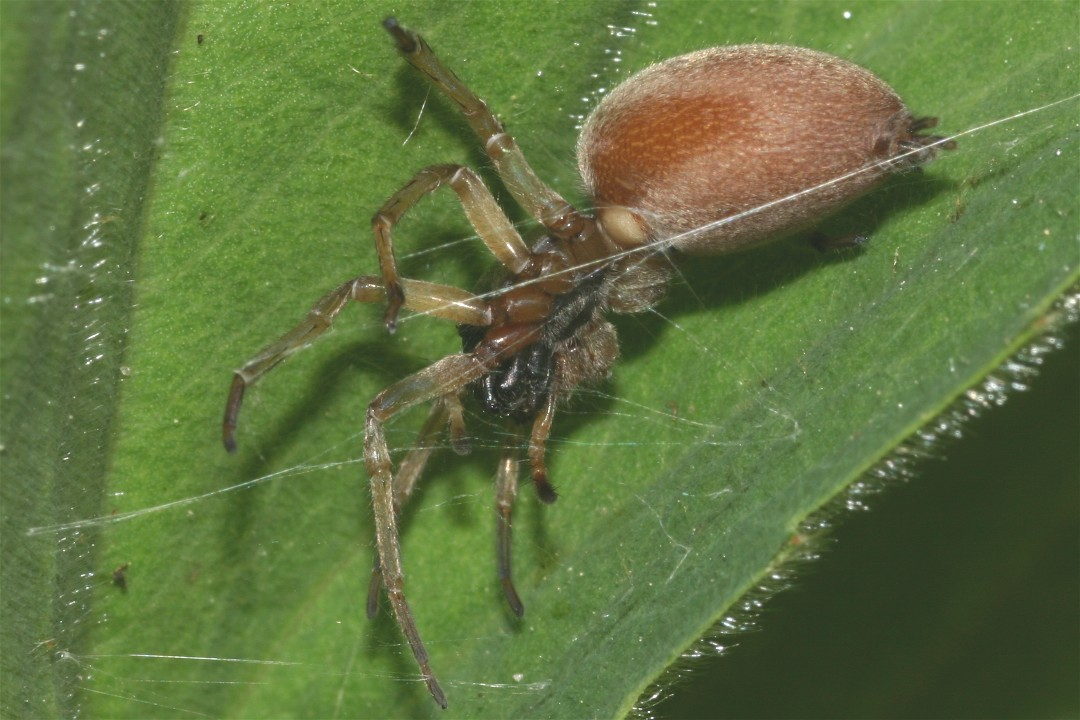
- Clubiona trivialis

Scientific classification
- Kingdom: Animalia
- Phylum: Arthropoda
- Subphylum: Chelicerata
- Class: Arachnida
- Order: Araneae
- Infraorder: Araneomorphae
- Family: Clubionidae; Simon, 1878

Diversity
- 18 genera, 678 species
- blue: reported countries (WSC) green: observation hotspots (iNaturalist)

= Sac spider =

Sac spider Temporal range: Palaeogene–present

Family of spiders

The sac spiders of the family Clubionidae (Note: the term "sac spider" is also part of the common name of various non-clubionid spiders—such as yellow sac spiders (Cheiracanthiidae) or corinnid sac spiders (Corinnidae)—many of which were formerly included in Clubionidae) are nocturnal, sac-building hunting spiders with a near-worldwide distribution. Their sacs, silken retreats in which they hide during the day, may be made in a variety of places, including between folded leaves or grass blades, under bark and below rocks or other ground litter.

Although formerly a much larger catch-all taxon, in its current definition the family contains fewer than 700 described species across 18 genera, of which Clubiona is by far most species-rich, with 528 accepted species as of November 2024.

== Taxonomy ==
The Clubionidae have a complex taxonomic history. Historically, the family was a large catch-all taxon for a variety of spiders that shared the following morphological and behavioral similarities: having eight eyes arranged in two rows; having conical anterior spinnerets that touched; and being nocturnal wandering predators that build "sacs" to retreat to during the day.

A large number of genera have been transferred from Clubionidae to other families, and several former subfamilies of the Clubionidae are now treated as separate families. The Zoropsidae, to which genera Anachemmis, Lauricius and Liocranoides were transferred, is much more closely related to the lynx spiders of family Oxyopidae than to the remaining Clubionidae.

According to 2023 cladistic research by Siddharth Kulkarni, Hannah M. Wood and Gustavo Hormiga, the remaining Clubionidae remain polyphyletic as a result of the current placement of genus Elaver.

== Genera ==
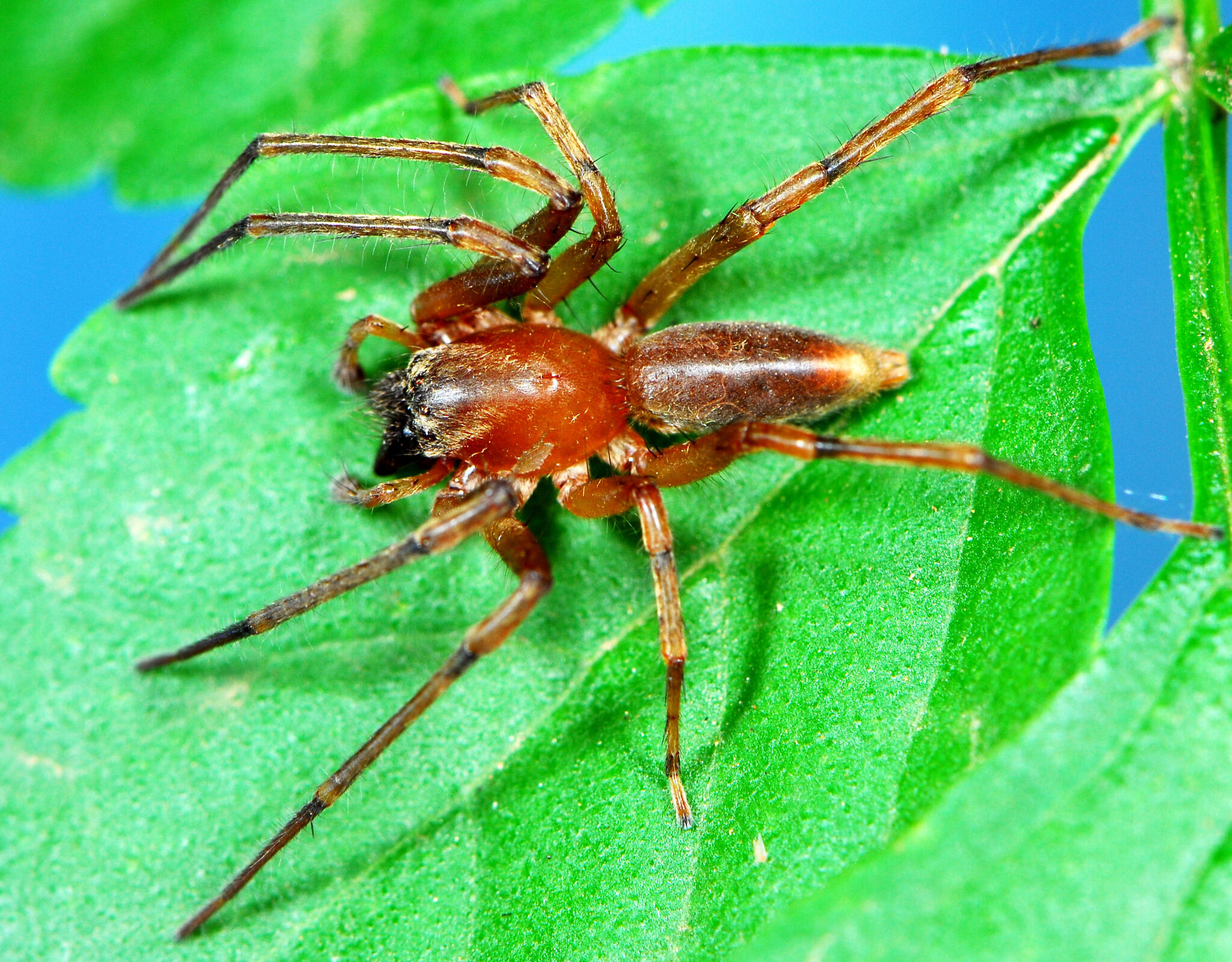
male Clubiona durbana

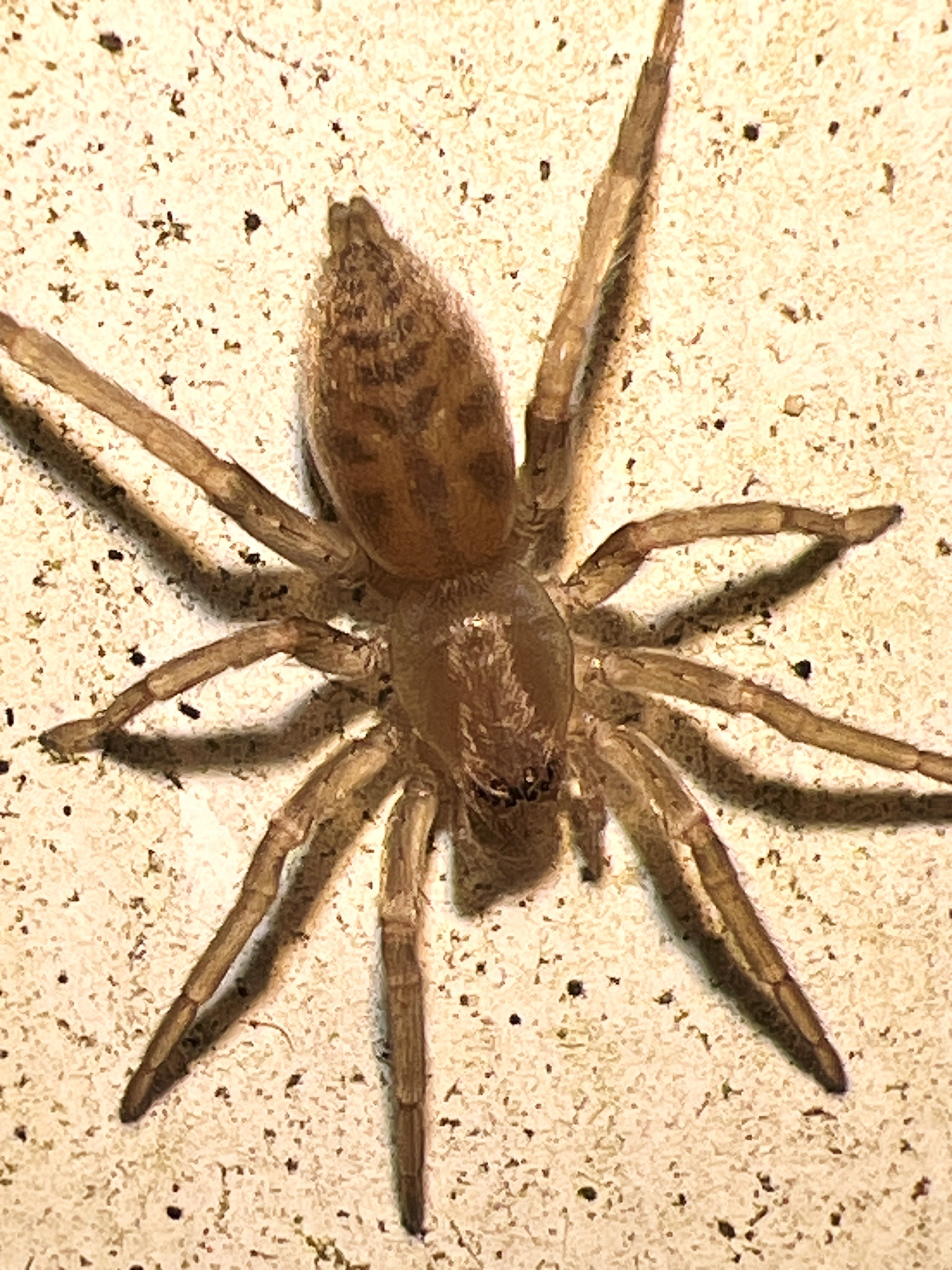
Elaver excepta

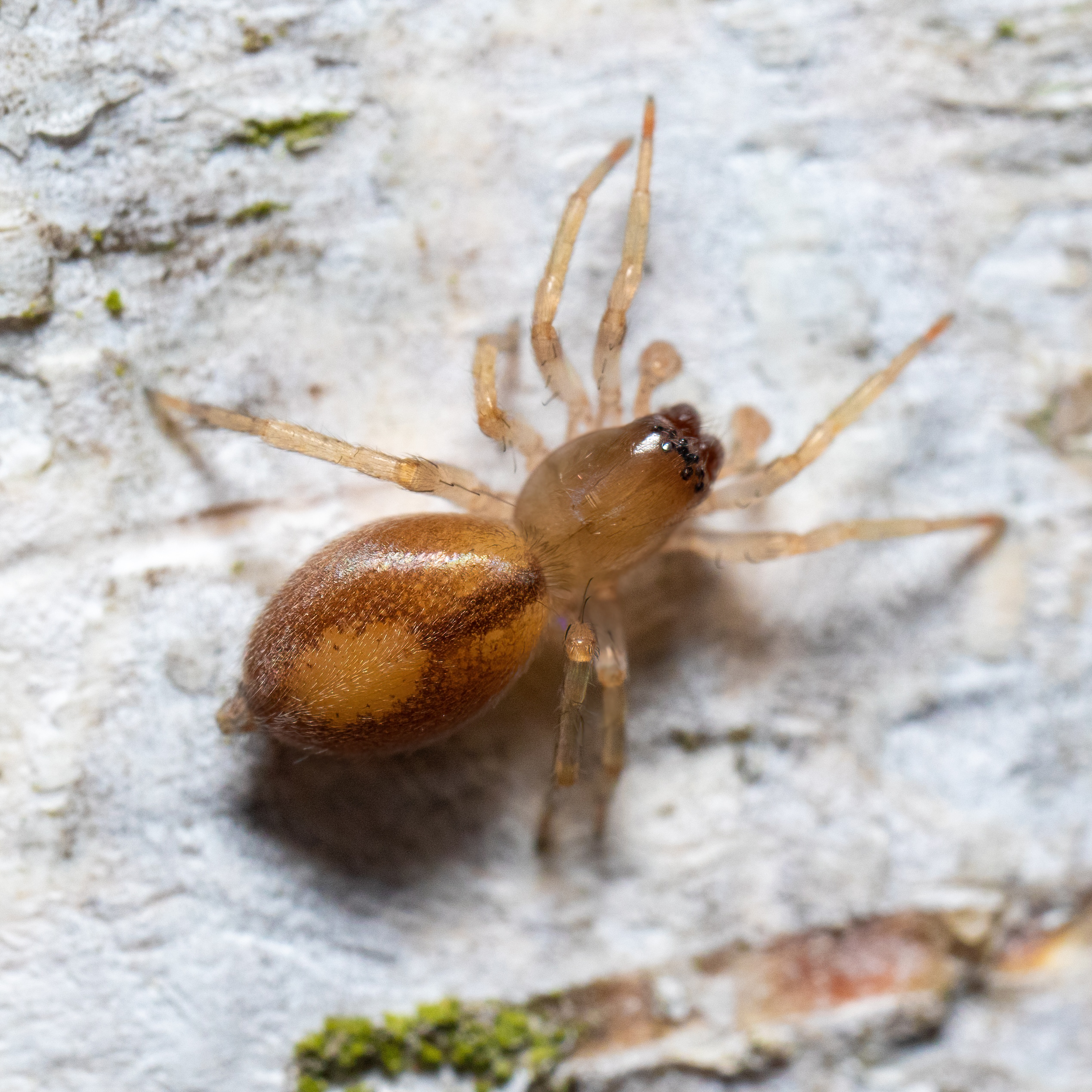
Porrhoclubiona leucaspis

As of January 2026, this family includes eighteen genera and 678 species:

- Arabellata Baert, Versteirt & Jocqué, 2010 – Papua New Guinea
- Bucliona Benoit, 1977 – Kenya, St. Helena, Eastern Asia, Russia
- Clubiona Latreille, 1804 – Africa, Asia, Europe, North America, Oceania, Chile, Guyana
- Clubionina Berland, 1947 – Île Saint-Paul
- Elaver O. Pickard-Cambridge, 1898 – North America, South America
- Femorbiona Yu & Li, 2021 – China, Vietnam
- Invexillata Versteirt, Baert & Jocqué, 2010 – Papua New Guinea
- Malamatidia Deeleman-Reinhold, 2001 – China, Indonesia, Laos, Malaysia
- Matidia Thorell, 1878 – Asia, New Guinea
- Nusatidia Deeleman-Reinhold, 2001 – China, Southeast Asia, Sri Lanka, Borneo
- Porrhoclubiona Lohmander, 1944 – Asia, Europe, North Africa
- Pristidia Deeleman-Reinhold, 2001 – China, Taiwan, Indonesia, Malaysia, Thailand
- Pteroneta Deeleman-Reinhold, 2001 – China, Japan, Southeast Asia, Australia, New Guinea
- Ramosatidia Yu & Li, 2021 – China
- Scopalio Deeleman-Reinhold, 2001 – Borneo
- Simalio Simon, 1897 – Philippines, India, Sri Lanka, Trinidad
- Sinostidia Yu & Li, 2021 – China
- Tixcocoba Gertsch, 1977 – Mexico

Additionally, the World Spider Catalog considers Carteroniella Strand, 1907 to be a nomen dubium.
