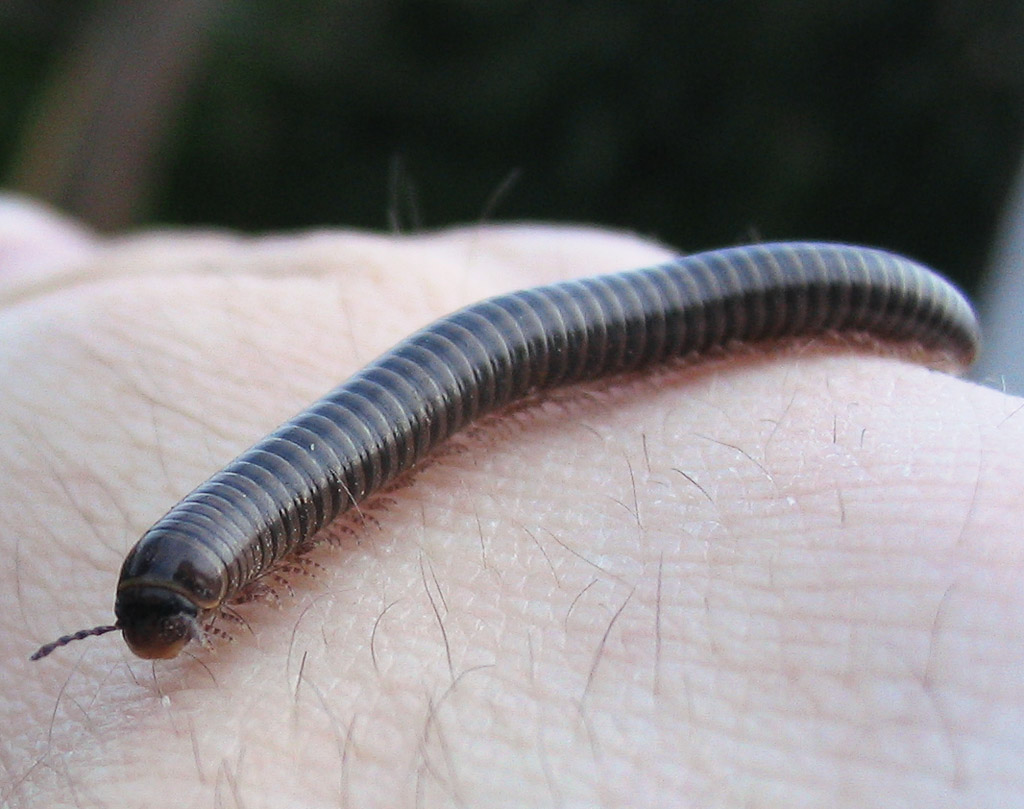

Scientific classification
- Kingdom: Animalia
- Phylum: Arthropoda
- Subphylum: Myriapoda
- Class: Diplopoda
- Order: Julida
- Family: Julidae
- Genus: Cylindroiulus
- Species: C. caeruleocinctus

Binomial name
- Cylindroiulus caeruleocinctus (Wood, 1864)

Synonyms
- Cylindroiulus teutonicus (Pocock, 1900)

= Cylindroiulus caeruleocinctus =

Species of millipede

Cylindroiulus caeruleocinctus is a species of millipede in the family Julidae. It is native to northern Europe and has been introduced to North America where it is now widespread.

== Description ==
Cylindroiulus caeruleocinctus has a cylindrical body shape with multiple segments that are characteristic of millipedes. It is dark, brown, or bronze and has a darker or blue band on each segment.

C. caeruleocinctus is a larger millipede being up to 30 mm long when fully grown. It has bean shaped eyes. Its telson (the final segment of its body) is smooth and flat instead of projecting outward.

== Distribution ==
Most commonly found in Germany, the UK, Sweden, and Switzerland. This species also appears in Canada, Norway, Luxembourg, the US, the Netherlands, and France.

Often found in grassland, hedges, small woods, rarely in forests. Large populations have been found in urban areas. Common in parks, gardens, and cemeteries. It may be found under wet leaves in parks and beside rivers in towns. Its preferred foods have been found to be broadleaves, followed by grass and moss. There are records of this species being an agricultural pest.

The sightings and activity of this species rises significantly in the spring and fall and drops significantly in the summer and winter.

== Similar Species ==
Cylindroiulus caeruleocinctus is most likely to be confused with Cylindroiulus londinensis, which is larger and has a club-shaped protruding telson.

Other dark millipedes of similar size, such as Julus scandinavius or Tachypodoiulus niger have a pointed telson.

Similar species that lack a projecting telson, such as Cylindroiulus britannicus, are much smaller than C. caeruleocinctus (less than 20 mm long).

== Gallery ==
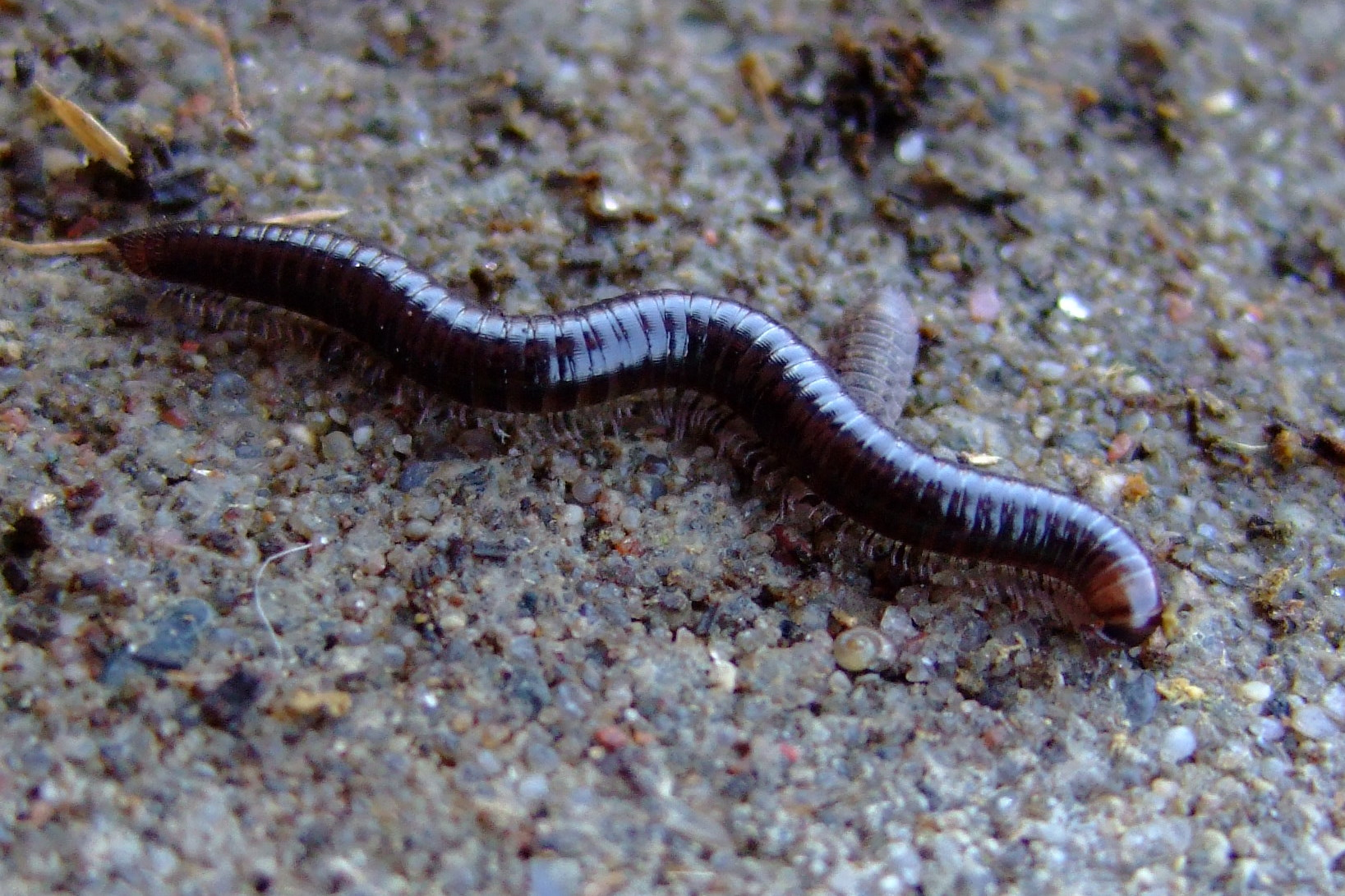

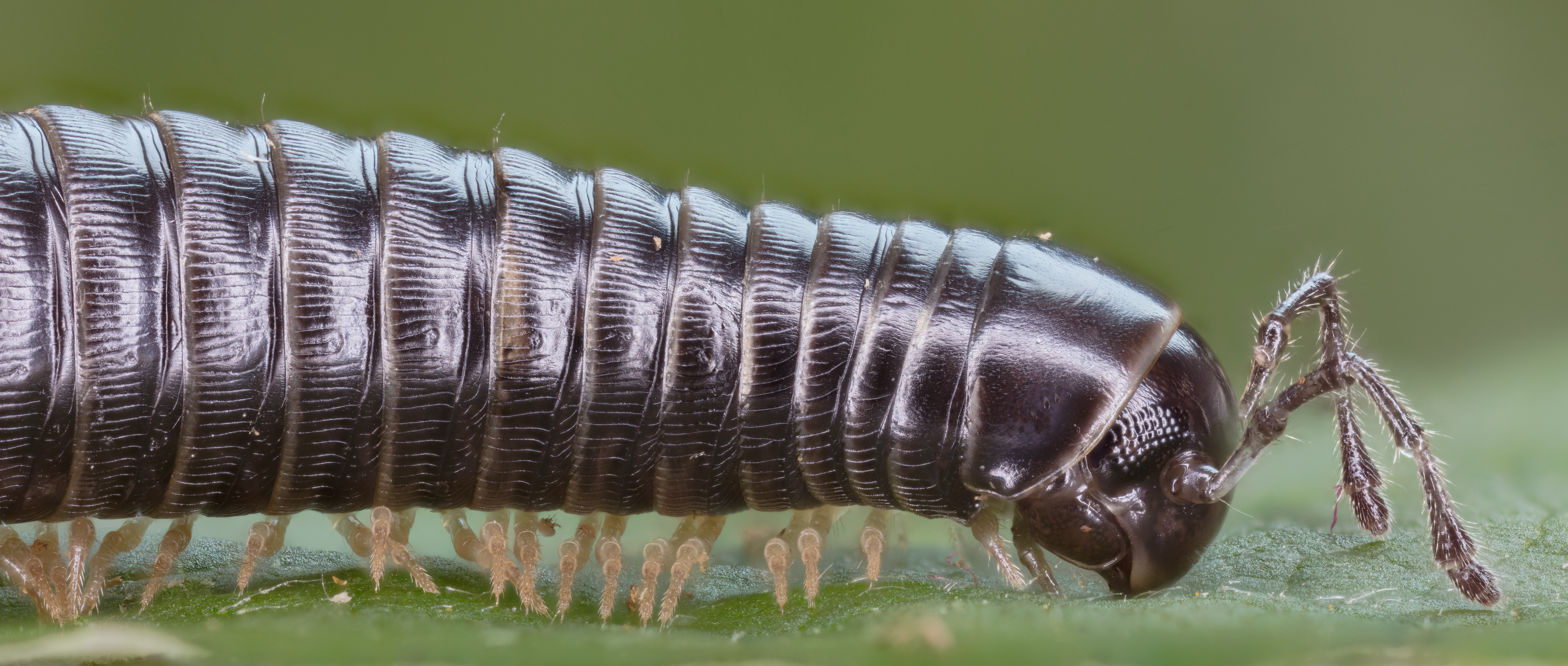

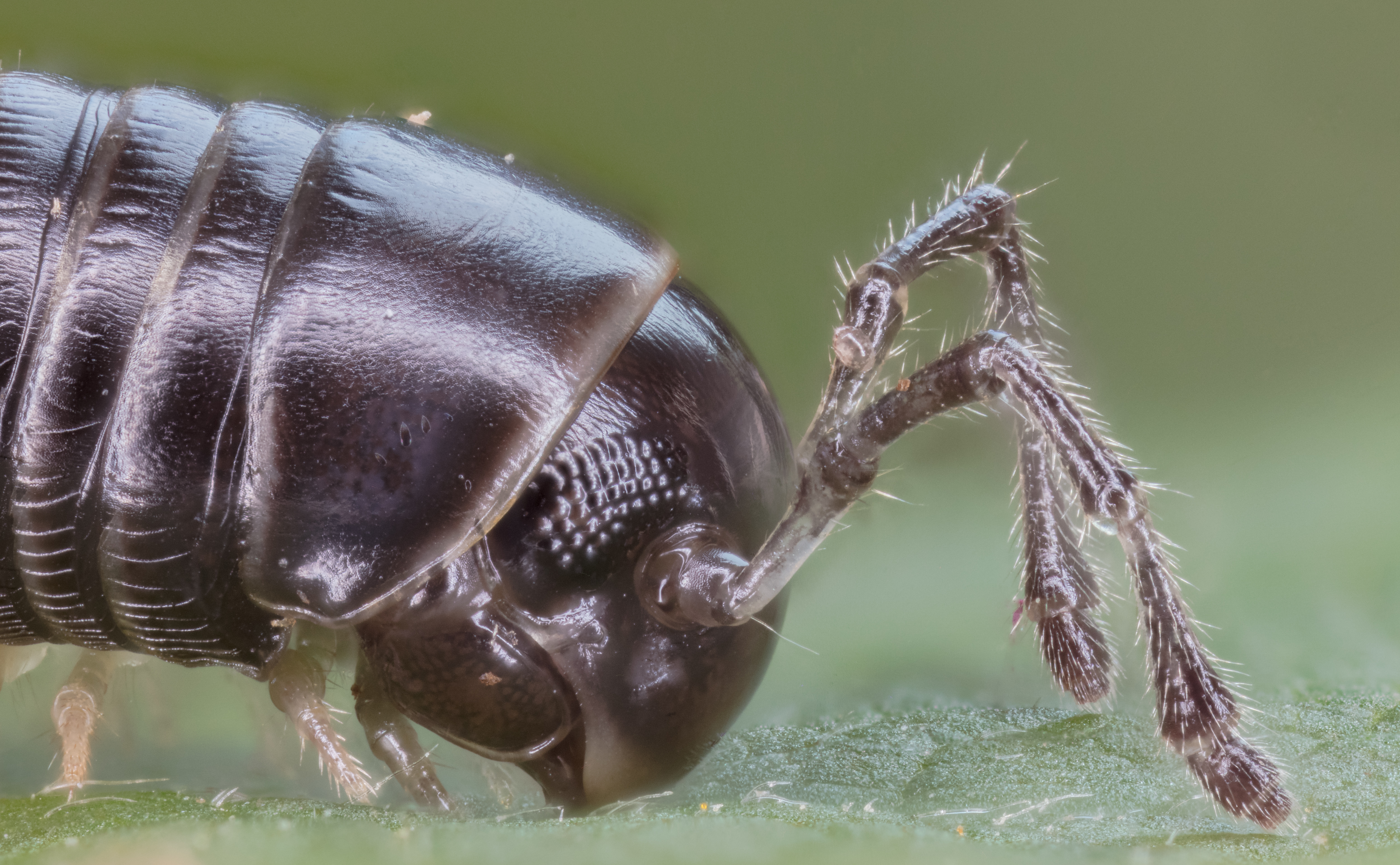

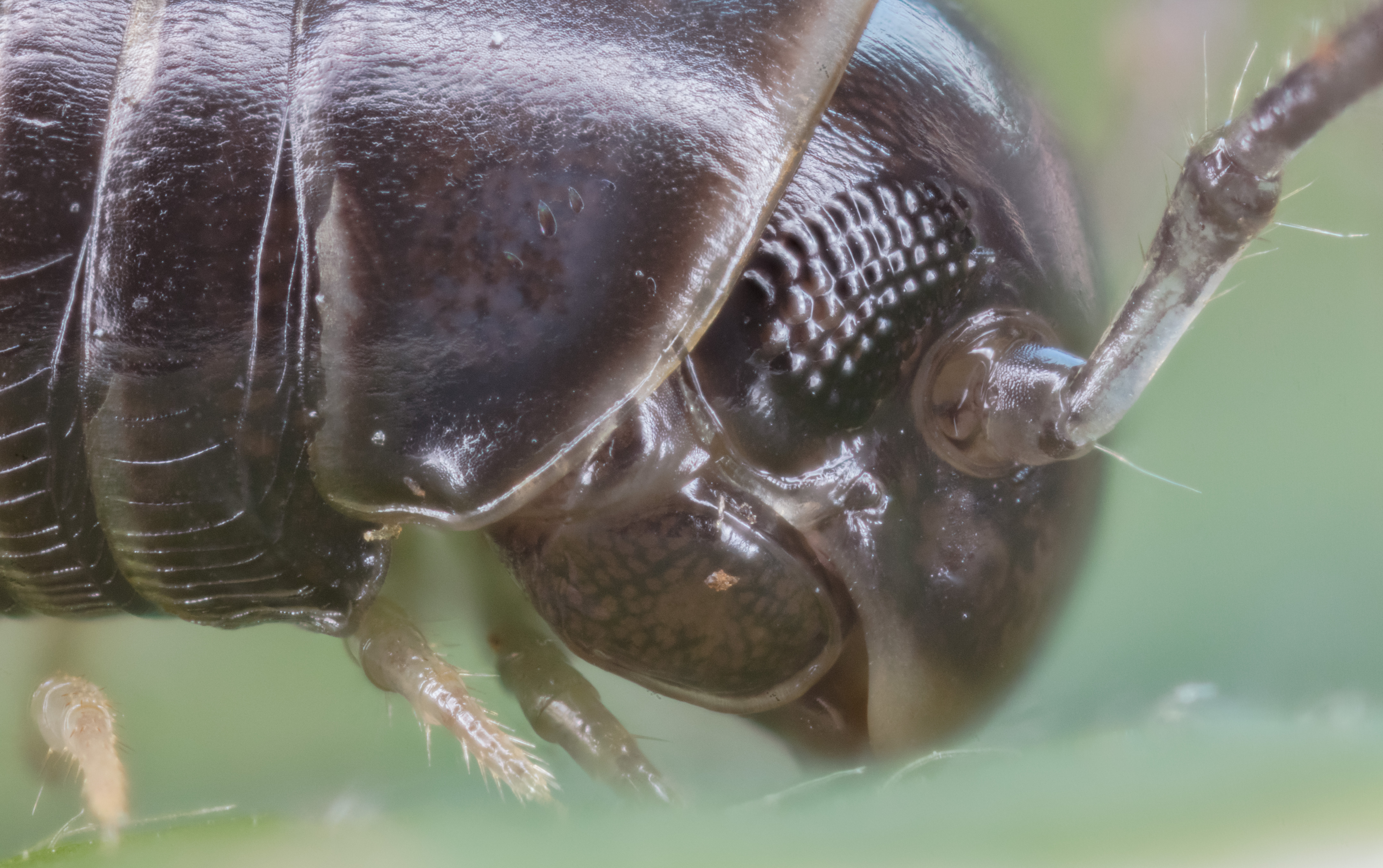

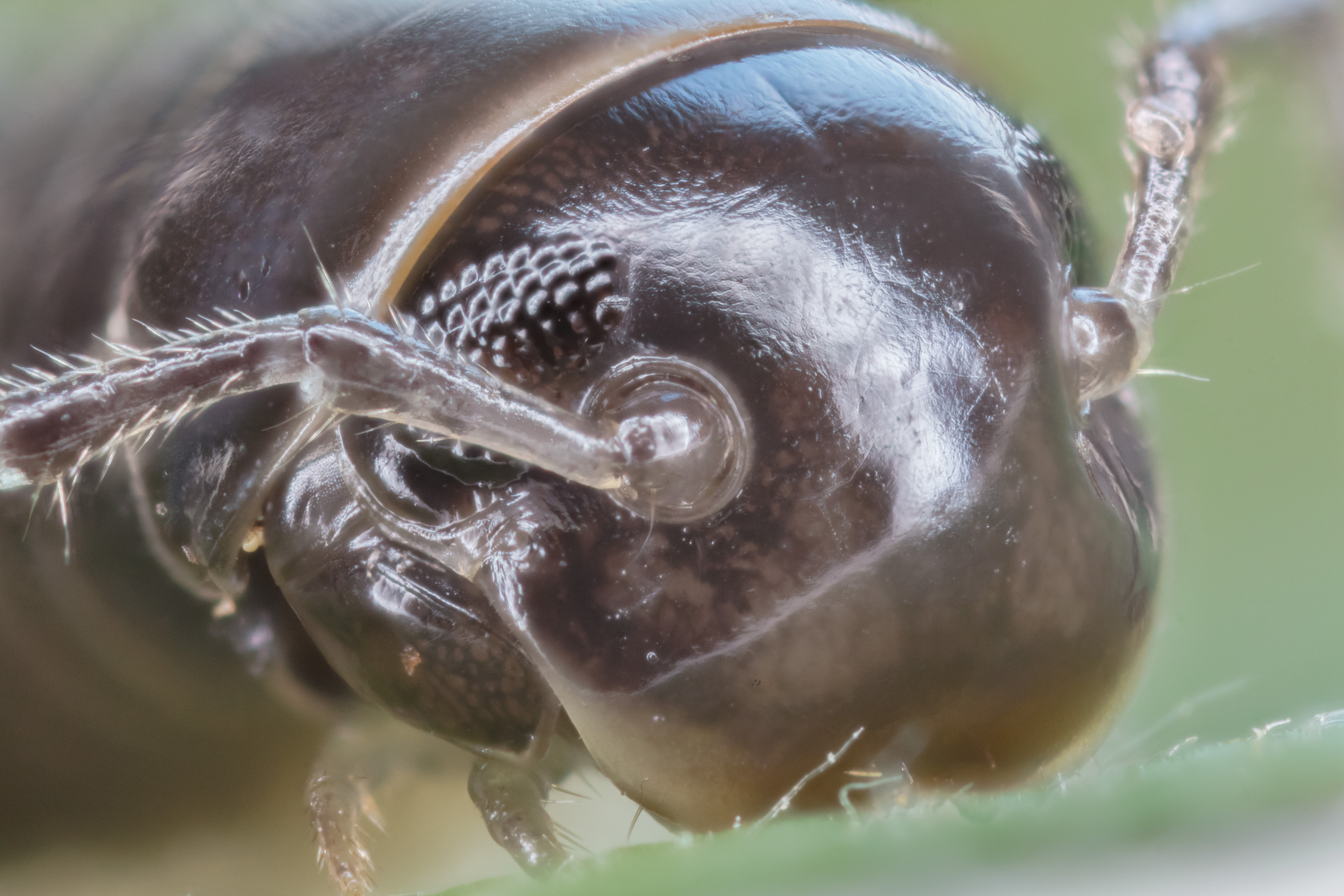

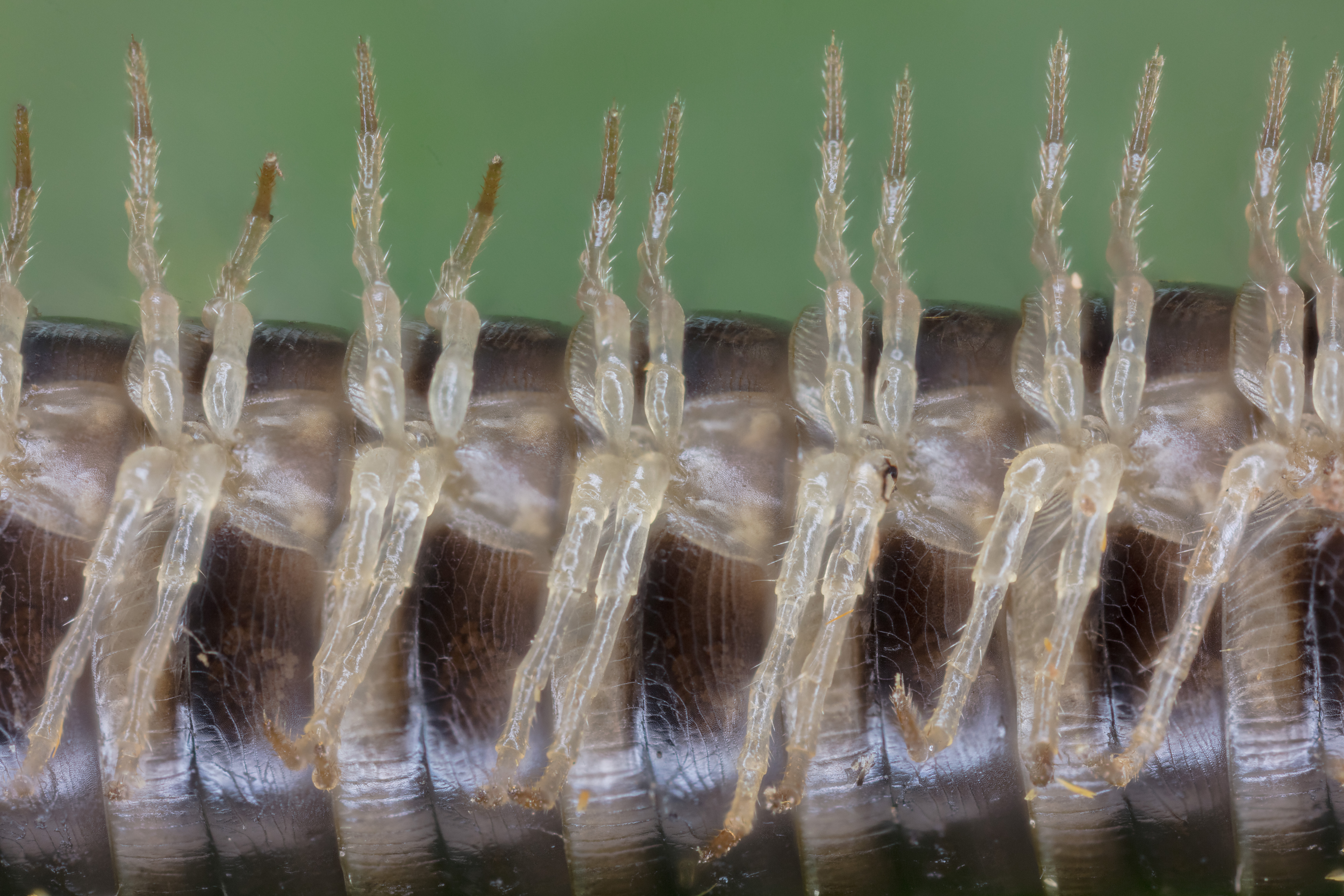
