= Buchneria =

Buchneria may refer to:

- Buchneria (millipede), a genus of millipedes in the family Julidae
- Buchneria, a fossil genus of mammals in the family Ochotonidae, synonym of Ochotona
- Buchneria, a genus of foraminifers in the family Ellipsolagenidae, synonym of Sipholagena
