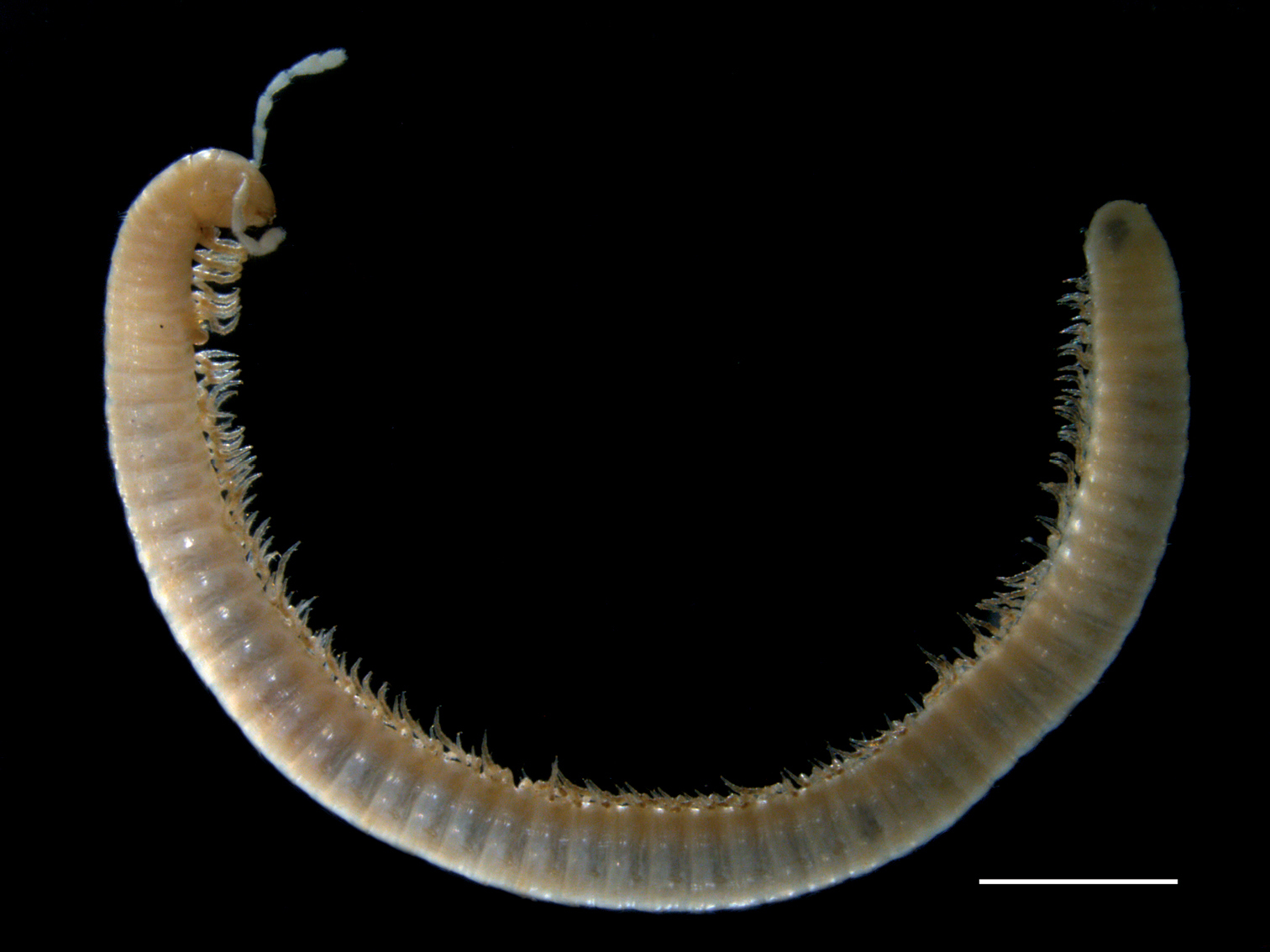

Scientific classification
- Kingdom: Animalia
- Phylum: Arthropoda
- Subphylum: Myriapoda
- Class: Diplopoda
- Order: Julida
- Family: Julidae
- Genus: Titanophyllum; Akkari, Stoev, & Enghoff, 2011
- Species: T. spiliarum

Binomial name
- Titanophyllum spiliarum Akkari, Stoev, & Enghoff, 2011

= Titanophyllum =

Genus of millipedes

Titanophyllum spiliarum is a species of cave-dwelling millipede in the family Julidae and is the only known species of the genus Titanophyllum. It was described in 2011 from specimens discovered in a cave in Greece. It has several unusual characteristics including eyelessness and a small hook on its hind-most body section that may be involved in keeping the animal ‘locked’ when it coils-up defensively.

== Description ==
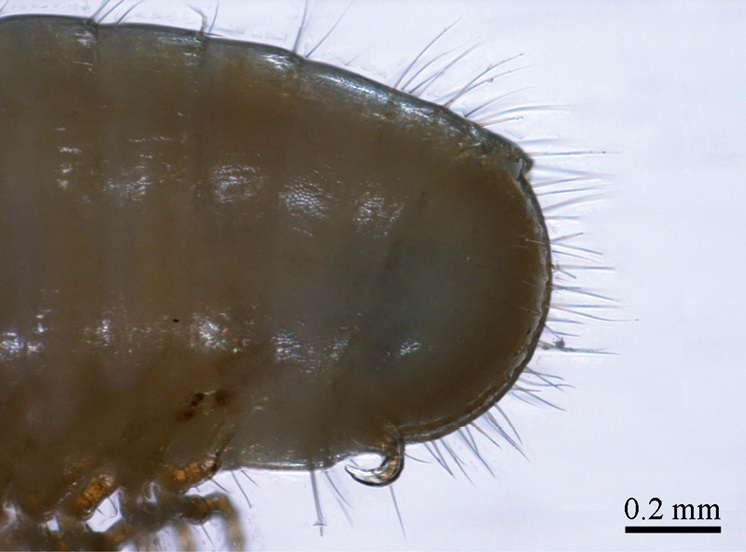
Titanophyllum spiliarum telson showing subanal hook (below)

Titanophyllum spiliarum specimens measure 17 – 33 mm in length and 1 to 1.4 mm wide. The pale yellow body consists of a head followed by 47–61 body segments with legs, 1–2 legless segments, ending in a telson (legless, last body segment). The walking legs are about 80% the body width. Eyes are absent. Like other members of the Julida, mature males have two pairs of highly modified legs, the gonopods, in place of the 8th and 9th pair of walking legs. Unusual among Julid millipedes, the telson possesses a small, forward-projecting hook on the hypoproct or subanal scale (the small plate below the anus). The function of the so-called “subanal hook” is unknown, but as it appears in both sexes and in juveniles, is thought to be related to survival rather than reproduction or attracting mates. Subanal hooks are known in only of few members of the Julidae, including species of Unciger, Syrioiulus, and Typhloiulus, and may aid in keeping the body in a defensive coil or spiral when threatened.

== Discovery ==
Titanophyllum spiliarum was described from several specimens originally collected from a cave in Magnesia, Greece in 2003. It was described as a new genus and species in 2011 by a team of Danish and Bulgarian scientists.

== Etymology ==
The genus name Titanophyllum derives from to the name of the cave where the species was discovered (Titanospilia, “the cave of Titans”), and φύλλον (phúllon), meaning "leaf", a reference to the leaf-shaped posterior gonopods. The species name means “of the caves” in Greek.

== See also ==
- Mammamia, another European cave-dwelling millipede described along with Titanophyllum
- Trichopetalum whitei, a North American cave-dwelling millipede
