= Brachyiulus apfelbecki =

Scientific classification
- Kingdom: Animalia
- Phylum: Arthropoda
- Subphylum: Myriapoda
- Class: Diplopoda
- Order: Julida
- Family: Julidae
- Genus: Brachyiulus
- Species: B. apfelbecki

Binomial name
- Brachyiulus apfelbecki (Verhoeff, 1898)

Species of myriapod

Brachyiulus apfelbecki is a species of millipede in the family Julidae. It is endemic to Bulgaria.
