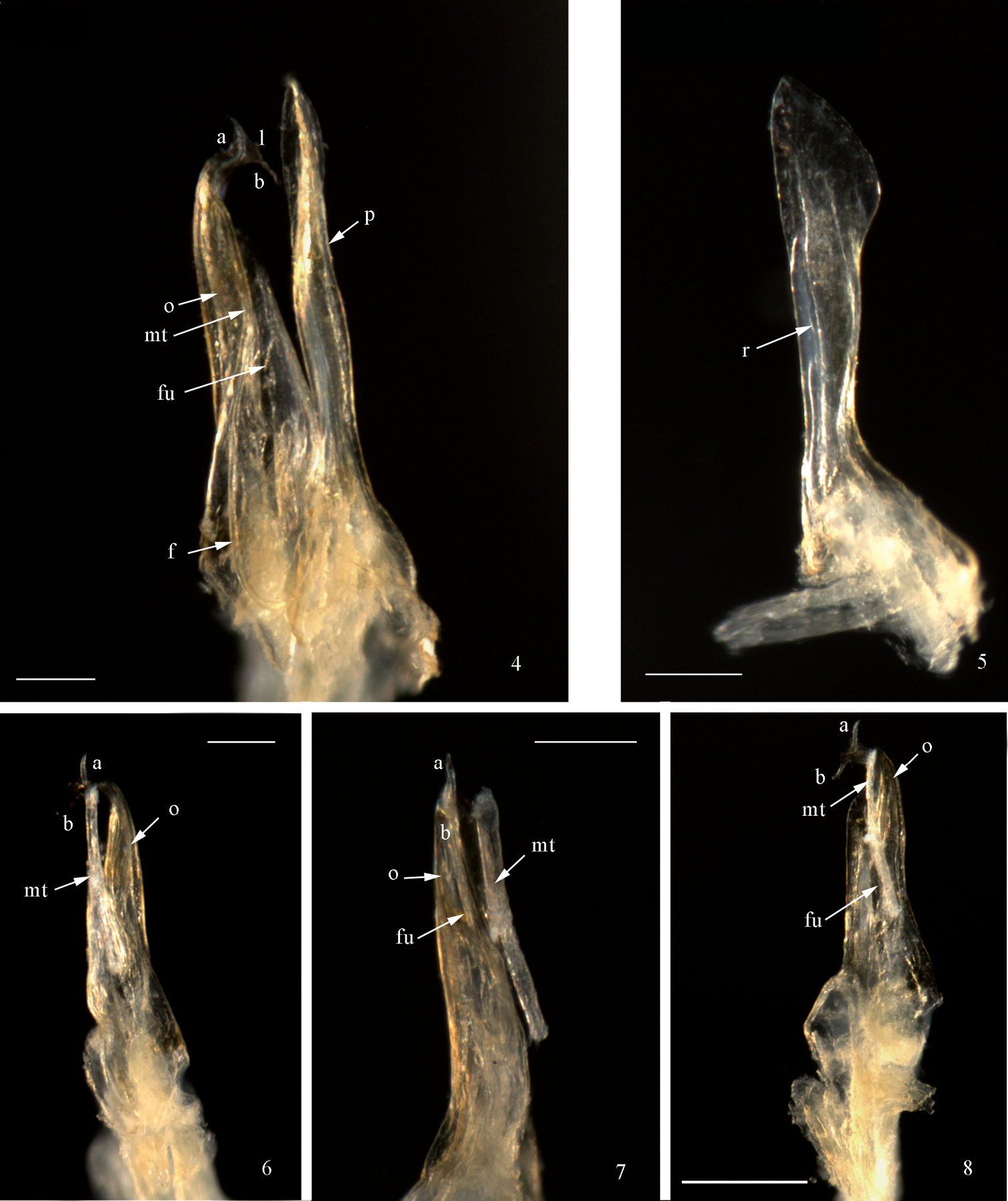
- The gonopods of M. profuga

Scientific classification
- Kingdom: Animalia
- Phylum: Arthropoda
- Subphylum: Myriapoda
- Class: Diplopoda
- Order: Julida
- Family: Julidae
- Genus: Mammamia; Akkari, Stoev, & Enghoff, 2011

Type species
- Mammamia profuga Akkari, Stoev, & Enghoff, 2011

= Mammamia =

Genus of millipedes

Mammamia profuga is a species of cave-dwelling millipede in the family Julidae. The only known species of the genus Mammamia, it was described in 2011 from a specimen discovered in a cave in Italy.

== Description ==
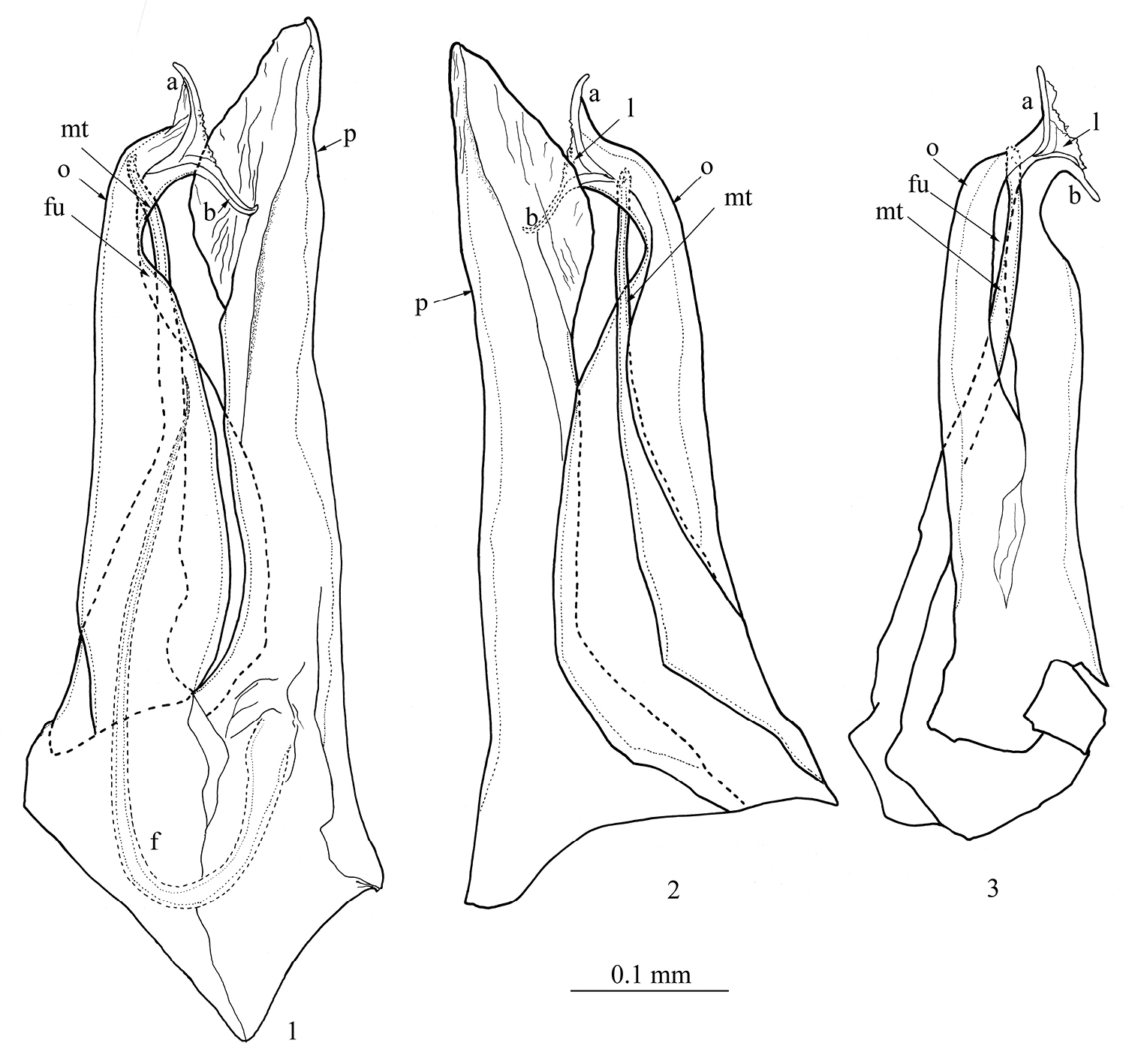

Mammamia profuga measures about 26 mm (1 inch) long, and 1.5 mm wide, consisting of around 50 body segments, the last two without legs. The body and legs are pale yellow in color, without markings, and the walking legs are about 2.25 mm long, except for the first pair in males, which are small and hook-like, as in other julidan millipedes. The species completely lacks eyes or ocelli. Like all members of the order Julida, mature males have two pairs of highly modified legs, the gonopods, consisting of the 8th and 9th pair, and in Mammamia the anterior (forward-most) gonopods are slightly longer than the posterior gonopods.

== Discovery ==
Mammamia profuga was described from a single male specimen collected from a cave in Taranto Province, Italy in 1964. It was described as a new genus and species in 2011 by a team of Danish and Bulgarian scientists.

== Etymology ==
The genus name Mammamia derives from the Italian expression "Mamma mia!" in reference to the "astonishing" features, including eyelessness and unique feature of the gonopods. The species name profuga is Latin for "homeless" or "refugee", a reference to the fact that the cave the species was discovered in was subsequently destroyed.

== See also ==
- Titanophyllum, another European cave-dwelling millipede described along with Mammamia
- Trichopetalum whitei, a North American cave-dwelling millipede
