= Pachyiulus speciosus =

Scientific classification
- Kingdom: Animalia
- Phylum: Arthropoda
- Subphylum: Myriapoda
- Class: Diplopoda
- Order: Julida
- Family: Julidae
- Genus: Pachyiulus
- Species: P. speciosus

Binomial name
- Pachyiulus speciosus Verhoeff, 1900

Species of millipede

Pachyiulus speciosus is a species of millipede from Julidae family that is endemic to Greece.
