= Brachyiulus stuxbergi =

Scientific classification
- Kingdom: Animalia
- Phylum: Arthropoda
- Subphylum: Myriapoda
- Class: Diplopoda
- Order: Julida
- Family: Julidae
- Genus: Brachyiulus
- Species: B. stuxbergi

Binomial name
- Brachyiulus stuxbergi (Fanzago, 1875)

Species of millipede

Brachyiulus stuxbergi is a species of millipede in the genus Brachyiulus. It is endemic to Malta, specifically Gozo, and central to southern Italy including Sicily and the Aegadian Islands. Outside Italy, it is found in Tunisia, Algeria, and Greece.
