= Pachyiulus cattarensis =

Scientific classification
- Kingdom: Animalia
- Phylum: Arthropoda
- Subphylum: Myriapoda
- Class: Diplopoda
- Order: Julida
- Family: Julidae
- Genus: Pachyiulus
- Species: P. cattarensis

Binomial name
- Pachyiulus cattarensis (Latzel, 1884)

Synonyms
- Iulus cattarensis Latzel, 1884; Pachyiulus venetus Verhoeff, 1926; Pachyiulus longelobulatus Attems, 1902

Species of millipede

Pachyiulus cattarensis is a species of millipede from Julidae family that can be found in Bulgaria, Greece and all states of former Yugoslavia (except Slovenia).
