= Brachyiulus varibolinus =

Scientific classification
- Kingdom: Animalia
- Phylum: Arthropoda
- Subphylum: Myriapoda
- Class: Diplopoda
- Order: Julida
- Family: Julidae
- Genus: Brachyiulus
- Species: B. varibolinus

Binomial name
- Brachyiulus varibolinus Attems, 1904

Synonyms
- Brachyiulus beratinus Manfredi, 1945

Species of millipede

Brachyiulus varibolinus is a species of millipede in the family Julidae. It is endemic to the Balkans and is known from Albania and Greece.
