= Brachyiulus jawlowskii =

Scientific classification
- Kingdom: Animalia
- Phylum: Arthropoda
- Subphylum: Myriapoda
- Class: Diplopoda
- Order: Julida
- Family: Julidae
- Genus: Brachyiulus
- Species: B. jawlowskii

Binomial name
- Brachyiulus jawlowskii (Lohmander, 1928)

Species of millipede

Brachyiulus jawlowskii is a species of millipede in the genus Brachyiulus. It is endemic to Turkey.
