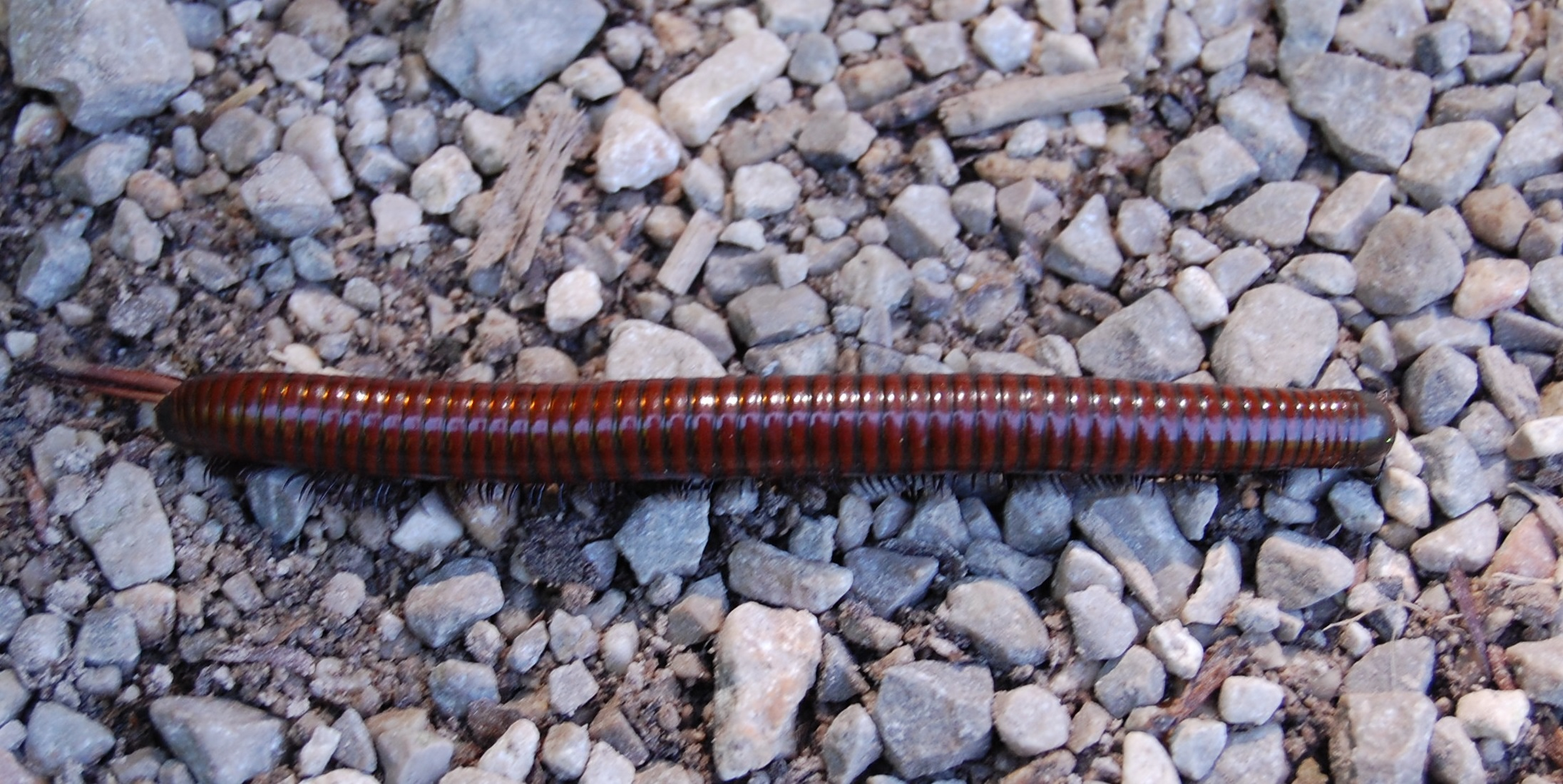
- P. hungaricus in Croatia's Plitvice Lakes National Park

Scientific classification
- Kingdom: Animalia
- Phylum: Arthropoda
- Subphylum: Myriapoda
- Class: Diplopoda
- Order: Julida
- Family: Julidae
- Genus: Pachyiulus
- Species: P. hungaricus

Binomial name
- Pachyiulus hungaricus (Karsch, 1881)

Synonyms
- Julus hungaricus Karsch, 1881; Pachyiulus gracilis Verhoeff, 1928

= Pachyiulus hungaricus =

Species of millipede

Pachyiulus hungaricus is a species of millipede from Julidae family that can be found in Albania, Bulgaria, Greece, Romania, and all states of former Yugoslavia (except for Slovenia).
