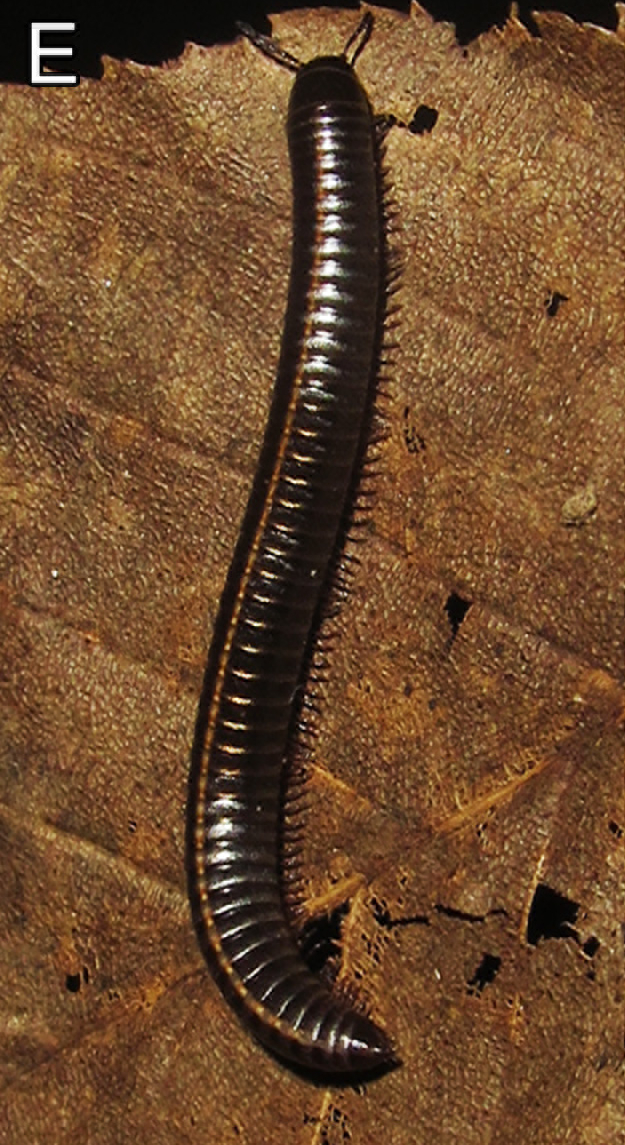

Scientific classification
- Kingdom: Animalia
- Phylum: Arthropoda
- Subphylum: Myriapoda
- Class: Diplopoda
- Order: Julida
- Family: Julidae
- Genus: Megaphyllum
- Species: M. unilineatum

Binomial name
- Megaphyllum unilineatum (C. L. Koch, 1838)

= Megaphyllum unilineatum =

Species of millipede

Megaphyllum unilineatum is a species of millipede in the family Julidae, first described by Carl Ludwig Koch in 1838. No subspecies are listed in the Catalogue of Life.
