= Brachyiulus klisurensis =

Scientific classification
- Kingdom: Animalia
- Phylum: Arthropoda
- Subphylum: Myriapoda
- Class: Diplopoda
- Order: Julida
- Family: Julidae
- Genus: Brachyiulus
- Species: B. klisurensis

Binomial name
- Brachyiulus klisurensis (Verhoeff, 1903)

Species of millipede

Brachyiulus klisurensis is a species of millipede in the genus Brachyiulus. It was described by Karl Wilhelm Verhoeff in 1903.
