= Brachyiulus bagnalli =

Scientific classification
- Kingdom: Animalia
- Phylum: Arthropoda
- Subphylum: Myriapoda
- Class: Diplopoda
- Order: Julida
- Family: Julidae
- Genus: Brachyiulus
- Species: B. bagnalli

Binomial name
- Brachyiulus bagnalli (Brolemann, 1924)

Species of millipede

Brachyiulus bagnalli is a species of millipede in the genus Brachyiulus. It is endemic to Bulgaria.
