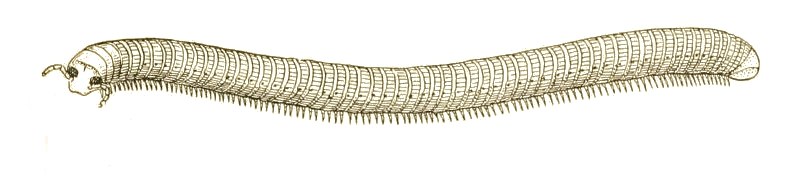

Scientific classification
- Kingdom: Animalia
- Phylum: Arthropoda
- Subphylum: Myriapoda
- Class: Diplopoda
- Order: Julida
- Family: Julidae
- Genus: Pachyiulus
- Species: P. varius

Binomial name
- Pachyiulus varius (Fabricius, 1781)

Synonyms
- Iulus varius Fabricius, 1781; Pachyiulus apfelbecki Verhoeff, 1901; Pachyiulus aprutianus Verhoeff, 1930; Pachyiulus cephalonicus Attems, 1902; Pachyiulus ciminensis Verhoeff, 1930; Julus flavipes C. L. Koch, 1847; Julus insulanus L. Koch, 1881; Pachyiulus milesius Verhoeff, 1927; Julus nigripes C. L. Koch, 1847; Iulus oenologus Berlese, 1885; Pachyiulus olivarum Verhoeff, 1951; Pachyiulus pluto Verhoeff, 1910; Pachyiulus prominens Attems, 1939; Julus semiflavus C. L. Koch, 1847; Julus unicolor C. L. Koch, 1847

= Pachyiulus varius =

Species of millipede

Pachyiulus varius is a species of millipede from Julidae family that can be found in Bulgaria, France, Greece, Italy, Romania, all states of former Yugoslavia and various European islands.
