= Megaphyllum =

Megaphyllum may refer to:

- Megaphyllum (millipede), a genus of myriapods in the family Julidae
- Megaphyllum, a genus of flowering plants in the family Rubiaceae; synonym of Pentagonia
- Megaphyllum, a genus of cnidarians with unknown classification, described by Soshkina, 1939
