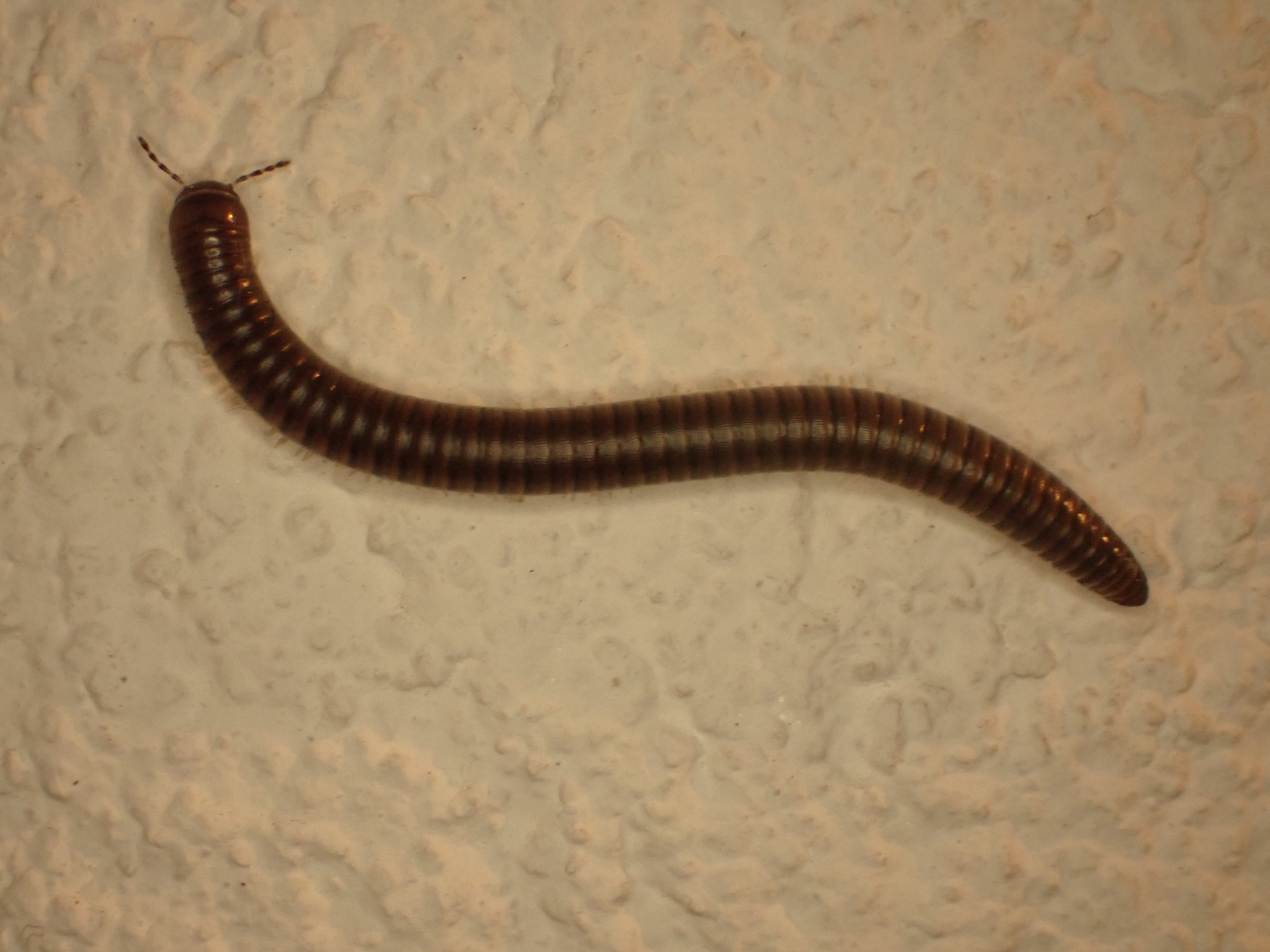

Scientific classification
- Kingdom: Animalia
- Phylum: Arthropoda
- Subphylum: Myriapoda
- Class: Diplopoda
- Order: Julida
- Family: Julidae
- Genus: Pachyiulus
- Species: P. asiaeminoris

Binomial name
- Pachyiulus asiaeminoris Verhoeff, 1898

= Pachyiulus asiaeminoris =

Species of millipede

Pachyiulus asiaeminoris is a species of millipede in the family Julidae. It was described by Karl Wilhelm Verhoeff in 1898 and is found on Crete and in the Near East.
