= Brachyiulus lusitanus =

Scientific classification
- Kingdom: Animalia
- Phylum: Arthropoda
- Subphylum: Myriapoda
- Class: Diplopoda
- Order: Julida
- Family: Julidae
- Genus: Brachyiulus
- Species: B. lusitanus

Binomial name
- Brachyiulus lusitanus (Verhoeff, 1898)

Species of millipede

Brachyiulus lusitanus is a species of millipede in the genus Brachyiulus. It is endemic to Bulgaria.

A case of pseudo-parasitism by this species has been recorded.
