= Pachyiulus dentiger =

Scientific classification
- Kingdom: Animalia
- Phylum: Arthropoda
- Subphylum: Myriapoda
- Class: Diplopoda
- Order: Julida
- Family: Julidae
- Genus: Pachyiulus
- Species: P. dentiger

Binomial name
- Pachyiulus dentiger Verhoeff, 1901

Species of millipede

Pachyiulus dentiger is a species of millipede from Julidae family that can be found in Albania and Greece.
