= Xestoiulus =

Scientific classification
- Kingdom: Animalia
- Phylum: Arthropoda
- Subphylum: Myriapoda
- Class: Diplopoda
- Order: Julida
- Family: Julidae
- Genus: Xestoiulus; Verhoeff, 1893

Genus of myriapods

Xestoiulus is a genus of millipedes belonging to the family Julidae.

The species of this genus are found in Central Europe.

Species:

- Xestoiulus bjelasnicensis (Verhoeff, 1898)
- Xestoiulus blaniuloides (Verhoeff, 1893)
