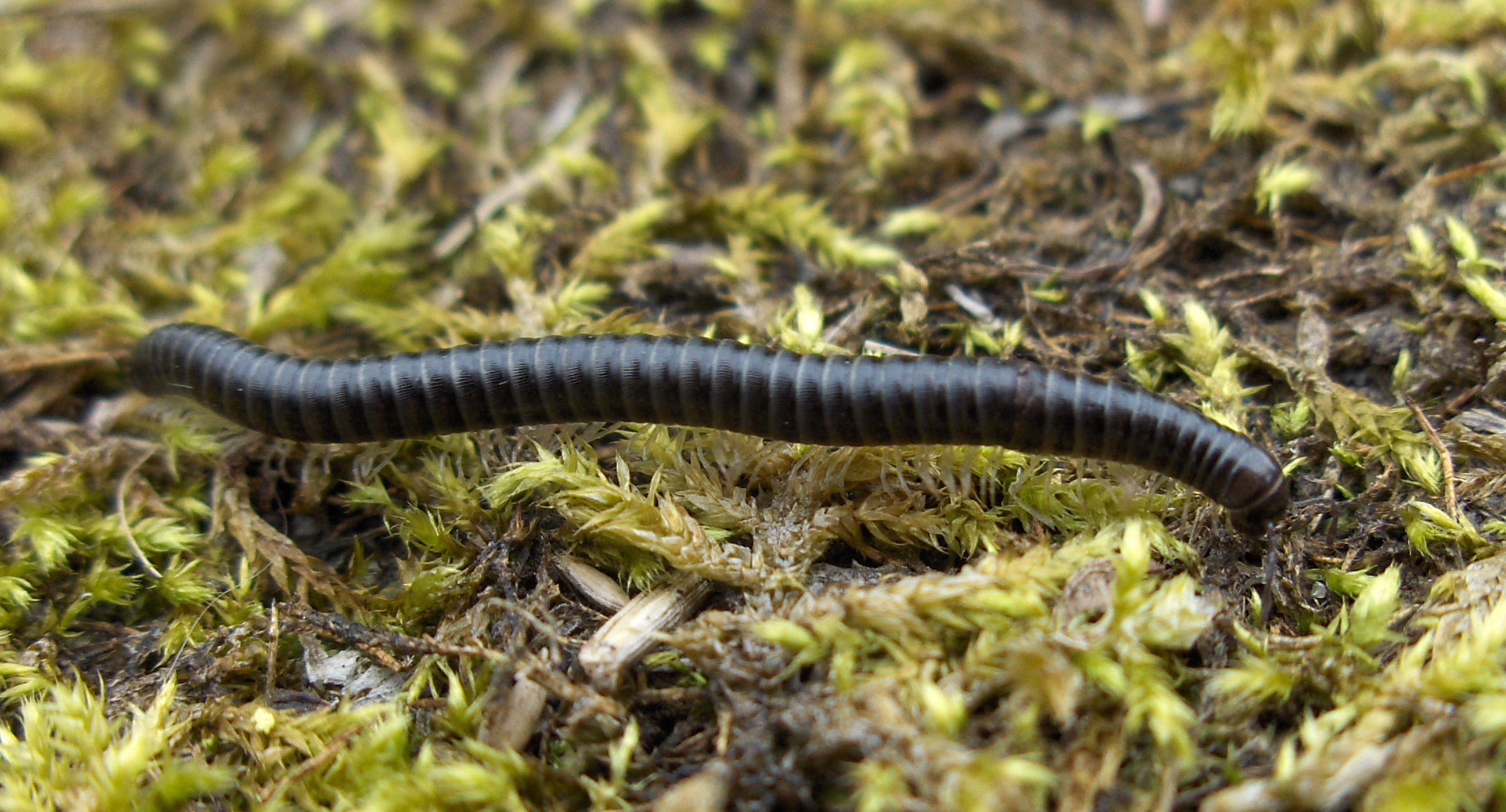
- Tachypodoiulus niger

Scientific classification
- Kingdom: Animalia
- Phylum: Arthropoda
- Subphylum: Myriapoda
- Class: Diplopoda
- Order: Julida
- Family: Julidae
- Genus: Tachypodoiulus

= Tachypodoiulus =

Genus of millipedes

Tachypodoiulus is a genus of millipedes within the family Julidae, which contains two species.

== Species ==
- Tachypodoiulus albipes (Koch, C. L., 1838)
- Tachypodoiulus niger (Leach, 1814)
