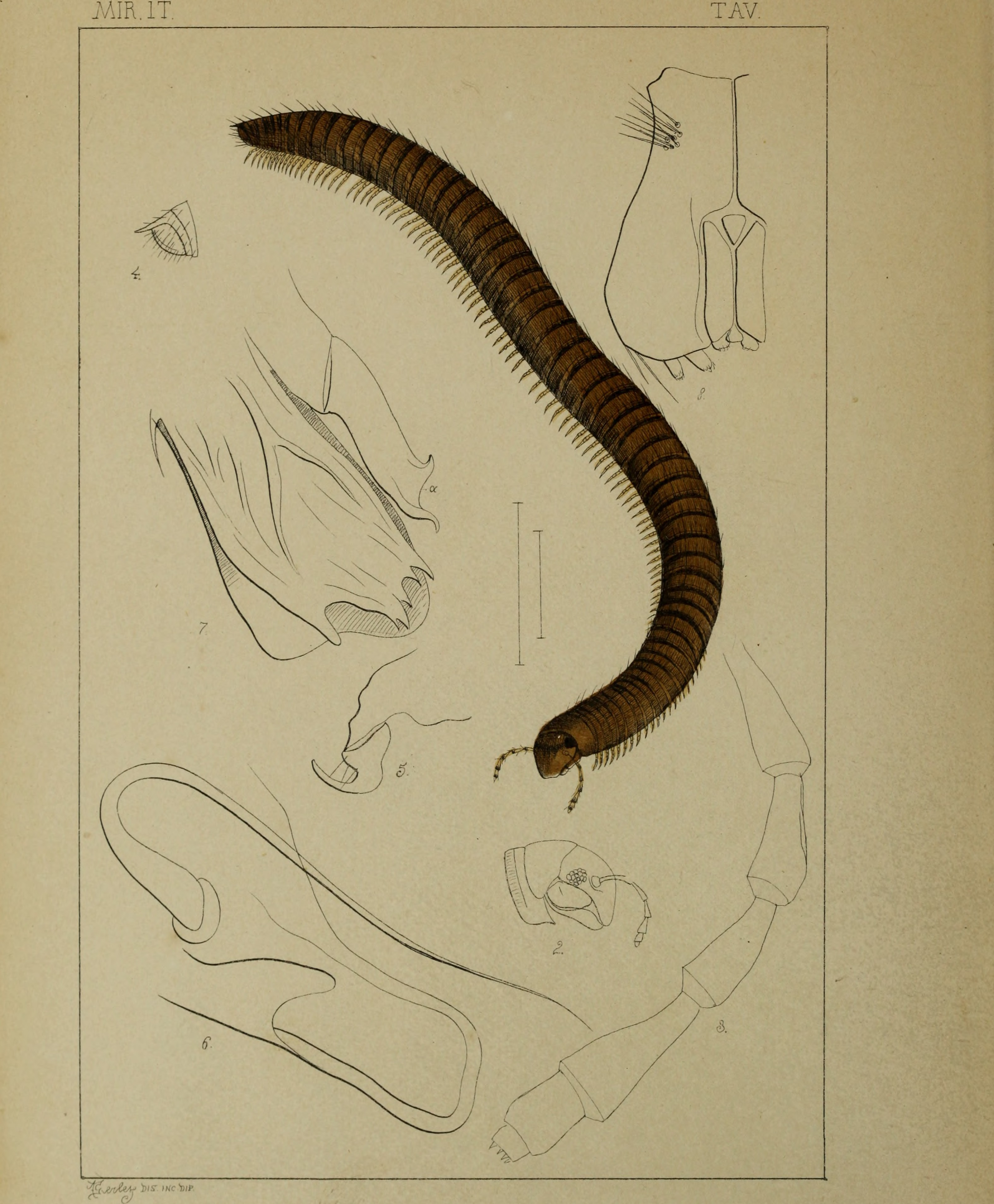

Scientific classification
- Kingdom: Animalia
- Phylum: Arthropoda
- Subphylum: Myriapoda
- Class: Diplopoda
- Order: Julida
- Family: Julidae
- Genus: Ophyiulus; Berlese, 1884

= Ophyiulus =

Genus of millipedes

Ophyiulus is a genus of millipedes in the family Julidae. There are more than 30 described species in Ophyiulus.

== Species ==
These 32 species belong to the genus Ophyiulus:

- Ophyiulus barbatus Verhoeff, 1908
- Ophyiulus bastiensis (Verhoeff, 1943)
- Ophyiulus castanearum Verhoeff, 1930
- Ophyiulus cerii Verhoeff, 1942
- Ophyiulus chilopogon (Latzel, 1884)
- Ophyiulus collaris (Verhoeff, 1930)
- Ophyiulus corsicus (Verhoeff, 1943)
- Ophyiulus curvipes (Verhoeff, 1898)
- Ophyiulus germanicus (Verhoeff, 1896)
- Ophyiulus glandulosus Verhoeff, 1910
- Ophyiulus italianus Attems, 1926
- Ophyiulus jeekeli Strasser, 1974
- Ophyiulus lostiae Silvestri, 1898
- Ophyiulus macchiae Verhoeff, 1930
- Ophyiulus major Bigler & Verhoeff, 1920
- Ophyiulus minimus Strasser, 1959
- Ophyiulus muelleri Strasser, 1937
- Ophyiulus napolitanus (Attems, 1903)
- Ophyiulus nigrofuscus (Verhoeff, 1894)
- Ophyiulus osellai Strasser, 1970
- Ophyiulus parellenicus Silvestri, 1896
- Ophyiulus pilosus (Newport, 1843)
- Ophyiulus renosensis Mauriès, 1969
- Ophyiulus rubrodorsalis (Verhoeff, 1901)
- Ophyiulus sardus Attems, 1926
- Ophyiulus solitarius Bigler, 1946
- Ophyiulus spezianus Verhoeff, 1936
- Ophyiulus strandi (Attems, 1927)
- Ophyiulus targionii Silvestri, 1898
- Ophyiulus terrestris (Berlese, 1884)
- Ophyiulus velebiticus Attems, 1927
- Ophyiulus verruculiger (Verhoeff, 1910)
