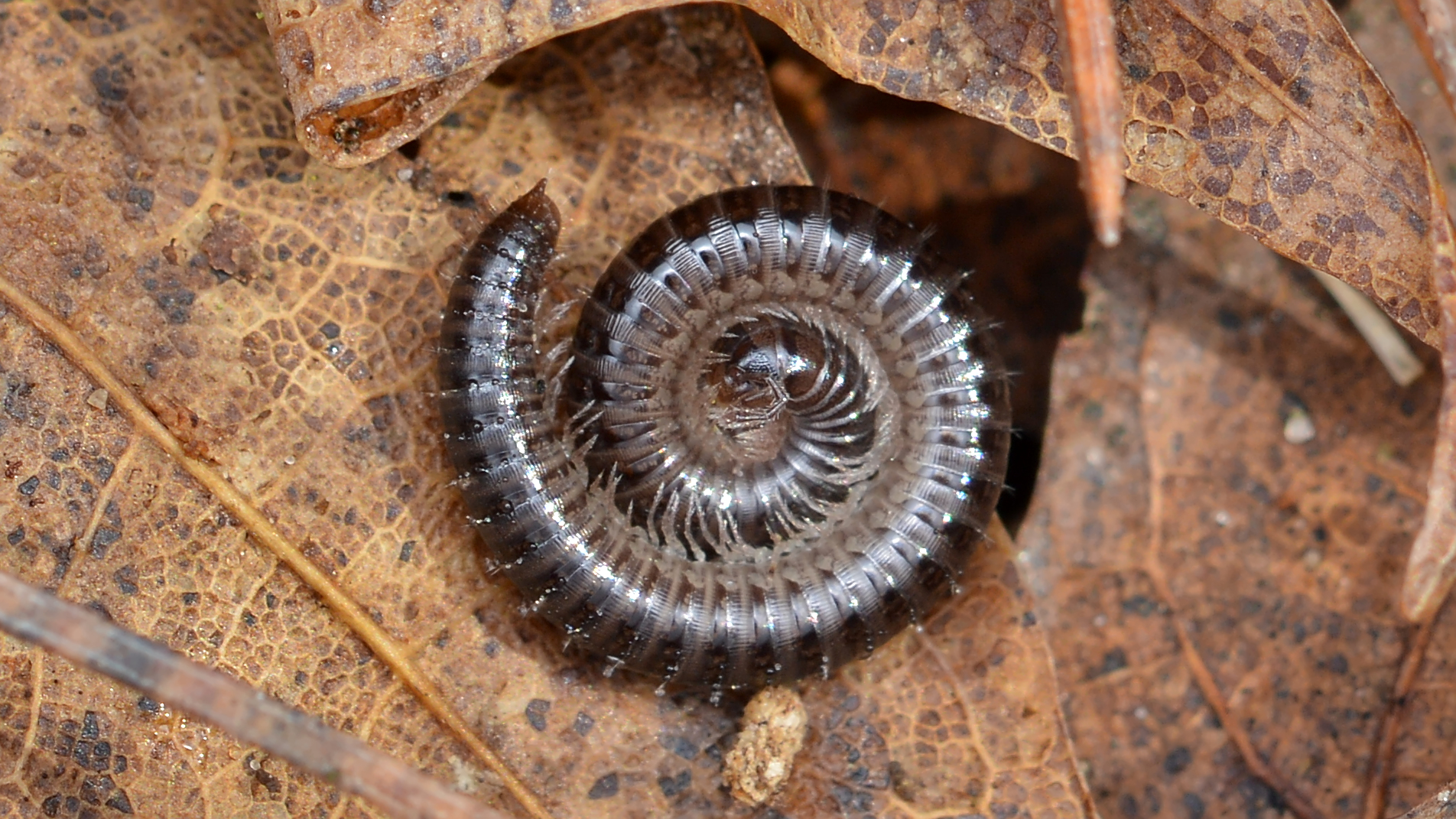

Scientific classification
- Kingdom: Animalia
- Phylum: Arthropoda
- Subphylum: Myriapoda
- Class: Diplopoda
- Order: Julida
- Family: Julidae
- Genus: Ophyiulus
- Species: O. pilosus

Binomial name
- Ophyiulus pilosus (Newport, 1843)

= Ophyiulus pilosus =

Species of millipede

Ophyiulus pilosus is a species of millipede in the family Julidae. It is native to western Europe, and has been introduced throughout North America and New Zealand.

== Subspecies ==
These four subspecies belong to the species Ophyiulus pilosus:

- Ophyiulus pilosus brevispinosus Loksa, 1962^{c g}
- Ophyiulus pilosus etruscus Verhoeff, 1932^{c g}
- Ophyiulus pilosus major Bigler & Verhoeff, 1929^{c g}
- Ophyiulus pilosus populi Verhoeff, 1932^{c g}

Data sources: i = ITIS, c = Catalogue of Life, g = GBIF, b = Bugguide.net
