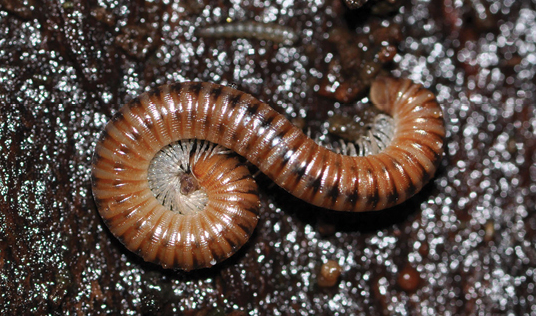
- Cylindroiulus boleti

Scientific classification
- Kingdom: Animalia
- Phylum: Arthropoda
- Subphylum: Myriapoda
- Class: Diplopoda
- Order: Julida
- Family: Julidae
- Genus: Cylindroiulus; Verhoeff, 1894

= Cylindroiulus =

Genus of millipedes

Cylindroiulus is a genus of millipedes of the Julidae family.

== Species ==
Listed alphabetically.

- Cylindroiulus abaligetanus
- Cylindroiulus aetnensis
- Cylindroiulus anglilectus
- Cylindroiulus aostanus
- Cylindroiulus apenninorum
- Cylindroiulus arborum
- Cylindroiulus aternanus
- Cylindroiulus attenuatus
- Cylindroiulus bellus
- Cylindroiulus boleti
- Cylindroiulus boreoibericus
- Cylindroiulus brachyiuloides
- Cylindroiulus britannicus
- Cylindroiulus broti
- Cylindroiulus burzenlandicus
- Cylindroiulus caeruleocinctus
- Cylindroiulus cambio
- Cylindroiulus cantonii
- Cylindroiulus caramujensis
- Cylindroiulus chalandei
- Cylindroiulus cristagalli
- Cylindroiulus dahli
- Cylindroiulus decipiens
- Cylindroiulus digitus
- Cylindroiulus disjunctus
- Cylindroiulus dubius
- Cylindroiulus exiguus
- Cylindroiulus fenestratus
- Cylindroiulus festai
- Cylindroiulus fimbriatus
- Cylindroiulus finitimus
- Cylindroiulus franzi
- Cylindroiulus fulviceps
- Cylindroiulus gemellus
- Cylindroiulus generosensis
- Cylindroiulus gestri
- Cylindroiulus gigas
- Cylindroiulus gregoryi
- Cylindroiulus hirticauda
- Cylindroiulus horvathi
- Cylindroiulus ibericus
- Cylindroiulus iluronensis
- Cylindroiulus infernalis
- Cylindroiulus insolidus
- Cylindroiulus italicus
- Cylindroiulus julipes
- Cylindroiulus kappa
- Cylindroiulus lagrecai
- Cylindroiulus latestriatus
- Cylindroiulus latro
- Cylindroiulus latzeli
- Cylindroiulus laurisilvae
- Cylindroiulus limitaneus
- Cylindroiulus londinensis
- Cylindroiulus lundbladi
- Cylindroiulus luridus
- Cylindroiulus madeirae
- Cylindroiulus meinerti
- Cylindroiulus molisius
- Cylindroiulus numerosus
- Cylindroiulus obscurior
- Cylindroiulus pallidior
- Cylindroiulus parisiorum
- Cylindroiulus pelatensis
- Cylindroiulus perforatus
- Cylindroiulus propinquus
- Cylindroiulus punctatus (Leach, 1815) – blunt-tailed snake millipede
- Cylindroiulus pyrenaicus
- Cylindroiulus quadratistipes
- Cylindroiulus rabacalensis
- Cylindroiulus rubidicollis
- Cylindroiulus rufifrons
- Cylindroiulus sagittarius
- Cylindroiulus salicivorus
- Cylindroiulus sanctimichaelis
- Cylindroiulus sangranus
- Cylindroiulus sardous
- Cylindroiulus schubarti
- Cylindroiulus segregatus
- Cylindroiulus siculus
- Cylindroiulus solarius
- Cylindroiulus solis
- Cylindroiulus sorrentinus
- Cylindroiulus speluncaris
- Cylindroiulus strasseri
- Cylindroiulus transmarinus
- Cylindroiulus tricuspis
- Cylindroiulus truncorum
- Cylindroiulus turinensis
- Cylindroiulus uncinatus
- Cylindroiulus uroxiphos
- Cylindroiulus velatus
- Cylindroiulus ventaneana
- Cylindroiulus verhoeffi
- Cylindroiulus vulnerarius
- Cylindroiulus waldeni
- Cylindroiulus xynon
- Cylindroiulus ynnox
- Cylindroiulus zarcoi
