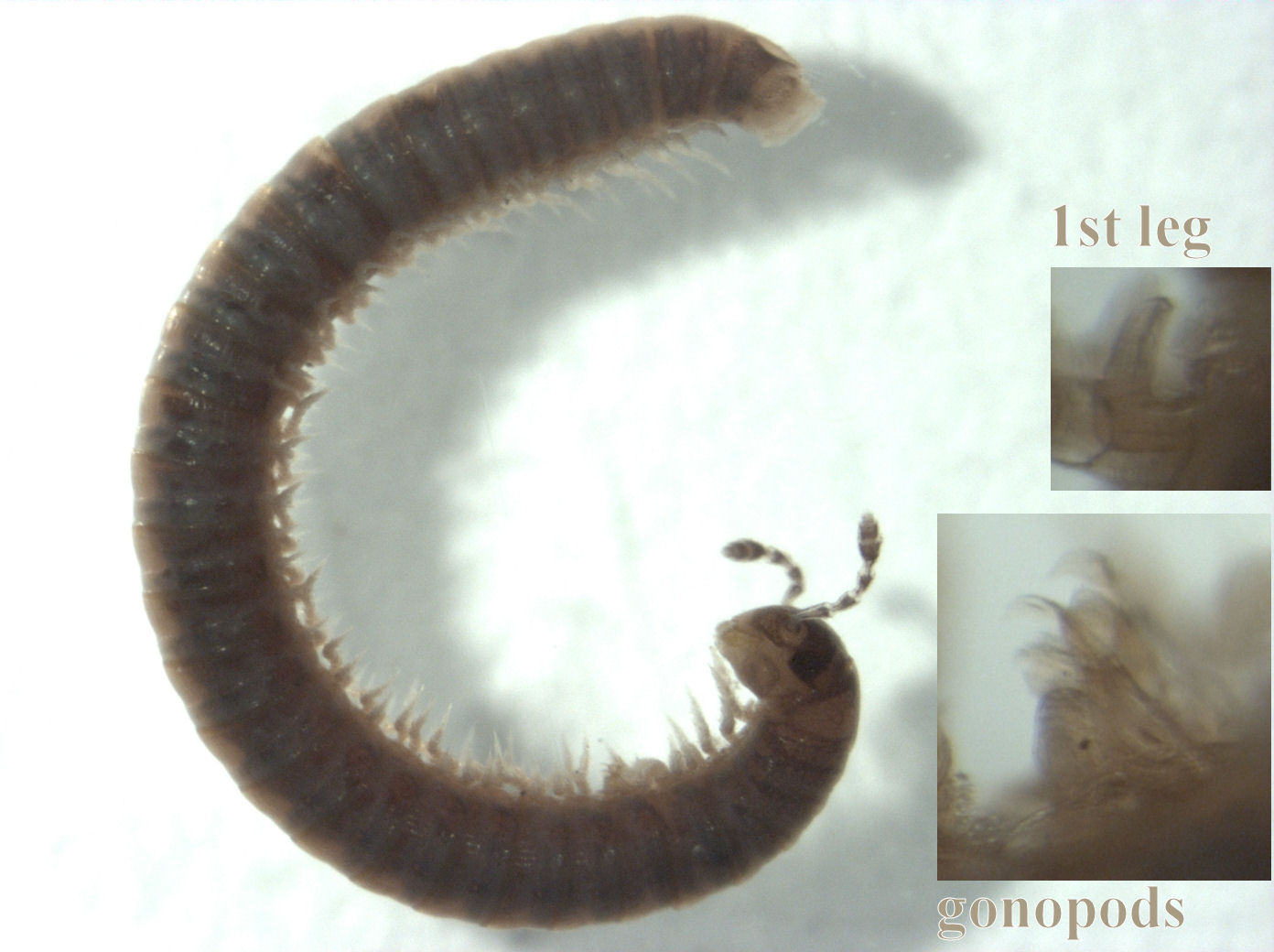
- A male from New Zealand

Scientific classification
- Kingdom: Animalia
- Phylum: Arthropoda
- Subphylum: Myriapoda
- Class: Diplopoda
- Order: Julida
- Family: Julidae
- Genus: Brachyiulus
- Species: B. pusillus

Binomial name
- Brachyiulus pusillus (Leach, 1815)

Synonyms
- Julus pusillus Leach, 1815

= Brachyiulus pusillus =

Species of millipede

Brachyiulus pusillus is a species of millipede in the family Julidae. It is widespread in Europe and has also been introduced to islands around the world, continental South America, South Africa, and Oceania, and is potentially widespread in North America, although previous records may have confused B. pusilus with the related B. lusitanus. The species is brownish-black coloured and has 30–34 segments. They also have either light yellowish or reddish lines that are located closer to the centre of the back. It can be found on bushes and trees. The species are commonly found in walls or fences.
