= Graecoiulus =

Scientific classification
- Domain: Eukaryota
- Kingdom: Animalia
- Phylum: Arthropoda
- Subphylum: Myriapoda
- Class: Diplopoda
- Order: Julida
- Family: Julidae
- Subfamily: Julinae
- Genus: Graecoiulus; Vagalinski & Lazányi, 2018

Type species
- Chromatoiulus imbecillus Attems, 1935

Genus of millipedes

Graecoiulus is a genus of millipedes in the family Julidae. Members of the genus can be found in parts of the Balkans. The genus contains about 4 species.

== Etymology ==
At least one of the species is only distributed in Greece, hence the name Graecoiulus.

=== Species ===
The following species are included in the genus.

- Graecoiulus imbecillus Attems, 1935
- Graecoiulus loebli Strasser, 1974
- Graecoiulus vicinus Verhoeff, 1903
- Graecoiulus skopelius Vagalinski & Lazányi, 2018
