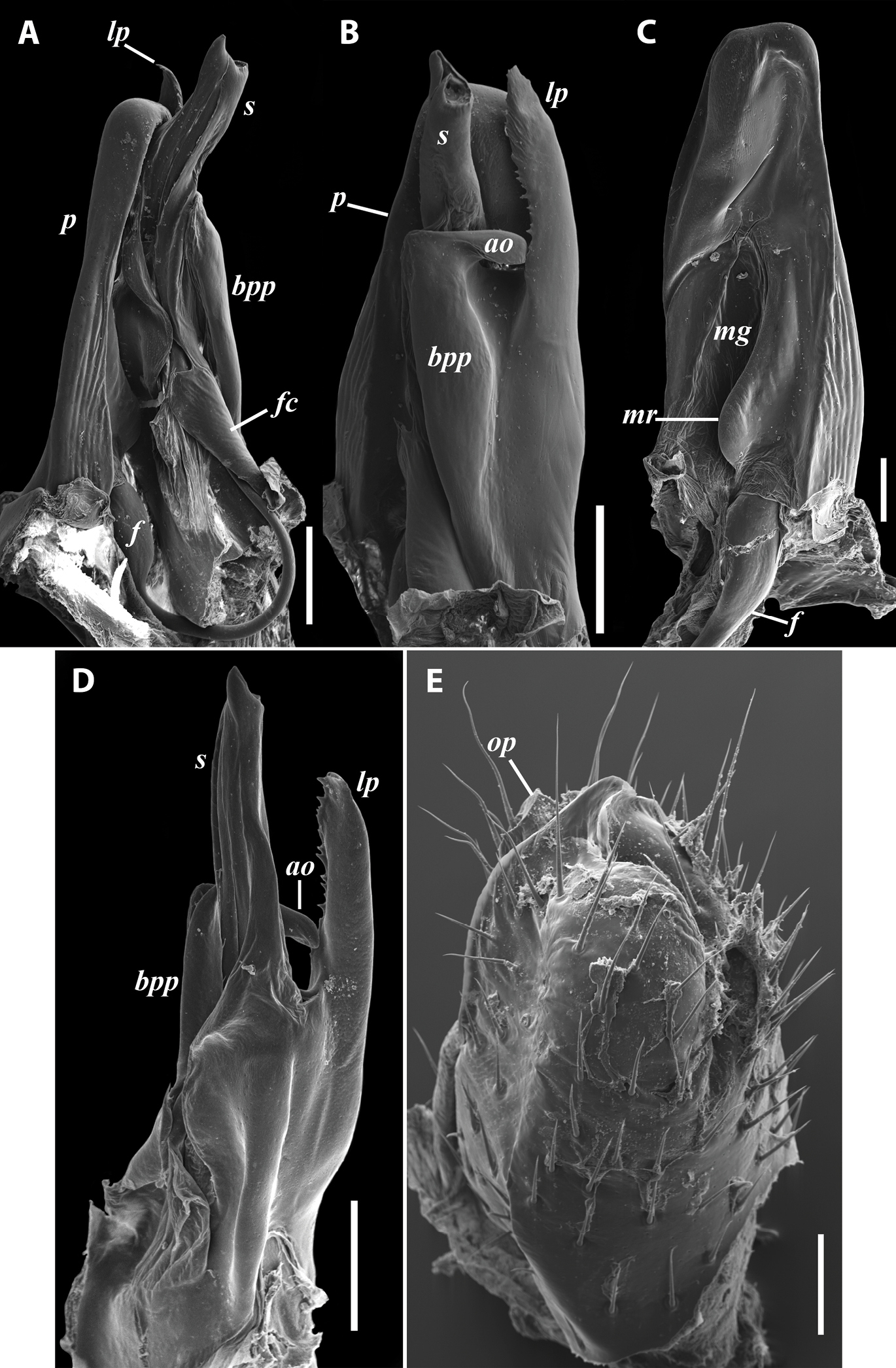
- Gonopods of Byzantorhopalum rossicum (A-D = male | E = female)

Scientific classification
- Kingdom: Animalia
- Phylum: Arthropoda
- Subphylum: Myriapoda
- Class: Diplopoda
- Order: Julida
- Family: Julidae
- Genus: Byzantorhopalum; Verhoeff, 1930

Type species
- Brachyiulus byzantinus Verhoeff, 1901

= Byzantorhopalum =

Genus of millipedes

Byzantorhopalum is a genus of millipedes in the family Julidae, containing around 13 species. Members of the genus can be found in southwestern Russia, the Balkans, western Turkey, and Ukraine.

== Description ==
Byzantorhopalum varies in color from somewhat beige to dark gray. They often have a black line running down their backs (a dorsal line).

=== Species ===
Zootaxa includes the following species, arranged in subgenera.

Subgenus Byzantorhopalum Verhoeff, 1930

- Byzantorhopalum byzantum Verhoeff, 1901
- Byzantorhopalum elephantum Vagalinski & Lazányi, 2018
- Byzantorhopalum lictor Attems, 1904
- Byzantorhopalum rossicum Timotheew, 1897
- Byzantorhopalum sapphicum Strasser, 1976

Subgenus Ioniulus Vagalinski & Lazányi, 2018

- Byzantorhopalum cephalonicum Strasser, 1974
- Byzantorhopalum clavamum Vagalinski & Lazányi, 2018
- Byzantorhopalum danyii Lazányi & Korsós, 2012
- Byzantorhopalum lamellifer Strasser, 1974
- Byzantorhopalum leucadium Attems, 1929
- Byzantorhopalum recticauda Attems, 1903

Unassigned

- Byzantorhopalum karschi Verhoeff, 1901
- Byzantorhopalum taygetanum Attems, 1903
