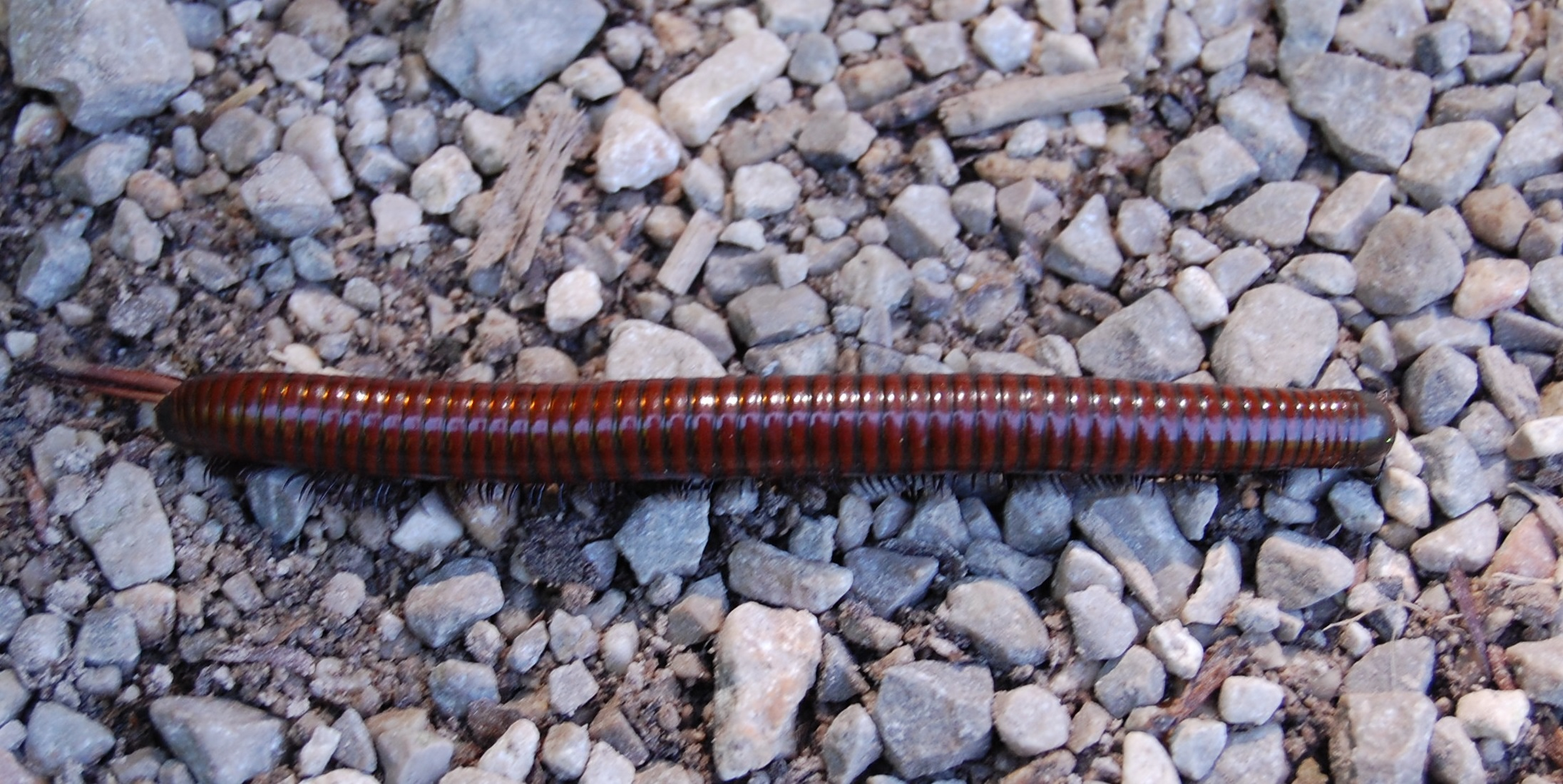
- Pachyiulus hungaricus

Scientific classification
- Kingdom: Animalia
- Phylum: Arthropoda
- Subphylum: Myriapoda
- Class: Diplopoda
- Order: Julida
- Family: Julidae
- Genus: Pachyiulus; Berlese, 1883

= Pachyiulus =

Genus of millipedes

Pachyiulus is a genus of julid millipedes containing the following species:

- Pachyiulus apfelbecki Verhoeff, 1901
- Pachyiulus asiaeminoris (Verhoeff, 1898)
- Pachyiulus brussensis Verhoeff, 1941
- Pachyiulus cattarensis (Latzel, 1884)
- Pachyiulus communis Savi, 1817
- Pachyiulus dentiger Verhoeff, 1901
- Pachyiulus flavipes (Koch, C. L., 1847)
- Pachyiulus humicola Verhoeff, 1910
- Pachyiulus hungaricus (Karsch, 1881)
- Pachyiulus krivolutskyi Golovatch, 1977
- Pachyiulus lobifer Attems, 1939
- Pachyiulus marmoratus Verhoeff, 1901
- Pachyiulus oenologus (Berlese, 1886)
- Pachyiulus silvestrii Verhoeff, 1923
- Pachyiulus speciosus Verhoeff, 1901
- Pachyiulus valonensis Verhoeff, 1901
- Pachyiulus varius (Fabricius, 1781)
