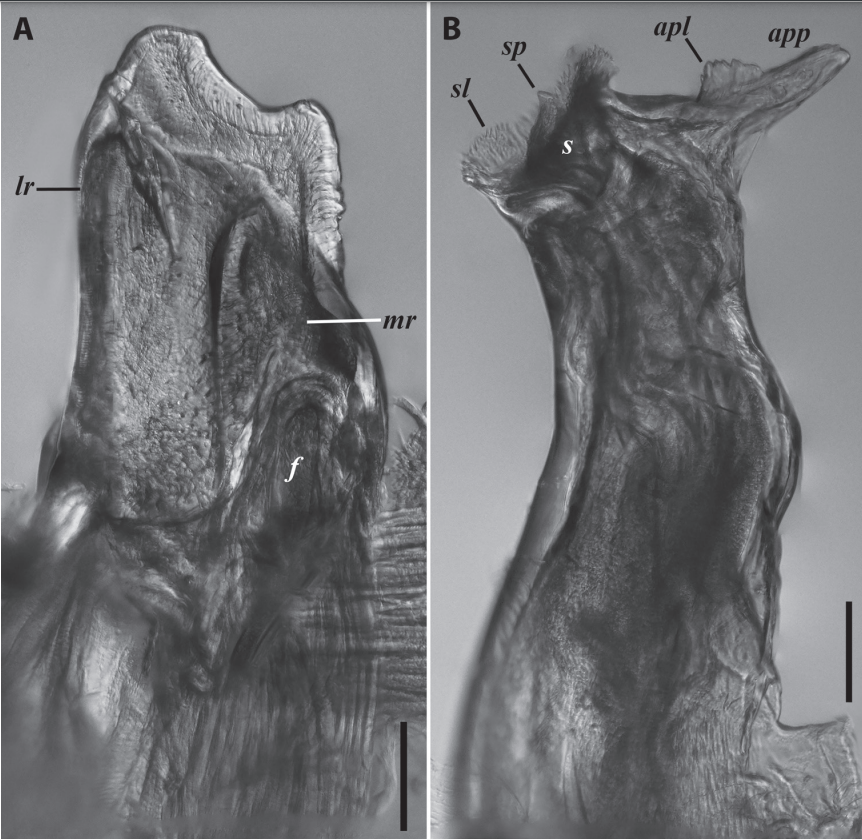
- Male gonopods (part of genitals) from Cyphobrachyiulus redikorzevi

Scientific classification
- Kingdom: Animalia
- Phylum: Arthropoda
- Subphylum: Myriapoda
- Class: Diplopoda
- Order: Julida
- Family: Julidae
- Subfamily: Julinae
- Tribe: Brachyiulini
- Genus: Cyphobrachyiulus; Verhoeff, 1900

Type species
- Brachyiulus argolicus Verhoeff, 1900

Species
- See text

= Cyphobrachyiulus =

Genus of millipedes

Cyphobrachyiulus is a genus of millipedes in the family Julidae. It contains around 21 species. Members can be found in southwestern Russia, Turkey, Greece, and Bulgaria.

== Description ==
Members of Cyphobrachyiulus have a length of 15–42 mm. They are generally dark and have a black dorsal line. They get lighter approaching the ventral side (the underside) where they may be somewhat beige.

=== Species ===
The following species, arranged by subgenus, are included in Cyphobrachyiulus.

Subgenus Cyphobrachyiulus Verhoeff, 1900

- Cyphobrachyiulus argolicus Verhoeff, 1900
- Cyphobrachyiulus digitatus Lazányi & Korsós, 2012
- Cyphobrachyiulus euphorbiarum Verhoeff, 1900
- Cyphobrachyiulus spartanus Vagalinski & Lazányi, 2018

Subgenus Acropoditius Strasser, 1980

- Cyphobrachyiulus kinzelbachi Strasser, 1980
- Cyphobrachyiulus mueggenburgi Verhoeff, 1901

Subgenus Diaxylus Attems, 1940

- Cyphobrachyiulus anatolicus Attems, 1927
- Cyphobrachyiulus asiaeminoris Verhoeff, 1898
- Cyphobrachyiulus graecus Vagalinski & Lazányi, 2018
- Cyphobrachyiulus kosswigi Verhoeff, 1940
- Cyphobrachyiulus litoreus Lignau, 1903
- Cyphobrachyiulus nigrivallis Attems, 1940
- Cyphobrachyiulus tetricus Attems, 1932
- Cyphobrachyiulus ulunus Verhoeff, 1941

Subgenus Grusiniulus Lohmander, 1936

- Cyphobrachyiulus redikorzevi Lohmander, 1936

Subgenus Rhamphidoiulus Attems, 1905

- Cyphobrachyiulus aydosius Verhoeff, 1943
- Cyphobrachyiulus bujukderensis Attems, 1905
- Cyphobrachyiulus claviger Verhoeff, 1943

Unassigned

- Cyphobrachyiulus harpagonifer Strasser, 1980
- Cyphobrachyiulus taygeti Strasser, 1976
- Cyphobrachyiulus uncinatus Golovatch et al., 2004
