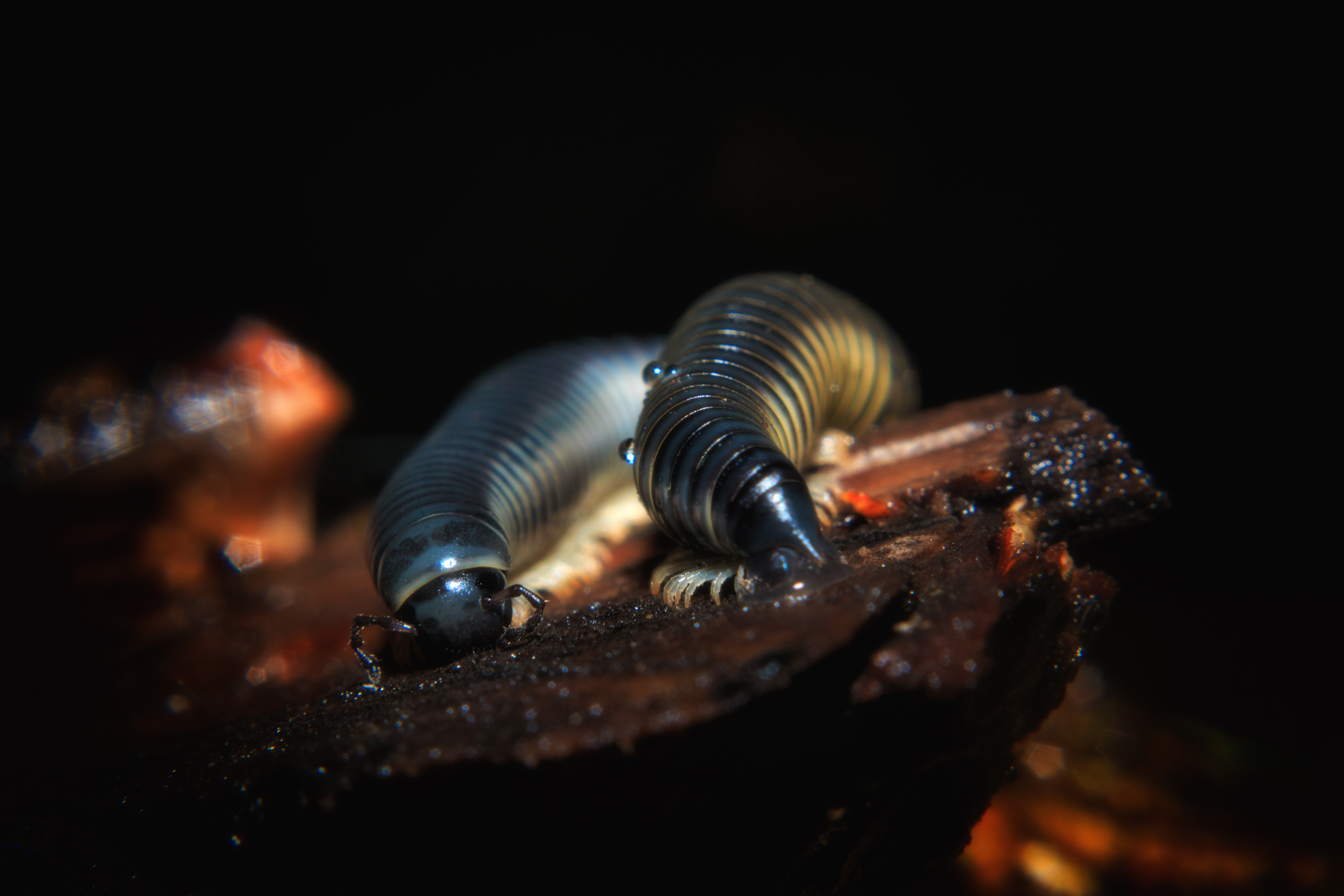
- Rossiulus kessleri

Scientific classification
- Kingdom: Animalia
- Phylum: Arthropoda
- Subphylum: Myriapoda
- Class: Diplopoda
- Order: Julida
- Family: Julidae
- Genus: Rossiulus; Attems, 1926

= Rossiulus =

Genus of many-legged arthropods

Rossiulus is a genus of millipedes belonging to the family Julidae.

== Species ==
The following species are recognised in the genus Rossiulus:

- Rossiulus kessleri (Lohmander, 1927)
- Rossiulus vilnensis (Jawłowski, 1925)
