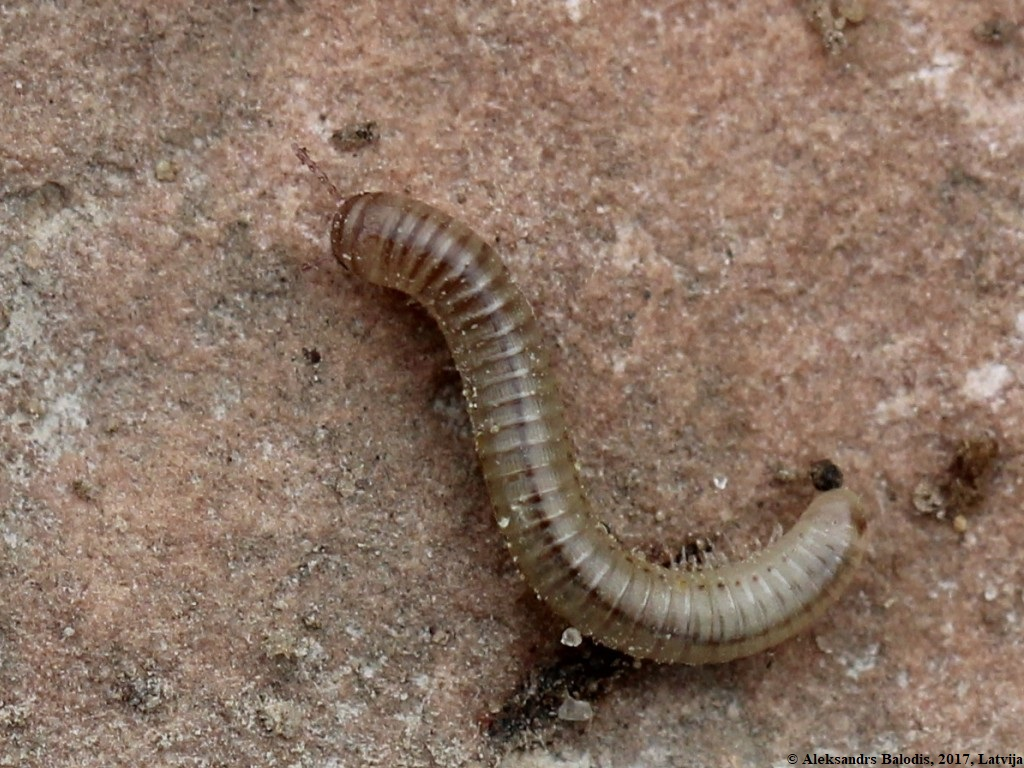

Scientific classification
- Kingdom: Animalia
- Phylum: Arthropoda
- Subphylum: Myriapoda
- Class: Diplopoda
- Order: Julida
- Family: Julidae
- Genus: Cylindroiulus
- Species: C. punctatus

Binomial name
- Cylindroiulus punctatus (Leach, 1815)

Synonyms
- Iulus punctatus Leach, 1815; Iulus lignicola Ribaut 1904; Cylindroiulus seguranus Attems 1927; Julus silvarum Meinert 1868

= Cylindroiulus punctatus =

Species of millipede

Cylindroiulus punctatus, commonly known as the blunt-tailed snake millipede, is a species of millipede in the family Julidae. It was described by Leach in 1815 and can be found in western Europe, including Great Britain. It has been introduced in North America.

== Description and habitat ==
The species are brown, have 100 legs and move slowly. They are punctuated, but its difficult to spot the dots. It can be found on trees, just under the bark. They live a long time and it takes them three years to reach sexual maturity.
