= Leptoiulus =

Scientific classification
- Kingdom: Animalia
- Phylum: Arthropoda
- Subphylum: Myriapoda
- Class: Diplopoda
- Order: Julida
- Family: Julidae
- Genus: Leptoiulus; Verhoeff, 1894

Genus of many-legged arthropods

Leptoiulus is a genus of millipedes belonging to the family Julidae.

The species of this genus are found in Europe.

Species:

- Leptoiulus abietum Verhoeff, 1914
- Leptoiulus alemannicus (Verhoeff, 1892)
