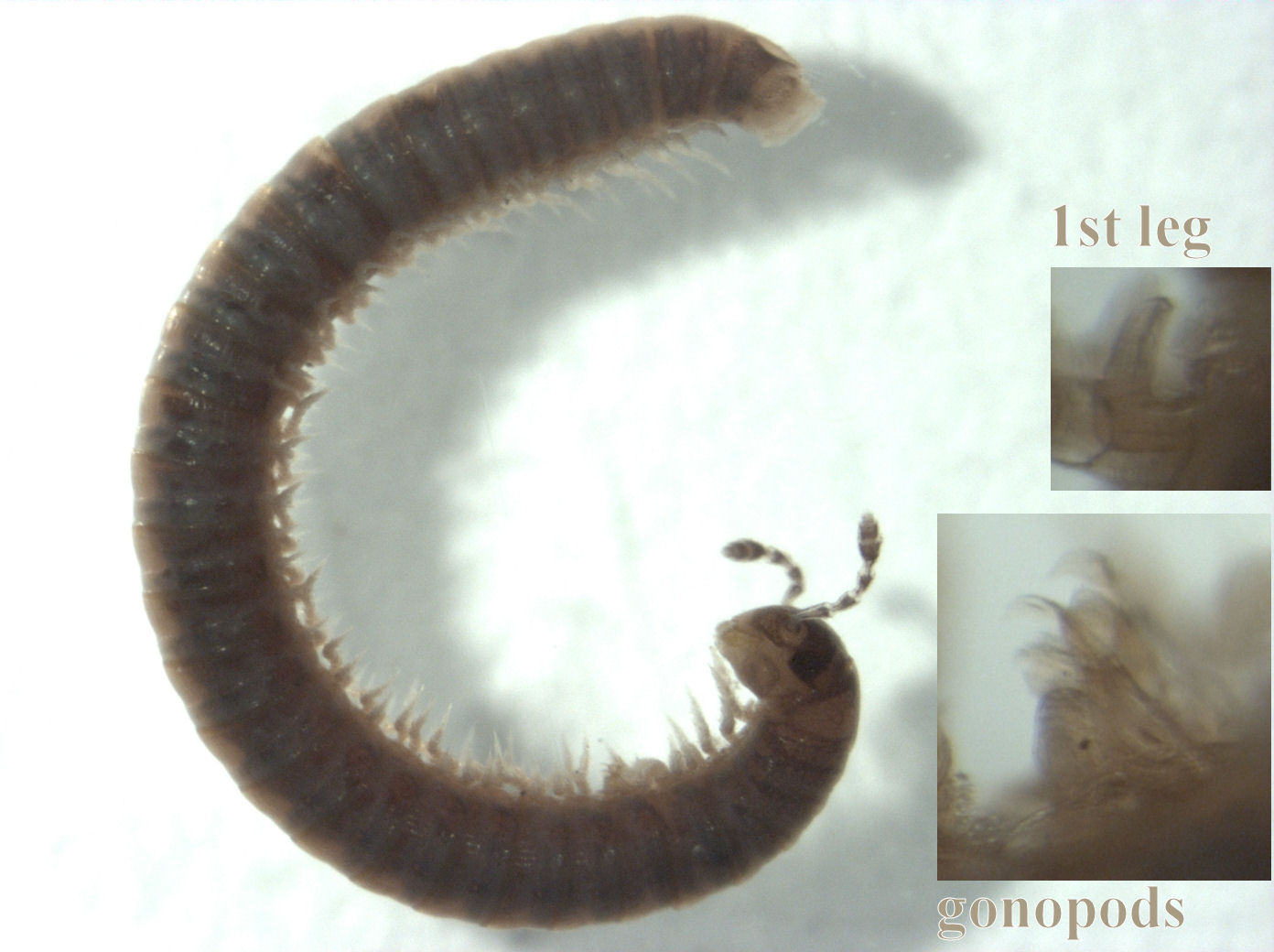
- Brachyiulus pusillus

Scientific classification
- Kingdom: Animalia
- Phylum: Arthropoda
- Subphylum: Myriapoda
- Class: Diplopoda
- Order: Julida
- Family: Julidae
- Genus: Brachyiulus; Berlese, 1884

Type species
- Brachyiulus pusillus (Leach, 1815)

Species
- See text

Synonyms
- Microbrachyiulus Verhoeff 1897; Anoploiulus Verhoeff 1894; Brachiulus Berlese 1886

= Brachyiulus =

Genus of millipedes

Brachyiulus is a genus of millipedes, containing around eight species, most of which live in the Mediterranean Basin of Europe and Asia. The species B. pusillus has been introduced widely around the world

== Species ==
Brachyiulus apfelbecki Verhoeff 1898
Brachyiulus bagnalli (Brolemann 1924)
Brachyiulus jawlowskii Lohmander 1928
Brachyiulus klisurensis Verhoeff 1903
Brachyiulus lusitanus Verhoeff 1898
Brachyiulus pusillus (Leach 1814)
Brachyiulus stuxbergi (Fanzago 1875)
Brachyiulus varibolinus Attems 1904
