= Buchneria (millipede) =

Scientific classification
- Kingdom: Animalia
- Phylum: Arthropoda
- Subphylum: Myriapoda
- Class: Diplopoda
- Order: Julida
- Family: Julidae
- Genus: Buchneria; Verhoeff, 1941

Genus of myriapods

Buchneria is a genus of millipedes belonging to the family Julidae.

The species of this genus are found in Italy.

Species:

- Buchneria cornuta Verhoeff, 1941
- Buchneria sicula Strasser, 1959
