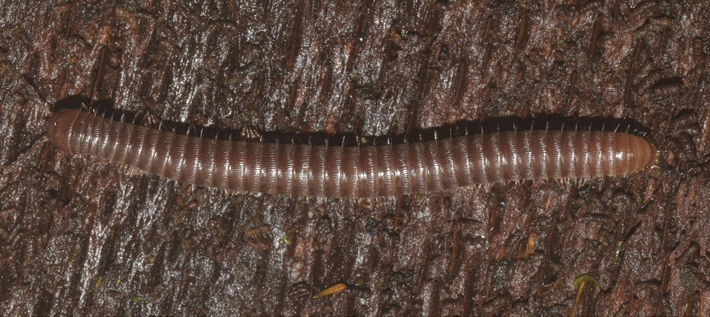
- Unciger foetidus

Scientific classification
- Domain: Eukaryota
- Kingdom: Animalia
- Phylum: Arthropoda
- Subphylum: Myriapoda
- Class: Diplopoda
- Order: Julida
- Family: Julidae
- Genus: Unciger; Brandt, 1841

= Unciger =

Genus of myriapods

Unciger is a genus of millipedes belonging to the family Julidae.

The species of this genus are found in Europe.

Species:

- Unciger foetidus (Koch, 1838)
- Unciger kubanus Lohmander, 1936
