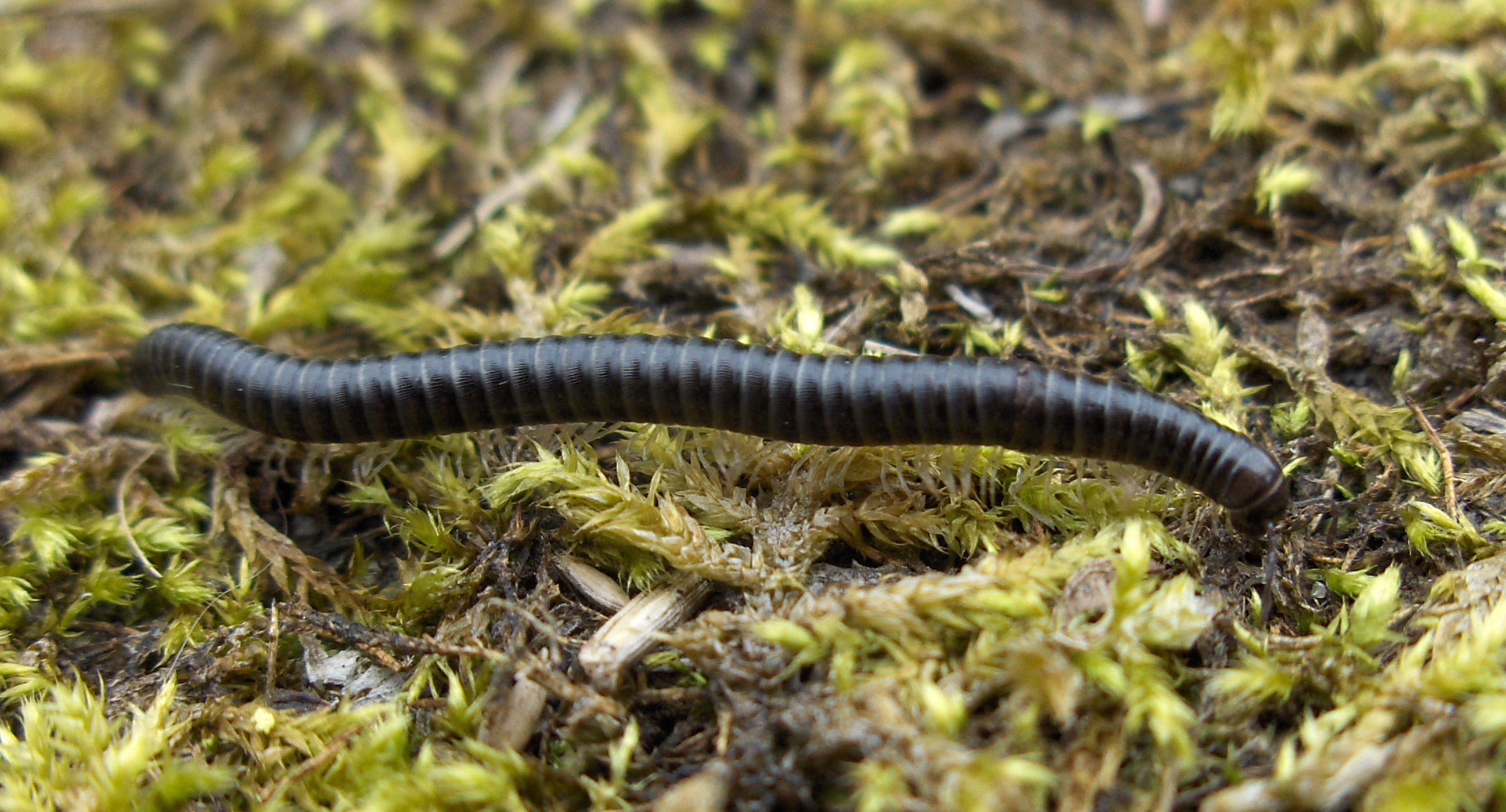
- T. niger walking over moss
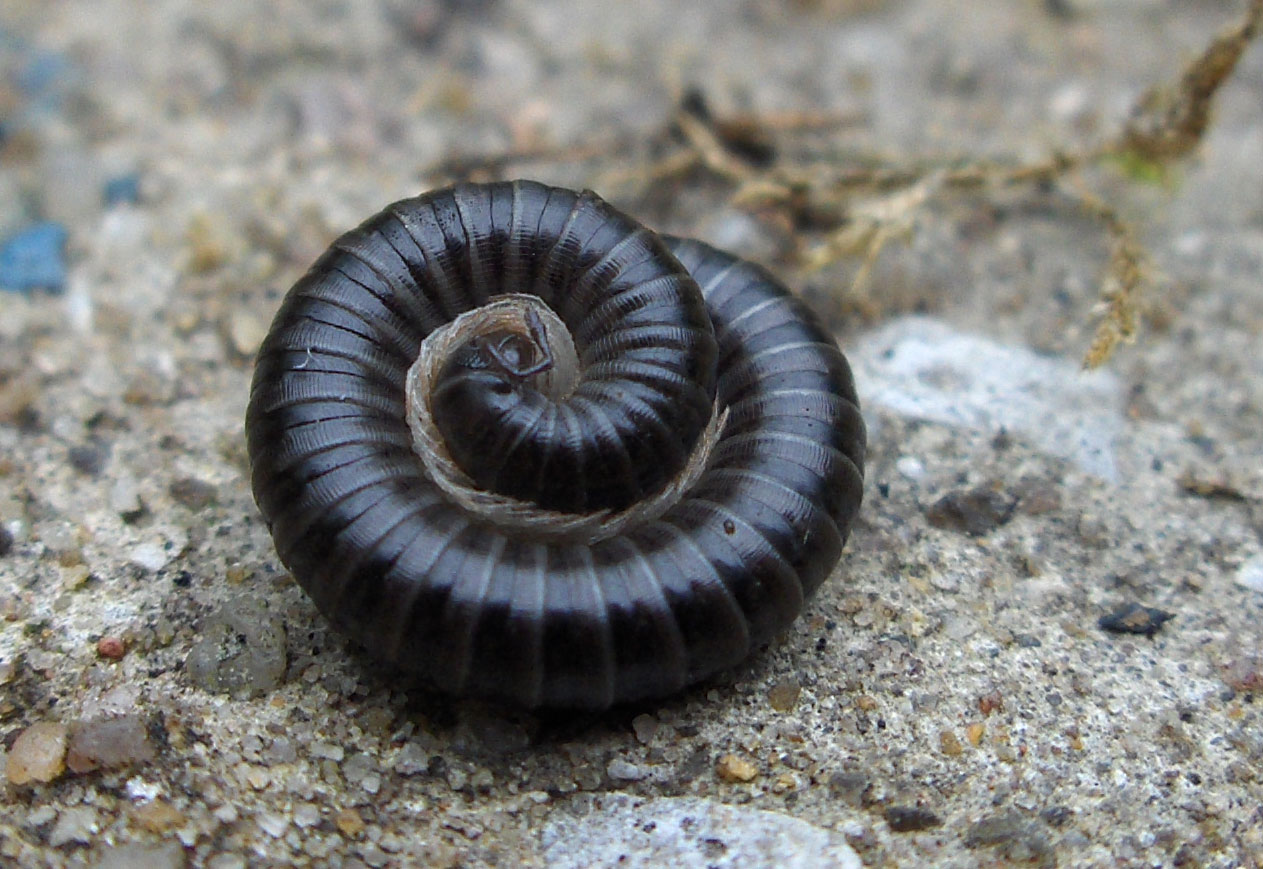
- T. niger in defensive posture

Scientific classification
- Kingdom: Animalia
- Phylum: Arthropoda
- Subphylum: Myriapoda
- Class: Diplopoda
- Order: Julida
- Family: Julidae
- Genus: Tachypodoiulus
- Species: T. niger

Binomial name
- Tachypodoiulus niger (Leach, 1814)

= Tachypodoiulus niger =

Species of millipede

Tachypodoiulus niger, known variously as the white-legged snake millipede or the black millipede, is a European species of millipede. It is very similar to other species such as Cylindroiulus londinensis, from which it can be reliably distinguished only by studying the shape of the telson. It occurs in Ireland, Britain, Spain, France, Benelux, Germany, Switzerland, Austria and the Czech Republic, and is especially common on chalky and limestone soils.

T. niger has a roughly cylindrical shiny black body, with around 100 pairs of contrasting white legs on its 41–56 body segments. It lives in leaf litter, under bark or in moss, and feeds on encrusting algae, detritus and sometimes fruit such as raspberries. Predators of T. niger include the centipedes Lithobius variegatus and Lithobius forficatus and hedgehogs.

T. niger is most active from one hour after sunset to one hour before sunrise, although in summer it also becomes active in the afternoon. Like many millipedes, T. niger coils itself into a spiral, with its legs on the inside and its head in the centre, when it is threatened, but it can also flee with sidewinding movements.
