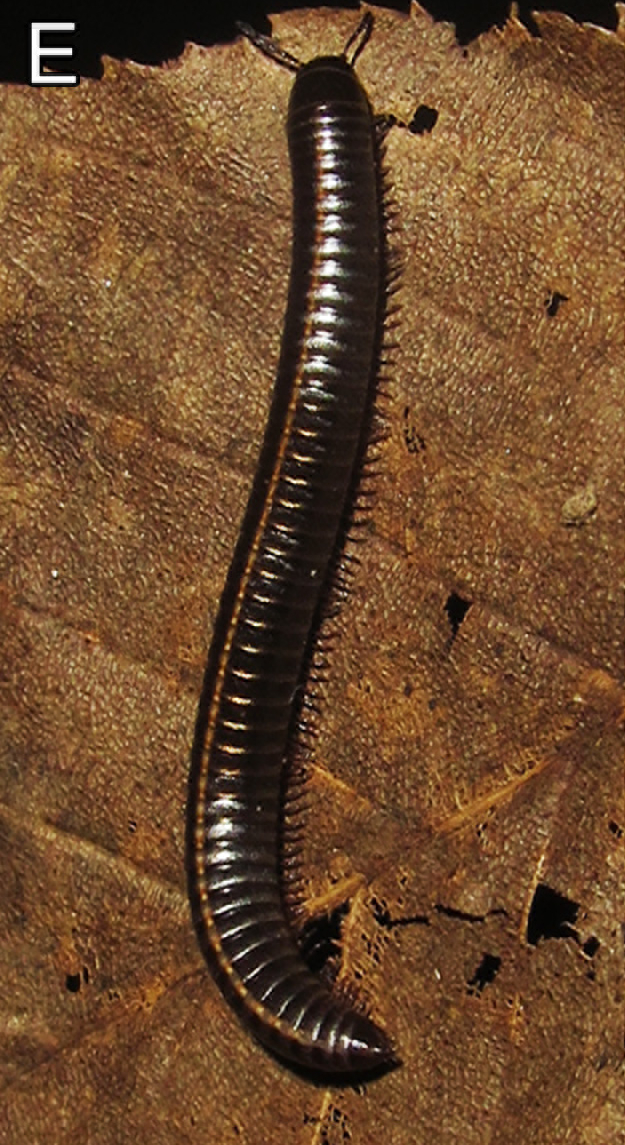
- Megaphyllum unilineatum

Scientific classification
- Domain: Eukaryota
- Kingdom: Animalia
- Phylum: Arthropoda
- Subphylum: Myriapoda
- Class: Diplopoda
- Order: Julida
- Family: Julidae
- Genus: Megaphyllum; Verhoeff, 1894

= Megaphyllum (millipede) =

Genus of many-legged arthropods

Megaphyllum is a genus of myriapods belonging to the family Julidae.

The species of this genus are found in Europe and Russia.

Species:

- Megaphyllum arcuatum
- Megaphyllum asiaminoris (Verhoeff, 1898)
