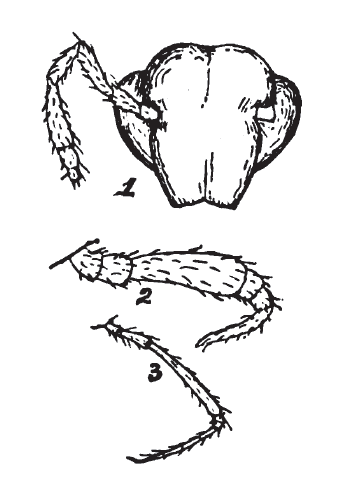
- Head (1), enlarged 6th leg (2), and normal leg (3) of a male

Conservation status
- Vulnerable (NatureServe)

Scientific classification
- Missing taxonomy template (fix): Zygonopus
- Species: Template:Taxonomy/ZygonopusZ. whitei

Binomial name
- Template:Taxonomy/ZygonopusZygonopus whitei Ryder, 1881

Synonyms
- Trichopetalum whitei (Ryder, 1881)

= Zygonopus whitei =

Species of millipede

Zygonopus whitei, commonly known as the Luray Caverns blind cave millipede, is a rare species of troglobitic (obligate cavernicolous) millipede in the family x. It is endemic to a small area of the eastern United States in the upper Potomac River drainage of four Virginia counties and three West Virginia counties. It has been recorded from 12 caves across this range, including the Luray Caverns where it was first discovered and described.

== Description ==
Zygonopus whitei is an eyeless, white (unpigmented) millipede. In common with all trichopetalids, it has rows of very elongate segmental setae extending in rows along the dorsal side. Proper identification requires microscopic examination and dissection of the gonopods (copulatory apparatus) by a specialist skilled in millipede identification.

== Ecology and range ==
Zygonopus whitei is a troglobite and occurs only in caves, especially occurring on damp, rotting wood. T. whitei is presumably omnivorous, although nothing is known of its feeding preferences. Feeding is presumed to consist of picking up or scraping material from the substrate with the mouthparts then grinding with the mandibles.

The species is recorded from caves in the upper Potomac River drainage in Virginia (Augusta, Page, Rockingham, and Shenandoah Counties) and West Virginia (Hardy, Grant, and Pendleton Counties). However, if another cave millipede, T. weyeriensis, intergrades with T. whitei in Pendleton County and these two species are synonymous (as some workers believe), then the range of T. whitei would also extend into Greenbrier, Monroe and Pocahontas Counties in West Virginia.

== Reproduction and life cycle ==
Nothing is known of the life history of this species. In related species, the male secretes sperm from pores on the coxae of the second legs into coxal sacs on the post-gonopodal legs. The secretions from the coxal sacs then form the seminal fluid into a spermatophore which is then transferred to the cyphopods of the female during mating.

== Conservation status ==
Zygonopus whitei is considered globally vulnerable to extinction by NatureServe, with populations in West Virginia considered critically imperiled, and Virginia populations imperiled. T. whitei is designated as a Regional Forester Sensitive Species in the Monongahela National Forest in the Eastern Region of the Forest Service.

== Taxonomy ==
Zygonopus whitei was first described as Zygonopus whitei by Ryder in 1881. Causey has suggested that Zygonopus weyeriensis may be a subspecies of Zygonopus whitei rather than a distinct species.
