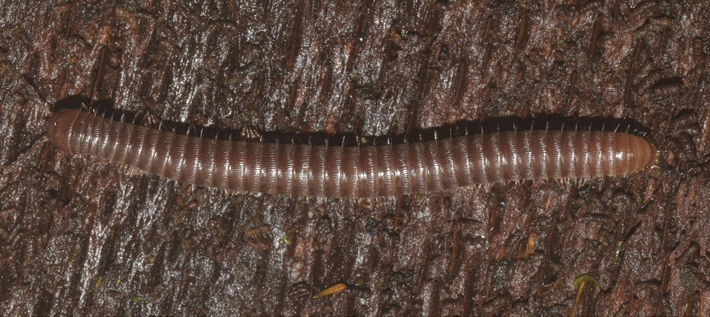
- Unciger foetidus

Scientific classification
- Kingdom: Animalia
- Phylum: Arthropoda
- Subphylum: Myriapoda
- Class: Diplopoda
- Order: Julida
- Superfamily: Juloidea
- Family: Julidae; Leach, 1814

Genera
- See text

= Julidae =

Family of millipedes

Julidae is a family of millipedes in the order Julida, containing more than 600 species in around 20 genera. Its members are largely confined to the Western Palaearctic, with only a few species extending into the Oriental and Afrotropical realms. They are united by a characteristic form of the mouthparts, and are classified in the superfamily Juloidea of the order Julida, alongside the families Trichoblaniulidae, Rhopaloiulidae and Trichonemasomatidae.

== Genera ==
The family consists of the following genera:

- Acanthoiulus Verhoeff, 1894
- Acropoditius Strasser, 1980
- Acrovelatus Attems, 1927
- Aegatoiulus Strasser, 1969
- Afropachyiulus Schubart, 1960
- Allajulus Koch, 1847
- Allopodoiulus Verhoeff, 1898
- Allotyphloiulus Verhoeff, 1905
- Alpicylindrus Verhoeff, 1930
- Alpityphlus Strasser, 1967
- Amblyiulus Silvestri, 1896
- Anagaiulus Enghoff, 1992
- Anatolicus Verhoeff, 1941
- Anaulaciulus Pocock, 1895
- Ancistropus Verhoeff, 1943
- Aneuloboiulus Verhoeff, 1899
- Anoploiulus Verhoeff, 1894
- Anuroleptophyllum Attems, 1901
- Apareiulus Brölemann, 1897
- Apenninicylindrus Verhoeff, 1941
- Apfelbeckiella Verhoeff, 1901
- Archileucogeorgia Lohmander, 1936
- Archiulus Scudder, 1868
- Armeniobrachyiulus Lohmander, 1936
- Armeniophyllum Lohmander, 1932
- Atopocystis Attems, 1951
- Attemsotyphlus Strasser, 1962
- Balkaniulus Gulička, 1967
- Balkanophoenix Verhoeff, 1937
- Banatoiulus Tabacaru, 1985
- Baskoiulus Verhoeff, 1938
- Bertkaupolypus Verhoeff, 1926
- Bothroiulus Verhoeff, 1894
- Bracheioiulus Verhoeff, 1930
- Brachiulus
- Brachyiulus Berlese, 1884
- Brachymesius Attems, 1927
- Buchneria Verhoeff, 1941
- Bulgaroiulus Verhoeff, 1928
- Byzantorhopalum Verhoeff, 1930
- Calyptophyllum Brölemann, 1922
- Campodes
- Cannoniulus Verhoeff, 1929
- Carnioiulus Verhoeff, 1930
- Caspiopachyiulus Lohmander, 1932
- Castaneoiulus Verhoeff, 1930
- Catamicrophyllum Verhoeff, 1900
- Caucasoiulus Verhoeff, 1930
- Cerabrachyiulus Verhoeff, 1901
- Chaetoleptophyllum Verhoeff, 1898
- Chaitoiulus Verhoeff, 1895
- Cherifiulus Schubart, 1964
- Chersoiulus Strasser, 1938
- Chromatoiulus Verhoeff, 1894
- Colchiobrachyiulus Lohmander, 1936
- Crenatoiulus Attems, 1927
- Cryptoiulus Verhoeff, 1894
- Cylindroiulus Verhoeff, 1894
- Cyphobrachyiulus Verhoeff, 1900
- Cypriopachyiulus Strasser, 1967
- Dangaraiulus Golovatch, 1979
- Dendroiulus Verhoeff, 1930
- Diaxylus Attems, 1940
- Dicranotus Strasser, 1962
- Diploiulus Berlese, 1884
- Dittozus Attems, 1939
- Dolichiulus
- Dolichoiulus Verhoeff, 1900
- Donbrachyiulus Lohmander, 1936
- Elaphophyllum Verhoeff, 1921
- Elbaiulus Verhoeff, 1930
- Eleutheroiulus Verhoeff, 1894
- Enantiulus Attems, 1894
- Enghophyllum Lazányi & Vagalinski, 2013
- Ethmoiulus Verhoeff, 1943
- Euxinoiulus Lohmander, 1936
- Femoriferus Attems, 1904
- Fusiulus Attems, 1909
- Geopachyiulus Verhoeff, 1899
- Graecoiulus Vagalinski & Lazányi, 2018
- Grusiniulus Lohmander, 1936
- Haplophyllum Verhoeff, 1897
- Haplopodoiulus Verhoeff, 1898
- Haploprotopus Verhoeff, 1899
- Harpagophyllum Schubart, 1964
- Heloiulus Verhoeff, 1932
- Hemipodoiulus Verhoeff, 1892
- Heteroiulus Verhoeff, 1897
- Heteropachyiulus Lohmander, 1936
- Heteroporiulus Silvestri, 1897
- Hungaroiulus Lohmander, 1936
- Hylopachyiulus Attems, 1904
- Hypsoiulus Verhoeff, 1913
- Iberogallus Attems, 1927
- Interleptoiulus Mršić, 1988
- Inversotyphlus Strasser, 1962
- Iraniulus Attems, 1951
- Iraniulus Lohmander, 1932
- Ischiolobus
- Italoiulus Attems, 1940
- Iudaeoiulus Verhoeff, 1930
- Japanioiulus Verhoeff, 1937
- Japanopachyiulus Miyosi, 1957
- Julus Linnaeus, 1758
- Kabylinum Attems, 1952
- Kolpophylacum Attems, 1927
- Kryphioiulus Read, 1990
- Kubaniulus Lohmander, 1936
- Lamelloiulus Verhoeff, 1926
- Lamellotyphlus Tabacaru, 1976
- Leptoiulus Verhoeff, 1894
- Leptomastigoiulus Verhoeff, 1897
- Leptophyllum
- Leptotyphloiulus Verhoeff, 1899
- Leucogeorgia Verhoeff, 1930
- Leucoiulus Verhoeff, 1894
- Macedoiulus Verhoeff, 1932
- Macheiroiulus Verhoeff, 1901
- Maghrebiulus Schubart, 1964
- Mammamia Akkari, Stoev & Enghoff, 2011
- Martvilia Antić & Reip, 2020
- Mastigoiulus Attems, 1894
- Megaiulus Verhoeff, 1894
- Megaphyllum Verhoeff, 1894
- Megaschizophyllum Verhoeff, 1910
- Mesoiulus Berlese, 1886
- Mesomeritius Enghoff, 1990
- Mesomicroiulus Verhoeff, 1929
- Mesopachyiulus Attems, 1902
- Mesoporoiulus Verhoeff, 1905
- Metaiulus Blower & Rolfe, 1956
- Metaleptophyllum
- Microbrachyiulus
- Microiulus
- Micromastigoiulus Verhoeff, 1899
- Micropachyiulus Verhoeff, 1899
- Micropodoiulus Verhoeff, 1893
- Mikropachyiulus
- Nanopachyiulus Attems, 1902
- Neottiulus Loomis, 1972
- Nepalmatoiulus Mauriès, 1983
- Nesopachyiulus
- Olistheroiulus Lohmander, 1936
- Ommatoiulus Latzel, 1884
- Omobrachyiulus Lohmander, 1936
- Oncoiulus
- Ophiiulus
- Ophiulus
- Ophyiulus Berlese, 1884
- Orescioiulus Lohmander, 1936
- Ormeoiulus Verhoeff, 1930
- Ornithoeides Verhoeff, 1941
- Orocylindrus Verhoeff, 1930
- Oroiulus Verhoeff, 1926
- Osellommatoiulus Ceuca, 1974
- Oxyiulus Silvestri, 1896
- Pachiulus
- Pachybrachyiulus
- Pachyiulus Berlese, 1883
- Pachypodoiulus Verhoeff, 1897
- Pacifiiulus Mikhaljova, 1982
- Paectophyllum Verhoeff, 1898
- Palaioiulus
- Parancistrum Verhoeff, 1943
- Parapachyiulus Golovatch, 1979
- Parastenophyllum Verhoeff, 1899
- Paratyphloiulus Mauriès, 1983
- Parviiulus Jawlowski, 1929
- Peltopodoiulus Lohmander, 1933
- Persebrachyiulus Golovatch, 1983
- Phallaioiulus Attems, 1927
- Phalloiulus Brölemann, 1897
- Phauloiulus Attems, 1940
- Phylacodon Attems, 1927
- Phyllommatoiulus Ceuca, 1972
- Plagioncus Attems, 1952
- Pontobrachyiulus Lohmander, 1939
- Porrhoiulus Lohmander, 1936
- Proleptoiulus Verhoeff, 1929
- Promeritoconus Verhoeff, 1943
- Prosthekiulus Attems, 1927
- Pteridiulus
- Pteridoiulus Verhoeff, 1913
- Raulinsia Leach, 1814
- Rhamphidoiulus Attems, 1905
- Rhodopiella Strasser, 1966
- Rossiulus Attems, 1926
- Rumaniulus Attems, 1926
- Sarmatiulus Lohmander, 1927
- Schistocoxitus Attems, 1927
- Schizophyllum
- Serboiulus Strasser, 1962
- Sibiriulus Gulička, 1963
- Smeringolophus Attems, 1959
- Solaenoiulus Schubart, 1932
- Solaenophyllum Verhoeff, 1910
- Spelaeoblaniulus Ceuca, 1956
- Spelaeoiulus
- Stenonia Gray, 1843
- Stenophyllum Verhoeff, 1897
- Stygiiulus Verhoeff, 1929
- Styrioiulus Verhoeff, 1928
- Symphyoiulus Verhoeff, 1898
- Syniulus Strasser, 1974
- Syriobrachyiulus Verhoeff, 1930
- Syrioiulus Verhoeff, 1914
- Tachypodoiulus Verhoeff, 1893
- Taueriulus Verhoeff, 1913
- Telsonius Strasser, 1976
- Thrinaciulus Attems, 1952
- Thylophorus Attems, 1952
- Titanophyllum Akkari, Stoev & Enghoff, 2011
- Trichopachyiulus
- Trogloiulus Manfredi, 1931
- Turboiulus Golovatch, 1979
- Turkoiulus Verhoeff, 1941
- Typhloiulus Latzel, 1884
- Typhlopachyiulus Verhoeff, 1898
- Unciger Brandt, 1841
- Velophyllum Schubart, 1964
- Xestoiulus Verhoeff, 1893
- Xestotyphloiulus Verhoeff, 1899
- Ypsiloniulus Verhoeff, 1899

== Select species ==
Examples of species contained within this family include:

- Brachyiulus pusillus
- Cylindroiulus punctatus
- Tachypodoiulus niger
- Ommatoiulus moreletii
- Ophyiulus pilosus
- Megaphyllum unilineatum
