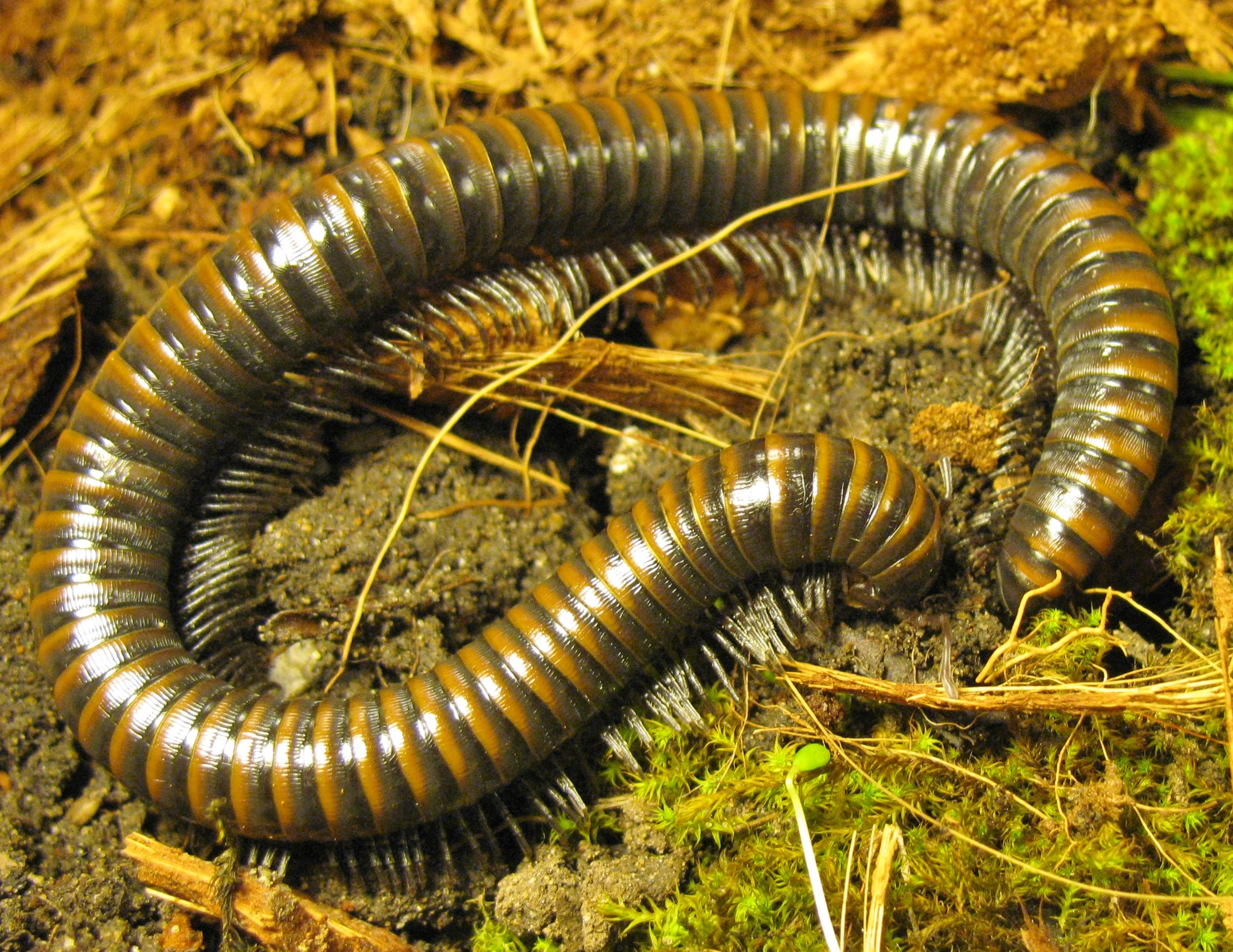
- Paeromopus angusticeps

Scientific classification
- Kingdom: Animalia
- Phylum: Arthropoda
- Subphylum: Myriapoda
- Class: Diplopoda
- Order: Julida
- Family: Paeromopodidae
- Genus: Paeromopus; Karsch, 1881

Type species
- Paeromopus angusticeps Wood, 1864

Species
- Paeromopus angusticeps; Paeromopus cavicolens; Paeromopus eldoradus; Paeromopus paniculus

Synonyms
- Paeromopellus Verhoeff, 1938

= Paeromopus =

Genus of millipedes

Paeromopus is a genus of large cylindrical millipedes endemic to the U.S. state of California. All species exceed 10 centimeters (4 inches) in length, and the largest, P. paniculus, reaching 16.5 cm (6.5 inches) is the longest millipede species in North America. The genus was named by German entomologist Ferdinand Karsch in 1881 and contains four species: three occupying small ranges in the Sierra Nevada mountains and one occupying a large range including the Sierra Nevada and much of Northern California to the Central Coast.

== Description ==
Paeromopus millipedes are long and cylindrical, measuring 10 to 16.5 cm (3.9 to 6.5 in) in length and up to 8 mm (0.3 in) wide, with 68 to 80 body segments. The body color in most is brown to black with bands of light brown or yellow, although some individuals are dark gray or bluish gray with indistinct bands. The legs are relatively long, and the first pair of legs in males is extremely reduced in size. Like other paeromopodids, species of Paeromopus have fine parallel grooves (striae or striations) on each body segment, giving a somewhat roughened appearance.

The simple eyes (ocelli) occur in two patches- one on each side of the head; each patch may include up to 31 ocelli of unequal sizes, arranged in rows.

== Distribution ==
There are four species of Paeromopus. P. angusticeps, divided into two subspecies, has the largest geographical range, occupying much of Northern California in a large arc extending from Monterey County on the central coast, north along the Coast Ranges to Humboldt County, and descending along the Cascades and Sierra Nevada range of eastern California. Each of the remaining three species are known from relatively few locations within the Sierra Nevada .

Species	Taxon author	Geographic range
P. angusticeps	(Wood, 1864)	Northern California, largely absent from Central Valley: from Humboldt County to Monterey County along the Coast Ranges and Shasta County to Tuolumne County along the Cascades and Sierra Nevada.
P. cavicolens	Chamberlin, 1949	Tuolumne County
P. eldoradus	Chamberlin, 1941	El Dorado County
P. paniculus	Shelley & Bauer, 1997	Mariposa County

== Taxonomy ==
The genus Paeromopus was first named in 1881 by German entomologist Ferdinand Karsch, however the earliest-named species now assigned to Paeromopus, P. angusticeps, was described in 1864 by the American naturalist Horatio C Wood under the name Spirobolus angusticeps, based on specimens collected in San Francisco. In 1881 Karsch described a species he named Paeromopus lysiopetalinus, which was the first establishment of the genus "Paeromopous". In 1949, Ralph V. Chamberlin suggested that "S. angusticeps" belonged to the genus Paeromopus, and renamed it P. angusticeps. Subsequently P. lysiopetalinus was recognized as a taxonomic synonym of P. angusticeps- a different name applied to what turned out to be the same species. Paeromopus is now recognized as a member of the family Paeromopodidae in the order Julida, while Spirobolus proper belongs to the family Spirobolidae of the order Spirobolida.

Additional species of paeromopodids were described throughout the 20th century. In 1938, German entomologist Karl Wilhelm Verhoeff described the species Paeromopellus sphinx, and at least eight species of Paeromopus have been proposed, but subsequently several named species and Paeromopellus were brought into synonymy with previously named species, or assigned to the closely related genus Californiulus. The most recently described species was P. paniculus, described in 1997.

The meaning of the name Paeromopus was not specified by Karsch, although the suffix -pus refers to legs.
