= Blaniulus mayeti =

Scientific classification
- Kingdom: Animalia
- Phylum: Arthropoda
- Subphylum: Myriapoda
- Class: Diplopoda
- Order: Julida
- Family: Blaniulidae
- Genus: Blaniulus
- Species: B. mayeti

Binomial name
- Blaniulus mayeti (Brolemann, 1902)

Synonyms
- Typhloblaniulus mayeti Brolemann, 1902

Species of millipede

Blaniulus mayeti is a species of millipede in the Blaniulidae family that is endemic to France.
