= Aprosphylosoma =

Scientific classification
- Kingdom: Animalia
- Phylum: Arthropoda
- Subphylum: Myriapoda
- Class: Diplopoda
- Order: Julida
- Family: Aprosphylosomatidae; Hoffman, 1961
- Genus: Aprosphylosoma; Hoffman, 1961
- Species: A. darceneae

Binomial name
- Aprosphylosoma darceneae Hoffman, 1961

Species of myriapod

Aprosphylosoma darceneae is a species of cylindrical julidan millipede found only in the U.S. state of Oregon and comprising the sole species of the family Aprosphylosomatidae. It is known from only a single known specimen collected from Oregon Caves National Monument in 1956 that measures approximately 16 mm (0.63 in) long and 1 mm wide, possessing 59 body segments. The first pair of legs are extremely reduced into non-jointed, peg-like structures. The body color is yellowish brown with darker brown mottling on the dorsal surface, and the legs are white.

Aprosphylosoma was originally classified as a new distinct subfamily ("Aprosphylosomatinae") of the family Nemasomatidae. Subsequent cladistic analysis placed Aprosphylosoma into the family Paeromopodidae. Further taxonomic study elevated the genus to its own distinct family, Aprosphylosomatidae, which together with Paeromopodidae constitutes the superfamily Paeromopodoidea.
