= Blaniulus troglobius =

Scientific classification
- Kingdom: Animalia
- Phylum: Arthropoda
- Subphylum: Myriapoda
- Class: Diplopoda
- Order: Julida
- Family: Blaniulidae
- Genus: Blaniulus
- Species: B. troglobius

Binomial name
- Blaniulus troglobius Latzel, 1886

Synonyms
- Typhloblaniulus beneharnensis Brolemann, 1921; Typhloblaniulus gibbicollis Brolemann, 1921; Typhloblaniulus paupercula Brolemann, 1921; Blaniulus concolor Brolemann, 1894

Species of millipede

Blaniulus troglobius is a species of millipede in the Blaniulidae family that is endemic to France.
