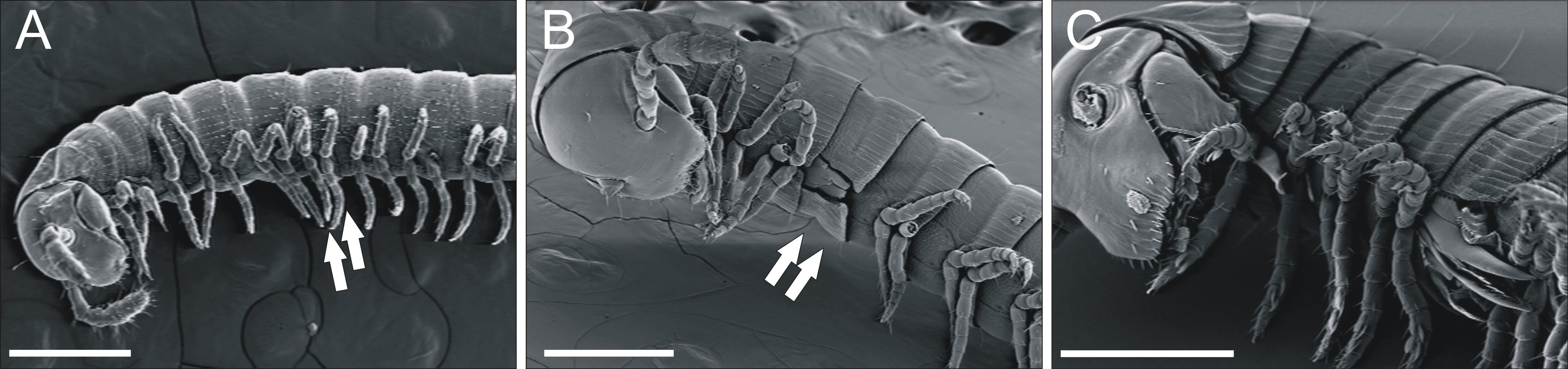

Scientific classification
- Kingdom: Animalia
- Phylum: Arthropoda
- Subphylum: Myriapoda
- Class: Diplopoda
- Order: Julida
- Family: Blaniulidae
- Genus: Nopoiulus
- Species: N. kochii

Binomial name
- Nopoiulus kochii (Gervais, 1847)

= Nopoiulus kochii =

Species of millipede

Nopoiulus kochii is a species of millipede in the genus Nopoiulus. This species is common to Turkey, and has been found living for several years in the intestines of a human.

== Description ==
This millipede is approximately 13 millimetres (0.51 in) long and 2 millimetres (0.079 in) wide. Its body is shaped like a cylinder and is made up of 40 segments. Its antennae have six segments, with the fourth segment being the largest.

== Ecology ==
=== Range ===
Nopoiulus kochii has been found in Turkey, Ireland, Egypt, Serbia, Siberia, Georgia, Armenia, and Azerbaijan.
