= Blaniulus lorifer =

Scientific classification
- Kingdom: Animalia
- Phylum: Arthropoda
- Subphylum: Myriapoda
- Class: Diplopoda
- Order: Julida
- Family: Blaniulidae
- Genus: Blaniulus
- Species: B. lorifer

Binomial name
- Blaniulus lorifer (Brolemann, 1921)

Synonyms
- Typhloblaniulus lorifer Brolemann, 1921; Typhloblaniulus aberrans Brolemann, 1921; Typhloblaniulus apicalis Brolemann, 1921; Typhloblaniulus consoranensis Brolemann, 1921; Typhloblaniulus garumnicus Brolemann, 1921; Typhloblaniulus huescanus Brolemann, 1921

Species of millipede

Blaniulus lorifer is a species of millipede in the Blaniulidae family that can be found in France and Spain.
