= Blaniulus lichtensteini =

Scientific classification
- Kingdom: Animalia
- Phylum: Arthropoda
- Subphylum: Myriapoda
- Class: Diplopoda
- Order: Julida
- Family: Blaniulidae
- Genus: Blaniulus
- Species: B. lichtensteini

Binomial name
- Blaniulus lichtensteini (Brolemann, 1921)

Species of millipede

Blaniulus lichtensteini is a species of millipede in the Blaniulidae family that is endemic to France.
