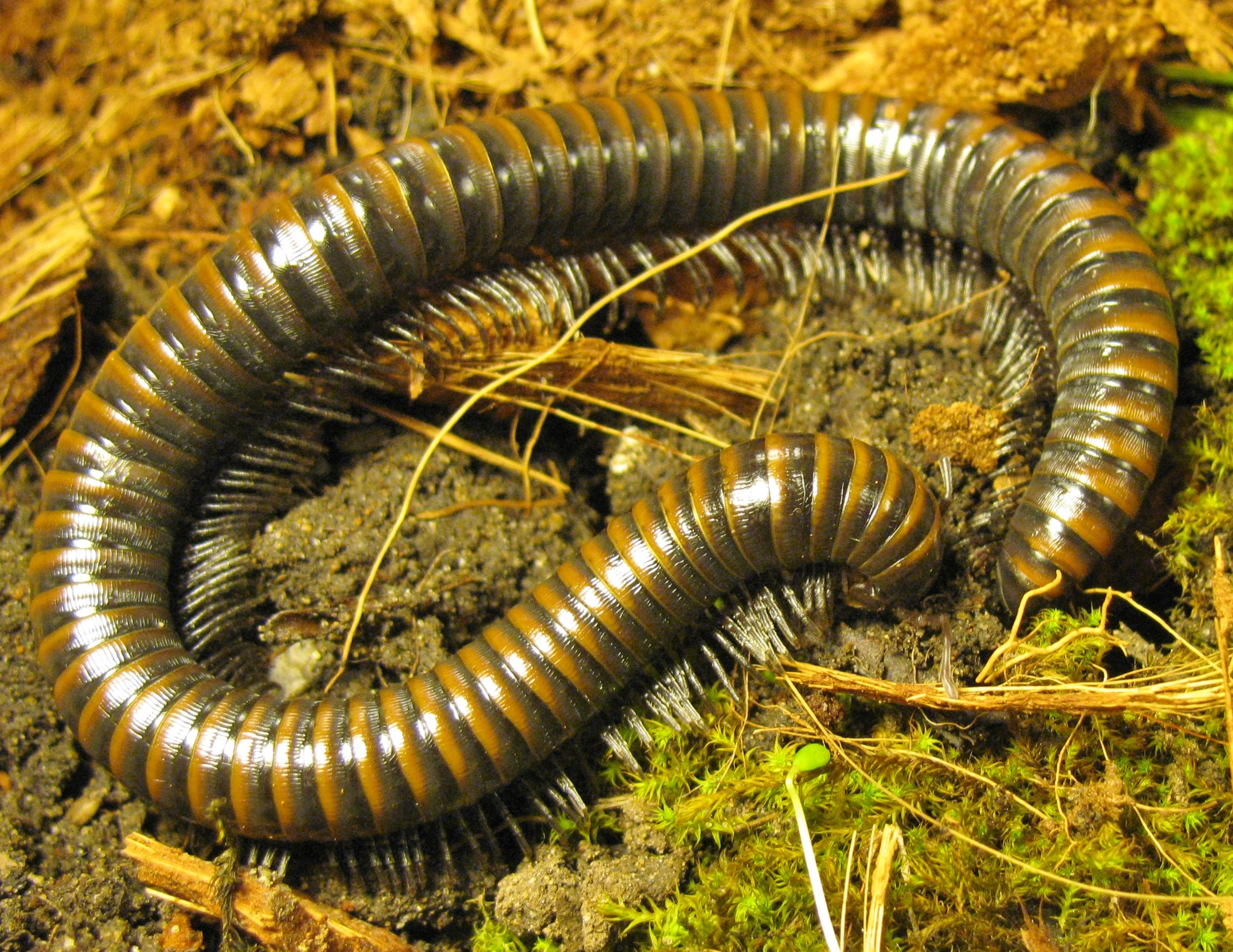

Scientific classification
- Kingdom: Animalia
- Phylum: Arthropoda
- Subphylum: Myriapoda
- Class: Diplopoda
- Order: Julida
- Family: Paeromopodidae
- Genus: Paeromopus
- Species: P. angusticeps

Binomial name
- Paeromopus angusticeps (Wood, 1864)

Subspecies
- Paeromopus angusticeps angusticeps Paeromopus angusticeps buttensis

Synonyms
- Spirobolus angusticeps Wood, 1864; Paeromopus lysiopetalinus Karsch, 1881; Paeromopellus sphinx Verhoeff, 1938; Paeromopus pistus Chamberlin, 1941; Paeromopus buttensis Chamberlin, 1954; Paeromopus ocellatus Loomis, 1972

= Paeromopus angusticeps =

Species of millipede

Paeromopus angusticeps is a species of millipede found in the U.S. state of California. It occupies the largest geographic range of all four species of Paeromopus, occupying much of Northern California in a large arc extending from Monterey County on the central coast, north along the Coast Ranges to Humboldt County, and descending along the Cascades and Sierra Nevada range of eastern California. P. angusticeps is largely absent from California's Central Valley.

== Description ==
Adult P. angusticeps individuals possess up to 80 body segments and range from 100 to 150 mm (3.9 to 5.9 in) long, and 5 to 7 mm (0.20 to 0.28 in) wide. The color pattern consists of alternating bands of brown on a black or blue-black base color, although in some individuals the banding is largely indistinct from the base color. Like other members of the family Paeromopodidae, the exoskeleton is marked with small parallel grooves or striations. Each eye is composed of up to 30 ocelli arranged in a patch on each side of the head.

== Subspecies ==
The populations of Paeromopus angusticeps are divided into two races or subspecies- P. a. angusticeps and P. a. buttensis- based on subtle differences of the gonopods, specialized male reproductive appendages. P. a. angusticeps occurs in the San Francisco and Monterey Bay areas, from Marin to Monterey county, while the more widespread P. a. buttensis occupies the northern and eastern portions of the range. Prior to the 1990s, the two subspecies were regarded as two or more distinct species, but were reduced to subspecific rank with the discovery of intergrade populations in Solano and Sonoma counties that show intermediate morphology.
