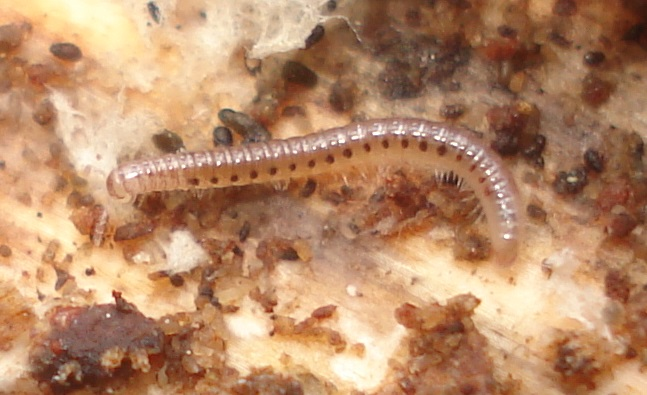

Scientific classification
- Kingdom: Animalia
- Phylum: Arthropoda
- Subphylum: Myriapoda
- Class: Diplopoda
- Order: Julida
- Family: Blaniulidae
- Genus: Proteroiulus
- Species: P. fuscus

Binomial name
- Proteroiulus fuscus (Am Stein, 1857)

Synonyms
- Blaniulus fuscus Am Stein, 1857; Nopoiulus caelebs Verhoeff, 1907

= Proteroiulus fuscus =

Species of millipede

Proteroiulus fuscus is a species of millipede in the family Blaniulidae which can be found everywhere in Europe except for Albania, Andorra, Liechtenstein, Moldova, Monaco, Romania, San Marino, Vatican City, all states of former Yugoslavia and some European islands.

== Description ==
The species' males are 6.5–8.5 millimetres (0.26–0.33 in) long and 0.5–0.7 millimetres (0.020–0.028 in) wide while the females are larger ranging from 7.0–13.4 millimetres (0.28–0.53 in) to 15 millimetres (0.59 in) long by 0.5–0.9 millimetres (0.020–0.035 in) wide. It have dark or brownish coloured ozadenes and have 6–14 setae which is a bit longer than its metazonite.
