= Boreoiulus dollfusi =

Scientific classification
- Kingdom: Animalia
- Phylum: Arthropoda
- Subphylum: Myriapoda
- Class: Diplopoda
- Order: Julida
- Family: Blaniulidae
- Genus: Boreoiulus
- Species: B. dollfusi

Binomial name
- Boreoiulus dollfusi (Brölemann, 1894)

Synonyms
- Blaniulus dollfusi Brölemann, 1894

Species of millipede

Boreoiulus dollfusi is a species of millipede in the Blaniulidae family that can be found in Belgium, France and Spain.
