= Proteroiulus broelemanni =

Scientific classification
- Kingdom: Animalia
- Phylum: Arthropoda
- Subphylum: Myriapoda
- Class: Diplopoda
- Order: Julida
- Family: Blaniulidae
- Genus: Proteroiulus
- Species: P. broelemanni

Binomial name
- Proteroiulus broelemanni Lohmander, 1925

Species of millipede

Proteroiulus broelemanni is a species of millipede in the genus Proteroiulus.
