= Blaniulus orientalis =

Scientific classification
- Kingdom: Animalia
- Phylum: Arthropoda
- Subphylum: Myriapoda
- Class: Diplopoda
- Order: Julida
- Family: Blaniulidae
- Genus: Blaniulus
- Species: B. orientalis

Binomial name
- Blaniulus orientalis (Brolemann, 1921)

Species of millipede

Blaniulus orientalis is a species of millipede in the Blaniulidae family that can be found in France and Spain.
