= Thalassisobates littoralis =

Scientific classification
- Kingdom: Animalia
- Phylum: Arthropoda
- Subphylum: Myriapoda
- Class: Diplopoda
- Order: Julida
- Family: Nemasomatidae
- Genus: Thalassisobates
- Species: T. littoralis

Binomial name
- Thalassisobates littoralis (Silvestri, 1903)

Species of millipede

Thalassisobates littoralis is a species of millipede found in coastal habitats on sand or shingle, often hidden under seaweed.
