= Blaniulus troglodites =

Scientific classification
- Kingdom: Animalia
- Phylum: Arthropoda
- Subphylum: Myriapoda
- Class: Diplopoda
- Order: Julida
- Family: Blaniulidae
- Genus: Blaniulus
- Species: B. troglodites

Binomial name
- Blaniulus troglodites Brolemann, 1898

Synonyms
- Blaniulus eulophus Silvestri, 1903

Species of millipede

Blaniulus troglodites is a species of millipede in the Blaniulidae family that can be found in France, Spain, and on the island of Sardinia.
