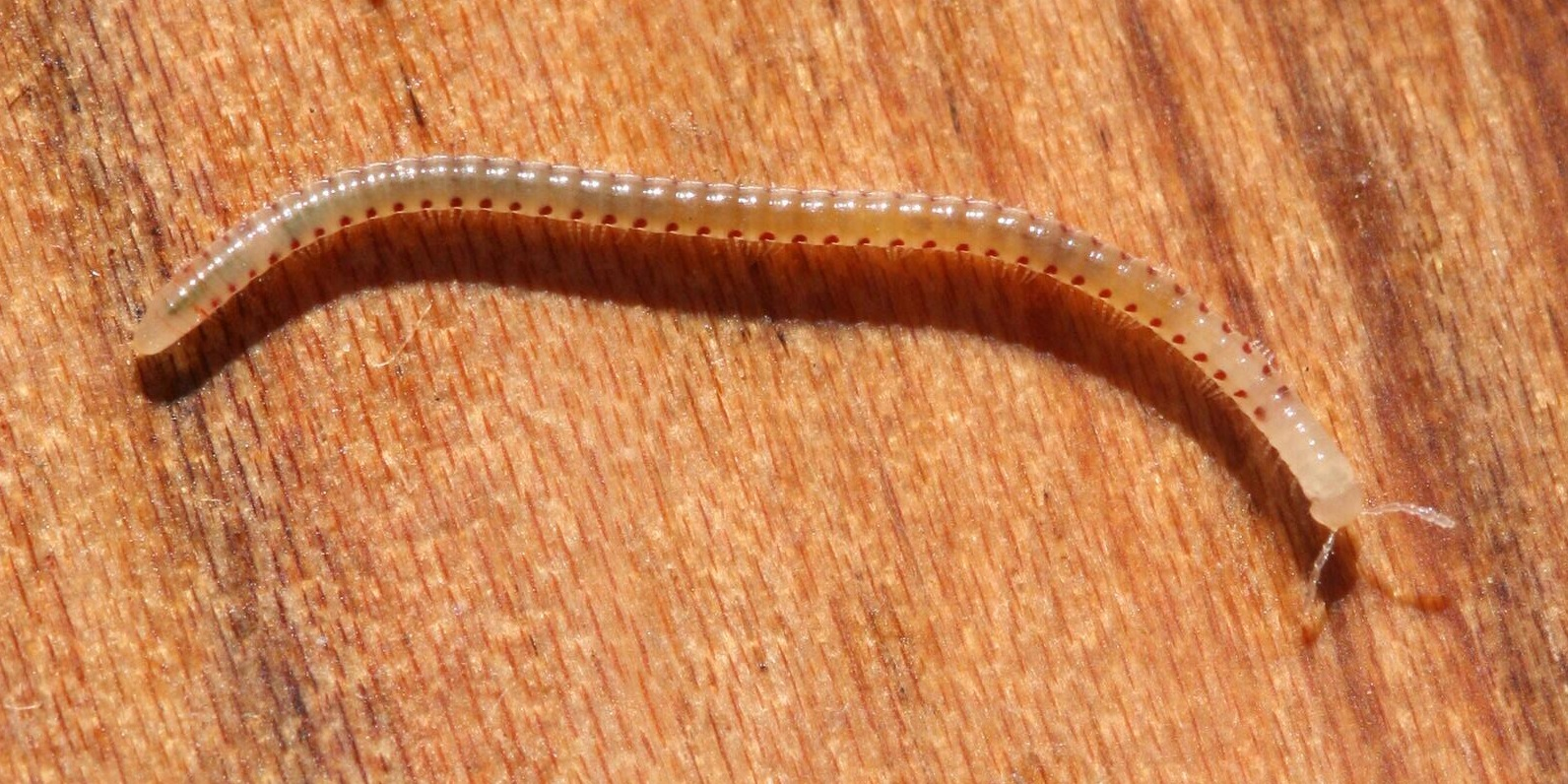
- Blaniulus guttulatus

Scientific classification
- Kingdom: Animalia
- Phylum: Arthropoda
- Subphylum: Myriapoda
- Class: Diplopoda
- Order: Julida
- Family: Blaniulidae
- Genus: Blaniulus; Gervais, 1836

= Blaniulus =

Genus of millipedes

Blaniulus is a genus of millipedes containing the following species:

- Blaniulus atticus Verhoeff, 1925
- Blaniulus concolor Brölemann, 1894
- Blaniulus drahoni Giard, 1899
- Blaniulus eulophus Silvestri, 1903
- Blaniulus fuscopunctatus Lucas, 1846
- Blaniulus guttulatus (Bosc, 1792)
- Blaniulus lichtensteini Brölemann, 1921
- Blaniulus lorifer Brölemann, 1921
- Blaniulus mayeti (Brölemann, 1902)
- Blaniulus orientalis Brölemann, 1921
- Blaniulus pallidus Fedrizzi, 1878
- Blaniulus troglobius Latzel, 1886
- Blaniulus troglodites Brölemann, 1898
- Blaniulus velatus Ribaut, 1954
- Blaniulus virei Brölemann, 1900
