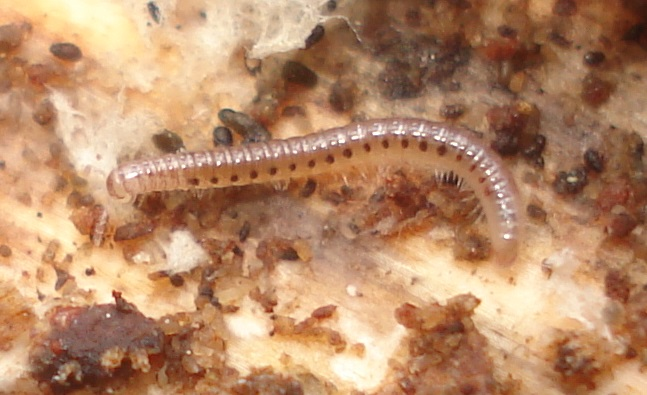
- Proteroiulus fuscus

Scientific classification
- Kingdom: Animalia
- Phylum: Arthropoda
- Subphylum: Myriapoda
- Class: Diplopoda
- Order: Julida
- Family: Blaniulidae
- Genus: Proteroiulus; Silvestri, 1897

= Proteroiulus =

Genus of millipedes

Proteroiulus is a genus of millipedes in the family Blaniulidae, containing the following species:

- Proteroiulus broelemanni Lohmander, 1925
- Proteroiulus fuscus (Am Stein, 1857)
- Proteroiulus hispanus Schubart, 1959
