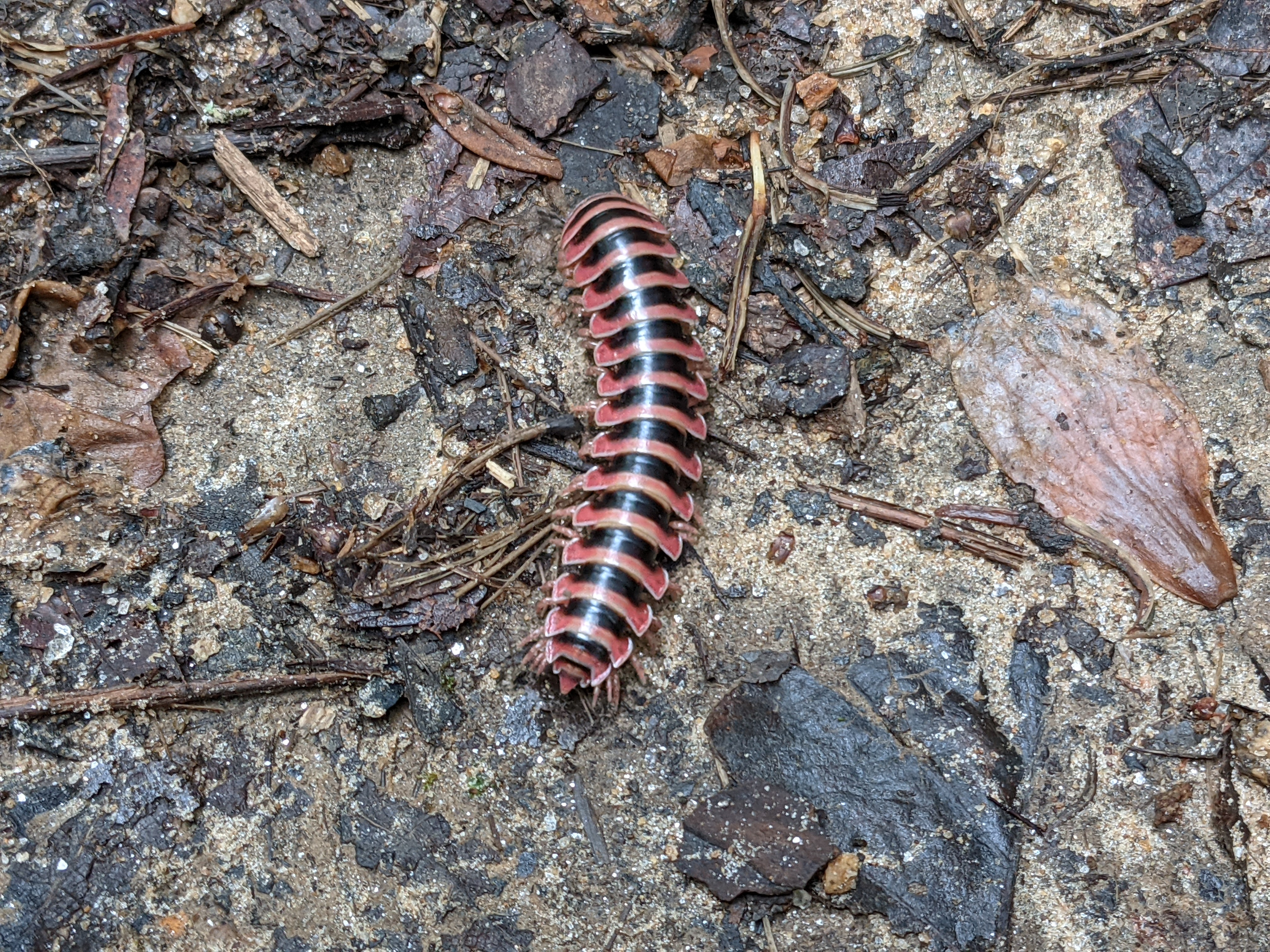

Scientific classification
- Kingdom: Animalia
- Phylum: Arthropoda
- Subphylum: Myriapoda
- Class: Diplopoda
- Order: Polydesmida
- Family: Xystodesmidae
- Genus: Semionellus
- Species: S. placidus

Binomial name
- Semionellus placidus (Wood, 1864)

= Semionellus placidus =

Species of millipede

Semionellus placidus is a species of flat-backed millipede in the family Xystodesmidae. It is found in North America.
