= Paeromopus paniculus =

Scientific classification
- Domain: Eukaryota
- Kingdom: Animalia
- Phylum: Arthropoda
- Subphylum: Myriapoda
- Class: Diplopoda
- Order: Julida
- Family: Paeromopodidae
- Genus: Paeromopus
- Species: P. paniculus

Binomial name
- Paeromopus paniculus Shelley & Bauer, 1997

Species of millipede

Paeromopus paniculus is a species of millipede endemic to the Sierra Nevada mountains in the United States state of California. Reaching up to 16.5 centimeters (6.5 inches) in length, it is the longest known millipede in North America.

== Description ==
P. paniculus is bluish gray in color with very faint bands. The body possesses around 75 segments ("rings") at maturity, and adults measure 6.5 mm (0.26 in) wide and 8 to 15 cm (3.1 to 5.9 in) long, with the longest known specimen reaching a length of 16.5 cm (6.5 in). Like other members of the family Paeromopodidae, each body ring is marked with small parallel grooves running lengthwise, and mature males have two pair of modified legs (gonopods) on the seventh body segment (not including the head) that are used in mating.

== Distribution and habitat ==
P. paniculus lives in the Sierra Nevada mountains of California, and has mainly been found within Yosemite National Park and other parts of Mariposa County. P. paniculus is the southernmost species of Paeromopus in the Sierra Nevada. Little is known of its ecology but P. paniculus has been found in moist microhabitats under dead logs and bark and is known to co-occur with Californiulus yosemitensis, another member of the Paeromopodidae, which is distinguished from P. paniculus by having a broad yellow dorsal stripe with a black line down the middle.

== Discovery ==
Although formally described in 1997, the first specimens were collected as early as 1952. The holotype is a male collected in 1969 and is housed in the Bohart Museum of Entomology at the University of California, Davis. The specific epithet (species name), paniculus, means "tuft" in Latin, referring to a tuft of small spines on the hind gonopods that distinguishes P. paniculus from its northern relative, P. eldoradus.

== See also ==
- Ecology of the Sierra Nevada
- Ecology of California
