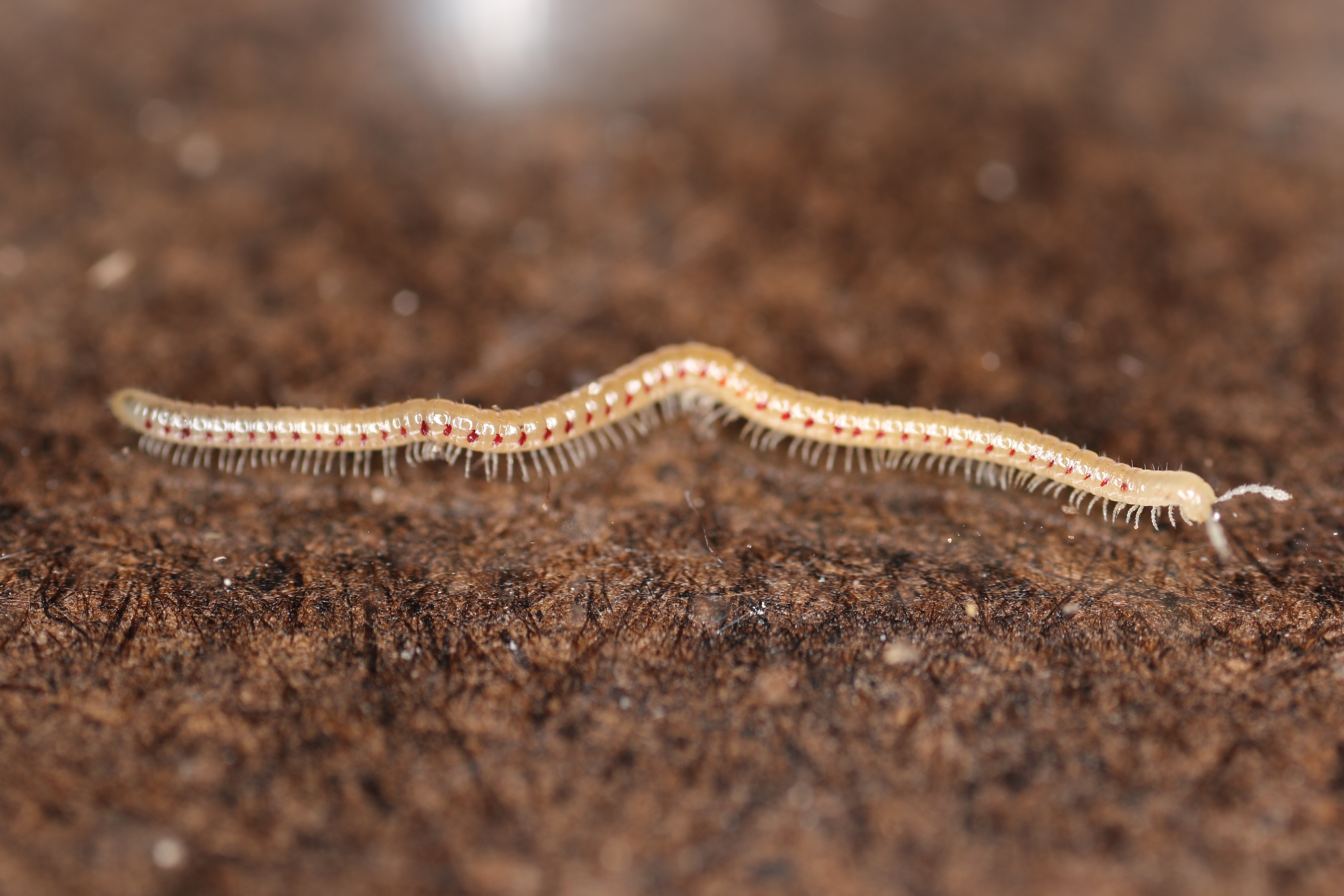

Scientific classification
- Domain: Eukaryota
- Kingdom: Animalia
- Phylum: Arthropoda
- Subphylum: Myriapoda
- Class: Diplopoda
- Order: Julida
- Family: Blaniulidae
- Genus: Blaniulus
- Species: B. guttulatus

Binomial name
- Blaniulus guttulatus (Fabricius, 1798)

Synonyms
- Julus guttulatus Fabricius, 1798

= Blaniulus guttulatus =

Species of millipede

Blaniulus guttulatus, commonly known as the spotted snake millipede is a species of millipede in the family Blaniulidae that can be found in Central and Western Europe (except for Portugal). It has been introduced in North American countries such as the United States, Canada, Saint Helena, and Tristan da Cunha, as well as Tasmania and Norfolk Island, Australia.

== Description ==
The spotted snake millipede is long and thin, with a whitish or cream-coloured body and conspicuous deep red spots (ozadenes) on each segment. The males are typically 8–12 millimetres (0.31–0.47 in) long and 0.4 millimetres (0.016 in) wide but are sometimes up to 14 millimetres (0.55 in) long and 0.6 millimetres (0.024 in) in width. Females are slightly larger, ranging from 12–15 millimetres (0.47–0.59 in) by 0.5 millimetres (0.020 in) to 9–16 millimetres (0.35–0.63 in) by 0.7 millimetres (0.028 in). It lacks eyes, and has short setae on the dorsal margin of each segment.

== Ecology ==
This species is common in gardens and cultivated areas in Europe and North America, where it has become nearly ubiquitous. It feeds on sugar beets and other crops, and can become an agricultural pest in prolonged drought conditions. The species spends 3 years as a nymph. Males mature at an earlier stage than females.
