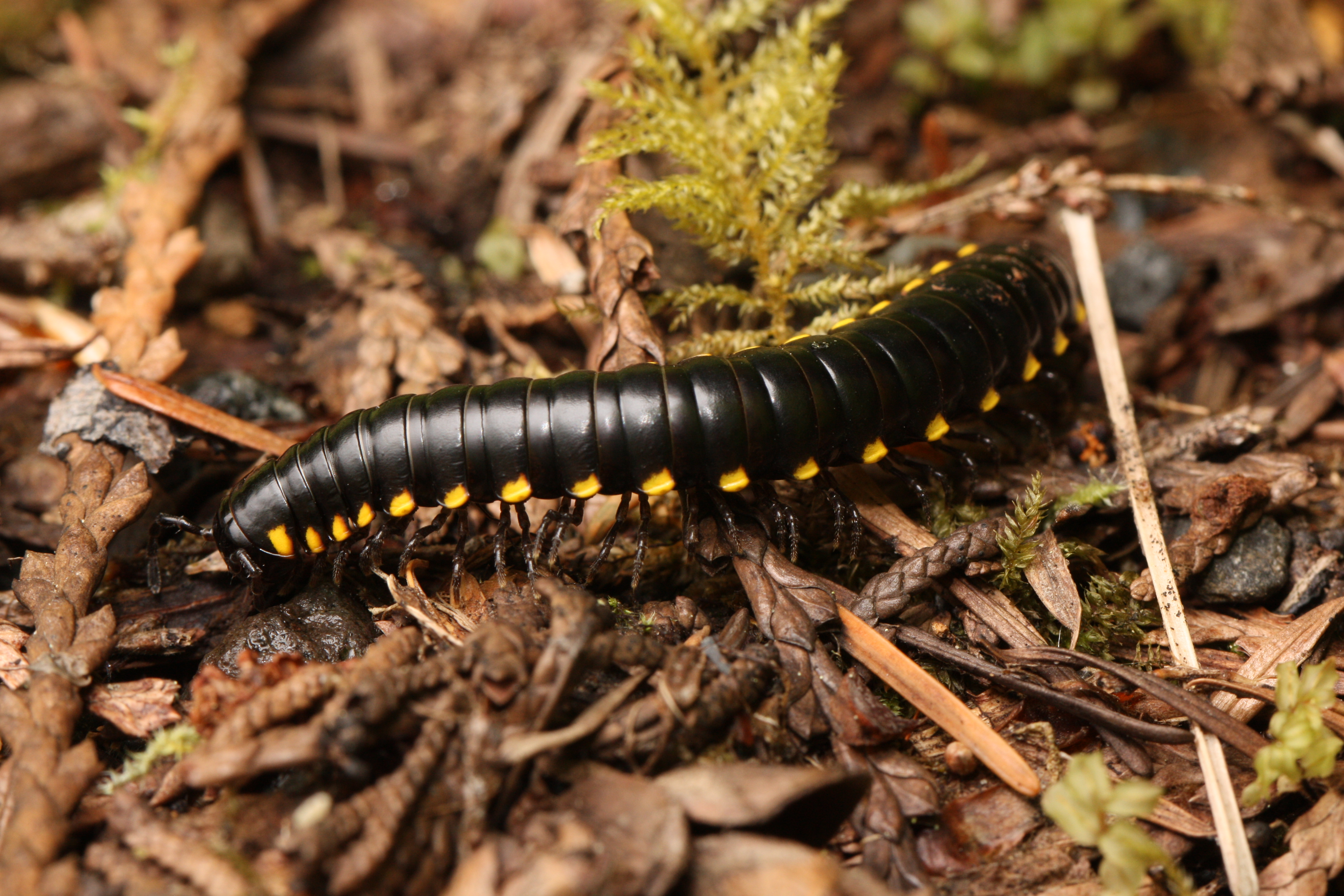
- Harpaphe haydeniana

Scientific classification
- Kingdom: Animalia
- Phylum: Arthropoda
- Subphylum: Myriapoda
- Class: Diplopoda
- Order: Polydesmida
- Family: Xystodesmidae
- Subfamily: Xystodesminae
- Tribe: Xystodesmini
- Genus: Harpaphe; Cook, 1904

Type species
- Polydesmus haydenianus Wood, 1864

Species
- Harpaphe haydeniana Harpaphe pottera Harpaphe telodonta

= Harpaphe =

Genus of millipedes

Harpaphe is a genus of flat-backed millipedes native to the Pacific Northwest of North America. The genus contains three described species: two occurring only in northern California, and one with a large range extending from Southeast Alaska to Central California.

== Species ==
Harpaphe haydeniana, the widest-ranging species, is divided into six subspecies distinguished by geography and subtle differences in color and morphology. H. hayedniana spans the range of Harpaphe, occurring from Monterey County, California to Southeast Alaska. Harpaphe pottera occurs in Mendocino and Humboldt counties in northern California, while Harpaphe telodonta occurs in Humboldt and Del Norte counties, California.
