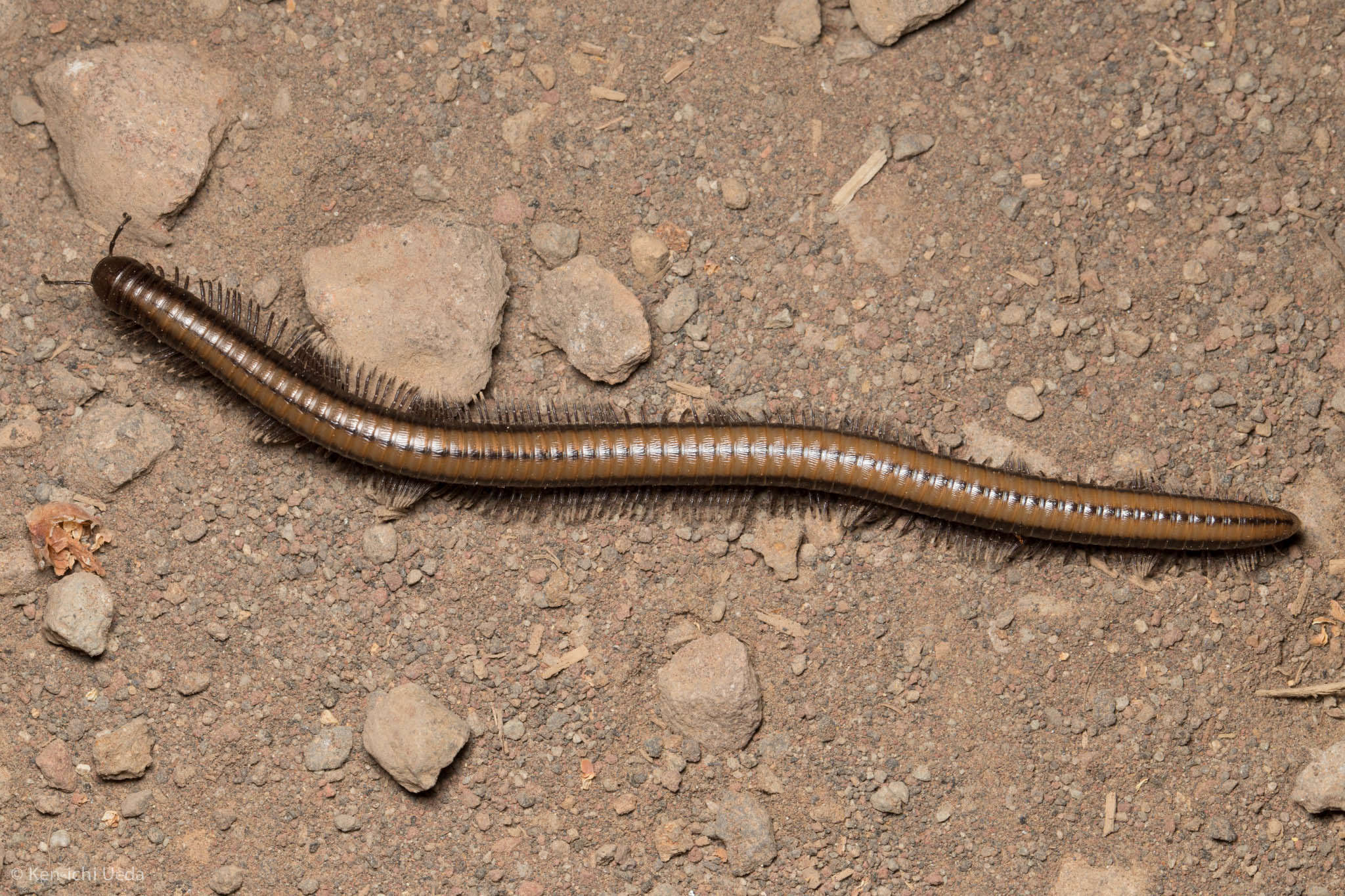

Scientific classification
- Kingdom: Animalia
- Phylum: Arthropoda
- Subphylum: Myriapoda
- Class: Diplopoda
- Order: Julida
- Family: Paeromopodidae
- Genus: Californiulus
- Species: C. yosemitensis

Binomial name
- Californiulus yosemitensis Chamberlin, 1941

Synonyms
- Klansolus monoensis; Klansolus mononus; Klansolus obscurans; Klansolus yosemitensis

= Californiulus yosemitensis =

Species of millipede

Californiulus yosemitensis is a species of cylindrical millipede in the family Paeromopodidae that is found in western North America: predominantly in the Sierra Nevada of California but also extending into southeastern Oregon and parts of Nevada.

== Description ==
Adult C. yosemitensis reach lengths of up to 11 cm (4.3 in) and up to 80 body segments. The species is characterized by a broad yellow or orange dorsal band that extends from the collum (first body segment) to the telson, with a bold black stripe down the middle of the band. The base body color is black. The simple eyes (ocelli) are arranged in patches on each side of the head, each patch consists of four rows of ocelli.

== Distribution ==
Californiulus yosemitensis occurs from extreme southwest Oregon to Kern County, California, with populations in the Warner Mountains, Cascade Range, and Sierra Nevada. It is the most widespread species of Californiulus and is common throughout its range.

== Ecology ==
Californiulus yosemitensis is found under logs in relatively dry habitats, and is occasionally in moist habitats. In certain parts of Yosemite National Park C. yosemitensis co-occurs with Paeromopus paniculus, a larger member of the family Paeromopodidae.

== Discovery ==
Californiulus yosemitensis was described by biologist Ralph Vary Chamberlin in 1941. The holotype specimen was collected in Yosemite in 1931 and is stored in the National Museum of Natural History in Washington, D.C. Chamberlin later described two species Klansolus mononus and K. obscurans, which were subsequently determined to be the same species as, and thus taxonomic synonyms of, C. yosemitensis.
