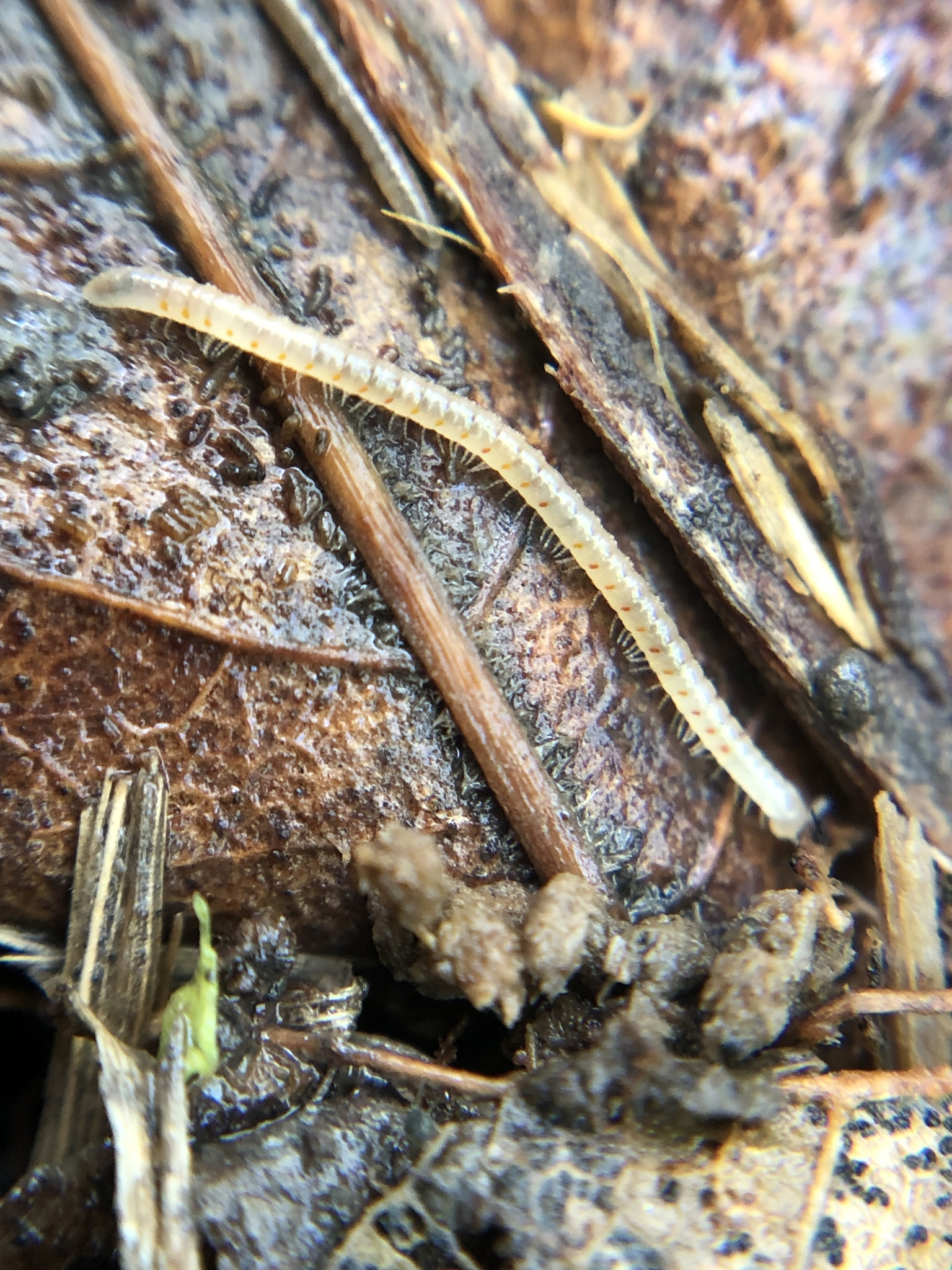
- Archiboreoiulus pallidus

Scientific classification
- Kingdom: Animalia
- Phylum: Arthropoda
- Subphylum: Myriapoda
- Class: Diplopoda
- Order: Julida
- Family: Blaniulidae
- Genus: Archiboreoiulus; Brölemann, 1921

= Archiboreoiulus =

Genus of arthropods

Archiboreoiulus is a genus of millipedes belonging to the family Blaniulidae.

The species of this genus are found in Europe.

== Species ==
The following species are recognised in the genus Archiboreoiulus:

- Archiboreoiulus lutescens Schubart, 1934
- Archiboreoiulus pallidus (Brade-Birks, 1920)
- Archiboreoiulus serbansarbui Giurginca, Vanoaica, Sustr & Tajovsky, 2020
- Archiboreoiulus spec Brolemann, 1921
- Archiboreoiulus sollaudi Brölemann, 1921
