= Thalassisobates =

Scientific classification
- Kingdom: Animalia
- Phylum: Arthropoda
- Subphylum: Myriapoda
- Class: Diplopoda
- Order: Julida
- Family: Nemasomatidae
- Genus: Thalassisobates; Verhoeff, 1908

Genus of millipedes

Thalassisobates is a genus of millipedes.

Species:

- Thalassisobates almeriensis Enghoff, 2013
- Thalassisobates emesesensis Enghoff, 2013
- Thalassisobates littoralis (Silvestri, 1903)
