= Nopoiulus =

Scientific classification
- Domain: Eukaryota
- Kingdom: Animalia
- Phylum: Arthropoda
- Subphylum: Myriapoda
- Class: Diplopoda
- Order: Julida
- Family: Blaniulidae
- Genus: Nopoiulus; Menge, 1851

Genus of many-legged arthropods

Nopoiulus is a genus of millipedes belonging to the family Blaniulidae.

The species of this genus are found in Europe and Northern America.

Species:

- Nopoiulus ammonites Enghoff, 1984
- Nopoiulus kochii (Gervais, 1847)
