= Boreoiulus =

Scientific classification
- Kingdom: Animalia
- Phylum: Arthropoda
- Subphylum: Myriapoda
- Class: Diplopoda
- Order: Julida
- Family: Blaniulidae
- Genus: Boreoiulus; Brölemann, 1921

Genus of millipedes

Boreoiulus is a genus of millipedes in the family Blaniulidae, containing the following species:

- Boreoiulus dollfusi (Brölemann, 1894)
- Boreoiulus simplex Brölemann, 1921
- Boreoiulus tenuis (Bigler, 1913)
