= Nemasoma =

Scientific classification
- Kingdom: Animalia
- Phylum: Arthropoda
- Subphylum: Myriapoda
- Class: Diplopoda
- Order: Julida
- Family: Nemasomatidae
- Genus: Nemasoma; Koch, 1847

Genus of millipedes

Nemasoma is a genus of millipedes belonging to the family Nemasomatidae.

The species of this genus are found in Europe.

Species:

- Nemasoma leechi Chamberlin, 1951
- Nemasoma pium Chamberlin, 1918
