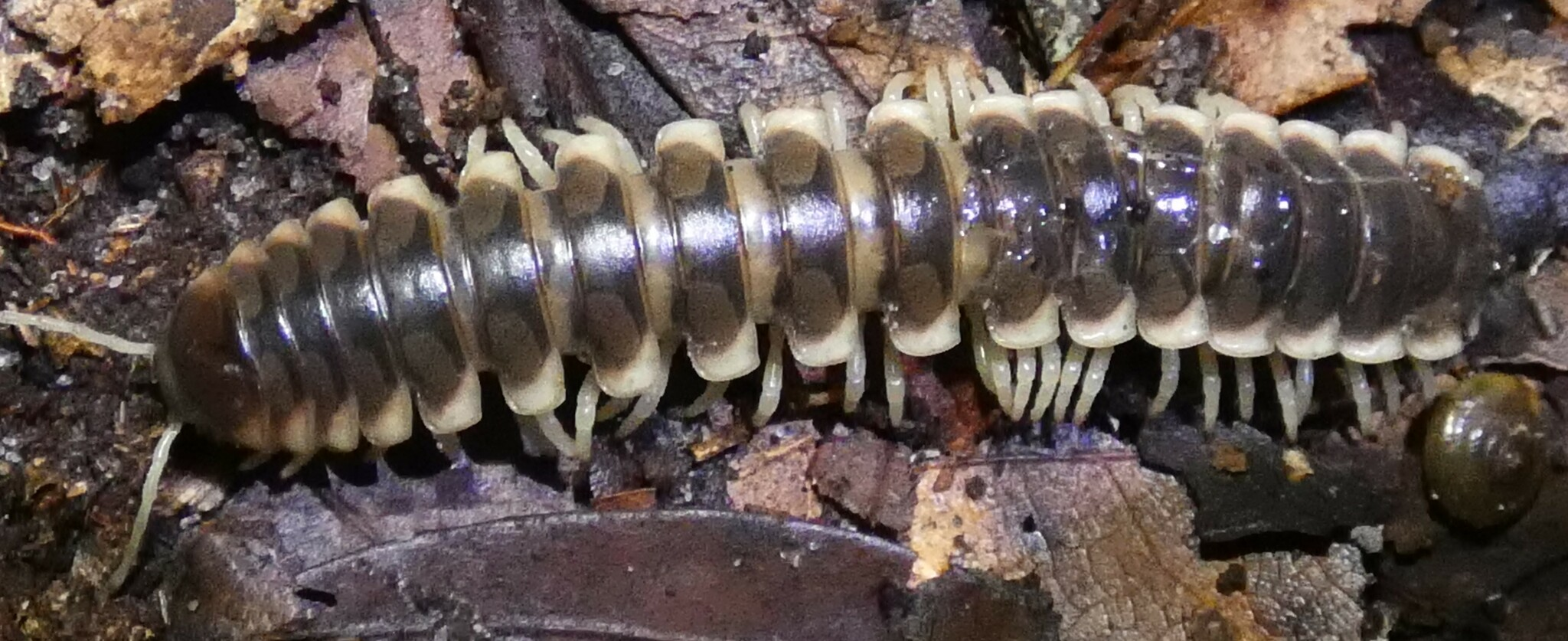
- P. crassicutis incursus

Scientific classification
- Kingdom: Animalia
- Phylum: Arthropoda
- Subphylum: Myriapoda
- Class: Diplopoda
- Order: Polydesmida
- Family: Xystodesmidae
- Genus: Pachydesmus
- Species: P. crassicutis

Binomial name
- Pachydesmus crassicutis (Wood, 1864)

= Pachydesmus crassicutis =

Species of millipede

Pachydesmus crassicutis is a species of flat-backed millipede in the family Xystodesmidae. It is found in North America.

== Subspecies ==
These eight subspecies belong to the species Pachydesmus crassicutis:

- Pachydesmus crassicutis adsinicolus Hoffman, 1958
- Pachydesmus crassicutis crassicutis (Wood, 1864)
- Pachydesmus crassicutis denticulatus Chamberlin, 1946
- Pachydesmus crassicutis duplex Chamberlin, 1939
- Pachydesmus crassicutis hubrichti Hoffman, 1958
- Pachydesmus crassicutis incursus Chamberlin, 1939
- Pachydesmus crassicutis laticollis (Attems, 1899)
- Pachydesmus crassicutis retrorsus Chamberlin, 1921
