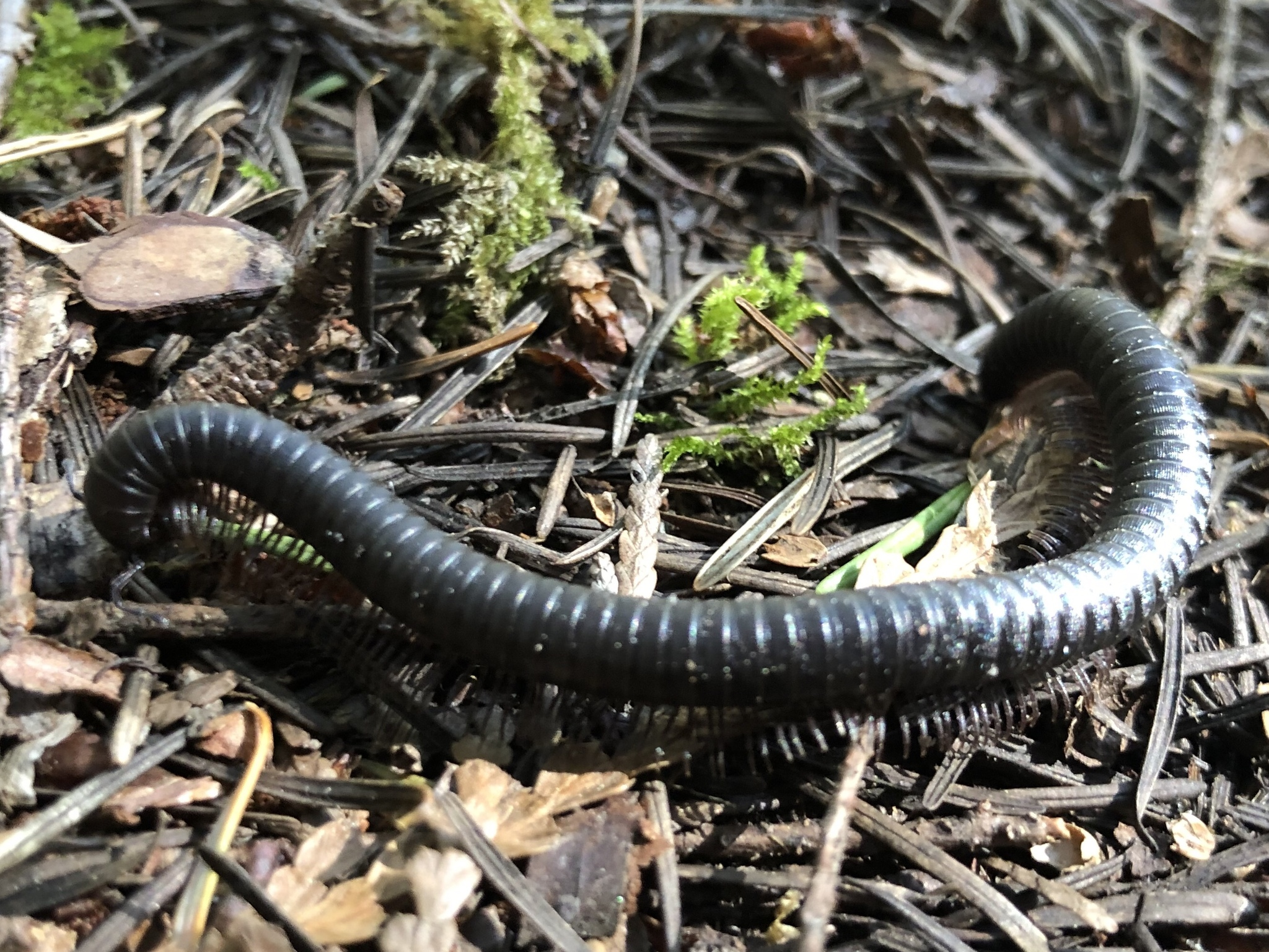

Scientific classification
- Kingdom: Animalia
- Phylum: Arthropoda
- Subphylum: Myriapoda
- Class: Diplopoda
- Order: Julida
- Family: Paeromopodidae
- Genus: Californiulus
- Species: C. euphanus

Binomial name
- Californiulus euphanus (Chamberlin, 1938)

Synonyms
- Klansolus euphanus Chamberlin

= Californiulus euphanus =

Species of millipede

Californiulus euphanus is a millipede that lives in the north-western United States (Oregon and Washington).
