= Trichoblaniulidae =

Scientific classification
- Kingdom: Animalia
- Phylum: Arthropoda
- Subphylum: Myriapoda
- Class: Diplopoda
- Order: Julida
- Family: Trichoblaniulidae

Family of millipedes

Trichoblaniulidae is a family of millipedes belonging to the order Julida.

Genera:

- Cryptoporobates Brölemann, 1921
- Trichoblaniulus Verhoeff, 1898
