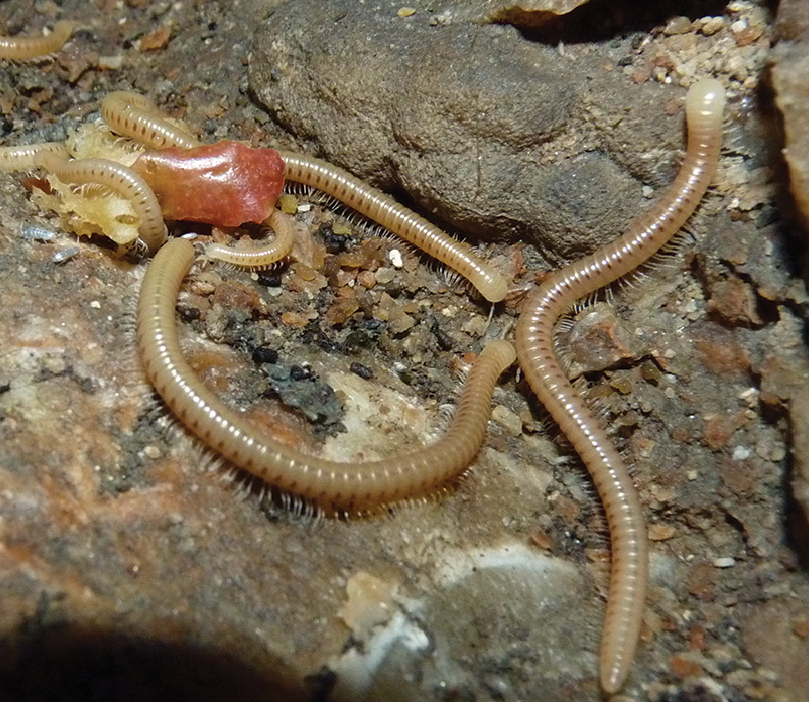
- Cave millipedes

Scientific classification
- Kingdom: Animalia
- Phylum: Arthropoda
- Subphylum: Myriapoda
- Class: Diplopoda
- Order: Julida
- Family: Mongoliulidae

= Mongoliulidae =

Family of millipedes

Mongoliulidae is a millipede family within the Julida order.

== Genera ==
Genera:

- Ansiulus Takakuwa, 1940
- Ikahoiulus Takakuwa, 1941
- Koiulus
