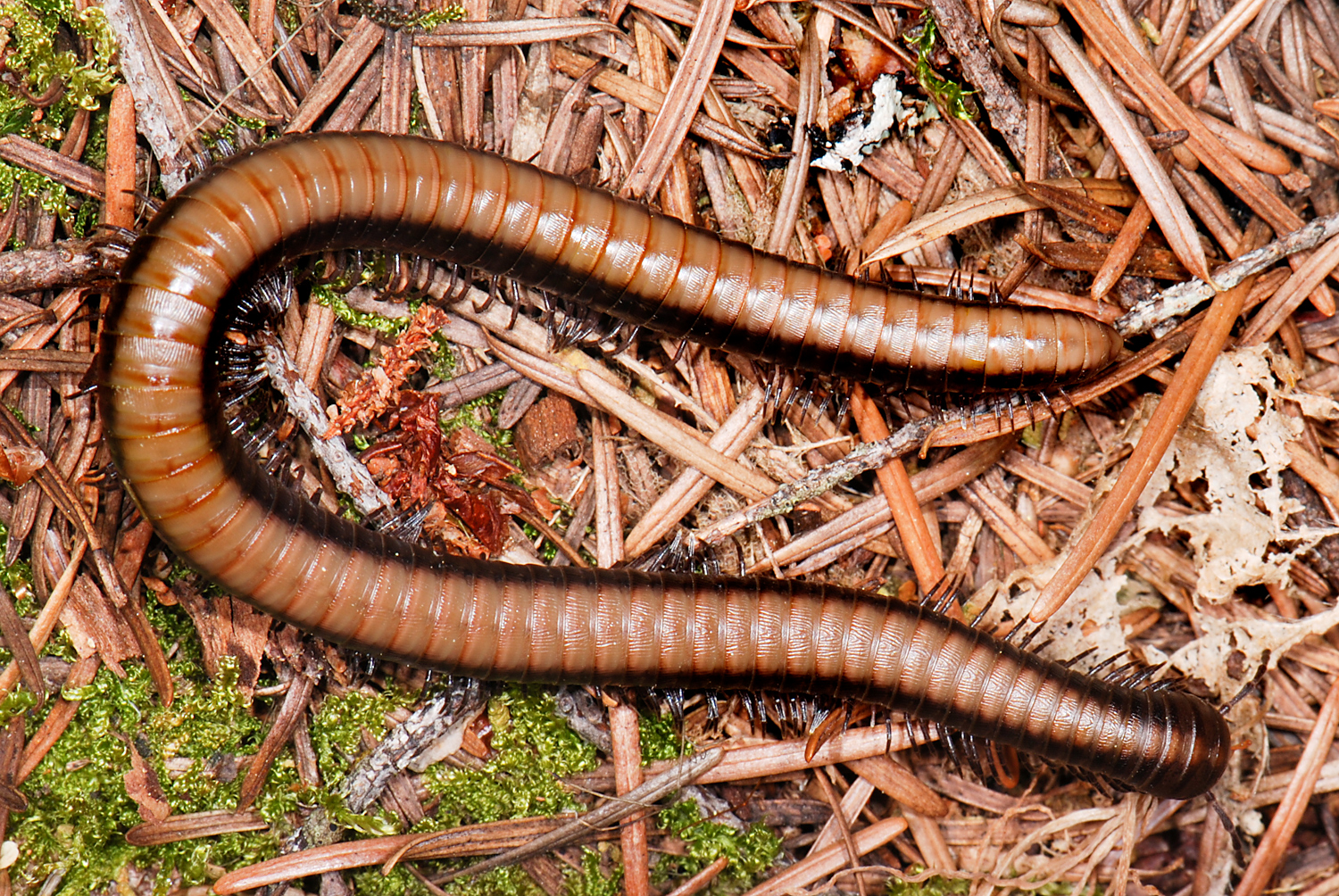
- Californiulus chamberlini

Scientific classification
- Kingdom: Animalia
- Phylum: Arthropoda
- Subphylum: Myriapoda
- Class: Diplopoda
- Order: Julida
- Family: Paeromopodidae
- Genus: Californiulus; Verhoeff, 1895

Type species
- C. dorsovittatus

Species
- 6; see text

Synonyms
- Klansolus Chamberlin, 1938; Aigon Chamberlin, 1949; Atopolus Chamberlin, 1949

= Californiulus =

Genus of millipedes

Californiulus is a genus of cylindrical millipedes containing six species native to the western United States.

== Description ==
Species of Californiulus exhibit two major color patterns. Some are characterized by a broad stripe of light brown, orange or yellow extending down the dorsal surface, while others are banded in light brown against a dark gray or black base color. Adult individuals range from 5 to 11 cm (2 to 4.5 in) long and up to 4.7 mm wide.

== Distribution ==
The constituent species of Californiulus range from northern Washington south to Death Valley, California, and one species occurs separate from the others in a range from extreme eastern Oregon to Montana.

| Species | Taxon author | Geographic range |
|---|---|---|
| C. blechrostriatus | Shelley & Bauer, 1997 | Death Valley |
| C. chamberlini | (Brolemann, 1922) | Southern Oregon to Northern California |
| C. dorsovittatus | Verhoeff, 1895 | Northern California |
| C. euphanus | (Chamberlin, 1938) | Western Washington to northwest Oregon |
| C. parvior | (Chamberlin, 1940) | Extreme northeast Oregon through the Idaho Panhandle to western Montana |
| C. yosemitensis | Chamberlin, 1941 | Southeast Oregon to Kern County, California, with populations in the Warner Mountains, Cascade Range, and Sierra Nevada. |
