= Okeanobatidae =

Scientific classification
- Kingdom: Animalia
- Phylum: Arthropoda
- Subphylum: Myriapoda
- Class: Diplopoda
- Order: Julida
- Family: Okeanobatidae

Family of millipedes

Okeanobatidae is a family of millipedes belonging to the order Julida.

Genera:

- Okeanobates Verhoeff, 1939
- Yosidaiulus Takakuwa, 1940
