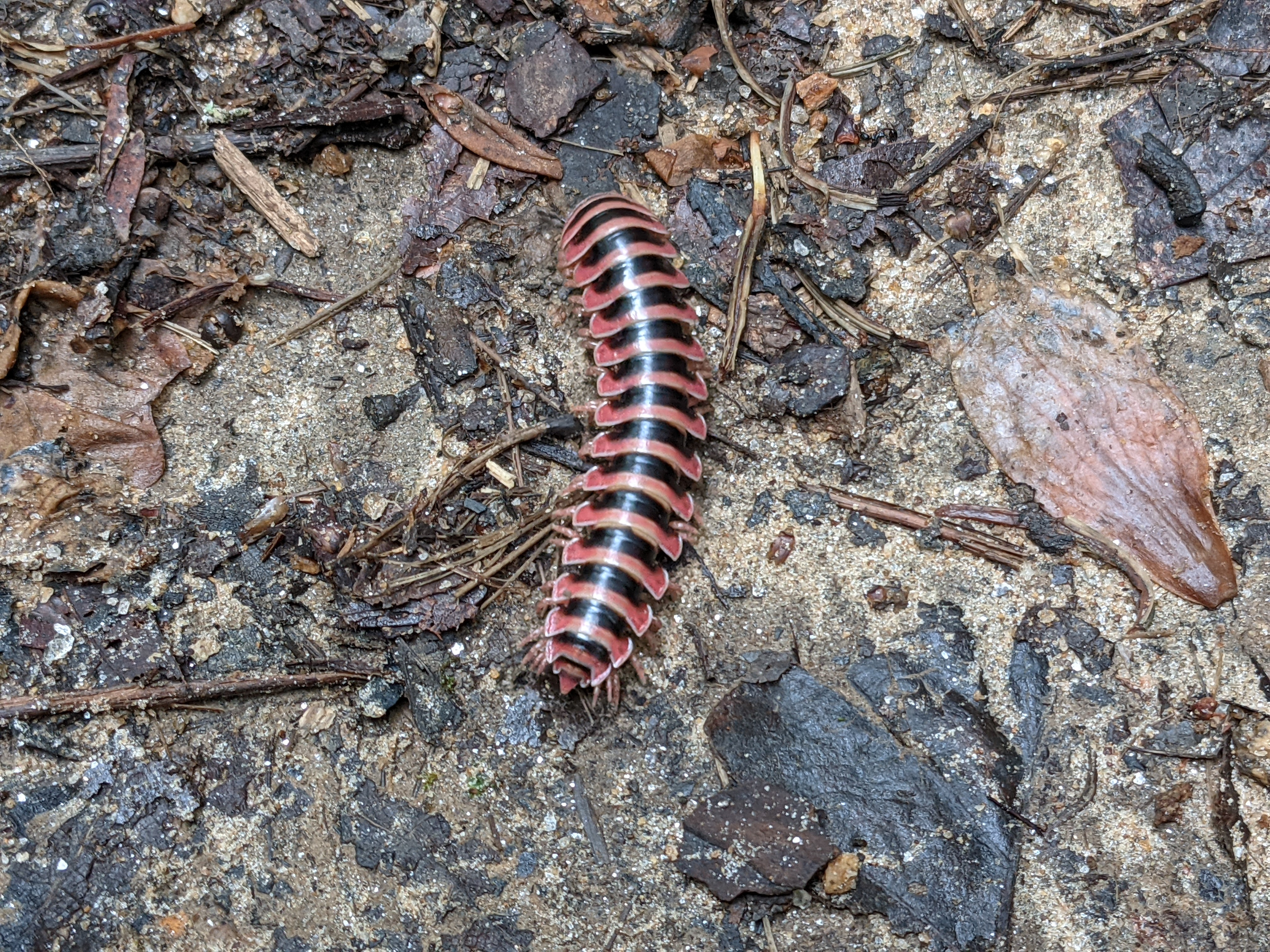
- Semionellus placidus

Scientific classification
- Kingdom: Animalia
- Phylum: Arthropoda
- Subphylum: Myriapoda
- Class: Diplopoda
- Order: Polydesmida
- Family: Xystodesmidae
- Tribe: Chonaphini
- Genus: Semionellus; Chamberlin, 1920

= Semionellus =

Genus of millipedes

Semionellus is a genus of flat-backed millipedes in the family Xystodesmidae. There are at least three described species in Semionellus.

== Species ==
These three species belong to the genus Semionellus:

- Semionellus michiganus (Chamberlin, 1946)
- Semionellus placidus (Wood, 1864)
- Semionellus tertius Chamberlin, 1948
