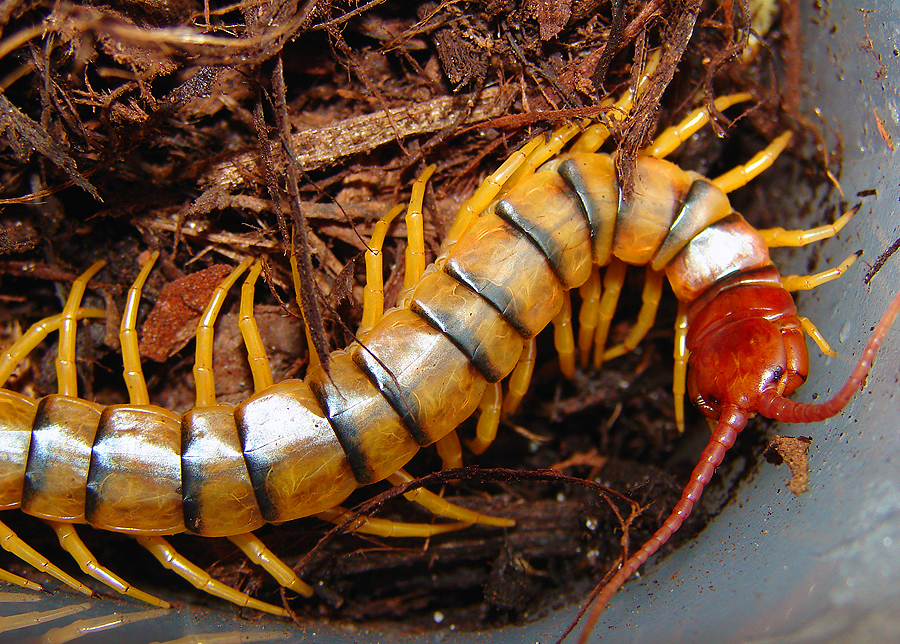

Scientific classification
- Kingdom: Animalia
- Phylum: Arthropoda
- Subphylum: Myriapoda
- Class: Chilopoda
- Order: Scolopendromorpha
- Family: Scolopendridae
- Genus: Scolopendra
- Species: S. polymorpha

Binomial name
- Scolopendra polymorpha Wood, 1861

= Scolopendra polymorpha =

Species of centipede

Scolopendra polymorpha, the common desert centipede, tiger centipede, banded desert centipede, or Sonoran Desert centipede, is a centipede species found in western North America.

== Description ==
Their bodies generally reach 4–7 in (10–18 cm) in length. Coloration is variable, hence the species name polymorpha which means "many forms", and alternative common names like "multicolored centipede". The body segments have one dark lateral stripe, so they are also known as the tiger centipede or tiger-striped centipede. Generally, this species has a darker brown-, red-, or orange-colored head and lighter brown, tan, or orange body segments with yellow legs. However, some populations, such as those in Southern California, may be entirely light blue with indigo stripes, with turquoise legs. Its antennae have seven or more smooth segments.

== Distribution and habitat ==
S. polymorpha is indigenous to the Southwestern United States and northern Mexico, north to the Pacific coast. It inhabits dry grasslands, forest, and desert; in these habitats, the centipedes generally take up residence under rocks, though they have been observed creating burrows in suitable environments and inside rotting logs.

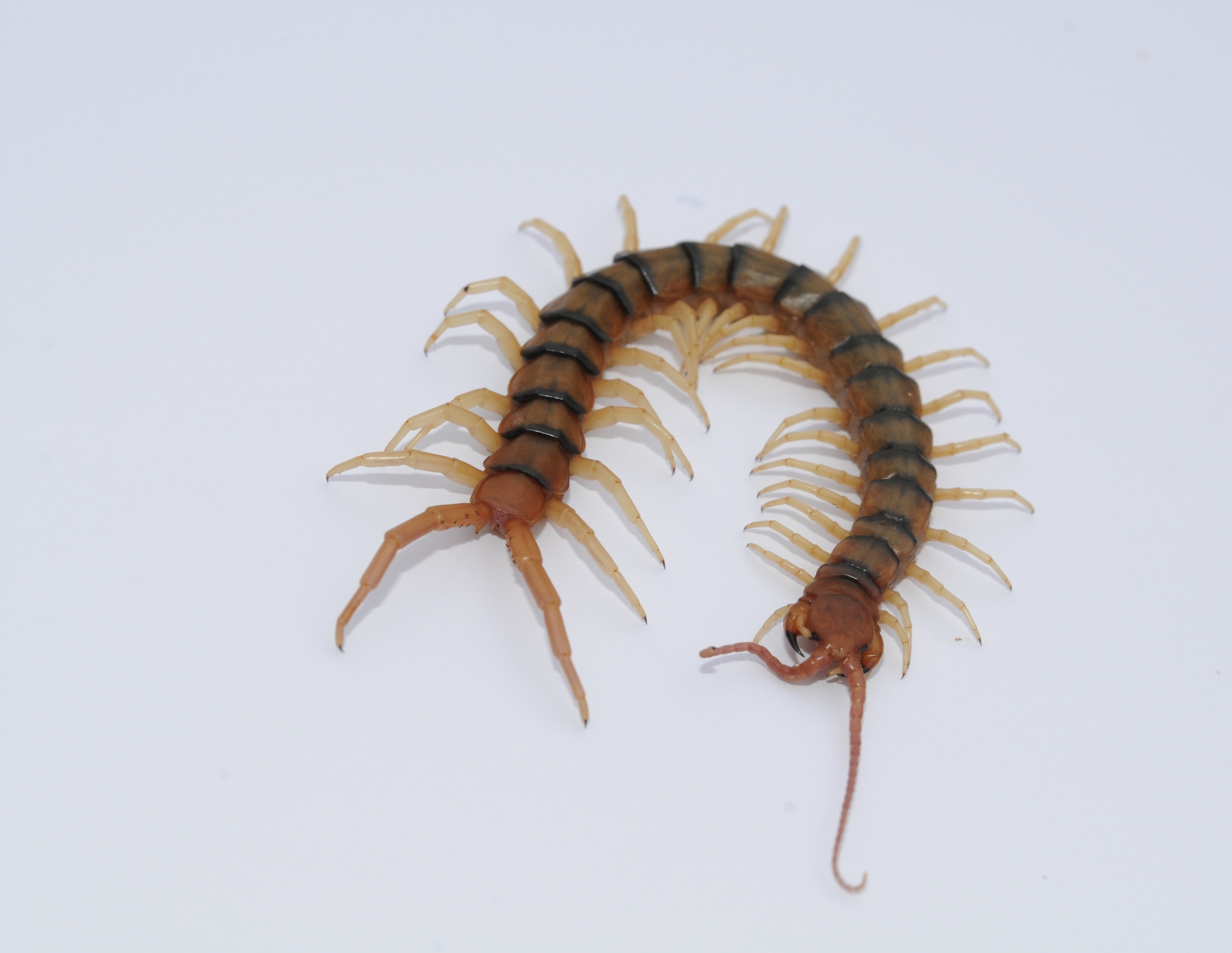
Scolopendra polymorpha as found in the Tonto Forest near Payson, Arizona

Scolopendra polymorpha is indigenous to the deserts of western North America; in Texas, New Mexico, and Arizona in the United States, and in Sonora and Chihuahua in northern Mexico. They primarily seek shelter during the day in moist, cool areas such as under desert rocks.

Due to their desert habitat, they are one of the most xeric members of Chilopoda. However, due to incomplete adaptation to this extreme environment, Scolopendra polymorpha are most active at night during the cool winter months, or occasionally during the summer New Mexico Monsoon, when temperatures are lower and moisture is higher, and remain burrowed underground throughout the rest of the year.

== Venom ==
The venom of Scolopendra polymorpha has been found to be medically relevant, as studies have shown an antimicrobial activity of the SPC13 peptide isolated from its venom. After purification by electroelution, this peptide exhibited antimicrobial activity against Staphylococcus aureus and Pseudomonas aeruginosa, two bacteria that are the leading causes of nosocomial infections. Additionally, SPC13 presented with bacteriostatic activity against Escherichia coli, which can cause food poisoning, pneumonia, and urinary tract infections.

Scolopendra polymorpha looking for prey

=== Effects ===
Observed in the muscle of mice, the venom of S. polymorpha is able to cause muscle damage, including necrosis (cell/tissue death), loss of fascicular structure, and ragged red fibers, a type of diseased mitochondrial accumulation. In addition to myotoxic effects, NADH and COX tests provide an indication that respiratory complexes within the target prey may also be affected.

Scolopendra polymorpha looking for prey

=== Regeneration ===
Scolopendra polymorpha is not able to completely regenerate its venom within the first 48 hours, limiting its defense activity. After a complete milking procedure, 65-86% of venom volume and 29-47% of protein mass was regenerated during this time. However, there was shown to be no additional regeneration past the initial two days, and both volume and protein levels did not match initial levels after 7 months of observation. The body length of this centipede is also negatively correlated with the rate of venom regeneration, making size a limiting factor in its regenerative abilities.
