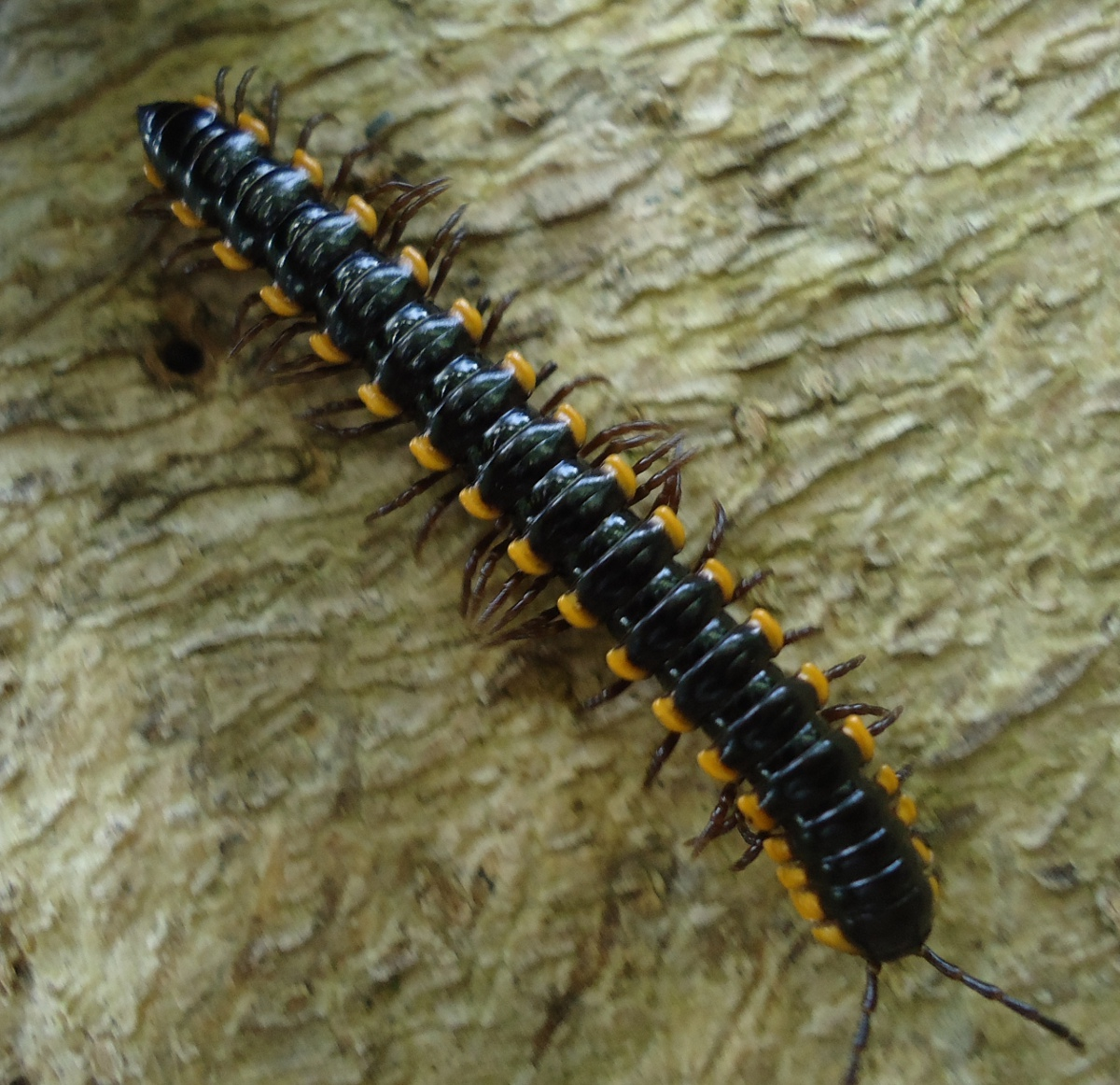
- Anoplodesmus saussurii in the Philippines.

Scientific classification
- Kingdom: Animalia
- Phylum: Arthropoda
- Subphylum: Myriapoda
- Class: Diplopoda
- Order: Polydesmida
- Family: Paradoxosomatidae
- Genus: Anoplodesmus
- Species: A. saussurii

Binomial name
- Anoplodesmus saussurii (Humbert, 1865)

Synonyms
- Polydesmus saussurii Humbert, 1865; Prionopeltis dasys Chamberlin, 1920; Anoplodesmus attemsii Verhoeff, 1930

= Anoplodesmus saussurii =

Species of millipede

Anoplodesmus saussurii is a species of millipede in the family Paradoxosomatidae. It was once thought endemic to South Asia but its presence was later confirmed in Southeast Asia, Fiji, and Mauritius.

== Description ==
It is about 21–33 mm in length. Adults are shiny dark brown to black in color. They are much largely aggregated species that can be found undercover of decaying litter layers in the agricultural and horticultural land areas and forests on humid soils. Mainly herbivores, they are known to eat any decaying and rotting leaves and vegetable parts, and even wood, decaying fish, and cow dung. After 20 to 25 days of copulation, female lays 200 to 400 eggs in earthen nests. One female may lay 2 to 4 times of egg masses in her lifetime. After seven moultings, stadia come out to surface after the onset of the rainy season.
