= Reginald Heber Fitz =

American physician (1843–1913)

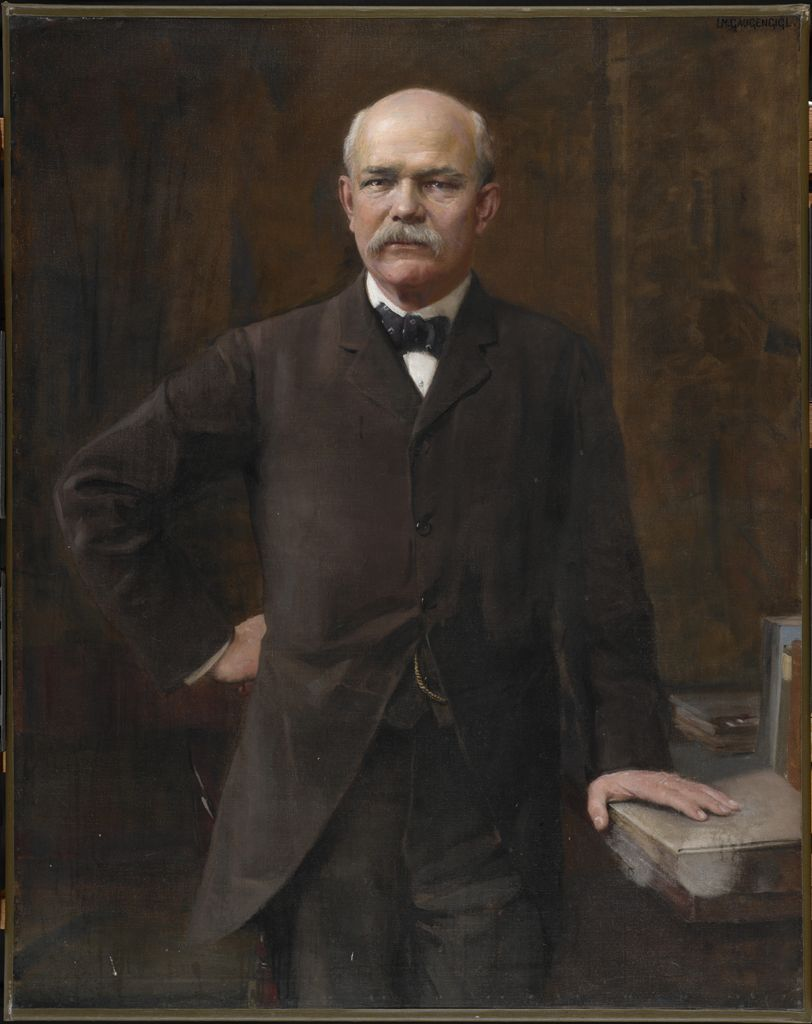
- Reginald Heber Fitz, portrait by Ignaz Gaugengigl
- Born: May 5, 1843; Chelsea, Massachusetts, U.S.
- Died: September 30, 1913 (aged 70); Brookline, Massachusetts, U.S.
- Education: Harvard University
- Occupation: Physician
- Spouse: Elizabeth Loring Clarke (m. 1879)
- Children: 3

Reginald Heber Fitz (May 5, 1843 – September 30, 1913) was an American physician known for his research on abdominal disorders.

== Early life ==
Reginald Heber Fitz was born on May 5, 1843, in Chelsea, Massachusetts. He graduated in 1864 (M.D., 1868) from Harvard University. He also studied in Vienna, Berlin, and Paris.

== Career ==
He taught at his alma mater, Harvard University. He was instructor in pathological anatomy in 1870–1873, assistant professor in 1873–1878, and professor from 1878 to 1908. In the latter year, he became professor emeritus.

In 1886, he published "Perforating Inflammation of the Vermiform Appendix; With Special Reference to Its Early Diagnosis and Treatment". This groundbreaking paper provided analysis of 466 cases of abdominal disorders that had previously been variously diagnosed and showed that they all involved a diseased appendix. He also introduced the term appendicitis. Dozens of names had previously been used for what had been thought to be a variety of diseases.

He also served as physician to the Boston Dispensary in 1871–1882 and to the Massachusetts General Hospital from 1887 to 1908. In 1894, he was president of the Association of American Physicians.

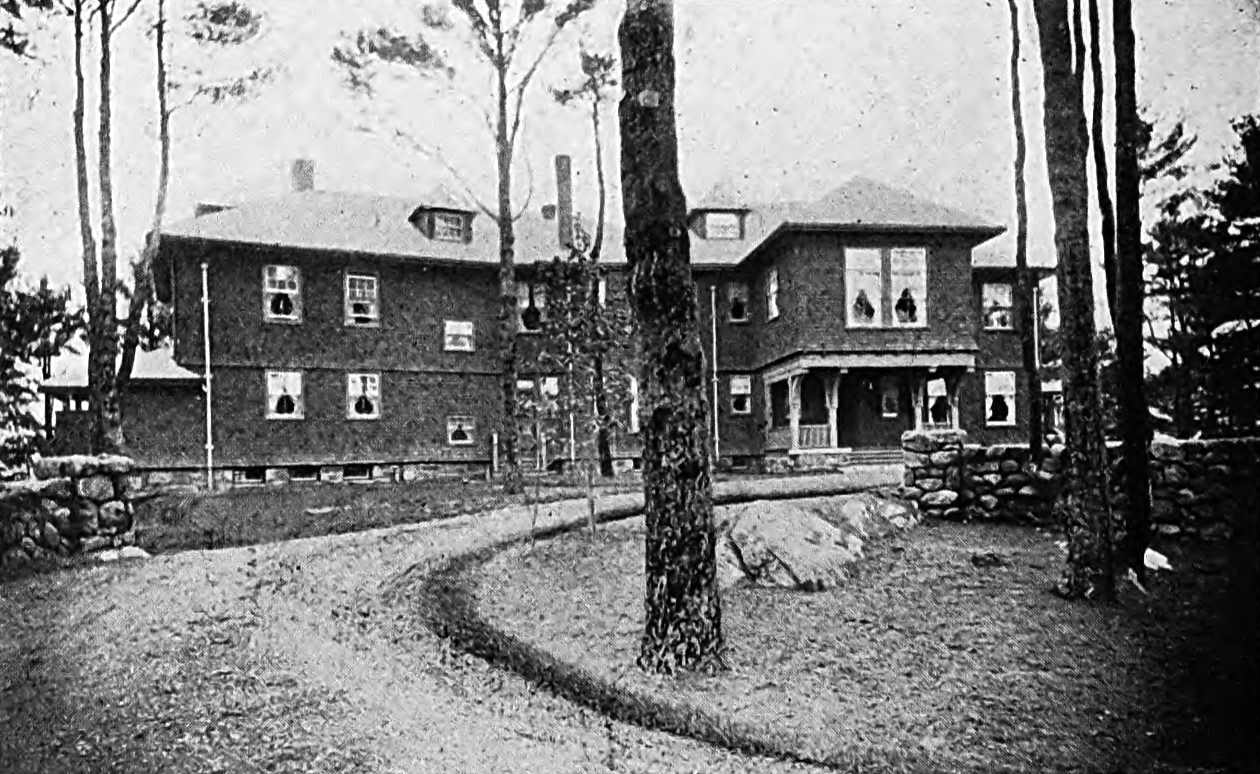
Fitz's summer cottage in Manchester, designed by Peabody & Stearns

== Personal life ==
Fitz married Elizabeth Loring Clarke in 1879, and they had three children.

He died in Brookline, Massachusetts, on September 30, 1913, after having surgery to remove a gastric ulcer.

== Bibliography ==
- The Practice of Medicine (with Horatio C. Wood, 1897).
