= Rhopaloiulidae =

Scientific classification
- Kingdom: Animalia
- Phylum: Arthropoda
- Subphylum: Myriapoda
- Class: Diplopoda
- Order: Julida
- Family: Rhopaloiulidae

Family of millipedes

Rhopaloiulidae is a family of millipedes belonging to the order Julida.

Genera:

- Cyphopoditius
- Rhopaloiulus Attems, 1926
