= Galliobatidae =

Scientific classification
- Kingdom: Animalia
- Phylum: Arthropoda
- Subphylum: Myriapoda
- Class: Diplopoda
- Order: Julida
- Family: Galliobatidae

Family of millipedes

Galliobatidae is a family of millipedes belonging to the order Julida.

Genera:

- Galliobates Verhoeff, 1911
