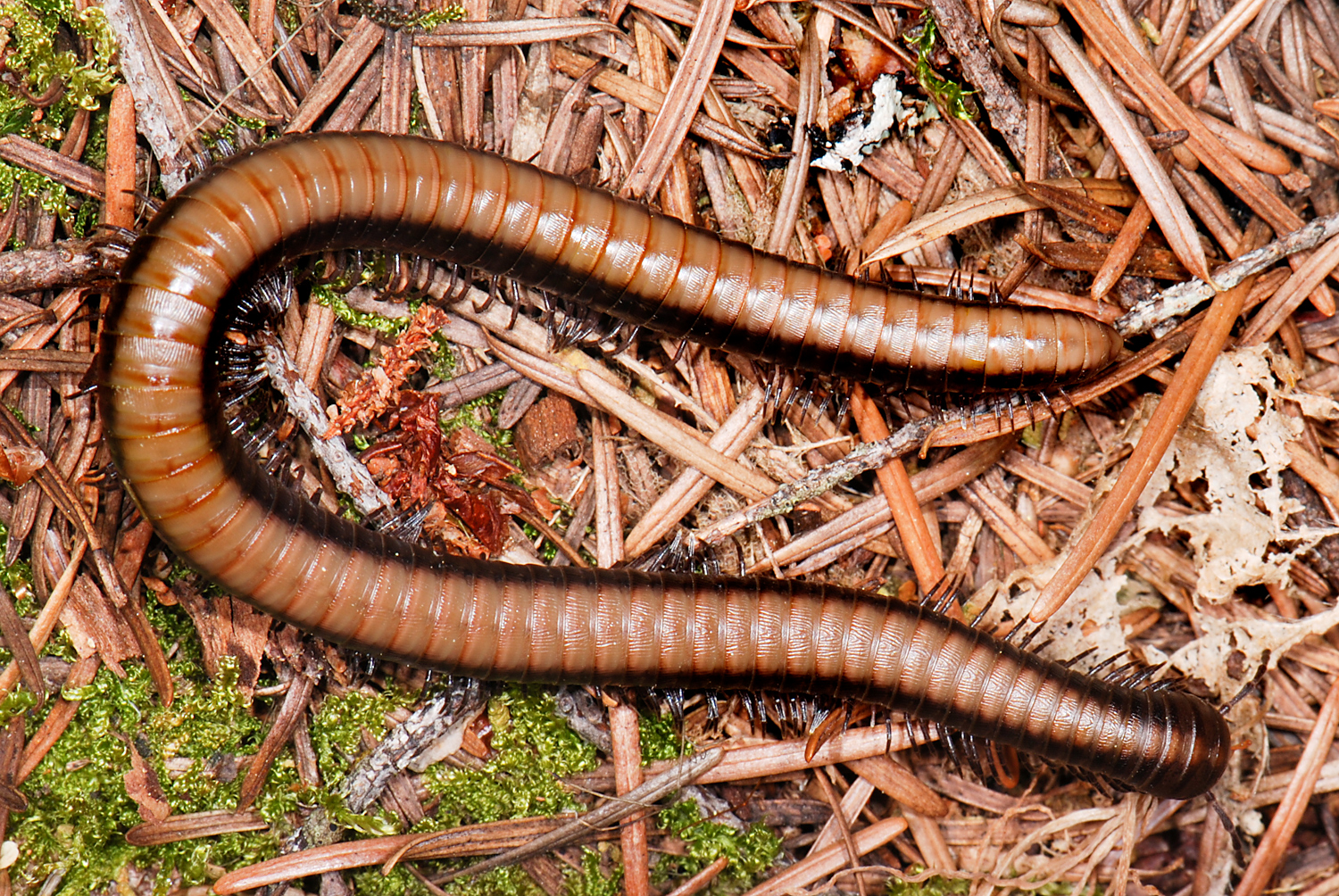
- Californiulus chamberlini

Scientific classification
- Kingdom: Animalia
- Phylum: Arthropoda
- Subphylum: Myriapoda
- Class: Diplopoda
- Order: Julida
- Family: Paeromopodidae; Cook, 1895

Genera
- Californiulus; Paeromopus

Synonyms
- Paeromopidae; Californiulidae

= Paeromopodidae =

Family of millipedes

Paeromopodidae is a family of large cylindrical millipedes of the order Julida native to the western United States of America. The family contains two genera and ten species and includes the longest millipedes in North America, with individuals reaching up to 16.5 cm (6.5 in) long.

== Description ==
Paeromopodids possess 60 to 80 body segments and range from 5 to 16.5 cm (2.0 to 6.5 in) long and 2 to 8 mm wide as adults. Paeromopodids have distinct parallel grooves called striae on their body rings that give a somewhat roughened texture and distinguishes them from other cylindrical western millipedes. Individuals may be rather uniformly blue gray, or colored in alternating bands of light and dark brown, or may possess a dorsal lengthwise stripe of yellow or light brown.

== Distribution ==
Paeromopodids are endemic to the United States and occur in two distinct areas: the first is a large Pacific coast range extending from Washington state to the southern Sierra Nevada and Death Valley region of California and east to the Warner Mountains straddling the borders of California, Oregon, and Nevada; and the second is a region spanning extreme northeastern Oregon, across the Idaho Panhandle to western Montana. Species of Paeromopus are generally larger than Californiulus, and occur only in California. Species of Californiulus occur in California as well as the rest of the range of the family.

== Ecology and behavior ==
Paeromopodids are relatively active and fast-moving millipedes, with a high degree of flexibility. Many species are found under rocks or moist, rotten logs as opposed to buried in leaf litter, and species of Californiulus may prefer drier microhabitats than Paeromopus. C. blechrostriatus inhabits the arid eastern slopes of the Sierra into Death Valley, and has been found at elevations of up to 2,400 m (8,000 ft).

== Species ==
Genus Californiulus

- Californiulus blechrostriatus
- Californiulus chamberlini
- Californiulus dorsovittatus
- Californiulus euphanus
- Californiulus parvior
- Californiulus yosemitensis

Genus Paeromopus

- Paeromopus angusticeps
- Paeromopus cavicolens
- Paeromopus eldoradus
- Paeromopus paniculus
