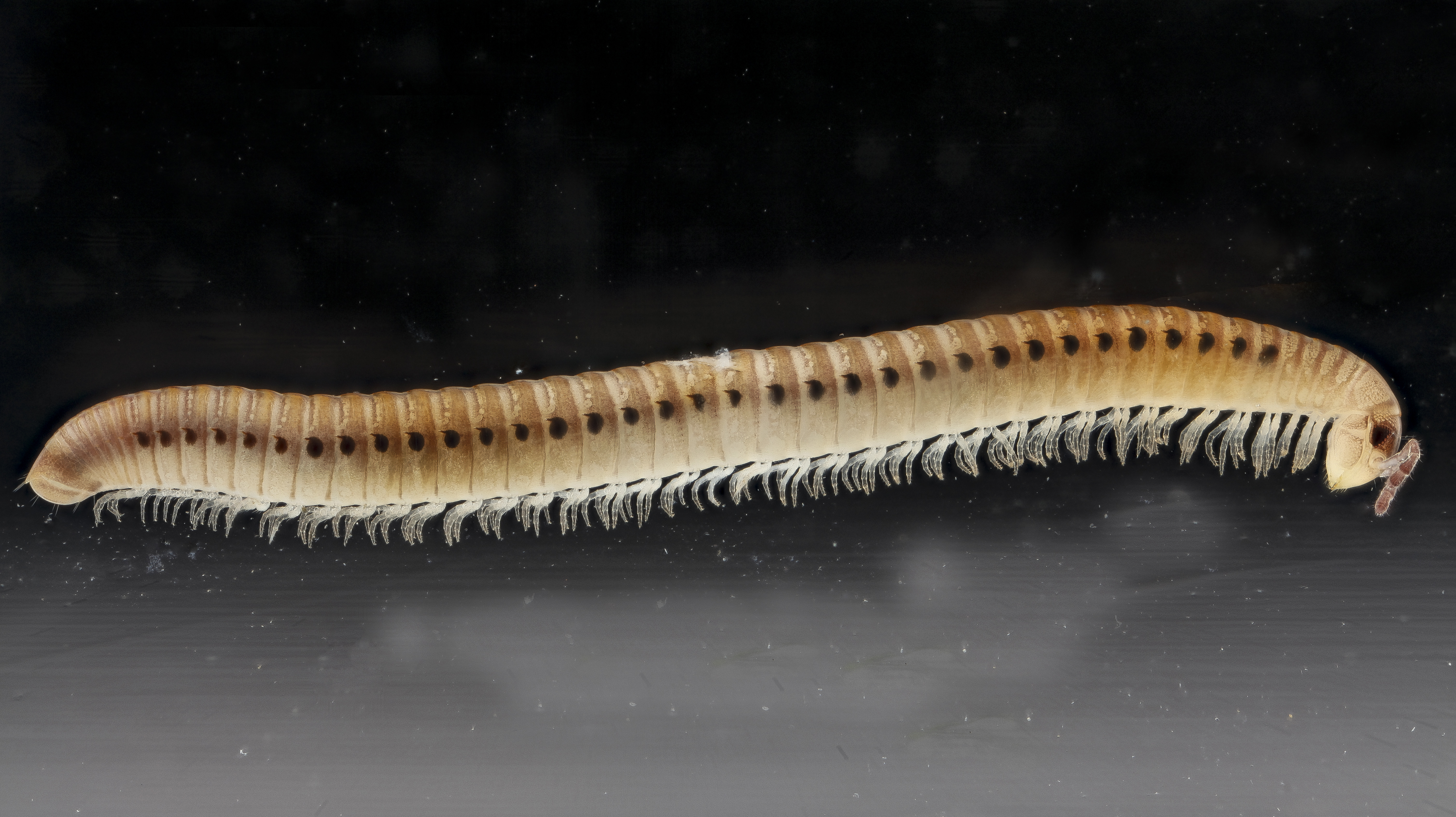
- A species of Nemasomatidae

Scientific classification
- Kingdom: Animalia
- Phylum: Arthropoda
- Subphylum: Myriapoda
- Class: Diplopoda
- Order: Julida
- Superfamily: Nemasomatoidea
- Family: Nemasomatidae; Bollman, 1893

Genera
- See text

= Nemasomatidae =

Family of millipedes

Nemasomatidae is a family of millipedes in the order Julida.

- Ameractis
- Antrokoreana
- Basoncopus
- Dasynemasoma
- Heterisobates
- Lavabates
- Nemasoma
- Orinisobates
- Sinostemmiulus
- Thalassisobates
