= Horatio C. Wood Jr. =

American physician and biologist

Horatio Curtis Wood Jr.
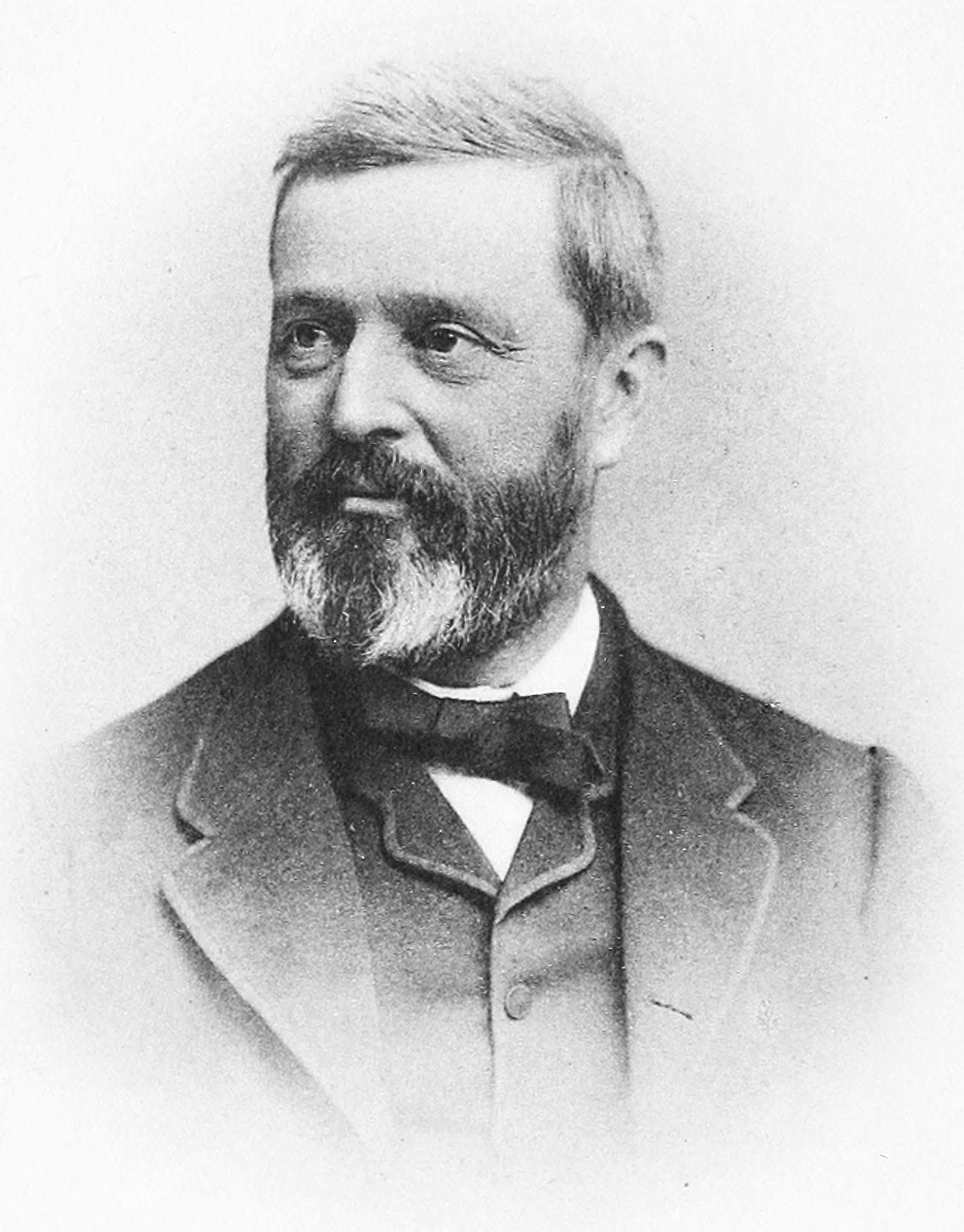
- Wood in 1889
- Born: January 13, 1841; Philadelphia
- Died: January 3, 1920 (aged 78); Philadelphia
- Occupation: Physician

Horatio Curtis Wood Jr. (January 13, 1841 – January 3, 1920) was an American physician and biologist. Born into a wealthy Pennsylvania family, he attended the Medical Department of the University of Pennsylvania, and after serving as a surgeon in the American Civil War, continued to teach at the university. A member of the National Academy of Sciences, he was known for his 1874 text Treatise on Therapeutics, which became a widely used medical textbook, and also for his botanical and zoological work: writing on freshwater algae, fossil plants, arachnids, and myriapods.

== Family ==
Horatio C. Wood was part of the Wood family of Pennsylvania. Many of his relatives share similar names, and there is some confusion over Wood's own middle name. Although reported in different sources as "Horatio Charles Wood" and "Horatio Curtis Wood", his son, Horatio Charles Wood Jr., has stated that his father's middle name was simply the letter C, without a period. This was a compromise between Wood's parents, his mother preferring the middle name Charles and his father, Horatio Curtis Wood, preferring Curtis. The family were Philadelphia Quakers descended from Richard Wood who sailed from Bristol with William Penn. Later in life, Wood also signed himself "Horatio C Wood, Sr.", to distinguish him from his son.

== Career ==
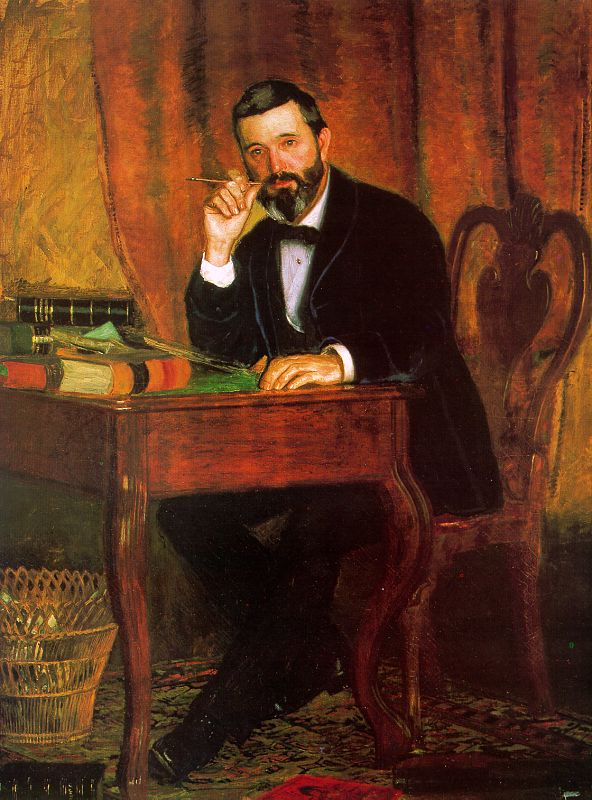
Portrait of Dr. Horatio C. Wood Jr. (1886) by Thomas Eakins, Detroit Institute of Arts.

Wood started studying medicine at the Medical Department of the University of Pennsylvania in 1859, and graduated in 1862, having presented a thesis on "enteric fever". While still a student, Wood wrote his first scientific paper, reporting on the Carboniferous flora of the United States. He served several internships in hospitals, and acted as a surgeon for the Northern army during the American Civil War, including a spell at the front-line Fairfax Seminary General Hospital.

In 1866, he was elected as a member of the American Philosophical Society.

After the Civil War, Wood supplemented his income by teaching privately at the medical school. He was awarded the chair of botany at the university, and was elected "Clinical Lecturer in Nervous Diseases" at the medical school in 1873, later rising to Clinical Professor. He was made Professor of Materia Medica and Pharmacy in 1876, and added General Therapeutics to his title later that year. Upon his retirement in 1907, Wood was granted the title of Emeritus Professor of Therapeutics.

Wood was a member of various scientific societies, including the American Physiological Society and the National Academy of Sciences, having joined the latter in 1879, the same year as Cleveland Abbe, William G. Farlow and Willard Gibbs. He was awarded honorary degrees by Lafayette College, Yale University and the University of Pennsylvania. A species of snake, Cubophis vudii, is named in his honor.

== Works ==
Wood's fame was established by his 1874 work Treatise on Therapeutics, which became the principal textbook in materia medica and therapeutics for 30 years. Wood published fourteen botanical papers between 1860 and 1877, including a 270-page monograph on freshwater algae. In his earlier years, Wood also studied myriapods (centipedes and millipedes) and arachnids: his 1865 The Myriapoda of North America included the first complete list of North American millipedes. Species named by Wood include Scolopendra polymorpha, the giant desert centipede, and Harpaphe haydeniana, the yellow-spotted millipede. Wood's arachnological papers concerned whip scorpions and harvestmen.

Three of Wood's papers were awarded prizes. His 1869 paper Research upon American Hemp won him a special prize from the American Philosophical Society; the Warren Prize of the Massachusetts General Hospital was awarded for his Experimental Researches in the Physiological Action of Amyl Nitrite; in 1872, he won the Boylston Prize for his Thermic Fever or Sunstroke.

Wood was the editor of several scientific journals, including New Remedies (1870–1873), Philadelphia Medical Times (1873–1880), The Therapeutic Gazette (1884–1890) and the U. S. Dispensatory (1883–1907).

=== Books ===
- Thermic Fever, or Sunstroke. Philadelphia, J. B. Lippincott Co. 128 pp. 1872
- A Treatise on Therapeutics Philadelphia, J. B. Lippincott Co. 578 pp. 1874
- Brain-Work and Overwork. Philadelphia, P. Blakiston. 126 pp. 1880
- The Dispensatory of the United States of America. With Joseph P. Remington and Samuel P. Sadtler. Philadelphia, J. B. Lippincott Go. 15th ed. 1928 pp. 1883
- Nervous Diseases and Their Diagnosis. Philadelphia, J. B. Lippincott Co. 501 pp. 1887
- Syphilis of the Nervous System (Physicians' Leisure Library, Ser. iv.). Detroit, G. S. Davis. 135 pp. 1890
- The Practice of Medicine. With Reginald H. Fitz. Philadelphia, J. B.Lippincott Co. 1088 pp. 1896

== Death ==
Wood died of pneumonia on January 3, 1920, and was buried in Philadelphia at Woodlands Cemetery.
