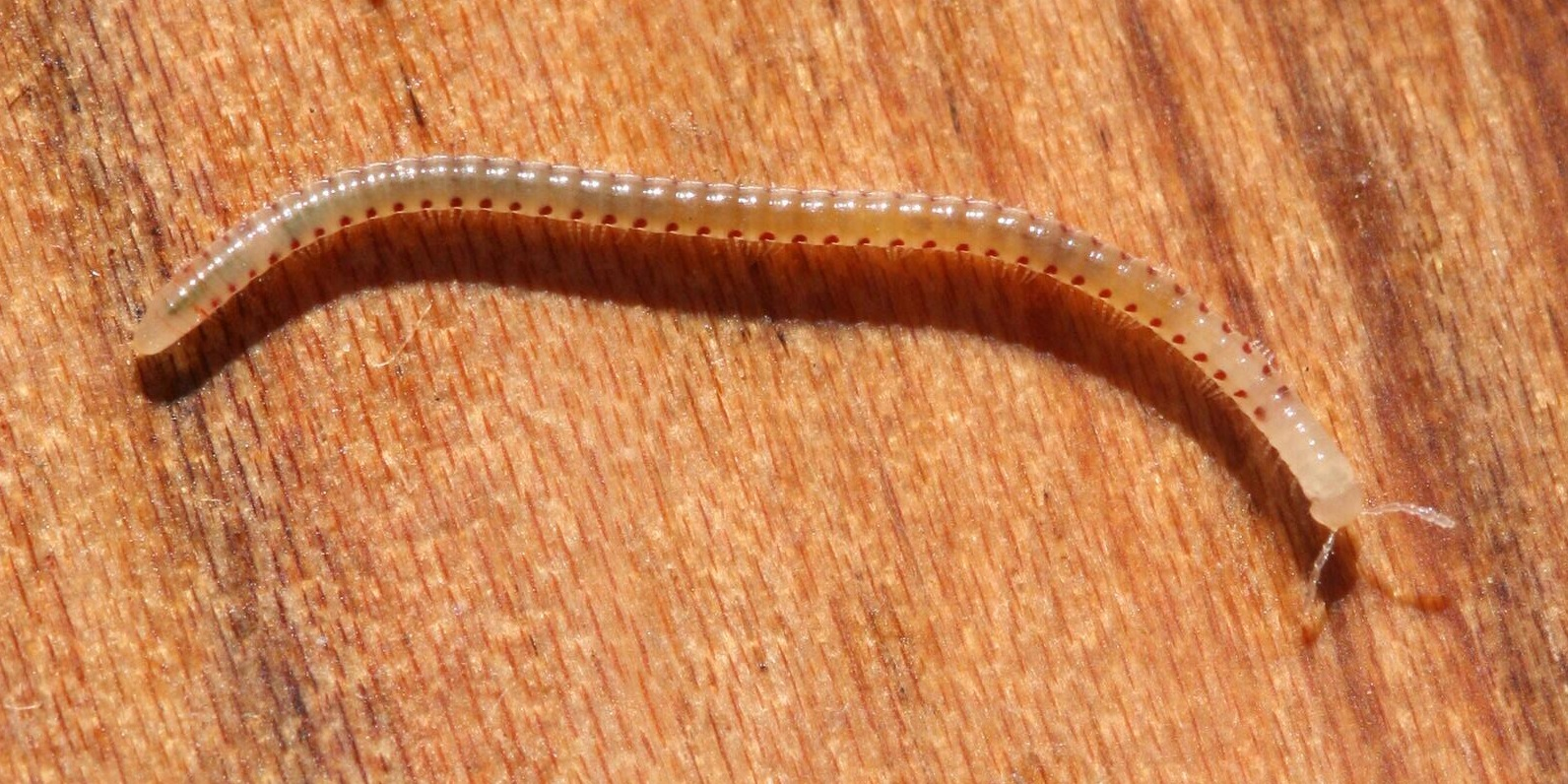
- Blaniulus guttulatus

Scientific classification
- Kingdom: Animalia
- Phylum: Arthropoda
- Subphylum: Myriapoda
- Class: Diplopoda
- Order: Julida
- Family: Blaniulidae; C. L. Koch, 1847

= Blaniulidae =

Family of millipedes

Blaniulidae is a family of millipedes in the order Julida. Members are long and thin, with a length:width ratio of up to 30:1. Eyes may be present or absent, and members have distinctive spots on each segment: the ozadenes or odiferous glands. The family contains the following genera:

- Acipes
- Alpiobates
- Archiboreoiulus
- Bilselibates
- Blaniulus
- Boreoiulus
- Choneiulus
- Gomphiocephalus
- Iberoiulus
- Microchoneiulus
- Nopoiulus
- Occitaniulus
- Orphanoiulus
- Proteroiulus
- Sardoblaniulus
- Tarracoblaniulus
- Thassoblaniulus
- Typhloblaniulus
- Vascoblaniulus
- Virgoiulus
