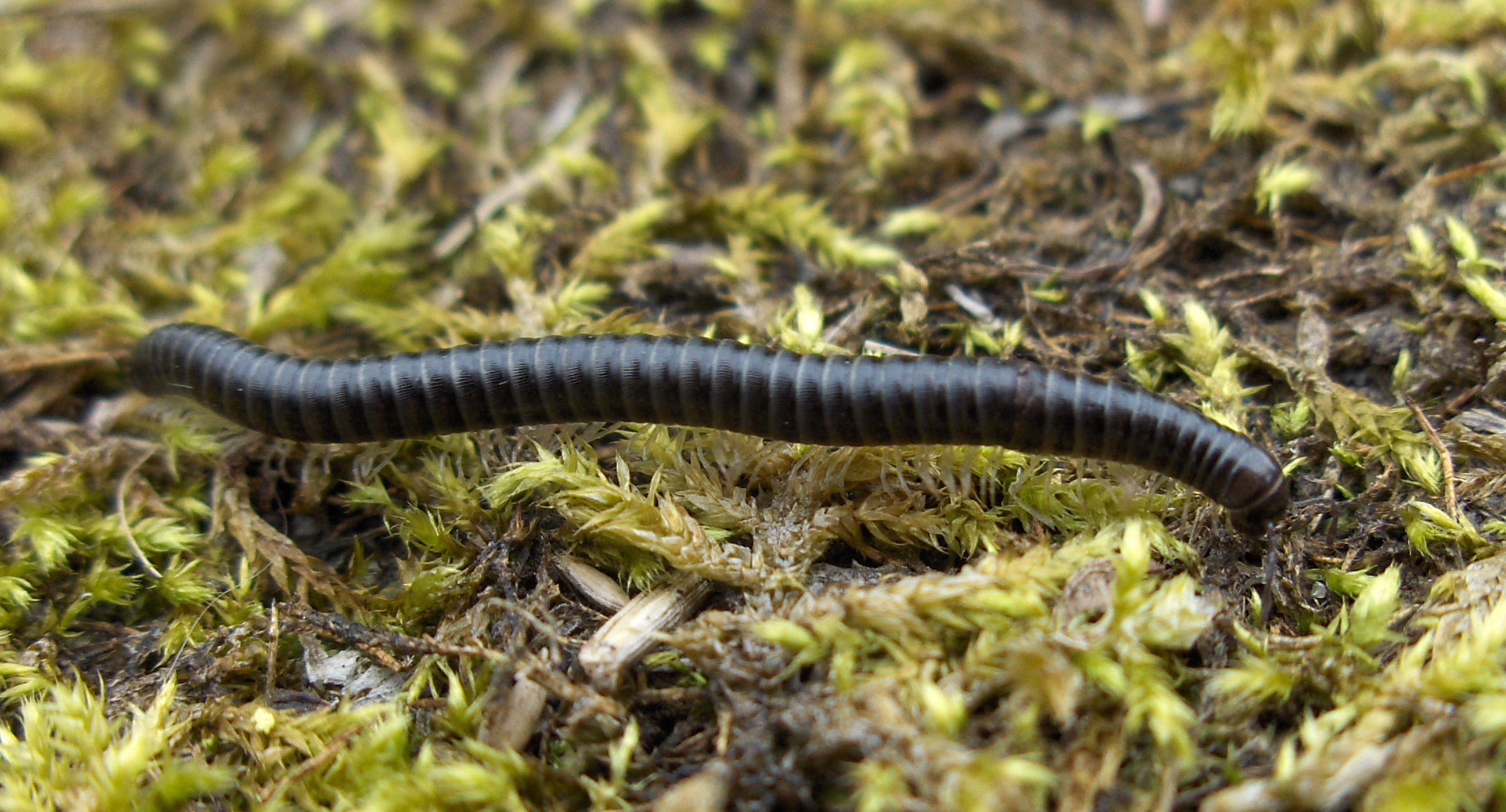
- Tachypodoiulus niger (Julidae)

Scientific classification
- Kingdom: Animalia
- Phylum: Arthropoda
- Subphylum: Myriapoda
- Class: Diplopoda
- Superorder: Juliformia
- Order: Julida; Brandt, 1833

Superfamilies
- Blaniuloidea; Juloidea; Nemasomatoidea; Paeromopodoidea; Parajuloidea

Synonyms
- Zygocheta Cook, 1895; Symphyognatha Verhoeff, 1910

= Julida =

Order of millipedes

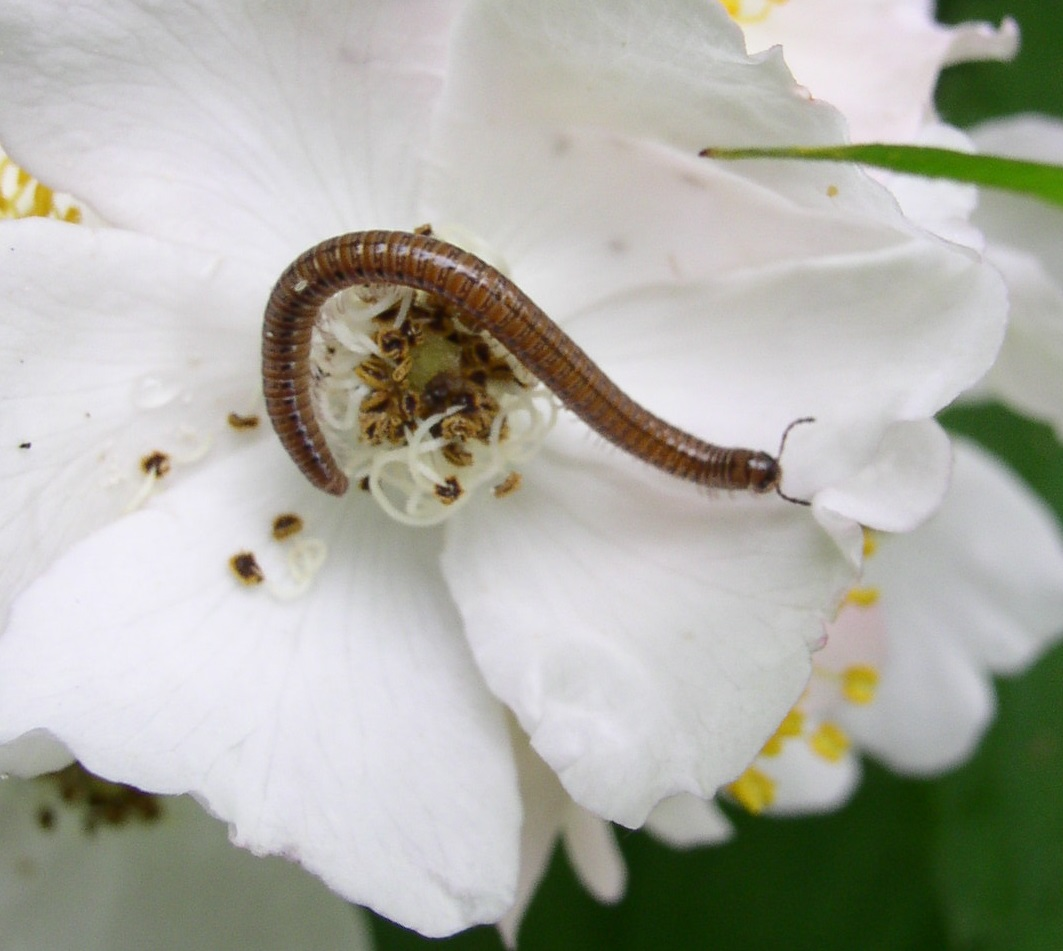
Unidentified Parajulidae.

Julida is an order of millipedes. Members are mostly small and cylindrical, typically ranging from 10–120 millimetres (0.39–4.72 in) in length. Eyes may be present or absent, and in mature males of many species, the first pair of legs is modified into hook-like structures. Additionally, both pairs of legs on the 7th body segment of males are modified into gonopods.

== Distribution ==
Julida contains predominantly temperate species ranging from North America to Panama, Europe, Asia north of the Himalayas, Asir region, Saudi Arabia, and Southeast Asia.

== Classification ==
The order Julida contains approximately 750 species, divided into the following superfamilies and families:

Blaniuloidea C. L. Koch, 1847

- Blaniulidae C. L. Koch, 1847
- Galliobatidae Brolemann, 1921
- Okeanobatidae Verhoeff, 1942
- Zosteractinidae Loomis, 1943

Juloidea Leach, 1814

- Julidae Leach, 1814
- Rhopaloiulidae Attems, 1926
- Trichoblaniulidae Verhoeff, 1911
- Trichonemasomatidae Enghoff, 1991

Nemasomatoidea Bollman, 1893

- Chelojulidae Enghoff, 1991
- Nemasomatidae Bollman, 1893
- Pseudonemasomatidae Enghoff, 1991
- Telsonemasomatidae Enghoff, 1991

Paeromopodoidea Cook, 1895

- Aprosphylosomatidae Hoffman, 1961
- Paeromopodidae Cook, 1895

Parajuloidea Bollman, 1893

- Mongoliulidae Pocock, 1903
- Parajulidae Bollman, 1893
