= Australobius tenuiunguis =

Scientific classification
- Kingdom: Animalia
- Phylum: Arthropoda
- Subphylum: Myriapoda
- Class: Chilopoda
- Order: Lithobiomorpha
- Family: Lithobiidae
- Genus: Australobius
- Species: A. tenuiunguis

Binomial name
- Australobius tenuiunguis (Eason, 1980)

Synonyms
- Lithobius tenuiunguis Leach, 1814

Species of centipede

Australobius tenuiunguis is a species of centipede in the Lithobiidae family. It was described in 1980 by British myriapodologist Edward Holt Eason.

== Distribution ==
The species occurs in New Guinea. The type locality is the Finim Tel Plateau, 35 km WSW of Telefomin, in the Western Province of Papua New Guinea.
