= Lithobius bullatus =

Scientific classification
- Kingdom: Animalia
- Phylum: Arthropoda
- Subphylum: Myriapoda
- Class: Chilopoda
- Order: Lithobiomorpha
- Family: Lithobiidae
- Genus: Lithobius
- Species: L. bullatus

Binomial name
- Lithobius bullatus Eason, 1993

Species of centipede

Lithobius bullatus is a species of centipede in the Lithobiidae family. It was described in 1993 by British myriapodologist Edward Holt Eason.

== Distribution ==
The species occurs in Hong Kong and the Hawaiian Islands. The type locality is Castle Peak, Hong Kong.
