= Australobius palnis =

Scientific classification
- Kingdom: Animalia
- Phylum: Arthropoda
- Subphylum: Myriapoda
- Class: Chilopoda
- Order: Lithobiomorpha
- Family: Lithobiidae
- Genus: Australobius
- Species: A. palnis

Binomial name
- Australobius palnis Eason, (1973)

Species of centipede

Australobius palnis is a species of centipedes in the family Lithobiidae. It is known only from Sri Lanka.
