= Common centipede =

Common centipede is the common name of two centipede species:

- Lithobius forficatus, a Eurasian stone centipede
- Scolopendra morsitans, an originally African centipede, now found also in many other localities

The Centipede grass is also sometimes called common centipede.
