= Bothropolys papuanus =

Scientific classification
- Kingdom: Animalia
- Phylum: Arthropoda
- Subphylum: Myriapoda
- Class: Chilopoda
- Order: Lithobiomorpha
- Family: Lithobiidae
- Genus: Bothropolys
- Species: B. papuanus

Binomial name
- Bothropolys papuanus Attems, 1914

Species of centipede

Bothropolys papuanus is a species of centipede in the Lithobiidae family. It was described in 1914 by Austrian myriapodologist Carl Attems.

== Distribution ==
The species occurs in New Britain, Papua New Guinea. The type locality is Ralum.
