= Lithobius hawaiiensis =

Scientific classification
- Kingdom: Animalia
- Phylum: Arthropoda
- Subphylum: Myriapoda
- Class: Chilopoda
- Order: Lithobiomorpha
- Family: Lithobiidae
- Genus: Lithobius
- Species: L. hawaiiensis

Binomial name
- Lithobius hawaiiensis Silvestri, 1904

Species of centipede

Lithobius hawaiiensis is a species of centipede in the Lithobiidae family. It was described in 1904 by Italian myriapodologist Filippo Silvestri.

== Distribution ==
The species occurs in the Hawaiian Islands. The type locality is Makaweli (Kaumakani), Kauai, at an elevation of 3,000 feet.
