= Australobius ethodes =

Scientific classification
- Kingdom: Animalia
- Phylum: Arthropoda
- Subphylum: Myriapoda
- Class: Chilopoda
- Order: Lithobiomorpha
- Family: Lithobiidae
- Genus: Australobius
- Species: A. ethodes

Binomial name
- Australobius ethodes Chamberlin, 1939

Species of centipede

Australobius ethodes is a species of centipede in the Lithobiidae family. It was described in 1939 by American myriapodologist Ralph Vary Chamberlin.

== Distribution ==
The species occurs in New Guinea. The type locality is Doormanpad in the Snow Mountains of Western New Guinea, at an elevation of 1,800–2,400 m.
