= Australobius sculpturatus =

Scientific classification
- Kingdom: Animalia
- Phylum: Arthropoda
- Subphylum: Myriapoda
- Class: Chilopoda
- Order: Lithobiomorpha
- Family: Lithobiidae
- Genus: Australobius
- Species: A. sculpturatus

Binomial name
- Australobius sculpturatus (Pocock, 1901)

Synonyms
- Monotarsobius ceylanicus Attems,1909

Species of centipede

Australobius sculpturatus is a species of centipedes in the family Lithobiidae. It is native to Maldives, Laccadive Islands, and Sri Lanka.
