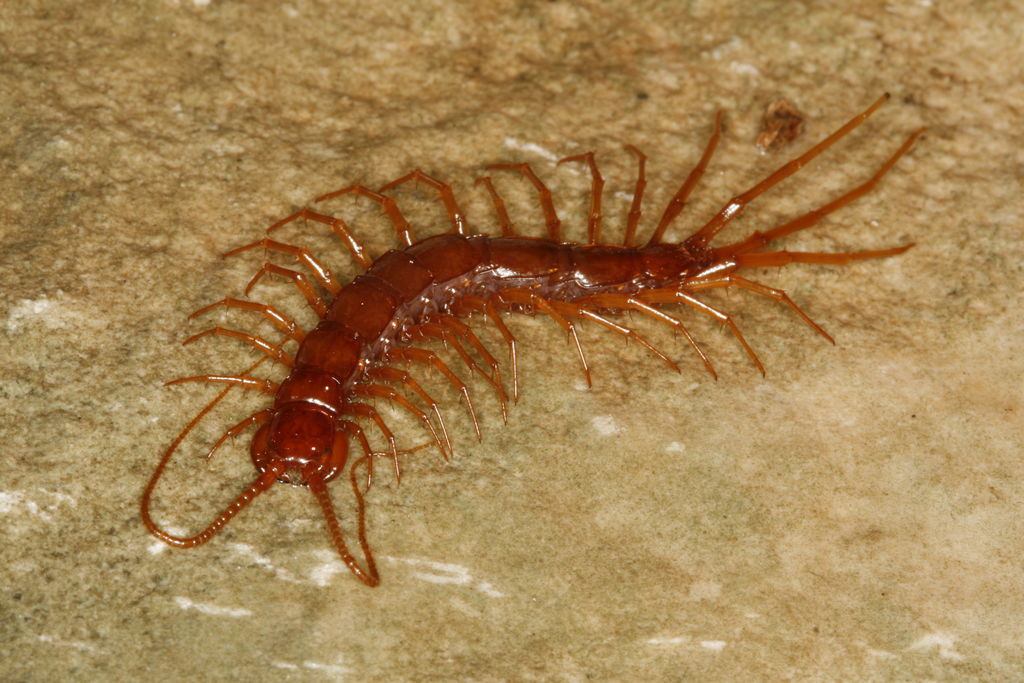
- Eupolybothrus cavernicolus male paratype
- Live Eupolybothrus cavernicolus male holotype

Scientific classification
- Kingdom: Animalia
- Phylum: Arthropoda
- Subphylum: Myriapoda
- Class: Chilopoda
- Order: Lithobiomorpha
- Family: Lithobiidae
- Genus: Eupolybothrus
- Species: E. cavernicolus

Binomial name
- Eupolybothrus cavernicolus (Komerički & Stoev, 2013)

= Eupolybothrus cavernicolus =

Species of centipede

Eupolybothrus cavernicolus is a species of centipede so far only found in two caves near the village of Kistanje, in Šibenik-Knin County, Croatia.

3D rendering of a micro-CT scan of Eupolybothrus cavernicolus.

It has been dubbed the cyber-centipede as it is the first eukaryotic species for which, in addition to the traditional morphological description, scientists have provided a transcriptomic profile, DNA barcoding data, detailed anatomical X-ray microtomography (micro-CT), and a movie of the living specimen.

It was discovered in by 2013 by biospeleologists Komerički and Stoev.
