= Lithobius obscurus =

Scientific classification
- Kingdom: Animalia
- Phylum: Arthropoda
- Subphylum: Myriapoda
- Class: Chilopoda
- Order: Lithobiomorpha
- Family: Lithobiidae
- Genus: Lithobius
- Species: L. obscurus

Binomial name
- Lithobius obscurus Meinert, 1872

Synonyms
- Lithobius araichensis Brölemann, 1924; Lithobius bermudensis Pocock, 1893; Andebius callao Chamberlin,1955; Chilebius coquimbo Chamberlin,1955; Lithobius demangei Lawrence, 1960; Walesobius excrescens Attems,1928; Lithobius granulatus Meinert, 1872; Lithobius platensis Gervais, 1847; Lithobius sydneyensis Pocock, 1891; Kesubius syntheticus Chamberlin,1925

Species of centipede

Lithobius obscurus is a species of centipede in the Lithobiidae family. It was first described in 1872 by Danish arachnologist Frederik Vilhelm August Meinert.

== Distribution ==
The species has a cosmopolitan distribution. The type locality is Carratraca, in Malaga, Spain.

=== Subspecies ===
- Lithobius obscurus azoreae Eason & Ashmole, 1992
- Lithobius obscurus mediocris Eason & Ashmole, 1992
- Lithobius obscurus obscurus Meinert, 1872

== Behaviour ==
The centipedes are solitary terrestrial predators that inhabit plant litter and soil.
