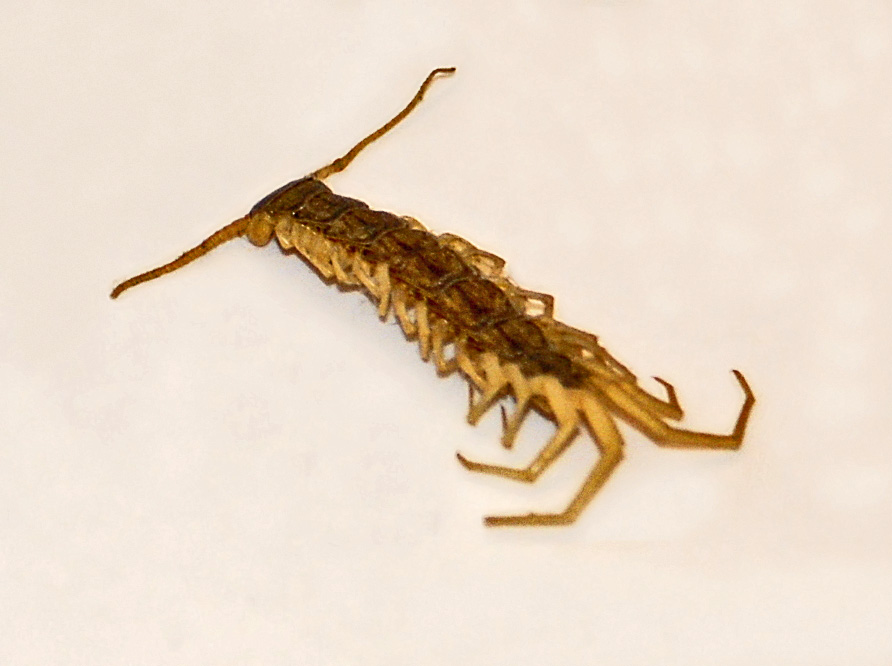
- Eupolybothrus fasciatus from Italy. Museum specimen

Scientific classification
- Kingdom: Animalia
- Phylum: Arthropoda
- Subphylum: Myriapoda
- Class: Chilopoda
- Order: Lithobiomorpha
- Family: Lithobiidae
- Genus: Eupolybothrus
- Species: E. fasciatus

Binomial name
- Eupolybothrus fasciatus (Newport, 1845)

Synonyms
- Lithobius fasciatus Newport, 1845

= Eupolybothrus fasciatus =

Species of centipede

Eupolybothrus fasciatus is a species of centipedes in the family Lithobiidae.

== Description ==
Eupolybothrus fasciatus can reach a length of 22–32 millimetres (0.87–1.26 in). Antennae have 36 to 42 articles.

== Distribution ==
Eupolybothrus fasciatus is found in Italy, France, and possibly the Balkans.
