= Lithobius meifengensis =

Scientific classification
- Kingdom: Animalia
- Phylum: Arthropoda
- Subphylum: Myriapoda
- Class: Chilopoda
- Order: Lithobiomorpha
- Family: Lithobiidae
- Genus: Lithobius
- Species: L. meifengensis

Binomial name
- Lithobius meifengensis Chao, Lee, Chang, 2018

Species of centipede

Lithobius (Monotarsobius) meifengensis, is a species of centipede of the family Lithobiidae. It was described from high altitude forest in central Taiwan.

Body length is about 7.0–9.8 mm. Antennae with 19 articles. Cephalic plate smooth and convex. Six ocelli present on each side. Tömösváry's organ comparatively small and nearly rounded. Tergites smooth, without wrinkles. Sternites trapeziform and narrower posteriorly. All legs with fairly long claws. 3333 coxal pores found in males, whereas about 3443 or 3444 found in females.
