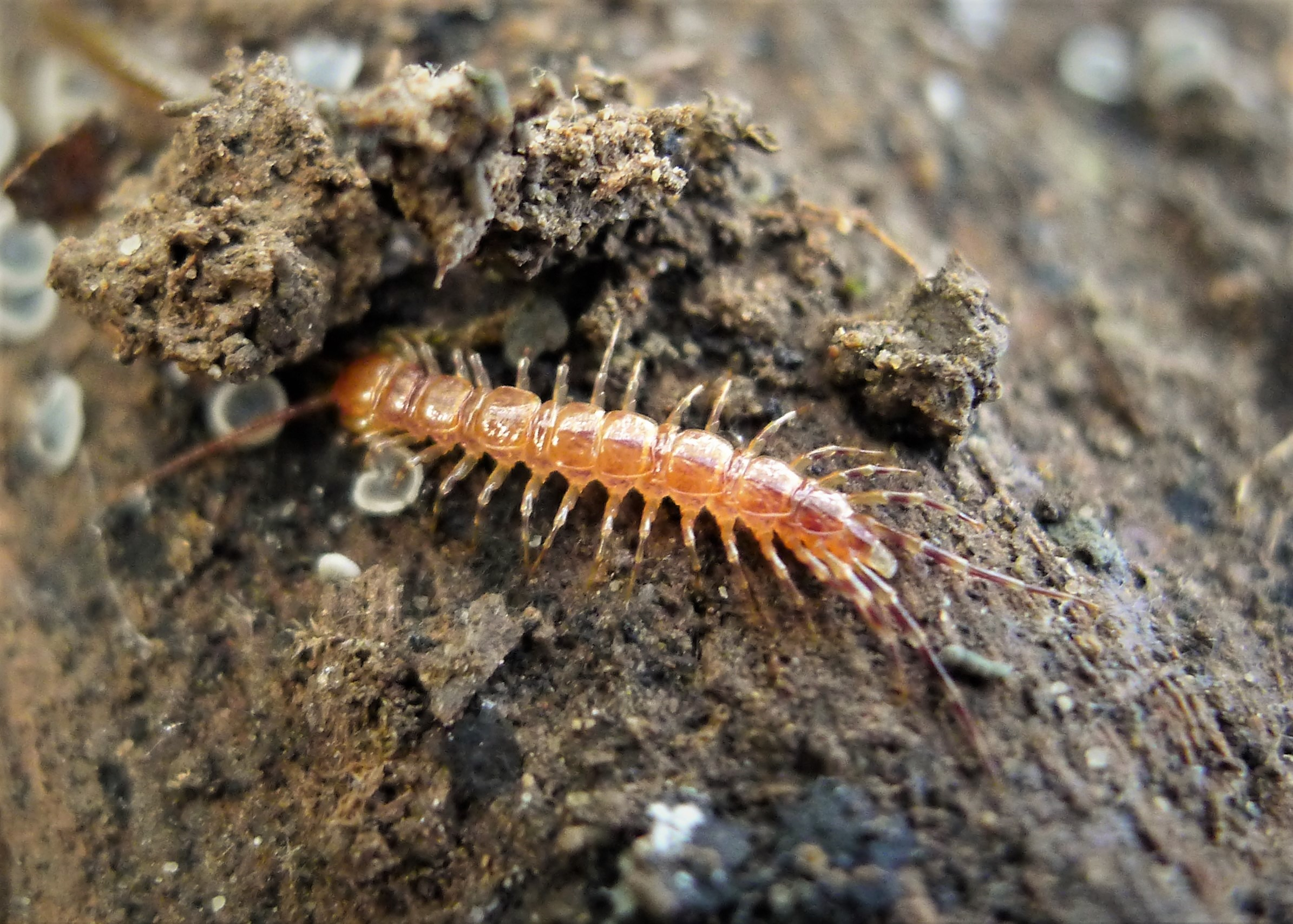

Scientific classification
- Domain: Eukaryota
- Kingdom: Animalia
- Phylum: Arthropoda
- Subphylum: Myriapoda
- Class: Chilopoda
- Order: Lithobiomorpha
- Family: Lithobiidae
- Genus: Lithobius
- Species: L. variegatus

Binomial name
- Lithobius variegatus Leach, 1814

= Lithobius variegatus =

Species of centipede

Lithobius variegatus is a species of centipede found in Europe, sometimes called the common banded centipede or banded centipede.

Lithobius variegatus can be distinguished from its close relative Lithobius forficatus by the presence of conspicuous purple or brown rings around its legs. It preys on small invertebrates such as woodlice (including Philoscia muscorum, Oniscus asellus, Porcellio scaber, and Androniscus dentiger) and millipedes, including Polydesmus angustus and Tachypodoiulus niger. It, in turn, is eaten by birds such as magpies and blackbirds.

For a long time, it was thought that L. variegatus was endemic to the British Isles, but populations were later discovered in the Channel Islands, Brittany, northwestern Spain, and northern Portugal. There are also records from southern Italy, Morocco, and Tunisia, making it a good example of a member of the Lusitanian fauna – species found in the western Mediterranean region and extending northwards to the British Isles, but avoiding most of North-West Europe.

Lithobius variegatus also contains the subspecies L. v. rubripes, which was formerly treated as a separate species. It is more widespread in Western Europe and lacks the banding pattern on the legs.
