= Australobius viduus =

Scientific classification
- Kingdom: Animalia
- Phylum: Arthropoda
- Subphylum: Myriapoda
- Class: Chilopoda
- Order: Lithobiomorpha
- Family: Lithobiidae
- Genus: Australobius
- Species: A. viduus

Binomial name
- Australobius viduus Attems, 1932

Species of centipede

Australobius viduus is a species of centipede in the Lithobiidae family. It was described in 1932 by Austrian myriapodologist Carl Attems.

== Distribution ==
The species occurs in New Guinea. The type locality is Angi Gita Lake, in the Arfak Mountains of the Bird's Head Peninsula.
