= Australobius loriae =

Scientific classification
- Kingdom: Animalia
- Phylum: Arthropoda
- Subphylum: Myriapoda
- Class: Chilopoda
- Order: Lithobiomorpha
- Family: Lithobiidae
- Genus: Australobius
- Species: A. loriae

Binomial name
- Australobius loriae (Silvestri, 1894)

Synonyms
- Lithobius loriae Leach, 1814

Species of centipede

Australobius loriae is a species of centipede in the Lithobiidae family. It was described in 1894 by Italian myriapodologist Filippo Silvestri.

== Distribution ==
The species occurs in New Guinea. The type locality is Moroka, at an elevation of 1,300 m, in Papua New Guinea.
