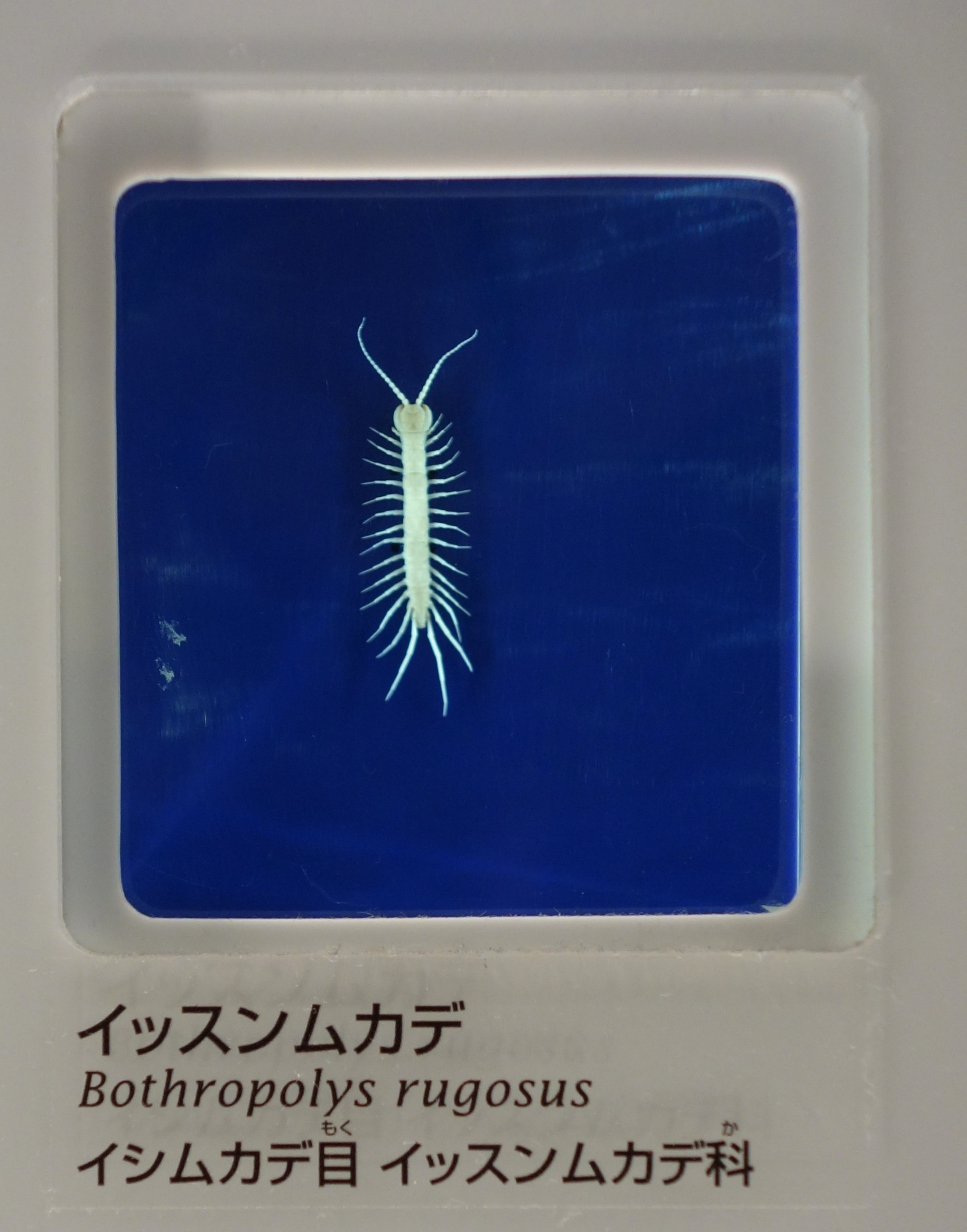
- Specimen in the National Museum of Nature and Science, Tokyo

Scientific classification
- Kingdom: Animalia
- Phylum: Arthropoda
- Subphylum: Myriapoda
- Class: Chilopoda
- Order: Lithobiomorpha
- Family: Lithobiidae
- Genus: Bothropolys
- Species: B. rugosus

Binomial name
- Bothropolys rugosus (Meinert, 1872)

Synonyms
- Lithobius asperatus L.Koch,1878; Bothropolys migrans Chamberlin, 1930; Lithobius shimensis Pocock,1895; Bothropolys spinosior Chamberlin, 1920; Lithobius thetidis Karsh, 1880

= Bothropolys rugosus =

Species of centipede

Bothropolys rugosus is a species of centipede in the Lithobiidae family. It was described in 1872 by Danish arachnologist Frederik Vilhelm August Meinert.

== Distribution ==
The species occurs in Asia. The type locality is Oahu, Hawaiian Islands, where it is introduced.
