= Lithobius tetraspinus =

Scientific classification
- Kingdom: Animalia
- Phylum: Arthropoda
- Subphylum: Myriapoda
- Class: Chilopoda
- Order: Lithobiomorpha
- Family: Lithobiidae
- Genus: Lithobius
- Species: L. tetraspinus

Binomial name
- Lithobius tetraspinus Pei, Lu, Liu, Hou, Ma, 2018

Species of centipede

Lithobius (Ezembius) tetraspinus, is a species of centipede of the family Lithobiidae. It was described from northwest China.

Body length is about 9.6–13.3 mm. Antennae with 19–22 articles. Cephalic plate smooth and convex. Eight to ten ocelli present on each side. Tömösváry's organ moderately smaller. Tergites smooth, without wrinkles. Sternites trapeziform and narrower posteriorly. All legs with fairly long claws. 2332, 2333 coxal pores found in males, whereas about 3343 found in females.
