= Australobius scabrior =

Scientific classification
- Kingdom: Animalia
- Phylum: Arthropoda
- Subphylum: Myriapoda
- Class: Chilopoda
- Order: Lithobiomorpha
- Family: Lithobiidae
- Genus: Australobius
- Species: A. scabrior

Binomial name
- Australobius scabrior Chamberlin, 1920

Species of centipede

Australobius scabrior is a species of centipede in the Lithobiidae family. It was first described in 1920 by American biologist Ralph Vary Chamberlin.

== Distribution ==
The species occurs in the eastern states of mainland Australia: Queensland, New South Wales and Victoria. The type locality is Kuranda, on the Atherton Tableland of north-eastern Queensland.

== Behaviour ==
The centipedes are solitary terrestrial predators that inhabit plant litter and soil.
