= Lithobius peregrinus =

Scientific classification
- Kingdom: Animalia
- Phylum: Arthropoda
- Subphylum: Myriapoda
- Class: Chilopoda
- Order: Lithobiomorpha
- Family: Lithobiidae
- Genus: Lithobius
- Species: L. peregrinus

Binomial name
- Lithobius peregrinus Latzel, 1880

Synonyms
- Lithobius dalmaticus Latzel, 1880; Lithobius ethochaetus Chamberlin, 1938; Lithobius provocator Pocock, 1891; Lithobius targionii Fanzago, 1874; Lithobius obesus petnickensis Matic & Darabantzu, 1968; Lithobius obesus serbica Matic, 1957

Species of centipede

Lithobius peregrinus is a species of centipede in the Lithobiidae family. It was first described in 1880 by Austrian myriapodologist Robert Latzel.

== Distribution ==
The species has a cosmopolitan distribution. The type locality is Dalmatia, in Croatia.

== Behaviour ==
The centipedes are solitary terrestrial predators that inhabit plant litter and soil.
