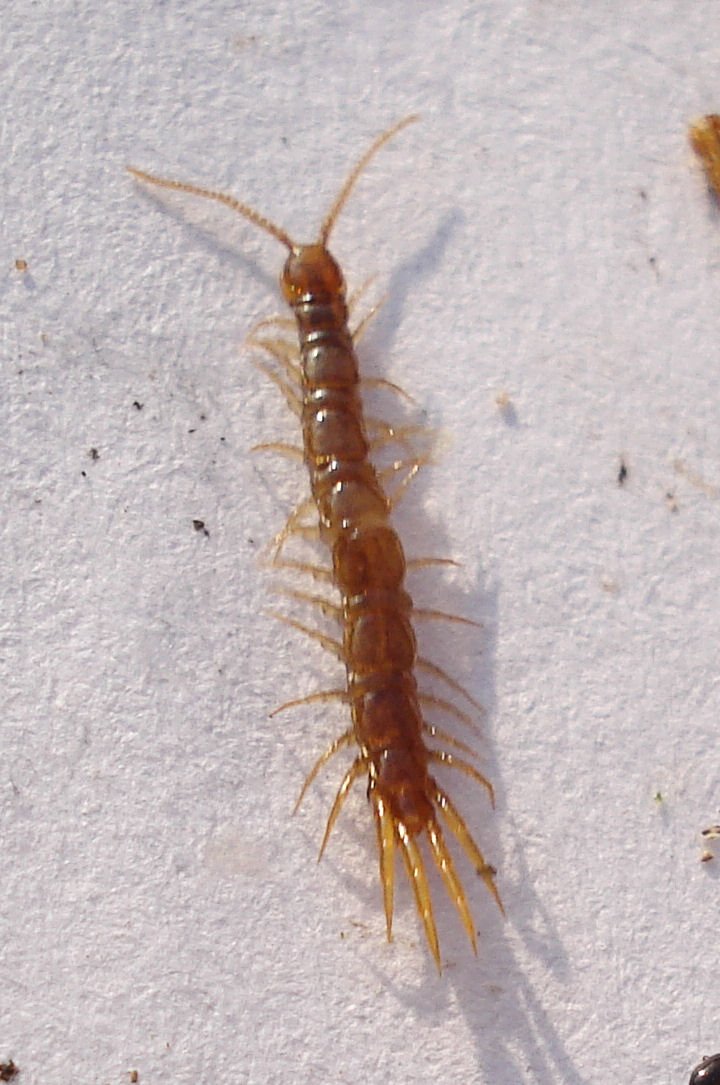

Scientific classification
- Domain: Eukaryota
- Kingdom: Animalia
- Phylum: Arthropoda
- Subphylum: Myriapoda
- Class: Chilopoda
- Order: Lithobiomorpha
- Family: Lithobiidae
- Genus: Lithobius
- Species: L. microps

Binomial name
- Lithobius microps Meinert, 1868

Synonyms
- Lithobius duboscqui; Sigibius puritanicus

= Lithobius microps =

Species of Chilopoda

Lithobius microps, also known as the stone centipede, is a species of centipede in the Lithobiidae family.

== Description ==
The species is fast-moving and usually quite small, up to about 1" long, possibly to 2" long. It is red or orange in colour. There are small poison claws on the sides of the head.

== Distribution ==
The species can be found mainly in the north-east of the United States (in New York, Connecticut, Rhode Island, and Massachusetts, where it is one of the most common centipedes in the region). It also occurs in England and South Wales where it is considered to be among the smallest of British centipedes. It has been introduced to Australia’s island state of Tasmania.

== Behaviour ==
The centipedes like to hide in wood, beneath stones and rocks, in soil, and under small buildings. They are most common in gardens, in dead or rotting wood, beneath stones and rocks, and under sheds. They may be seen in basements in winter, though this is uncommon. They also dig burrows in which to hibernate, from which they will emerge in warmer weather. They are hard to catch, and rarely bite if handled.
