= Bothropolys maluhianus =

Scientific classification
- Kingdom: Animalia
- Phylum: Arthropoda
- Subphylum: Myriapoda
- Class: Chilopoda
- Order: Lithobiomorpha
- Family: Lithobiidae
- Genus: Bothropolys
- Species: B. maluhianus

Binomial name
- Bothropolys maluhianus Attems, 1914

Synonyms
- Bothropolys oahuanus Chamberlin, 1920

Species of centipede

Bothropolys maluhianus is a species of centipede in the Lithobiidae family. It was described in 1914 by Austrian myriapodologist Carl Attems.

== Distribution ==
The species occurs in the Hawaiian Islands. The type locality is Maluhia, Oahu.
