= Lithobius moananus =

Scientific classification
- Kingdom: Animalia
- Phylum: Arthropoda
- Subphylum: Myriapoda
- Class: Chilopoda
- Order: Lithobiomorpha
- Family: Lithobiidae
- Genus: Lithobius
- Species: L. moananus

Binomial name
- Lithobius moananus (Chamberlin, 1926)

Species of centipede

Lithobius moananus is a species of centipede in the Lithobiidae family. It was described in 1926 by American myriapodologist Ralph Vary Chamberlin.

== Distribution ==
The species occurs in the Hawaiian Islands. The type locality is Ocean Island (Kure Atoll), near Midway Atoll.
