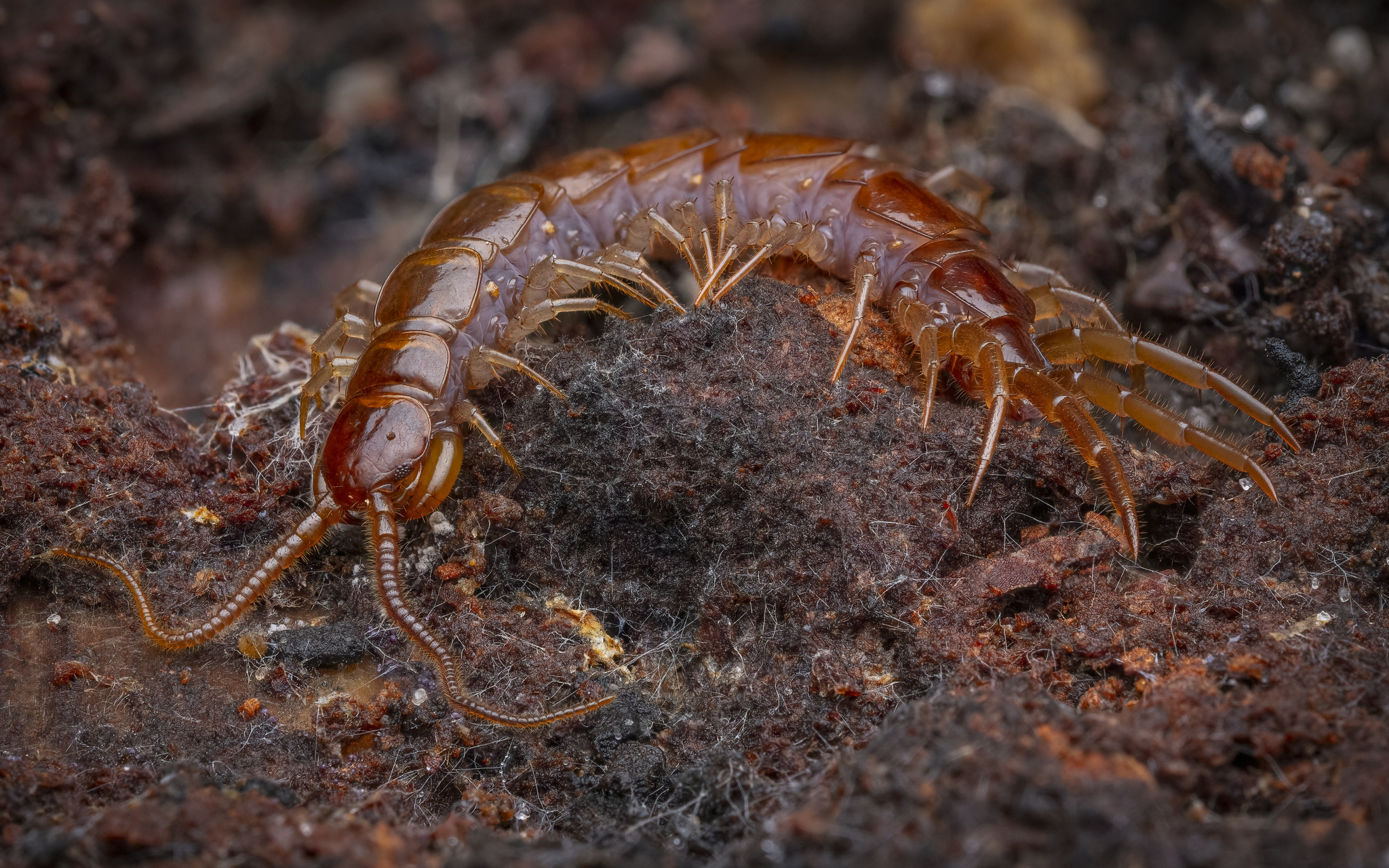

Scientific classification
- Kingdom: Animalia
- Phylum: Arthropoda
- Subphylum: Myriapoda
- Class: Chilopoda
- Order: Lithobiomorpha
- Family: Lithobiidae
- Genus: Lithobius
- Species: L. forficatus

Binomial name
- Lithobius forficatus (Linnaeus, 1758)

= Lithobius forficatus =

Species of centipede

Lithobius forficatus, most commonly known as the garden centipede, brown centipede or stone centipede, is a common centipede of the family Lithobiidae. It is found in Europe and North America.

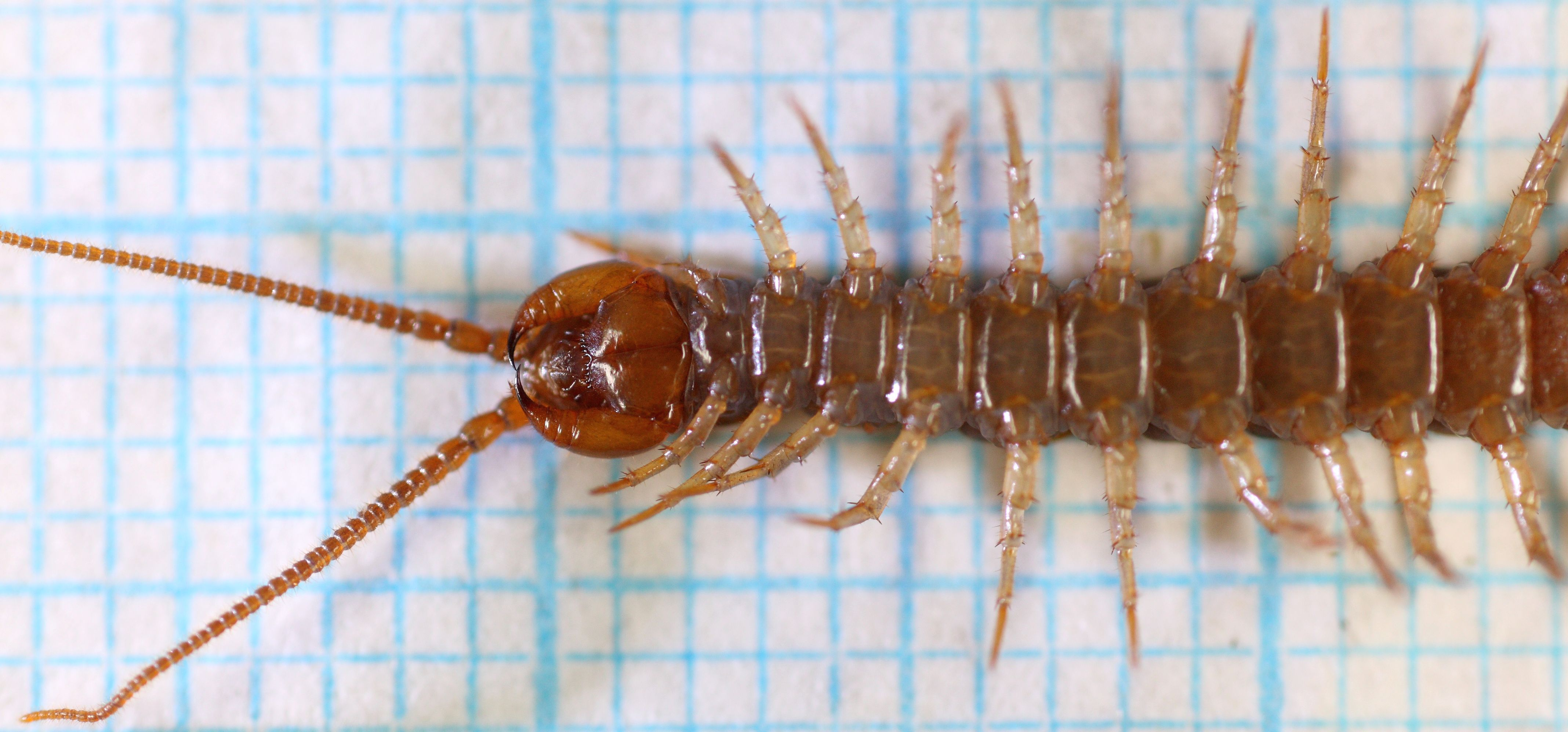
Underside with the powerful and venomous front legs

== Description ==
The species is between 18 and 30 mm (0.71 and 1.18 in) long and up to 4 mm broad and is a chestnut brown coloration. It is similar to a variety of other European lithobiid centipedes, particularly the striped centipede, Lithobius variegatus, but L. forficatus does not have stripes on its legs.

Lithobiids leave the egg with seven pairs of legs, and each time they molt, they develop additional body segments with a new pair of legs on each. An adult will have a maximum of 15 pairs of legs.

== Distribution and habitat ==
The species is found mainly in Europe and North America, as well as the Hawaiian Islands. Like most lithobiids, it is found in the upper layers of soil, particularly under rocks and rotting logs.

== Behaviour ==
Lithobius forficatus may live for as long as five to six years. It can be fairly easily identified by its reaction to being revealed, which is to run extremely quickly for cover. This is different from many of the other species of large lithobiid, which tend to be less extreme in their evasion behaviour.

=== Feeding ===
It is a predator, and its main diet consists of insects and invertebrates, including spiders, slugs, worms and flies. It has specially-adapted front legs which have evolved to resemble 'fangs' and they contain venom that allows the centipede to overpower its prey. Despite possessing venom, L. forficatus is considered harmless to humans; its small size means it rarely breaks the skin, and bites cause at most brief localised pain.
