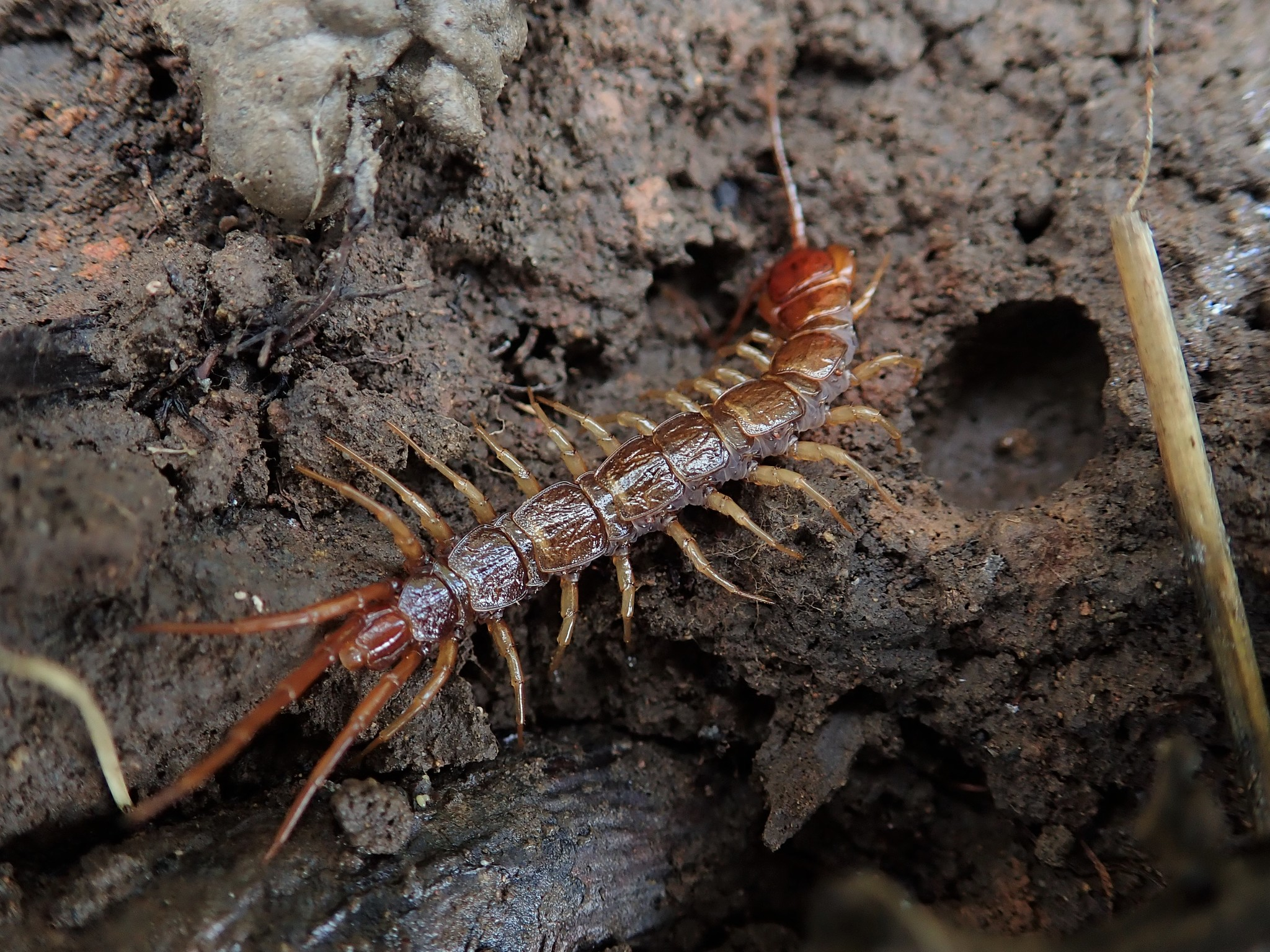
- Bothropolys xanti

Scientific classification
- Kingdom: Animalia
- Phylum: Arthropoda
- Subphylum: Myriapoda
- Class: Chilopoda
- Order: Lithobiomorpha
- Family: Lithobiidae
- Genus: Bothropolys; Wood, 186

Synonyms
- Polybothrus Latzel, 1880; Lithobius (Polybothrus) Latzel, 1880

= Bothropolys =

Genus of centipedes

Bothropolys is a genus of centipedes in the family Lithobiidae.

== Species ==
There are about 30 valid species:

- Bothropolys acutidens Takakuwa, 1941
- Bothropolys columbiensis Chamberlin, 1925
- Bothropolys crassidentatus Takakuwa, 1949
- Bothropolys curvatus Takakuwa, 1939
- Bothropolys dasys Chamberlin, 1941
- Bothropolys desertorum Lignau, 1929
- Bothropolys dziadoszi Matic, 1974
- Bothropolys epelus Chamberlin, 1931
- Bothropolys ethus Chamberlin, 1946
- Bothropolys ghilarovi Zalesskaja, 1975
- Bothropolys gigas Takakuwa, 1938
- Bothropolys hoples (Brölemann, 1896)
- Bothropolys imaharensis Verhoeff, 1937
- Bothropolys kawatiensis Takakuwa, 1939
- Bothropolys leei Paik, 1961
- Bothropolys lutulentus Verhoeff, 1930
- Bothropolys maluhianus Attems, 1914
- Bothropolys montanus Verhoeff, 1938
- Bothropolys mroczkowskii Matic, 1974
- Bothropolys multidentatus (Newport, 1845)
- Bothropolys obliquus Takakuwa, 1939
- Bothropolys ogurii Miyosi, 1955
- Bothropolys papuanus Attems, 1914
- Bothropolys permundus (Chamberlin, 1902)
- Bothropolys richthofeni Verhoeff, 1938
- Bothropolys riedeli Matic, 1974
- Bothropolys rugosus (Meinert, 1872)
- Bothropolys shansiensis Takakuwa, 1949
- Bothropolys tricholophus Attems, 1938
- Bothropolys victorianus Chamberlin, 1925
- Bothropolys yoshidai Takakuwa, 1939
