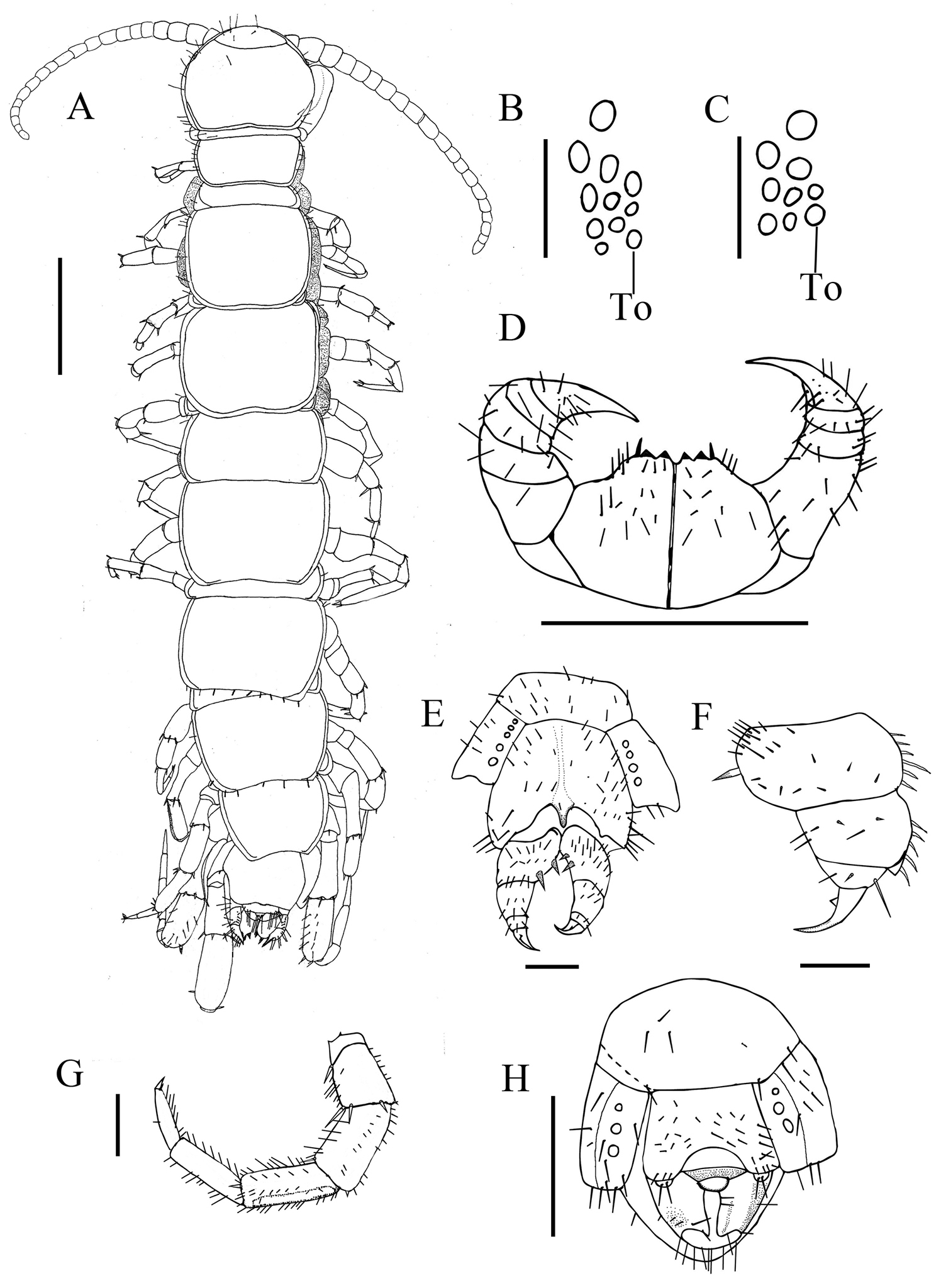
- Hessebius ruoergaiensis

Scientific classification
- Kingdom: Animalia
- Phylum: Arthropoda
- Subphylum: Myriapoda
- Class: Chilopoda
- Order: Lithobiomorpha
- Family: Lithobiidae
- Genus: Hessebius; Verhoeff, 1941

Type species
- Hessebius kosswigi Verhoeff, 1941

Diversity
- >18 species

= Hessebius =

Genus of millipedes

Hessebius is a genus of centipedes belonging to the family Lithobiidae. It is distributed in Asia (from the Middle East to Mongolia and southeast China) and North Africa.

== Species ==
The Catalogue of Life lists 18 recognized species:

- Hessebius armatus Verhoeff, 1943
- Hessebius barbipes (Porat, 1893)
- Hessebius golovatchi Farzalieva, 2017
- Hessebius jangtseanus (Verhoeff, 1942)
- Hessebius longispinipes Ma, Pei & Zhu, 2009
- Hessebius luculentus Ma, Lu, Liu, Hou & Pei, 2018
- Hessebius luquensis Qiao, Qin, Ma, Su & Zhang, 2018
- Hessebius major Folkmanová & Dobroruka, 1960
- Hessebius megapus (Muralevitch, 1907)
- Hessebius multicalcaratus Folkmanová, 1958
- Hessebius multiforaminis Pei, Ma, Zapparoli & Zhu, 2010
- Hessebius perelae Zalesskaja, 1978
- Hessebius pervagatus Zalesskaja, 1978
- Hessebius plumatus Zalesskaja, 1978
- Hessebius prospinosus Qiao, Qin, Ma & Zhang, 2019
- Hessebius ruoergaiensis Qiao, Qin, Ma, Su & Zhang, 2018
- Hessebius scythodes Volkova, 2016
- Hessebius zalesskajae Farzalieva, 2017

The list does not include some recently described species, such as Hessebius crassifemoralis and Hessebius yangi.
