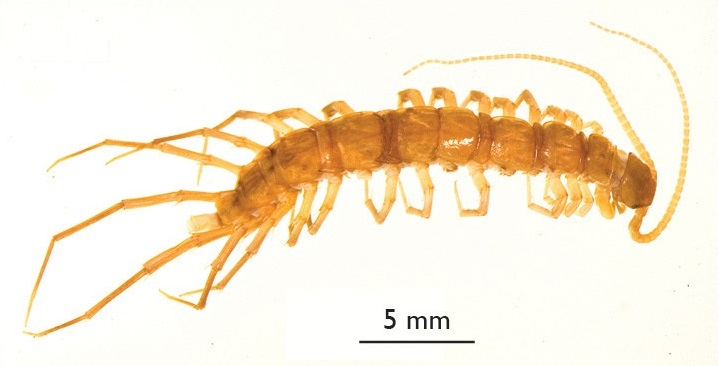
- Eupolybothrus longicornis

Scientific classification
- Kingdom: Animalia
- Phylum: Arthropoda
- Subphylum: Myriapoda
- Class: Chilopoda
- Order: Lithobiomorpha
- Family: Lithobiidae
- Genus: Eupolybothrus; Verhoeff, 1907

= Eupolybothrus =

Genus of centipedes

Eupolybothrus is a genus of centipedes in the family Lithobiidae.

The genus includes the following species:

- Eupolybothrus andreevi
- Eupolybothrus caesar
- Eupolybothrus cavernicolus
- Eupolybothrus dolops
- Eupolybothrus excellens
- Eupolybothrus fasciatus
- Eupolybothrus gloriastygis
- Eupolybothrus grossipes
- Eupolybothrus kahfi
- Eupolybothrus herzegowinensis
- Eupolybothrus imperialis
- Eupolybothrus leostygis
- Eupolybothrus litoralis
- Eupolybothrus longicornis
- Eupolybothrus nudicornis
- Eupolybothrus obrovensis
- Eupolybothrus transsylvanicus
- Eupolybothrus tabularum
- Eupolybothrus tridentinus
- Eupolybothrus werneri
- Eupolybothrus zeus
