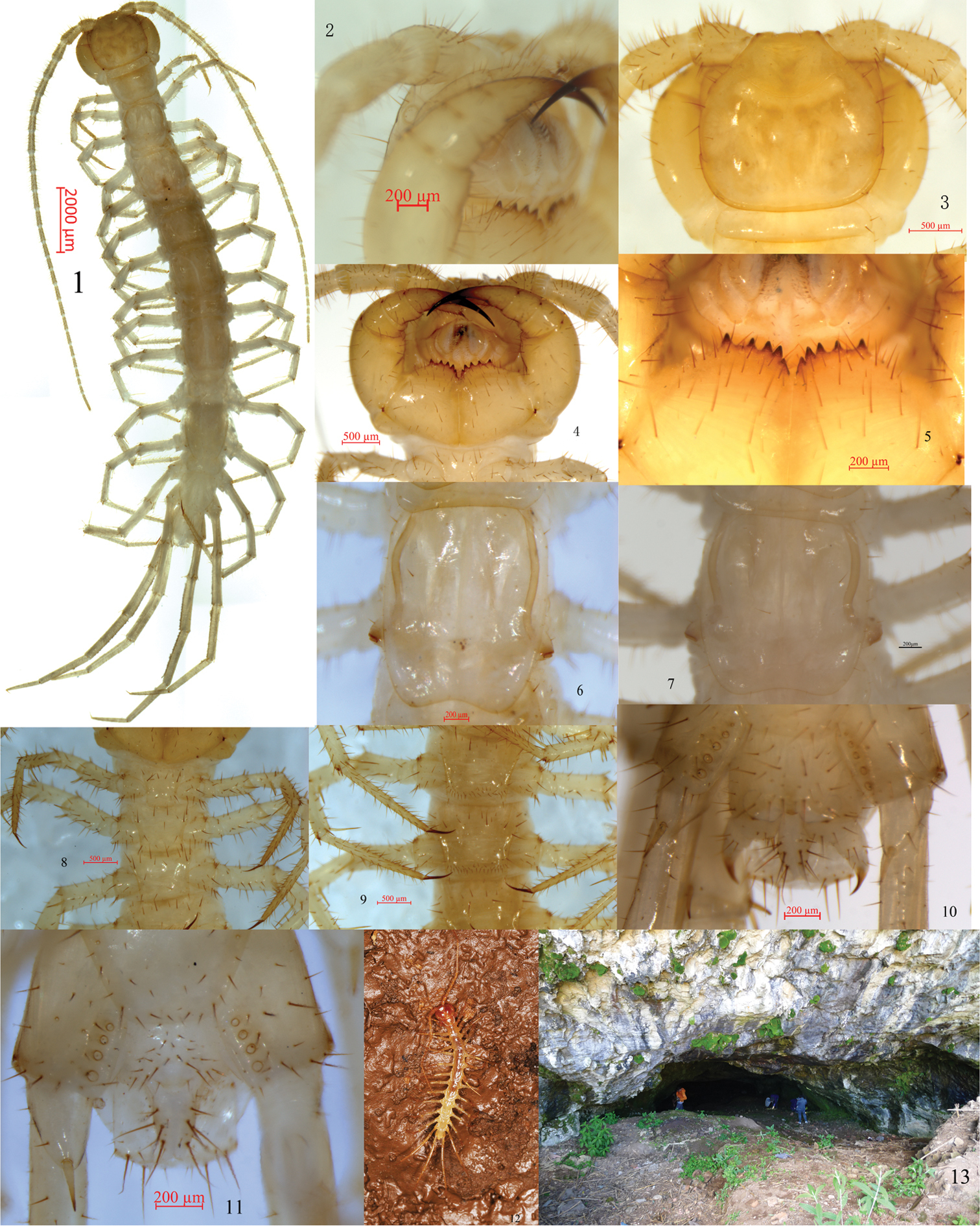
- Australobius tracheoperspicuus

Scientific classification
- Kingdom: Animalia
- Phylum: Arthropoda
- Subphylum: Myriapoda
- Class: Chilopoda
- Order: Lithobiomorpha
- Family: Lithobiidae
- Genus: Australobius; Chamberlin, 1920

Type species
- Australobius scabrior Chamberlin,1920

Synonyms
- Burmobius Chamberlin, 1944; Tamulinus Attems, 1926; Australobius (Javobius) Chamberlin, 1944; Australobius (Malayobius) Chamberlin, 1938; Australobius (Novoguinobius) Wang, 1951; Australobius (Philippinobius) Wang, 1951

= Australobius =

Genus of centipedes

Australobius is a genus of centipedes in the family Lithobiidae. It was described by American biologist Ralph Vary Chamberlin in 1920.

== Species ==
There are about 35 valid species:

- Australobius abbreviatus (Eason, 1978)
- Australobius anamagnus Ma, Song and Zhu, 2008
- Australobius apicicornis Qin, Lin, Zhao, Li, Xie, Ma, Su & Zhang, 2014
- Australobius auctus Chamberlin, 1944
- Australobius birmanicus (Pocock, 1891)
- Australobius cangshanensis Chao, Lee, Yang & Chang, 2020
- Australobius daamsae Eason, 1989
- Australobius devertens (Trozina, 1894)
- Australobius discolor (Verhoeff, 1937)
- Australobius ethodes Chamberlin, 1939
- Australobius feae (Pocock, 1891)
- Australobius indicus (Eason, 1981)
- Australobius inflatitarsis (Eason, 1978)
- Australobius javanicus (Pocock, 1894)
- Australobius loriae (Silvestri, 1894)
- Australobius magnus (Trozina, 1894)
- Australobius malabarus Chamberlin, 1944
- Australobius malaccanus (Verhoeff K.W., 1937)
- Australobius malayicus (Verhoeff, 1937)
- Australobius maroneus (Attems, 1953)
- Australobius murphyi Wang, 1967
- Australobius nodulus Ma, Song & Zhu, 2008
- Australobius palnis (Eason, 1973)
- Australobius rectifrons (Attems, 1907)
- Australobius scabrior Chamberlin, 1920
- Australobius sculpturatus (Pocock, 1901)
- Australobius sechellarum (Brölemann, 1895)
- Australobius semperi (Haase, 1887)
- Australobius sumatranus (Silvestri, 1894)
- Australobius tenuiunguis (Eason, 1980)
- Australobius tetrophthalmus (Loksa, 1960)
- Australobius tracheoperspicuus Li, Pei, Guo, Ma, Chen, 2018
- Australobius tweedii (Verhoeff K.W., 1937)
- Australobius vians Chamberlin, 1938
- Australobius viduus Attems, 1932
- Australobius weberi (Pocock, 1894)
