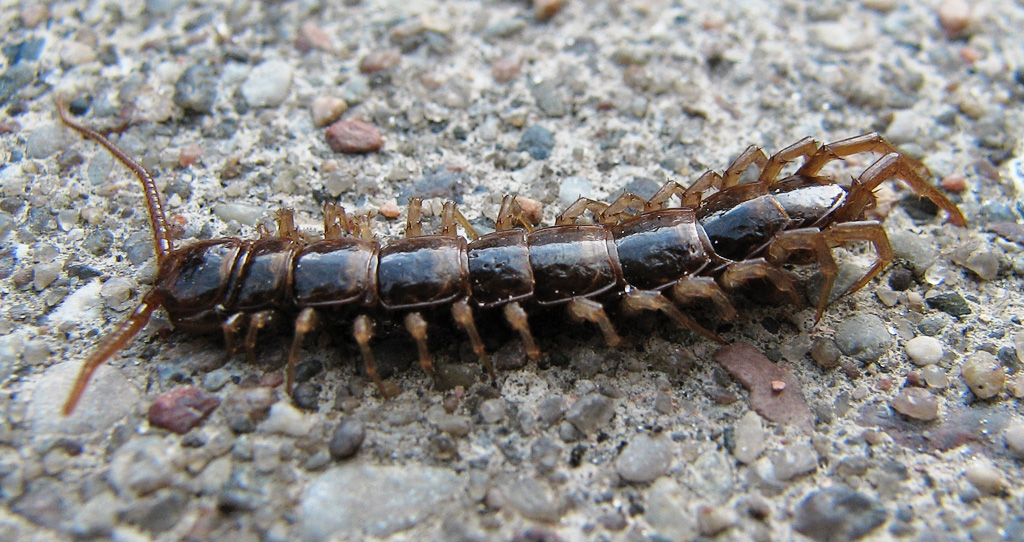
- Lithobius forficatus in Germany

Scientific classification
- Kingdom: Animalia
- Phylum: Arthropoda
- Subphylum: Myriapoda
- Class: Chilopoda
- Order: Lithobiomorpha
- Family: Lithobiidae
- Genus: Lithobius; Leach, 1814

Type species
- Scolopendra forficata Linnaeus, 1758

= Lithobius =

Genus of centipedes

Lithobius is a large genus of centipedes in the family Lithobiidae, commonly called stone centipedes, common centipedes or brown centipedes.

== Description ==
Most Lithobius species are typical representatives of the family Lithobiidae. They are about 2–5 centimetres (0.8–2.0 in) long and brownish in colour. The adult's body has 18 segments, and 15 pairs of legs. The special characteristics include the dispersed openings of coxal glands of the last pair of legs.

== Behaviour and ecology ==
Stone centipedes are found under stones or bark, in soil and decaying matter. Some are common in gardens. Lithobius forficatus is the most abundant centipede species in Europe. Like other centipedes, they are more active at night. They feed on insects and other small invertebrates. The eggs are deposited singly in soil. The lifespan can be over 3 years.

== Taxonomy ==
The genus Lithobius was erected in 1814 by William Elford Leach, in an article published in David Brewster's Edinburgh Encyclopædia. The name derives from Ancient Greek λίθος (líthos), meaning "stone", and βίος (bíos), meaning "life". Leach did not designate a type species, and none was selected until Pierre André Latreille chose Scolopendra forficata Linnaeus, 1758 (now Lithobius forficatus). Lithobius is the name-giving genus for the family Lithobiidae.

Lithobius is one of about 100 genera or subgenera in the subfamily Lithobiinae. It contains over 500 species and numerous subspecies. The classification of species inside the genus is a matter of discussion too. Some authors divide the genus into subgenera Eulithobius, Lithobius, Monotarsobius, Neolithobius, Pleurolithobius, Pseudolithobius, Sigibius, Thracolithobius and Troglolithobius.

=== Species ===
The genus Lithobius includes the following species:

- Lithobius acherontis Verhoeff, 1900
- Lithobius acipayamus Chamberlin, 1952
- Lithobius adherens Chamberlin, 1952
- Lithobius aidonensis Verhoeff, 1943
- Lithobius allotiphlus (Silvestri, 1908)
- Lithobius alpicosiensis Latzel, 1887
- Lithobius alpinus Koch, 1862 non Matic & Darabantu, 1971
- Lithobius altus Matic & Darabantu, 1971
- Lithobius ameles Chamberlin, 1952
- Lithobius angolianus Chamberlin, 1952
- Lithobius anisanus Verhoeff, 1937
- Lithobius ankarensis Verhoeff, 1944
- Lithobius anodus Latzel, 1880
- Lithobius antipai Matic, 1969
- Lithobius aostanus Verhoeff, 1934
- Lithobius apfelbecki Verhoeff, 1900
- Lithobius ardesiacus Fedrizzi, 1877
- Lithobius argaeensis Attems, 1905
- Lithobius argus Newport, 1844
- Lithobius armatus Selivanov, 1878
- Lithobius asper Muralevitch, 1926
- Lithobius athesinus Verhoeff, 1937
- Lithobius atticus Verhoeff, 1901
- Lithobius audax Meinert, 1872
- Lithobius bartsiokasi Matic & Stavropoulos, 1990
- Lithobius bebekensis (Verhoeff, 1944)
- Lithobius berkeleyensis Verhoeff, 1937
- Lithobius beroni Negrea, 1965
- Lithobius biarmatus Matic, 1970
- Lithobius bicolor Tömösvary, 1879
- Lithobius bicuspidatus (Matic, 1957)
- Lithobius bifidus Matic, 1973
- Lithobius binaghii Manfredi, 1937
- Lithobius biporus Silvestri, 1894
- Lithobius boettgeri Verhoeff, 1925
- Lithobius bolognai Zapparoli, 1991
- Lithobius bonensis Meinert, 1872
- Lithobius bosporanus (Verhoeff, 1941)
- Lithobius brachycephalus Fanzago, 1880
- Lithobius brevicornis Daday, 1889
- Lithobius buakheriacus Zapparoli, 1985
- Lithobius bulgaricus (Verhoeff, 1925)
- Lithobius bullatus Eason, 1993
- Lithobius burzenlandicus (Verhoeff, 1931)
- Lithobius buxtoni Brölemann, 1924
- Lithobius calabrensis Fedrizzi, 1878
- Lithobius calamatanus (Verhoeff, 1899)
- Lithobius canariensis Eason, 1992
- Lithobius cantabrigensis Meinert
- Lithobius capreae Verhoeff, 1943
- Lithobius carmenae Matic, 1968
- Lithobius cassinensis Verhoeff, 1925
- Lithobius castaneus Newport, 1844
- Lithobius cavernicola Fanzago, 1877
- Lithobius cerberulus Verhoeff, 1941
- Lithobius cerii Verhoeff, 1937
- Lithobius chalusensis Matic, 1969
- Lithobius chikerensis Verhoeff, 1936
- Lithobius cinnamomenus Koch, 1862
- Lithobius clarki Eason, 1975
- Lithobius communis Koch, 1844
- Lithobius consimilis Eason, 1992
- Lithobius corcyraeus Verhoeff, 1899
- Lithobius coriaceus Koch, 1862
- Lithobius corrigendus Dobroruka, 1988
- Lithobius crassipes Koch, 1862
- Lithobius creticus Dobroruka, 1977
- Lithobius crissolensis Verhoeff
- Lithobius croaticus Matic & Teodoreanu, 1967
- Lithobius cryptobius Silvestri, 1897
- Lithobius curtipes Koch, 1847
- Lithobius curtirostris Eisen & Stuxberg, 1868
- Lithobius dacicus (Matic, 1959)
- Lithobius dadayi Tömösvary, 1880
- Lithobius dahlii Verhoeff, 1925
- Lithobius degerboelae Eason, 1981 or 1986
- Lithobius demavendicus Matic, 1969
- Lithobius depressus Fanzago, 1880
- Lithobius diana Verhoeff, 1901
- Lithobius dieuzeidei Brölemann, 1931
- Lithobius discolor Verhoeff, 1937
- Lithobius doderoi Silvestri, 1908
- Lithobius dolinophilus Verhoeff, 1937
- Lithobius dollfusi Verhoeff, 1931
- Lithobius domogledicus (Matic, 1961)
- Lithobius doriae Pocock, 1890
- Lithobius drescoi Demange, 1958
- Lithobius dudichi Loksa, 1947
- Lithobius easoni Matic, 1969
- Lithobius elbanus Verhoeff, 1931
- Lithobius elbursensis Matic, 1969
- Lithobius electrinus (Verhoeff, 1937)
- Lithobius electron Verhoeff, 1928
- Lithobius electus Silvestri, 1935
- Lithobius elegans Selivanov, 1931
- Lithobius enghofi Eason, 1986
- Lithobius ercijasius Verhoeff, 1943
- Lithobius erdschiasius Verhoeff, 1943
- Lithobius errantus Chamberlin, 1952
- Lithobius erythrocephalus C.L.Koch, 1847
- Lithobius eucuemis Stuxberg
- Lithobius evae Dobroruka, 1958
- Lithobius evasus (Chamberlin, 1952)
- Lithobius excellens Silvestri, 1894
- Lithobius exiguus Meinert, 1886
- Lithobius eximius Meinert, 1872
- Lithobius falteronensis Manfredi, 1936
- Lithobius fangensis Eason, 1986
- Lithobius fanzagoi Fedrizzi, 1877
- Lithobius feae
- Lithobius femorosulcatus Eason, 1986
- Lithobius festivus Koch, 1862
- Lithobius finitimus Fanzago, 1878
- Lithobius flavus Meinert, 1872
- Lithobius forficatus (Linnaeus, 1758)
- Lithobius fossor Koch, 1862
- Lithobius franzi Attems, 1949
- Lithobius galatheae Meinert, 1886
- Lithobius geyeri Verhoeff, 1935
- Lithobius glabratus Koch, 1847
- Lithobius glacialis Verhoeff, 1937
- Lithobius gracilipes Meinert, 1872
- Lithobius gracilis Meinert, 1872
- Lithobius grandiporosus Verhoeff, 1937
- Lithobius granulatus Koch, 1862
- Lithobius gridellii Manfredi, 1955
- Lithobius grossidens Meinert, 1872
- Lithobius grossipes Koch, 1847
- Lithobius haarlovi Eason, 1986
- Lithobius hardwickei Newport, 1844
- Lithobius hatayensis Verhoeff, 1943
- Lithobius hawaiiensis Silvestri, 1904
- Lithobius helvolus Attems, 1951
- Lithobius herzegowinensis Verhoeff, 1900
- Lithobius hispanicus Meinert, 1872
- Lithobius hopanus (Chamberlin, 1952)
- Lithobius hortensis Koch, 1862
- Lithobius hummelii Verhoeff, 1933
- Lithobius ilgazensis Matic, 1983
- Lithobius immutabilis Koch, 1862
- Lithobius imperialis Meinert, 1872
- Lithobius inaequidens Fedrizzi, 1877
- Lithobius incertus Matic, 1966
- Lithobius indicus Eason, 1981
- Lithobius inexpectatus Matic, 1962
- Lithobius infossus Silvestri, 1894
- Lithobius inopinatus Matic, 1970
- Lithobius inquirendus Attems, 1951
- Lithobius insignis Meinert, 1872
- Lithobius ionicus (Silvestri, 1896)
- Lithobius iranicus Attems, 1951
- Lithobius italicus Matic, 1957
- Lithobius javanicus Pocock, 1894
- Lithobius kansuanus Verhoeff, 1933
- Lithobius karamani Verhoeff, 1937
- Lithobius kastamouensis Matic, 1983
- Lithobius koenigi Verhoeff, 1891
- Lithobius koreanus Verhoeff, 1938
- Lithobius kosswigi Chamberlin, 1952
- Lithobius kurdistanus Verhoeff, 1944
- Lithobius laccatus Attems, 1951
- Lithobius laevilabrum Leach, 1815
- Lithobius lagrecai Matic, 1962
- Lithobius lanzai Matic, 1961
- Lithobius lapadensis Verhoeff, 1900
- Lithobius latebricola Meinert, 1872
- Lithobius latzellii Meinert
- Lithobius lindbergi Chamberlin, 1956
- Lithobius litoralis Koch, 1867
- Lithobius lobifer (Chamberlin, 1952)
- Lithobius loeiensis Eason, 1986
- Lithobius lorioli Demange, 1962
- Lithobius lubricus Koch, 1862
- Lithobius lundii Meinert, 1886
- Lithobius luteus Loksa, 1947
- Lithobius macrocentrus Attems, 1949
- Lithobius magnus (Trotzina, 1894)
- Lithobius magurensis Dobroruka, 1971
- Lithobius malaccanus Verhoeff, 1937
- Lithobius malayicus Verhoeff, 1937
- Lithobius marginatus Fedrizzi, 1877
- Lithobius martensi Eason, 1989
- Lithobius matici Prunescu, 1966
- Lithobius matulicii Verhoeff, 1899
- Lithobius maximovici Folkmanova, 1946
- Lithobius mediolus Chamberlin, 1952
- Lithobius megalaporus (Stuxberg, 1875)
- Lithobius meifengensis Chao, Lee, Chang, 2018
- Lithobius melanocephalus Koch, 1863
- Lithobius memorabilis Attems, 1951
- Lithobius meridionalis Fedrizzi, 1877
- Lithobius micropodus Matic, 1983
- Lithobius microps Meinert, 1868
- Lithobius minellii Matic & Darabantu, 1971
- Lithobius minimus Koch, 1862
- Lithobius minutus Koch, 1847
- Lithobius moananus (Chamberlin, 1926)
- Lithobius moellensis Verhoeff, 1940
- Lithobius molleri Verhoeff, 1893
- Lithobius molophai Restivo de Miranda, 1978
- Lithobius mongolicus Verhoeff, 1933
- Lithobius montellicus Fanzago, 1874
- Lithobius mordax Koch, 1862
- Lithobius multidentatus Newport
- Lithobius muscorum Koch, 1862
- Lithobius nigrocullis Folkmanova, 1928
- Lithobius nocellensis Verhoeff, 1943
- Lithobius nodulipes Latzel, 1880
- Lithobius nudicornis Gervais, 1837
- Lithobius oblongus Sseliwanoff, 1881
- Lithobius obscurus Meinert, 1872
- Lithobius occultus Silvestri, 1894
- Lithobius ocraceus Fedrizzi, 1878
- Lithobius octops Menge, 1851
- Lithobius oellatus Verhoeff, 1925
- Lithobius oligoporus Latzel, 1885
- Lithobius oraniensis Matic, 1967
- Lithobius orientis (Chamberlin, 1952)
- Lithobius orotavae Latzel, 1895
- Lithobius pachypus Verhoeff, 1925
- Lithobius paghmanensis Eason, 1986
- Lithobius paidamus Chamberlin, 1952
- Lithobius palmarum Verhoeff, 1934
- Lithobius palnis (Eason, 1973)
- Lithobius palustris Selivanov, 1878
- Lithobius pantokratoris Attems, 1903
- Lithobius paradisiacus Matic & Darabantu, 1971
- Lithobius parisiensis Koch, 1862
- Lithobius parvicornis (Porat, 1893)
- Lithobius parvolus Fedrizzi, 1877
- Lithobius patriarchalis (Berlese, 1894)
- Lithobius paurus Chamberlin, 1952
- Lithobius pedemontanus Matic & Darabantu, 1971
- Lithobius peggauensis Verhoeff, 1937
- Lithobius peregrinus Latzel, 1880
- Lithobius persicus Pocock, 1899
- Lithobius piceiavus Verhoeff, 1901
- Lithobius pilatoi Matic, 1968
- Lithobius pleonops Menge, 1851
- Lithobius plesius (Chamberlin, 1952)
- Lithobius plumbeus Manfredi, 1948
- Lithobius politicus Chamberlin, 1952
- Lithobius polyodontus Attems, 1951
- Lithobius ponzianus Matic & Darabantu, 1969
- Lithobius portchinski Sseliwanoff, 1881
- Lithobius postspoliatus Verhoeff, 1942
- Lithobius potanini Selivanov, 1881
- Lithobius pseudoagilis Dobroruka, 1965
- Lithobius pubescens Koch, 1867
- Lithobius pulcher Meinert, 1872
- Lithobius purkynei Dobroruka, 1957
- Lithobius purpureus Chamberlin, 1901
- Lithobius pustulatus Matic, 1964
- Lithobius pygmaeus Latzel, 1880
- Lithobius quadridentatus Menge, 1851
- Lithobius rapax Meinert, 1872
- Lithobius radjai Étienne Iorio & Ivan Kos, 2021
- Lithobius rapitus Chamberlin, 1952
- Lithobius reiseri Verhoeff, 1900
- Lithobius remyi Jawlowski, 1923
- Lithobius rhaeticus Meinert, 1872
- Lithobius rhiknus Attems, 1951
- Lithobius riggioi Matic, 1968
- Lithobius rilaicus Verhoeff, 1937
- Lithobius ruffoi Matic, 1966
- Lithobius rupivagus Verhoeff, 1937
- Lithobius saalachiensis Verhoeff, 1937
- Lithobius salernitanus Manfredi, 1956
- Lithobius salicis Verhoeff, 1925
- Lithobius sardous Silvestri, 1897
- Lithobius sbordonii Matic, 1967
- Lithobius scabrior Chamberlin, 1920
- Lithobius schawalleri Eason, 1989
- Lithobius scotophilus Latzel, 1887
- Lithobius sculpturatus (Pocock, 1901)
- Lithobius scutigeroides Verhoeff, 1892
- Lithobius semperi Haase, 1887
- Lithobius separatus Verhoeff, 1943
- Lithobius serbicus Matic, 1979
- Lithobius sibillinicus Matic, 1966
- Lithobius sibiricus (Gerstfeldt, 1858)
- Lithobius sicheli Matic, 1986
- Lithobius silvivagus Verhoeff, 1925
- Lithobius simrothi Verhoeff, 1937
- Lithobius sitianus Chamberlin, 1956
- Lithobius sloanei Koch, 1862
- Lithobius socius Chamberlin, 1901
- Lithobius songi Pei et al., 2011
- Lithobius sordidus Koch, 1862
- Lithobius speluncarum Fanzago, 1877
- Lithobius sphinx (Verhoeff, 1941)
- Lithobius stammeri Verhoeff, 1939
- Lithobius subtilis Latzel, 1880
- Lithobius suevicus Meinert, 1863
- Lithobius sulcatus Koch, 1862
- Lithobius sumatranus Silvestri, 1895
- Lithobius svenhedini Verhoeff, 1933
- Lithobius tahirensis Matic, 1983
- Lithobius targionii Fanzago, 1874
- Lithobius tatricus Dobroruka, 1958
- Lithobius tauricus Selivanov, 1878
- Lithobius temnensis Verhoeff, 1943
- Lithobius tenuicornis Verhoeff, 1937
- Lithobius tenuinguis Eason, 1980
- Lithobius tetraspinus Pei, Lu, Liu, Hou, Ma, 2018
- Lithobius terreus Fedrizzi, 1877
- Lithobius thetidis Karsch, 1880
- Lithobius tibiosetosus Eason, 1986
- Lithobius tibiotenuis Eason, 1989
- Lithobius tidissimus (Chamberlin, 1952)
- Lithobius tiphlus (Latzel, 1886)
- Lithobius transmarinus Koch, 1862
- Lithobius trebinjanus (Verhoeff, 1900)
- Lithobius tricuspis Meinert, 1872
- Lithobius trilineatus Koch, 1862
- Lithobius trinacrius Verhoeff, 1925
- Lithobius turritanus Fanzago, 1881
- Lithobius tweedii Verhoeff, 1937
- Lithobius tylopus Latzel, 1882
- Lithobius typhlus Latzel, 1886
- Lithobius ulterior (Chamberlin, 1952)
- Lithobius uludagensis Matic, 1983
- Lithobius variegatus Leach, 1814
- Lithobius varioporus Pei et al., 2020
- Lithobius varius Koch, 1863
- Lithobius velox Koch, 1862
- Lithobius venator Koch, 1862
- Lithobius veronensis Matic & Darabantu, 1971
- Lithobius viduus Attems
- Lithobius vinciguerrae Silvestri, 1895
- Lithobius vindelicius Verhoeff, 1935
- Lithobius vinosus (Fanzago, 1874)
- Lithobius violaceus Fedrizzi, 1877
- Lithobius visicae Ribarov, 1987
- Lithobius vorax Meinert, 1872
- Lithobius vosseleri Verhoeff
- Lithobius vulgaris Leach, 1817
- Lithobius walachius Verhoeff, 1901
- Lithobius weberi Pocock, 1894
- Lithobius werneri Attems, 1902
- Lithobius zachii Restivo de Miranda, 1978
- Lithobius zeylanus (Chamberlin, 1952)
