= Edward Holt Eason =

British myriapodologist

Edward Holt Eason (1915 – 1999) was a pre-eminent British myriapodologist, as well as being a medical doctor and farmer, who carried out extensive taxonomic research on centipedes.

== Early life ==
Eason was born in Holmes Chapel in Cheshire. He was educated at Malvern College before studying medicine at Pembroke College, Cambridge and completing medical training at University College, London. During the Second World War, he served with the Royal Army Medical Corps in India and Burma. After the war, he worked briefly as a civilian pathologist. In 1948 he married Vivian Haynes and began farming in the Cotswolds, where he raised horses and beef cattle, as well as extending a youthful interest in natural history into a lifelong study of the classification of centipedes.

== Myriapodology ==
Eason carried out his taxonomic research at his laboratory on his farm. He also attended international conferences on myriapodology. As well as numerous scientific papers on centipede species from around the world, Eason wrote a 294-page monograph: Centipedes of the British Isles, published by Frederick Warne & Co. in 1964. In 1980 he received the Stamford Raffles Award, presented by the Zoological Society of London, for distinguished work on centipede taxonomy.
