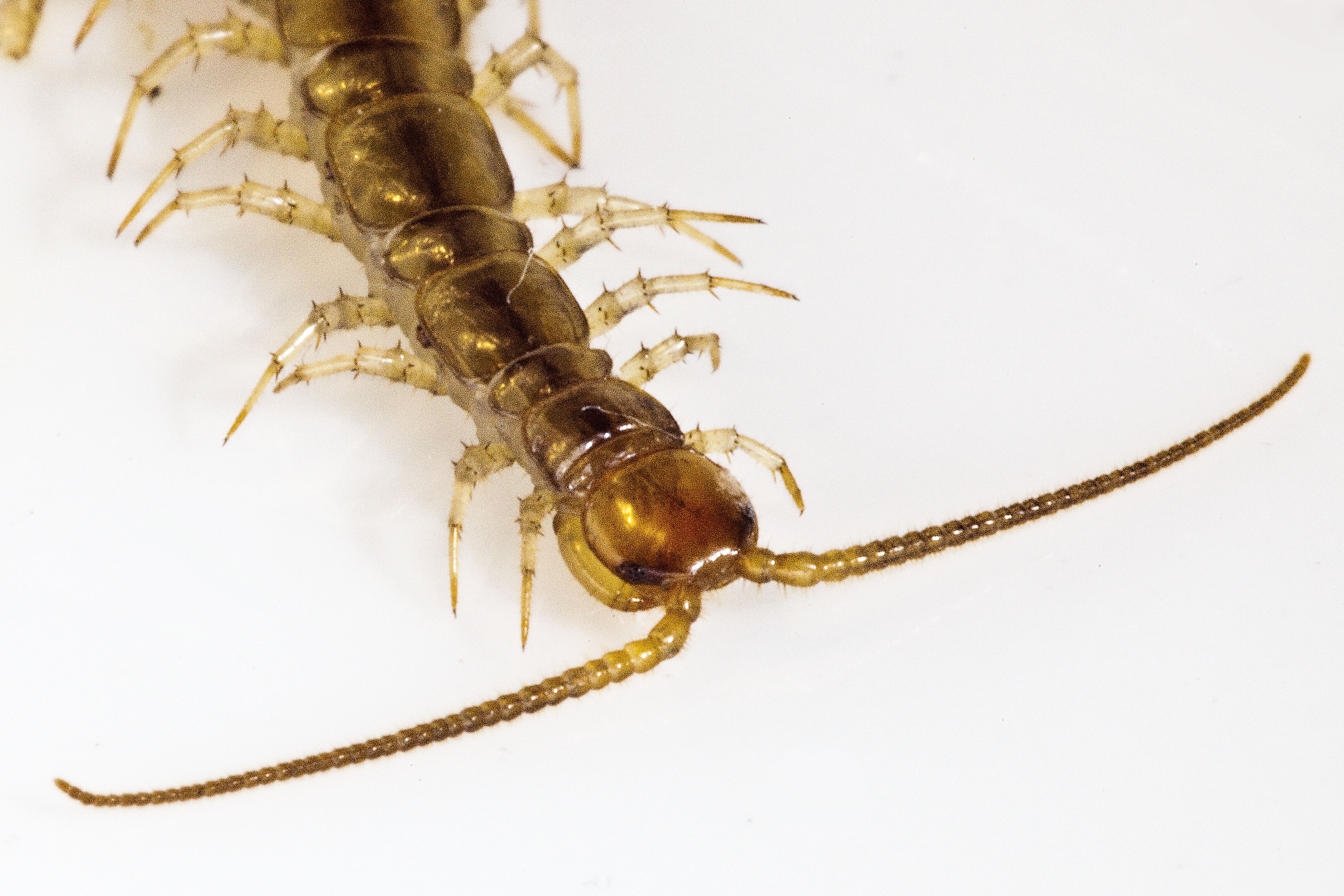

Scientific classification
- Kingdom: Animalia
- Phylum: Arthropoda
- Subphylum: Myriapoda
- Class: Chilopoda
- Order: Lithobiomorpha
- Family: Lithobiidae; Newport, 1844

Genera
- See text

= Lithobiidae =

Family of centipedes

Lithobiidae (from Ancient Greek λίθος (líthos), meaning "stone", and βίος (bíos), meaning "life") is a family of centipedes in the order Lithobiomorpha, containing the following genera:

- Alaskobius
- Anodonthobius
- Archethopolys
- Arebius
- Arenobius
- Arkansobius
- Atethobius
- Australobius
- Banobius
- Bothropolys
- Calcibius
- Cerrobius
- Cruzobius
- Dakrobius
- Delobius
- Elattobius
- Enarthrobius
- Escimobius
- Ethopolys
- Eulithobius
- Eupolybothrus
- Friobius
- Gallitobius
- Garcibius
- Garibius
- Georgibius
- Gonibius
- Gosibius
- Guambius
- Guerrobius
- Harpolithobius
- Helembius
- Hessebius
- Juanobius
- Kiberbius
- Labrobius
- Liobius
- Lithobius
- Llanobius
- Lobochaetotarsus
- Lophobius
- Malbius
- Mayobius
- Metalithobius
- Mexicobius
- Mexicotarsus
- Monotarsobius
- Nadabius
- Nampabius
- Neolithobius
- Nipponobius
- Nothembius
- Nuevobius
- Oabius
- Ottobius
- Paitobius
- Paobius
- Pholobius
- Photofugia
- Physobius
- Planobius
- Pleurolithobius
- Pokabius
- Popobius
- Pseudolithobius
- Pterygotergum
- Schizotergitius
- Serrobius
- Shosobius
- Simobius
- Sonibius
- Sotimpius
- Sozibius
- Taiyubius
- Texobius
- Tidabius
- Tigobius
- Tropobius
- Typhlobius
- Uncobius
- Vulcanbius
- Watobius
- Zinapolys
- Zygethopolys
