= Bollmaniulus catalinae =

Scientific classification
- Kingdom: Animalia
- Phylum: Arthropoda
- Subphylum: Myriapoda
- Class: Diplopoda
- Order: Julida
- Family: Parajulidae
- Genus: Bollmaniulus
- Species: B. catalinae

Binomial name
- Bollmaniulus catalinae (Chamberlin, 1940)

Synonyms
- Caliulus catalinae

Species of millipede

Bollmaniulus catalinae is a species of millipede endemic to Pimu (Santa Catalina Island) in California
