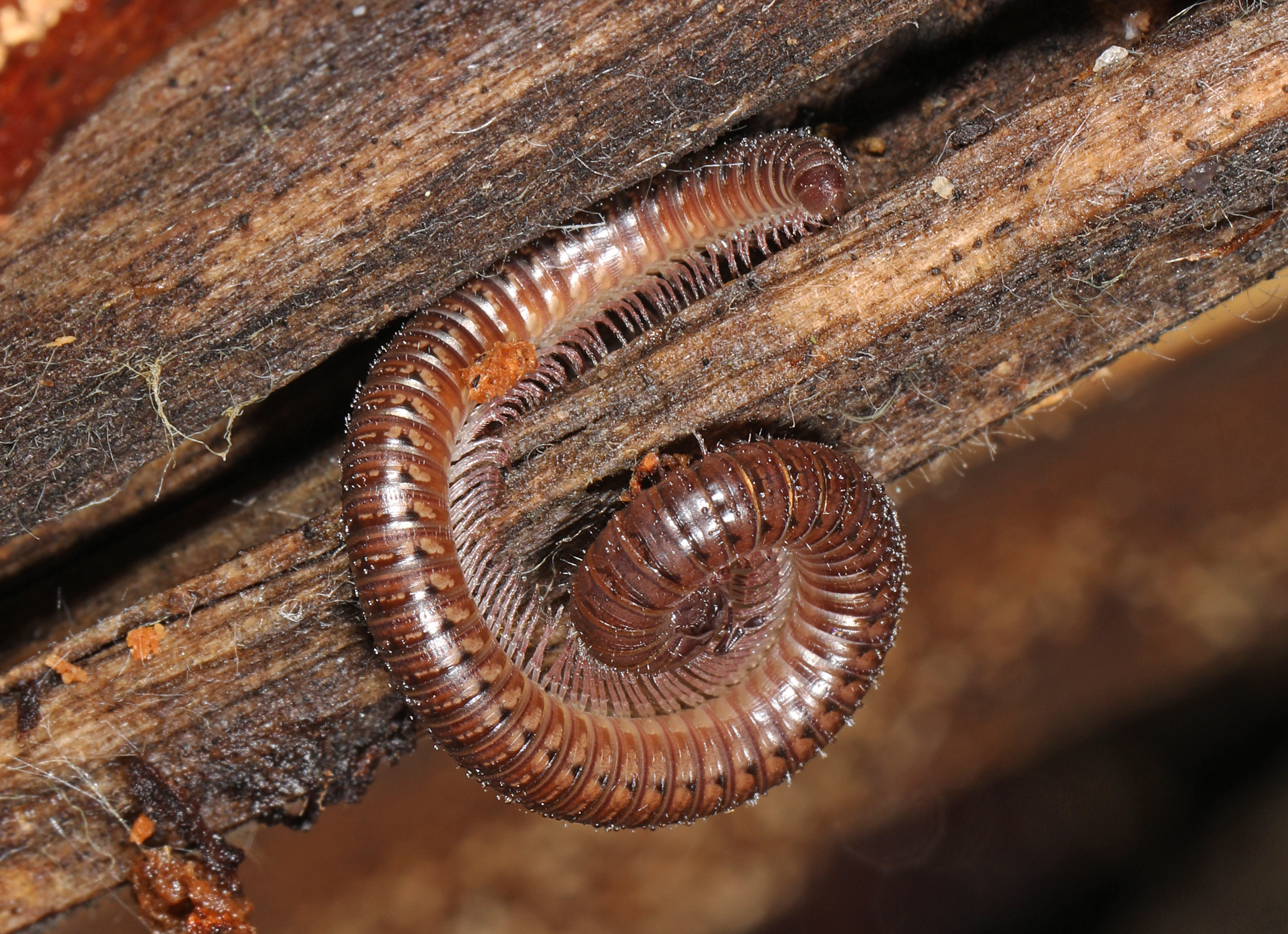

Scientific classification
- Kingdom: Animalia
- Phylum: Arthropoda
- Subphylum: Myriapoda
- Class: Diplopoda
- Order: Julida
- Family: Parajulidae
- Genus: Ptyoiulus
- Species: P. impressus

Binomial name
- Ptyoiulus impressus (Say, 1821)

= Ptyoiulus impressus =

Species of millipede

Ptyoiulus impressus is a species of millipede in the family Parajulidae. It is found in North America.
