= Aniulus garius =

Scientific classification
- Kingdom: Animalia
- Phylum: Arthropoda
- Subphylum: Myriapoda
- Class: Diplopoda
- Order: Julida
- Family: Parajulidae
- Genus: Aniulus
- Species: A. garius

Binomial name
- Aniulus garius (Chamberlin, 1912)

Species of millipede

Aniulus garius is a species of millipede in the family Parajulidae. It is found in North America.
