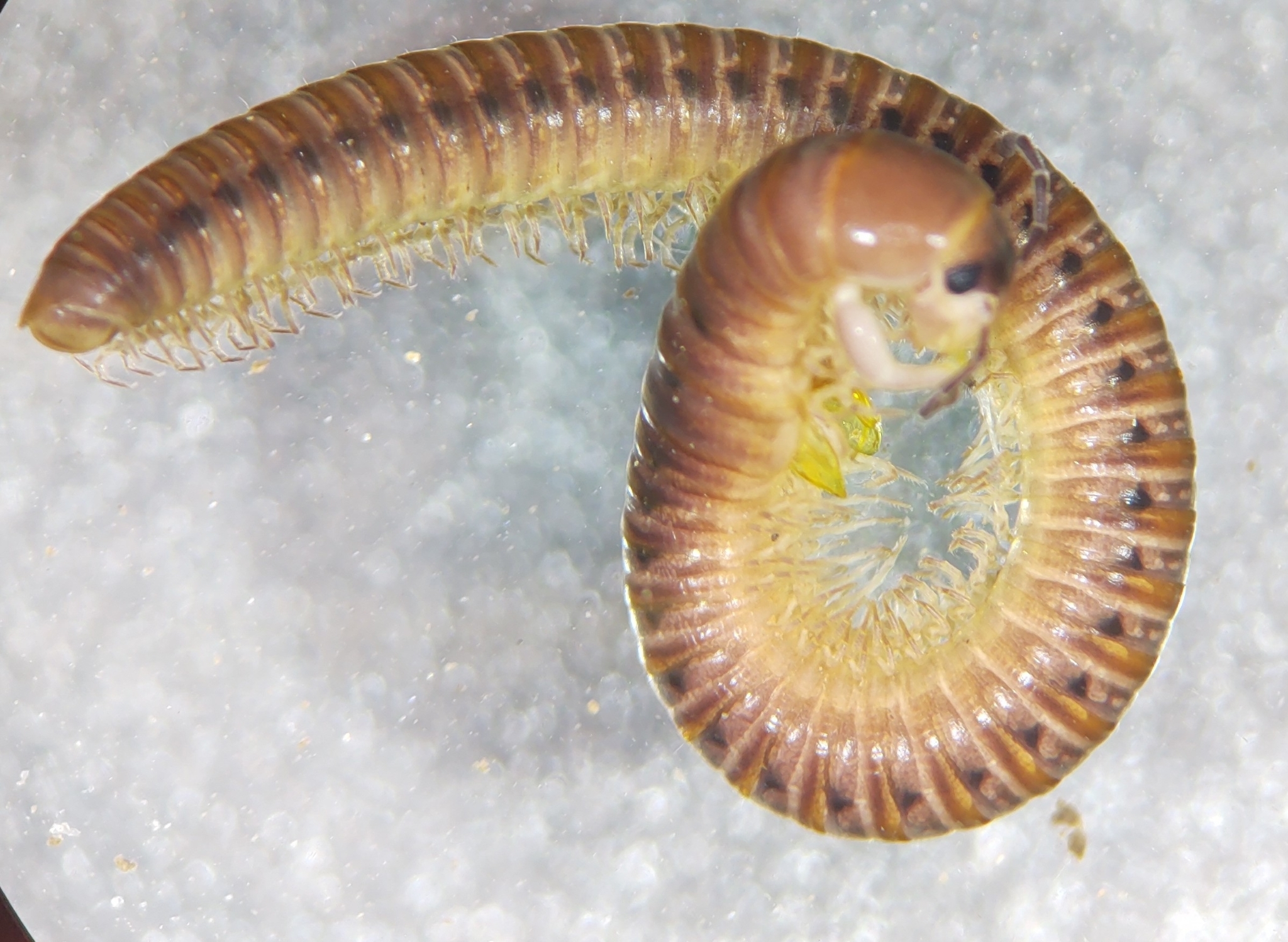

Scientific classification
- Kingdom: Animalia
- Phylum: Arthropoda
- Subphylum: Myriapoda
- Class: Diplopoda
- Order: Julida
- Family: Parajulidae
- Genus: Oriulus
- Species: O. venustus

Binomial name
- Oriulus venustus (Wood, 1864)

Synonyms
- List: Iulus venustus Wood, 1864; Julus venustus Preudhomme de Borre, 1884; Parajulus rugosus Bollman, 1887; Paraiulus venustus Bollman, 1888; Oriulus medianus Chamberlin, 1940; Oriulus delus Chamberlin, 1940; Oriulus eutypus Chamberlin, 1940; Oriulus notus Chamberlin, 1940; Oriulus georgicolens Chamberlin, 1940; Oriulus grayi Causey, 1950; Aliulus rugosus Causey, 1952; Aniulus venustus Johnson, 1954; Oriulus grandiceps Loomis, 1968; Oriulus disjunctus Stewart, 1969; Aniulus carolinensis Shelley, 2000

= Oriulus venustus =

Species of millipede

Oriulus venustus is a species of millipede in the family Parajulidae. It is found in North America.

== Description ==
Adults are around 19 to 26 millimeters in length and 1.5 to 2.5 millimeters wide. Males of this species can be identified by their enlarged sternum 8 that extends dorsally into the body cavity and their sigmoid, crossing gonopodal telopodites.

== Distribution and habitat ==
Oriulus venustus covers most of North America north of Mexico and east of the Rocky Mountains, though its distribution becomes sporadic in the south-eastern United States.
