= Aniulus =

Scientific classification
- Kingdom: Animalia
- Phylum: Arthropoda
- Subphylum: Myriapoda
- Class: Diplopoda
- Order: Julida
- Family: Parajulidae
- Genus: Aniulus; Chamberlin, 1940

Genus of millipedes

Aniulus is a genus of millipedes in the family Parajulidae. There are more than 20 described species in Aniulus.

== Species ==
These 26 species belong to the genus Aniulus:

- Aniulus acuminatus Loomis, 1976
- Aniulus adelphus Chamberlin, 1940
- Aniulus annectans (Chamberlin, 1921)
- Aniulus austinensis Chamberlin, 1940
- Aniulus bollmani Causey, 1952
- Aniulus brachygon Shelley, 2000
- Aniulus brazonus Chamberlin, 1940
- Aniulus brevis Shelley, 2000
- Aniulus causeyae Shelley, 2000
- Aniulus craterus Chamberlin, 1940
- Aniulus dorophor Chamberlin, 1940
- Aniulus fili Loomis, 1975
- Aniulus fluviatilis Chamberlin, 1940
- Aniulus garius (Chamberlin, 1912)
- Aniulus hopius Chamberlin, 1941
- Aniulus houstonensis Shelley, 2000
- Aniulus kopius Chamberlin
- Aniulus nigrans (Chamberlin, 1918)
- Aniulus oreines Chamberlin, 1940
- Aniulus orientalis Causey, 1952
- Aniulus orthodoxus Chamberlin, 1946
- Aniulus paiutus (Chamberlin, 1925)
- Aniulus paludicolens Causey, 1967
- Aniulus paludicolus Causey
- Aniulus prosoicus Chamberlin, 1940
- Aniulus vestigialis Loomis, 1959
