= Oriulus =

Scientific classification
- Kingdom: Animalia
- Phylum: Arthropoda
- Subphylum: Myriapoda
- Class: Diplopoda
- Order: Julida
- Family: Parajulidae
- Genus: Oriulus; Chamberlin, 1940

Genus of millipedes

Oriulus is a genus of millipedes in the family Parajulidae. There are about eight described species in Oriulus.

== Species ==
These eight species belong to the genus Oriulus:

- Oriulus delus Chamberlin, 1940
- Oriulus eutypus Chamberlin, 1940
- Oriulus georgicolens Chamberlin, 1940
- Oriulus grandiceps Loomis, 1968
- Oriulus grayi Causey, 1950
- Oriulus medianus Chamberlin, 1940
- Oriulus notus Chamberlin, 1940
- Oriulus venustus (Wood, 1864)
