= Bollmaniulus =

Scientific classification
- Kingdom: Animalia
- Phylum: Arthropoda
- Subphylum: Myriapoda
- Class: Diplopoda
- Order: Julida
- Family: Parajulidae
- Genus: Bollmaniulus; Verhoeff, 1926

Synonyms
- Caliulus Chamberlin, 1940; Taijulus Chamberlin, 1938; Taiulus Chamberlin, 1940

Genus of millipede

Bollmaniulus is a genus of millipede in the family Parajulidae.

The following species are accepted within Bollmaniulus:

- Bollmaniulus catalinae (Chamberlin, 1940)
- Bollmaniulus concolor (Chamberlin, 1940)
- Bollmaniulus furcifer (Harger, 1872)
- Bollmaniulus hewitti (Chamberlin, 1919)
- Bollmaniulus montanae (Chamberlin, 1940)
- Bollmaniulus olympus (Causey, 1953)
- Bollmaniulus olympus Chamberlin, 1940
- Bollmaniulus pachysomus (Chamberlin, 1940)
- Bollmaniulus pearcei (Chamberlin, 1943)
- Bollmaniulus pugetensis (Chamberlin, 1940)
- Bollmaniulus rhodogeus (Chamberlin, 1940)
- Bollmaniulus signifer (Chamberlin, 1941)
- Bollmaniulus spenceri Chamberlin, 1951
- Bollmaniulus tiganus (Chamberlin, 1910)
