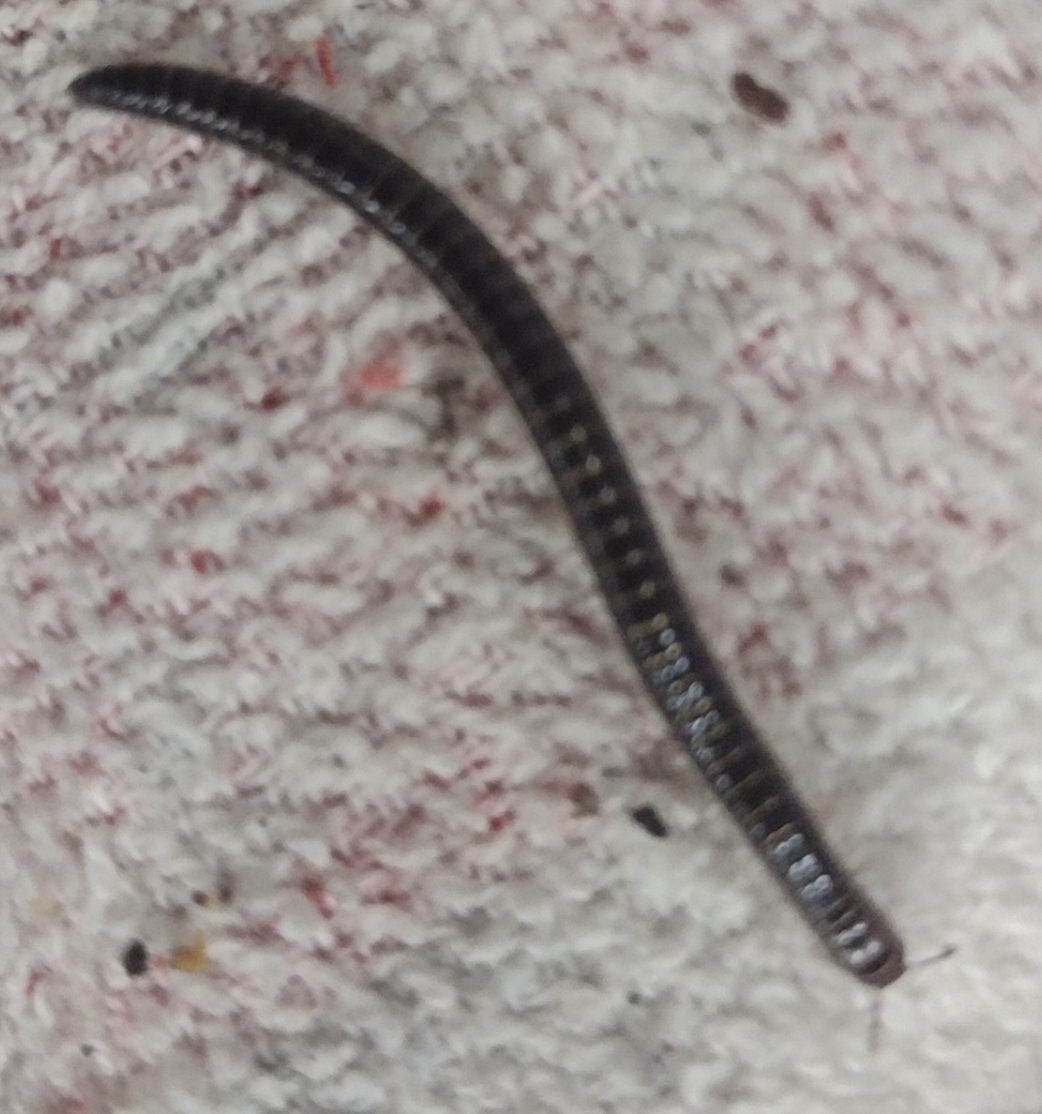

Scientific classification
- Kingdom: Animalia
- Phylum: Arthropoda
- Subphylum: Myriapoda
- Class: Diplopoda
- Order: Julida
- Family: Parajulidae
- Genus: Litiulus; Chamberlin, 1940
- Species: L. alaskanus

Binomial name
- Litiulus alaskanus (Cook, 1905)

Synonyms
- Species synonymy: Parajulus alaskanus Cook, 1905

= Litiulus =

Species of myriapod

Litiulus is a genus of millipedes of the order Julida. It is monotypic, with the only species Litiulus alaskanus. It feeds primarily on fruiting fungal bodies, and occasionally species of slime molds. It thrives in northeastern Pacific old growth rainforests. It may be uniquely adapted to be hardier than other species of millipedes that share its range, with an ability to endure harsher and drier climates.

== Range ==
Litiulus alaskanus can be found from Tlingit territory towards its northern extent to Haida territory towards its southern extent.

== Habitat ==
Litiulus alaskanus grows in northeastern Pacific coastal evergreen rainforests. It flourishes in wet, hypermaritime forested ecosystems where fungi grow in abundance.

== Etymology ==
Litiulus alaskanus translates to "Alaskan beach" in Latin.
