= Ptyoiulus =

Scientific classification
- Kingdom: Animalia
- Phylum: Arthropoda
- Subphylum: Myriapoda
- Class: Diplopoda
- Order: Julida
- Family: Parajulidae
- Genus: Ptyoiulus; Cook, 1895

Genus of millipedes

Ptyoiulus is a genus of millipedes in the family Parajulidae. There are about seven described species in Ptyoiulus.

== Species ==
These seven species belong to the genus Ptyoiulus:

- Ptyoiulus conveanus Chamberlin, 1943
- Ptyoiulus coveanus Chamberlin, 1943
- Ptyoiulus ectenes (Bollman, 1887)
- Ptyoiulus georgiensis Chamberlin, 1943
- Ptyoiulus impressus (Say, 1821)
- Ptyoiulus montanus
- Ptyoiulus pennsylvanicus (Brandt, 1840)
