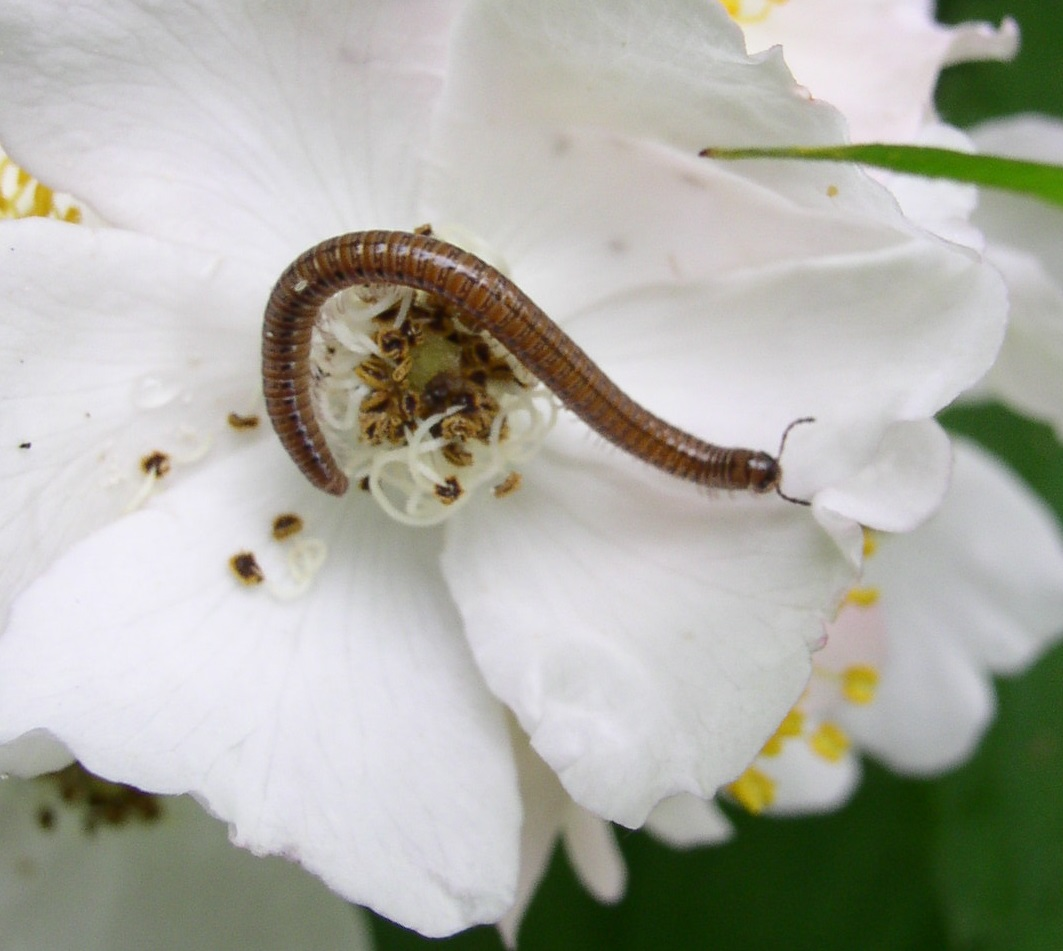
- Unidentified Parajulidae sp.

Scientific classification
- Kingdom: Animalia
- Phylum: Arthropoda
- Subphylum: Myriapoda
- Class: Diplopoda
- Order: Julida
- Family: Parajulidae; Bollman, 1893

Synonyms
- Parajulinae Bollman, 1893; Uroblaniulinae Attems, 1909; Ptyoiulinae Causey, 1974

= Parajulidae =

Family of millipedes

Parajulidae is a family of millipedes in the order Julida, occurring predominantly in North America but also in Central America and East Asia. Parajulids are found from Alaska to as far south as Guatemala. Male Parajulids have a greatly enlarged first pair of legs, and externally exposed gonopods, in contrast to the largely Eurasian family Julidae which have a small, hook-shaped first pair of legs, and gonopods concealed internally.

== Genera ==
- Aliulus
- Aniulus
- Apacheiulus
- Arvechamboides
- Arvechambus
- Bollmaniulus
- Codiulus
- Ethoiulus
- Ethojulus
- Georgiulus
- Gosiulus
- Gyniulus
- Hakiulus
- Karteroiulus
- Litiulus
- Mexicoiulus
- Mulaikiulus
- Nesoressa
- Okliulus
- Oriulus
- Parajulus
- Pheniulus
- Pseudojulus
- Ptyoiulus
- Saiulus
- Simiulus
- Sophiulus
- Spathiulus
- Teniulus
- Thriniulus
- Tuniulus
- Uroblaniulus
- Ziniulus
