= Cobbania hickeyi =

Scientific classification
- Kingdom: Plantae
- Clade: Tracheophytes
- Clade: Angiosperms
- Clade: Monocots
- Order: Alismatales
- Family: Araceae
- Genus: †Cobbania
- Species: †C. hickeyi

Binomial name
- †Cobbania hickeyi Stockey, G.W. Rothwell, K.R. Johnson

Extinct species of floating plant

Cobbania hickeyi is an extinct species of floating plant in the family Araceae, sharing similarities with modern-day water lettuce.
