= Spodoptera praefica =

Western yellow-striped armyworm

Scientific classification
- Kingdom: Animalia
- Phylum: Arthropoda
- Clade: Pancrustacea
- Class: Insecta
- Order: Lepidoptera
- Superfamily: Noctuoidea
- Family: Noctuidae
- Genus: Spodoptera
- Species: S. praefica

Binomial name
- Spodoptera praefica (Grote, 1875)

Synonyms
- Prodenia praefica Grote, 1875

Species of moth

Spodoptera praefica, the western yellow-striped armyworm, is a moth of the family Noctuidae found from British Columbia to California, east to Utah, and north to Alberta. As of 4 October 2021 it is absent from the EPPO (European and Mediterranean Plant Protection Organization) area, but is considered a high risk for invasion there.

The wingspan is 35–40 millimetres (1 3/8–1 9/16 in). It is similar in appearance to Spodoptera ornithogalli, but S. praefica's fore-wings are paler and lack the blurry white stripe. The hind-wings of S. praefica are white or gray and have a small brown dot on the ventral side. Adults are on wing from March to April and from August to September.

The larvae are black with yellow stripes and an inverted "y" marking on the head. They feed on the leaves of various herbaceous plants including agricultural crops such as alfalfa, potato, rice, sugar beet, and sweet potato.
