= Sod Solutions =

Sod company founded in 1994

Sod Solutions, Inc.
- Company type: Private
- Industry: Sod
- Headquarters: Mount Pleasant, South Carolina, United States
- Key people: Tobey Wagner
- Owner: Tobey Wagner
- Website: sodsolutions.com

Sod Solutions, founded in 1994, develops and markets patented turfgrass varieties. The company's products include Celebration Bermudagrass and Discovery Bermudagrass.

== Turfgrass ==
On May 30, 2012, a partnership was announced between 21 Florida sod producers from the Florida Sod Growers Cooperative and turfgrass researchers at the University of Florida in attempt to create improved zoysiagrass varieties.

Testing will evaluate varieties for resistance to disease, drought, and shade tolerance, ability to retain color in cooler weather, and resistance to pests such as billbug, armyworm, and sod webworm. The program expected to have new grasses ready by 2017.

Sod Solutions is coordinating this partnership and will license and market the new grasses.

== See also ==
- Sod
- Lawn
