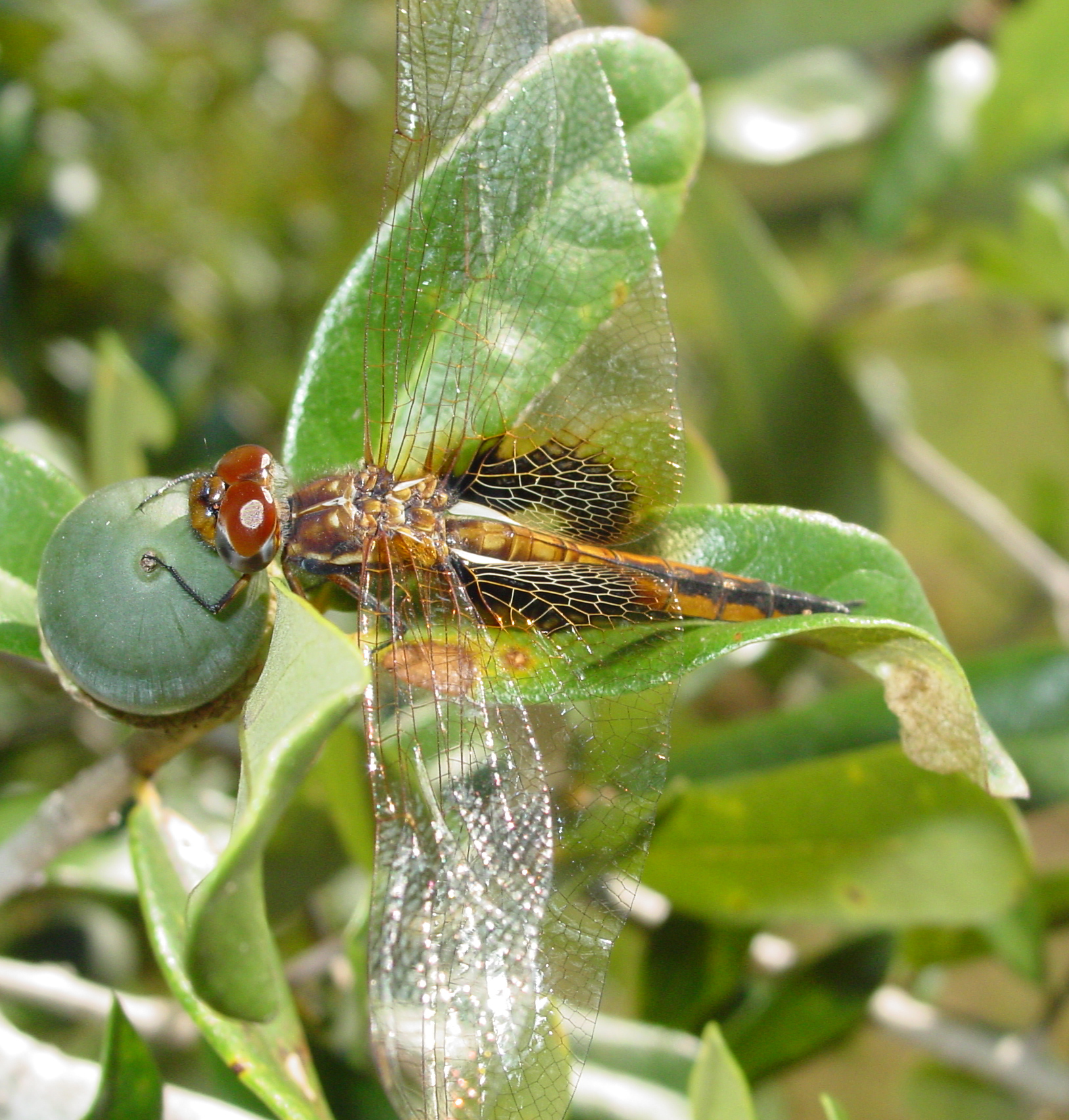
- Hyacinth Glider

Scientific classification
- Kingdom: Animalia
- Phylum: Arthropoda
- Class: Insecta
- Order: Odonata
- Infraorder: Anisoptera
- Family: Libellulidae
- Subfamily: Trameinae
- Tribe: Trameini
- Genus: Miathyria; Kirby, 1889

= Miathyria =

Genus of dragonflies

Miathyria is a Neotropical genus of dragonflies. They are commonly known as Hyacinth Gliders. One species, M. marcella, occurs in North America. They are associated with floating plants, especially Water Hyacinth or Water Lettuce.

The genus contains only two species:

- Miathyria marcella (Selys in Sagra, 1857) - Hyacinth Glider
- Miathyria simplex (Rambur, 1842) - Dwarf Glider
