= Cobbania corrugata =

Cobbania corrugata Temporal range: Late Cretaceous, 76–65.95 Ma

Scientific classification
- Kingdom: Plantae
- Clade: Tracheophytes
- Clade: Angiosperms
- Clade: Monocots
- Order: Alismatales
- Family: Araceae
- Genus: †Cobbania
- Species: †C. corrugata

Binomial name
- †Cobbania corrugata (Lesq.) Stockey, G.W. Rothwell, K.R. Johnson

Synonyms
- Pistia corrugata

Extinct species of floating plant

Cobbania corrugata is an extinct species of floating aroid similar to modern-day water lettuce. It is the type species of the genus Cobbania.

It was included in the genus Pistia when it was first described by Leo Lesquereux in 1876, but it now sits in its own genus, Cobbania.
