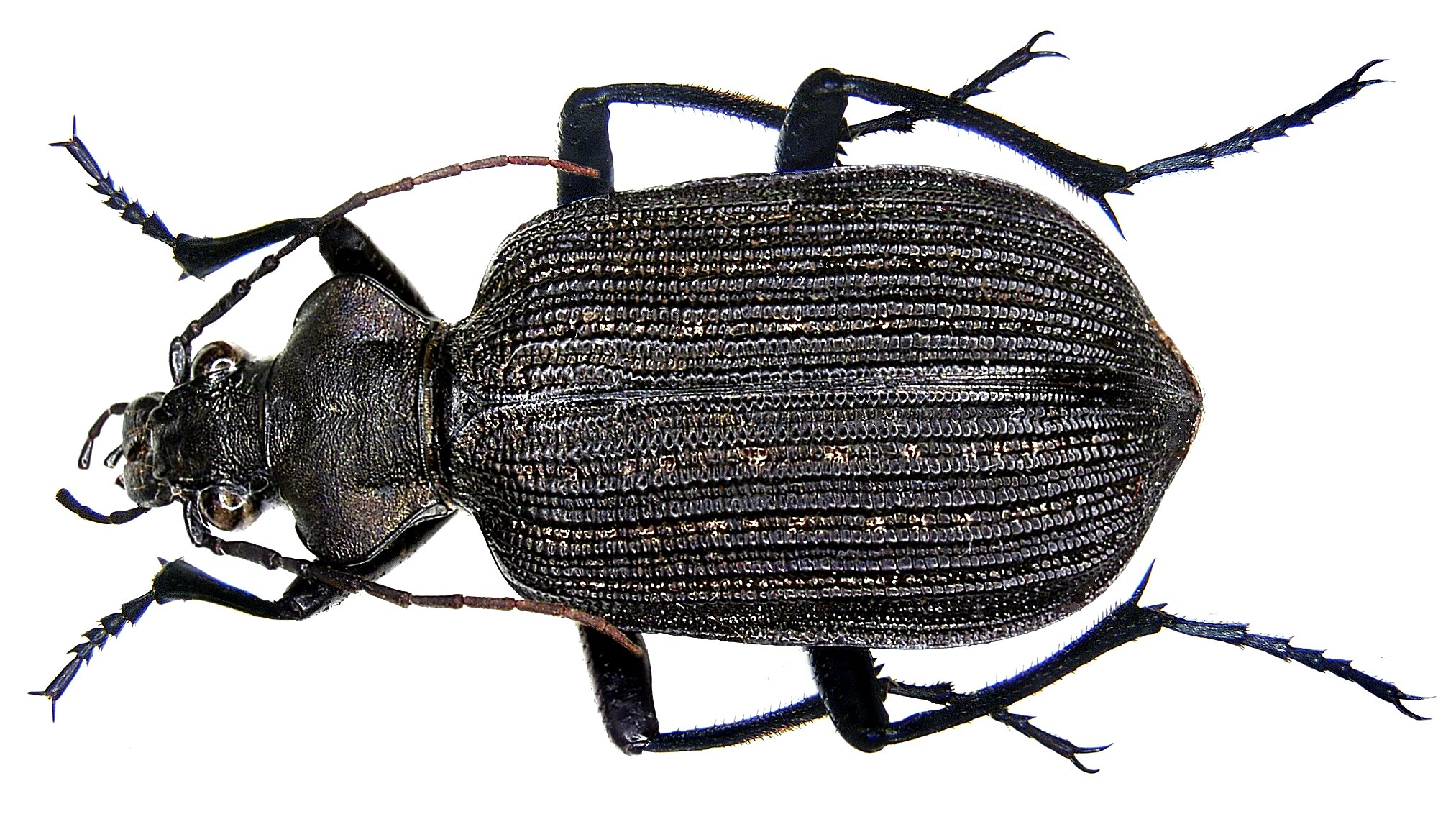

Scientific classification
- Kingdom: Animalia
- Phylum: Arthropoda
- Class: Insecta
- Order: Coleoptera
- Suborder: Adephaga
- Family: Carabidae
- Genus: Calosoma
- Species: C. senegalense

Binomial name
- Calosoma senegalense Dejean, 1831

Synonyms
- Calosoma mosambicense Klug, 1853

= Calosoma senegalense =

Species of beetle

Calosoma senegalense is a species of ground beetle in the subfamily of Carabinae. It was described by Dejean in 1831. This species is found in Cape Verde, Mauretania, Senegal/Gambia, Sierra Leone, Burkina Faso, Niger, Chad, Sudan, DR Congo, Kenya, Tanzania, Angola, Mozambique, Zimbabwe, Botswana, Namibia, South Africa and Madagascar.

Adults reach a length of 25-30 mm and have a dark bronze colour. Adults are diurnal and nocturnal.

They prey on other insects, and was introduced to Hawaii as a possible predator of Spodoptera mauritia, but acclimatization was unsuccessful.
