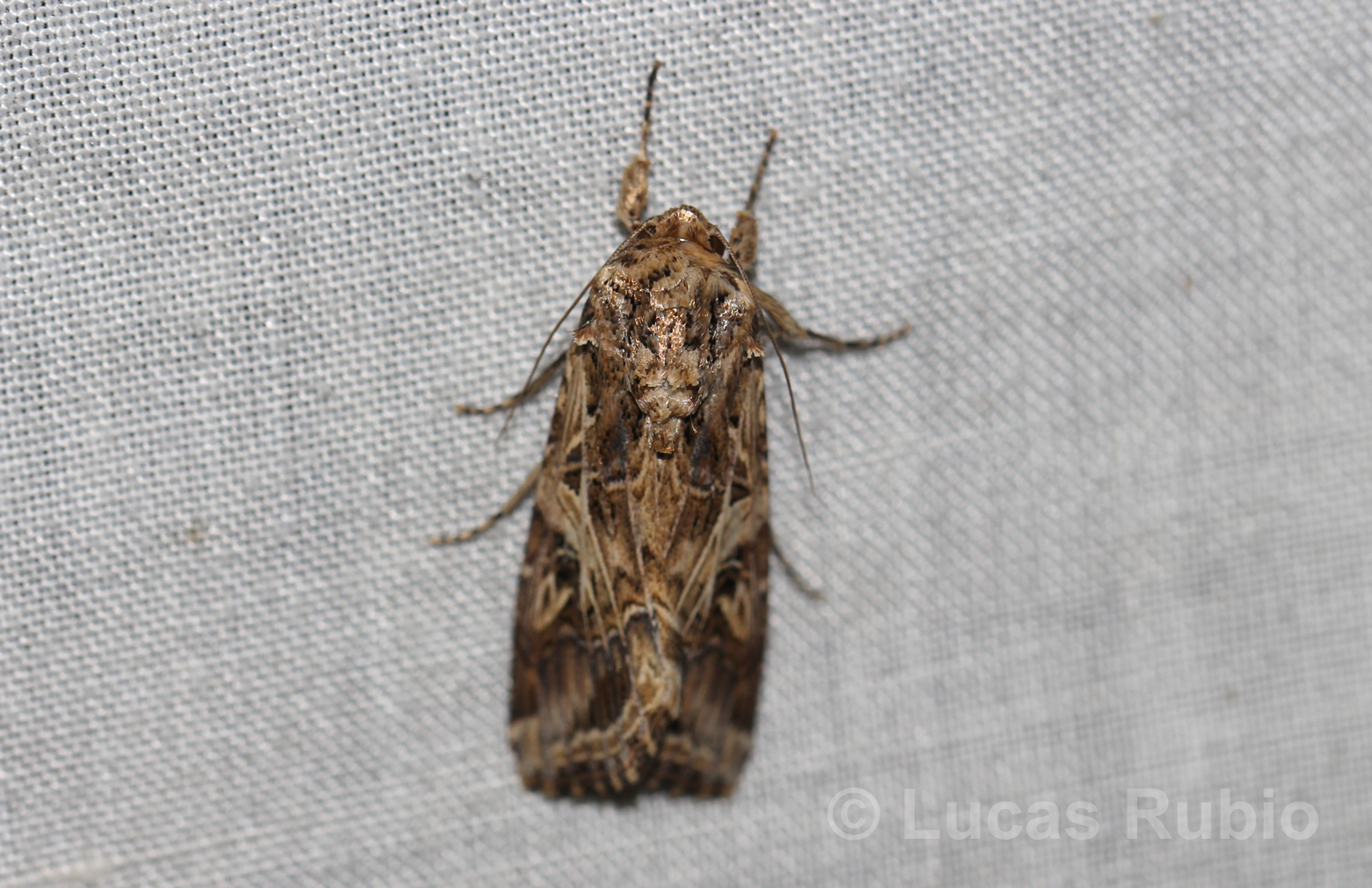

Scientific classification
- Kingdom: Animalia
- Phylum: Arthropoda
- Class: Insecta
- Order: Lepidoptera
- Superfamily: Noctuoidea
- Family: Noctuidae
- Genus: Spodoptera
- Species: S. cosmioides

Binomial name
- Spodoptera cosmioides Walker, 1858

= Spodoptera cosmioides =

Species of moth

Spodoptera cosmioides is an armyworm moth of the family Noctuidae found in Central America and South America (from Panama and Trinidad south to Argentina).

== Taxonomy ==
Walker (1858) originally described cosmioides, placing it in the genus Prodenia.

Basionym: Prodenia cosmioides Walker, 1858.

Pogue (2002) revived S. cosmioides (Walker, 1858), as a valid species (though misspelled as S. cosmiodes), from synonymy with S. latifascia (Walker, 1856).

== Description ==
The wingspan is about 38 to 42 mm (1.5 to 1.7 in).

== Ecology ==
No host plants are listed for S. cosmioides on the HOSTS database of the Natural History Museum, London. However, S. cosmioides and closely related congeners feed on many herbaceous plants and are regarded as pests thereof (e.g. da Silva et al., 2017).

== Geography ==
Type Locality: Pará, Brazil.

Pogue (2002) saw voucher material from the following countries: Argentina, Bolivia, Brazil, Colombia, Costa Rica, Ecuador, French Guiana, Guyana, Panama, Paraguay, Peru, Trinidad, Venezuela.

== Similar species ==
- Spodoptera latifascia (Walker, 1856)
- Spodoptera descoinsi Lalanne-Cassou & Silvain, 1994

(see Pogue, 2002) for differences
