= Spodoptera apertura =

Scientific classification
- Kingdom: Animalia
- Phylum: Arthropoda
- Clade: Pancrustacea
- Class: Insecta
- Order: Lepidoptera
- Superfamily: Noctuoidea
- Family: Noctuidae
- Genus: Spodoptera
- Species: S. apertura

Binomial name
- Spodoptera apertura (Walker, 1865)

Synonyms
- Prodenia apertura Walker, 1865; Prodenia leucophlebia Hampson, 1902; Prodenia synstictis Hampson, 1896

Species of moth

Spodoptera apertura is a moth of the family Noctuidae first described by Francis Walker in 1865. It is known from China, India, Sri Lanka, South Africa, Madagascar and Australia.
