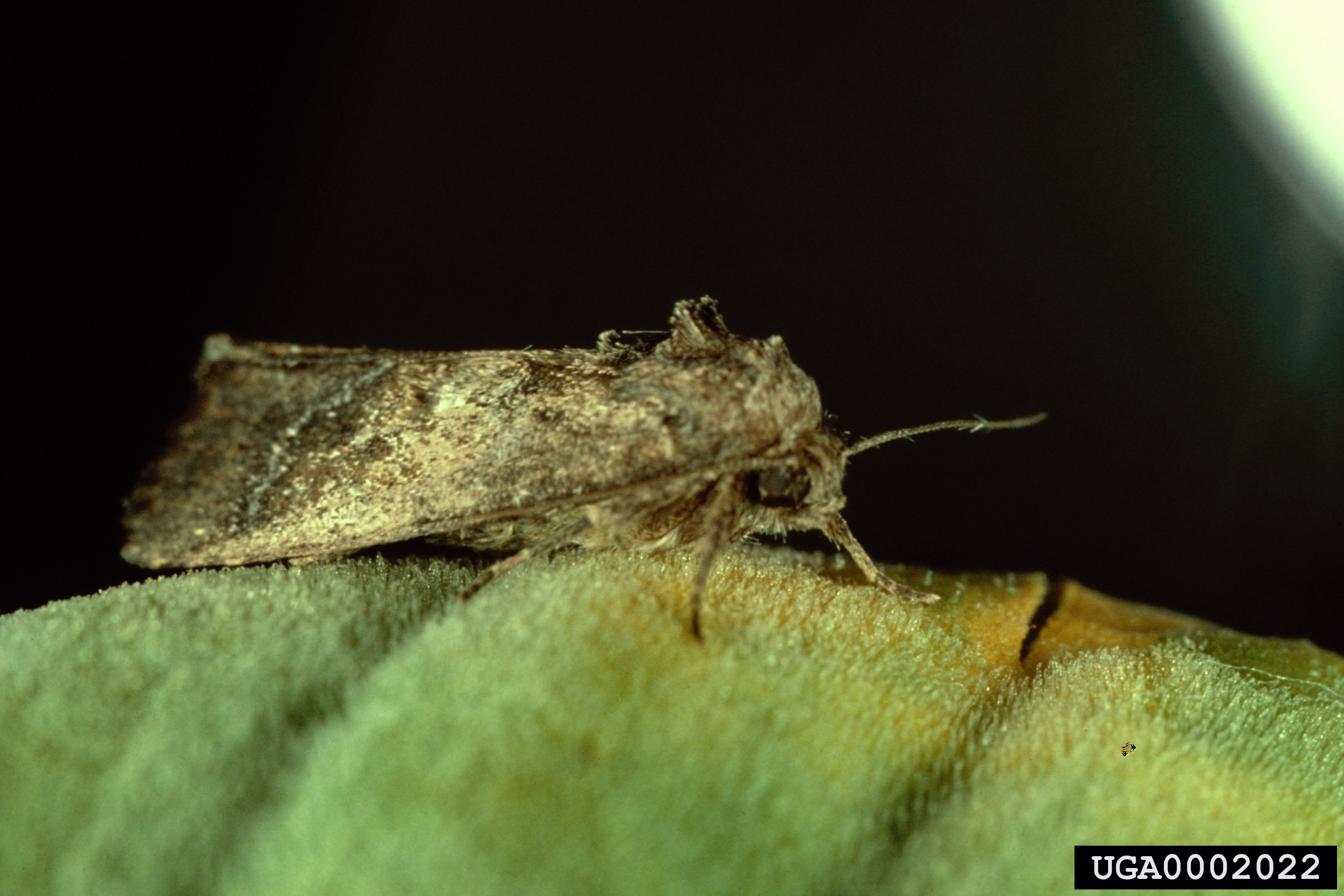

Scientific classification
- Kingdom: Animalia
- Phylum: Arthropoda
- Clade: Pancrustacea
- Class: Insecta
- Order: Lepidoptera
- Superfamily: Noctuoidea
- Family: Noctuidae
- Genus: Spodoptera
- Species: S. pectinicornis

Binomial name
- Spodoptera pectinicornis Hampson, 1895

Synonyms
- Xanthoptera pectinicornis; Caradrina hennia

= Spodoptera pectinicornis =

Waterlettuce moth

Species of moth

Spodoptera pectinicornis (waterlettuce moth) is a moth of the family Noctuidae native to Asia, where it can be found from the northeastern parts of the Himalaya to Sundaland and in New Guinea. It has been introduced as a biocontrol agent of waterlettuce in Florida in 1990, but the attempt was unsuccessful.

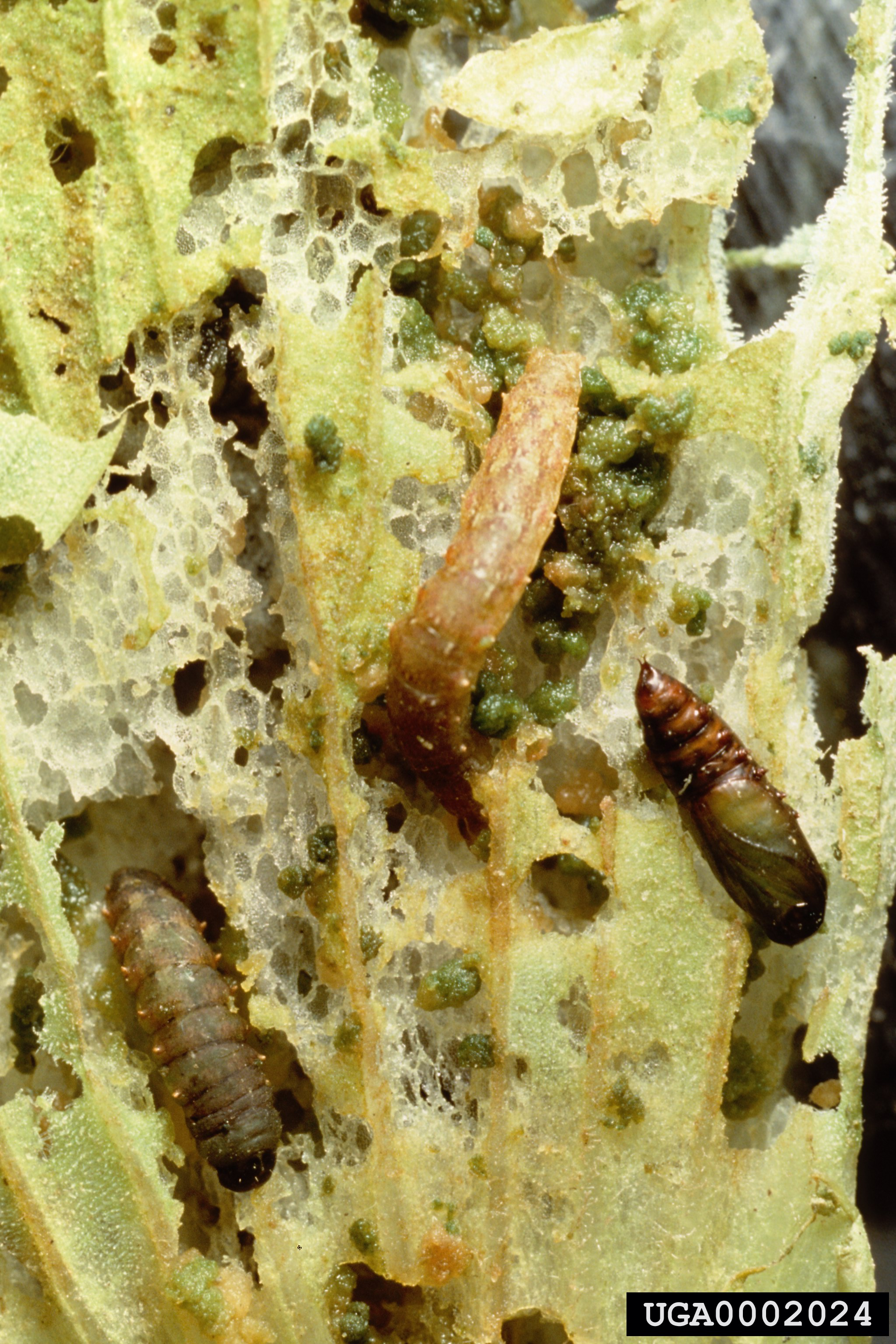
Caterpillar

The larvae feed on Pistia stratiotes and Eichhornia crassipes.
