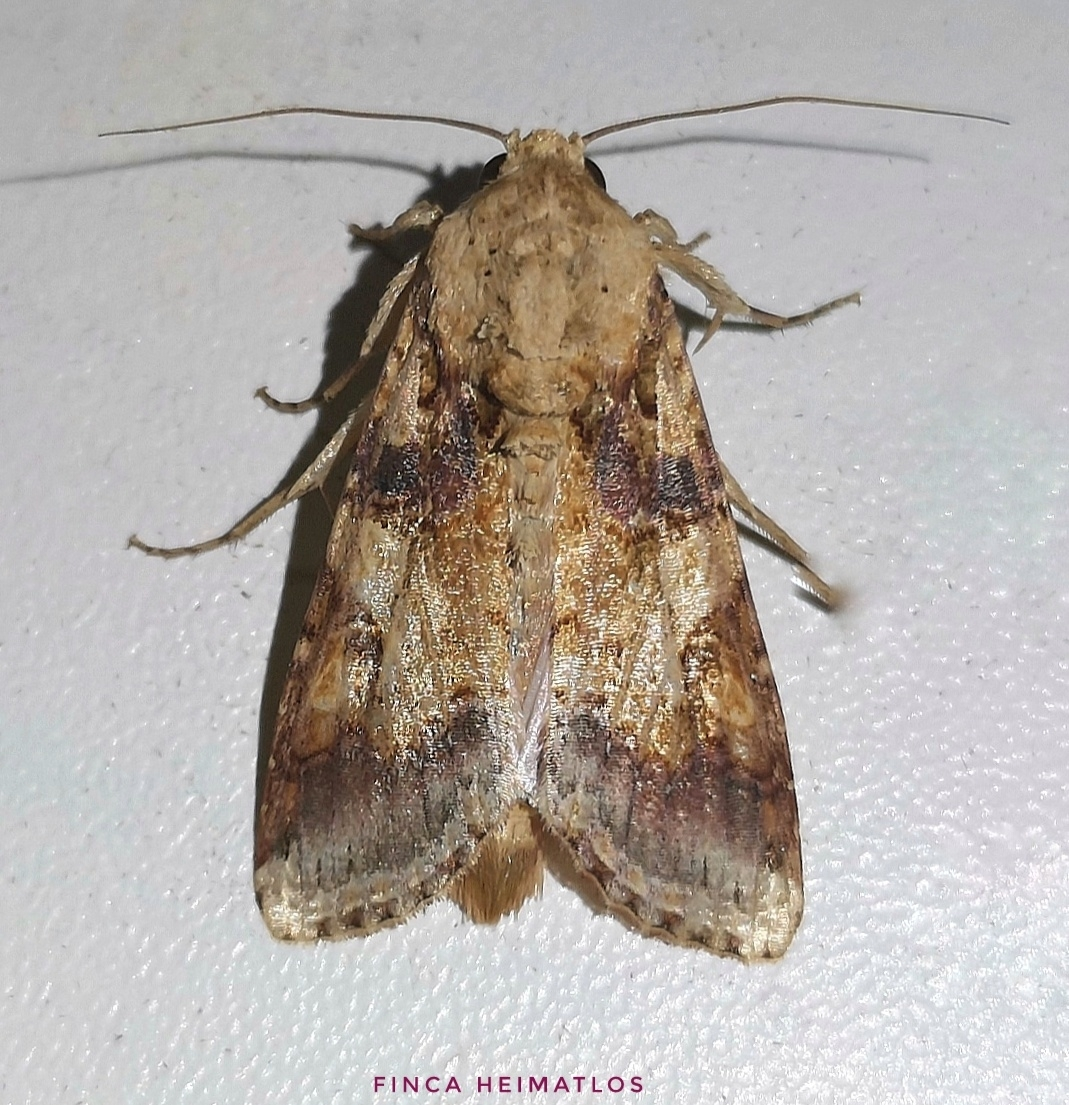

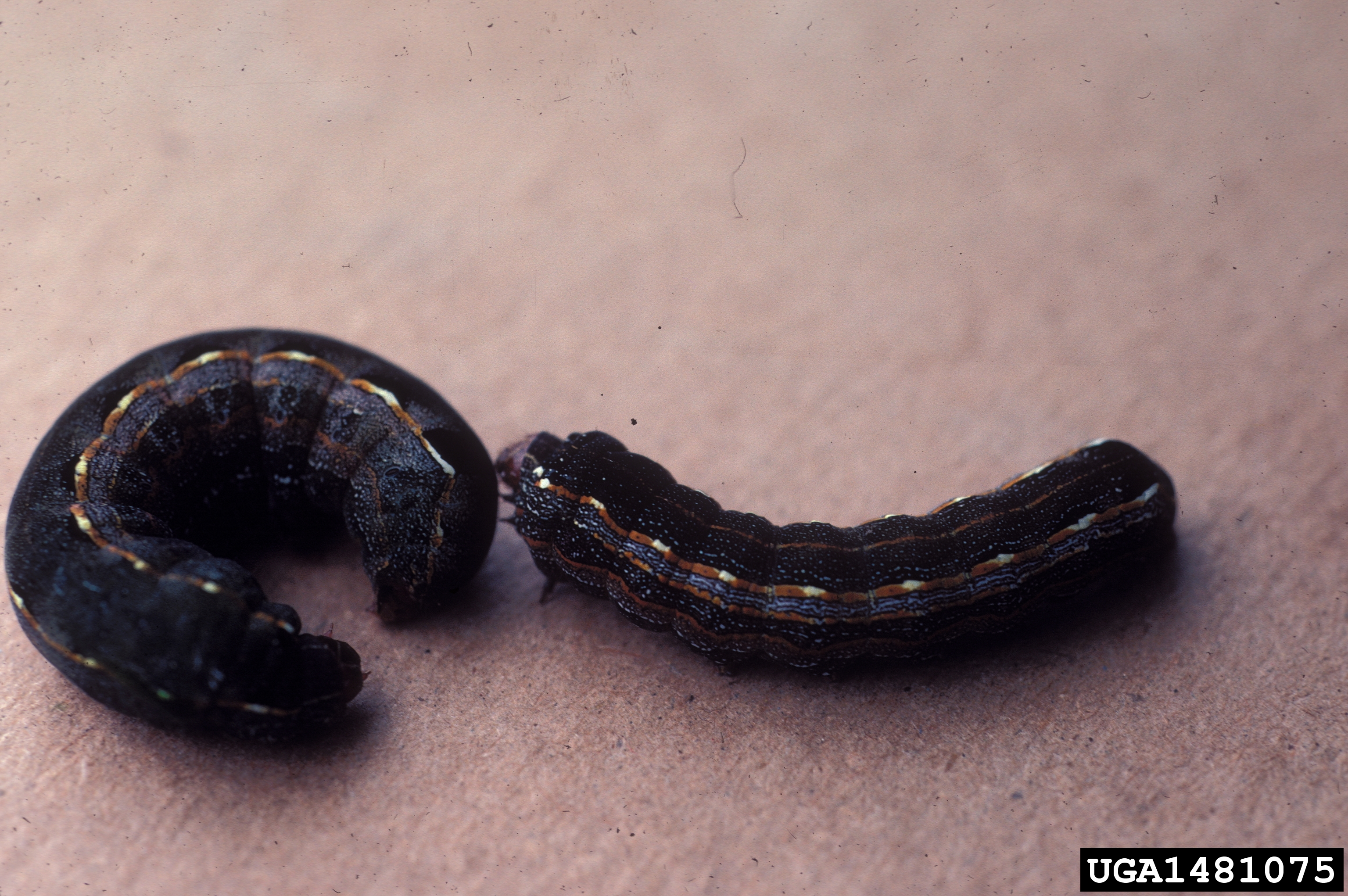
- Caterpillar

Scientific classification
- Kingdom: Animalia
- Phylum: Arthropoda
- Class: Insecta
- Order: Lepidoptera
- Superfamily: Noctuoidea
- Family: Noctuidae
- Genus: Spodoptera
- Species: S. latifascia

Binomial name
- Spodoptera latifascia Walker, 1856

Synonyms
- Prodenia variolosa Walker, 1857

= Spodoptera latifascia =

Species of moth

Spodoptera latifascia, commonly known as the lateral-lined armyworm, garden armyworm, or velvet armyworm, is a moth of the family Noctuidae found from Central America and the Antilles into North America (from Texas to Florida).

== Description ==
The wingspan is about 42 mm.

== Phenology ==
Adults are on wing from March to October depending on the location.

== Geography ==
Type Locality: Jamaica

== Taxonomy ==
Walker (1856) originally described latifascia, placing it in the genus Prodenia.

Basionym: Prodenia latifascia Walker, 1856.

Pogue (2002) revived S. cosmioides (Walker, 1858), as a valid species (though mis-spelled as S. cosmiodes), from synonymy of S. latifascia.
