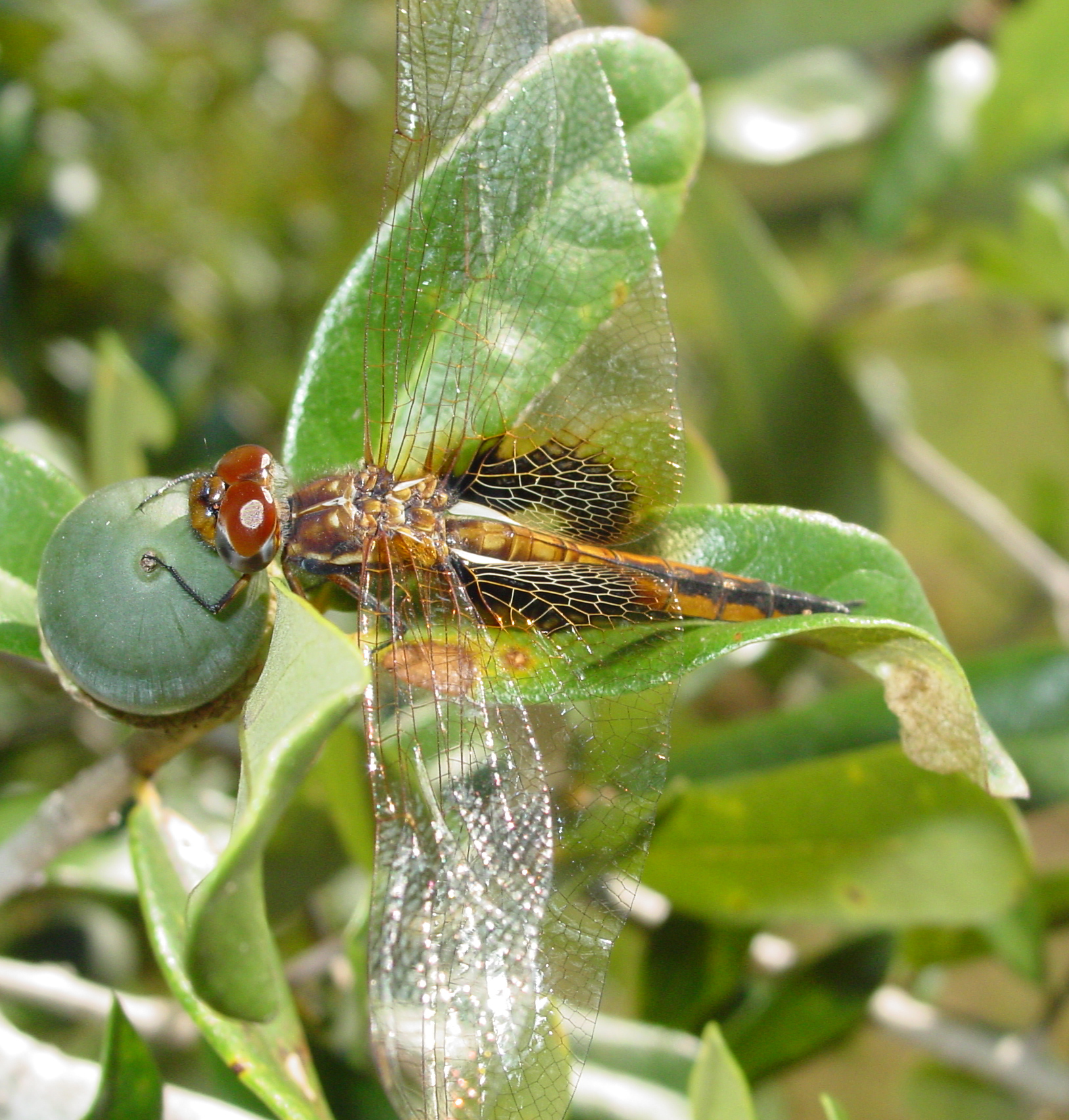

Conservation status
- Least Concern (IUCN 3.1)

Scientific classification
- Kingdom: Animalia
- Phylum: Arthropoda
- Class: Insecta
- Order: Odonata
- Infraorder: Anisoptera
- Family: Libellulidae
- Genus: Miathyria
- Species: M. marcella

Binomial name
- Miathyria marcella (Selys in Sagra, 1857)

= Miathyria marcella =

Species of dragonfly

Miathyria marcella, the hyacinth glider, is a species of skimmer in the dragonfly family Libellulidae. It is found in the Caribbean Sea, Central America, North America, and South America.

The IUCN conservation status of Miathyria marcella is "LC", least concern, with no immediate threat to the species' survival. The population is stable. The IUCN status was reviewed in 2017.
