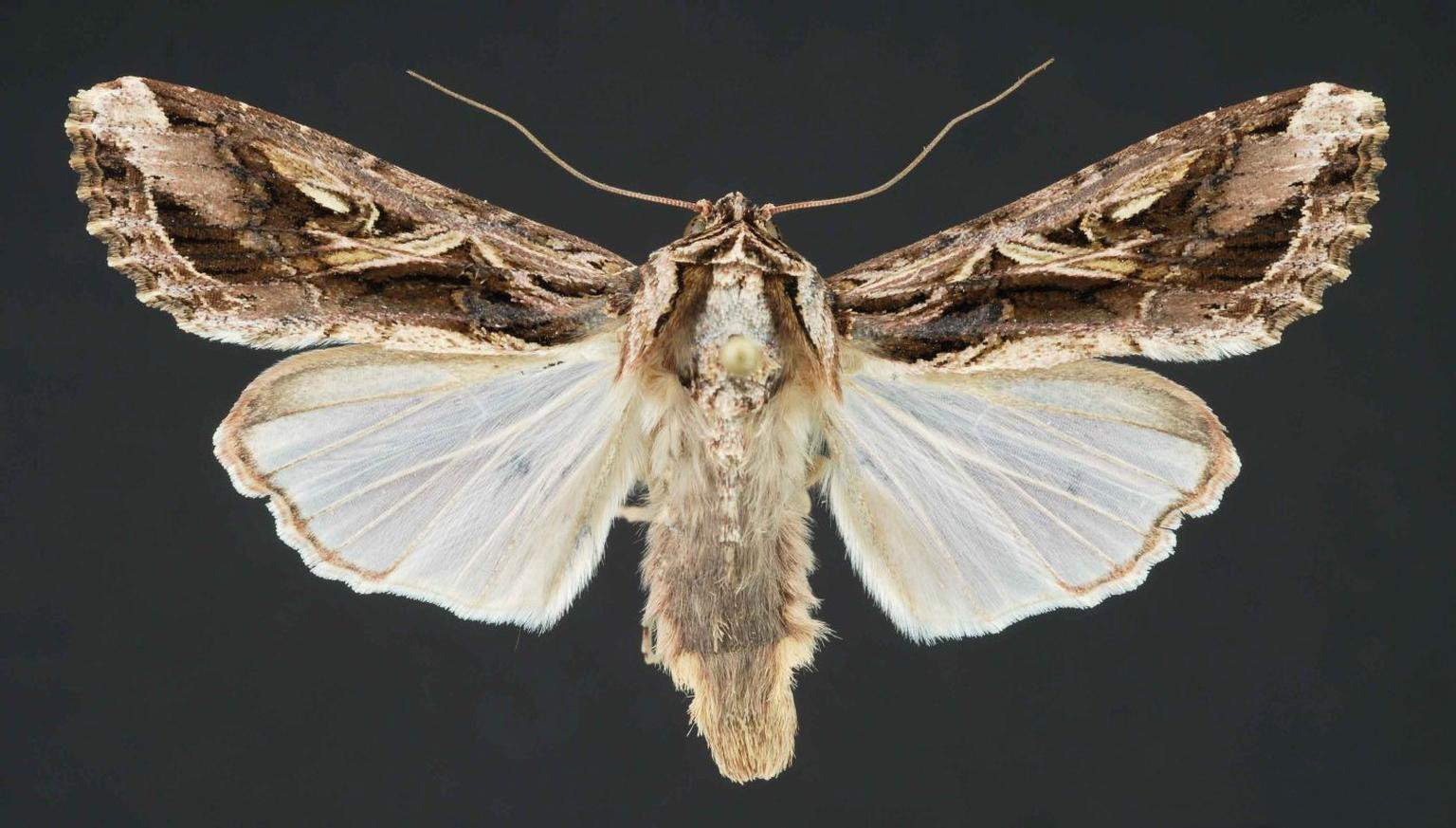

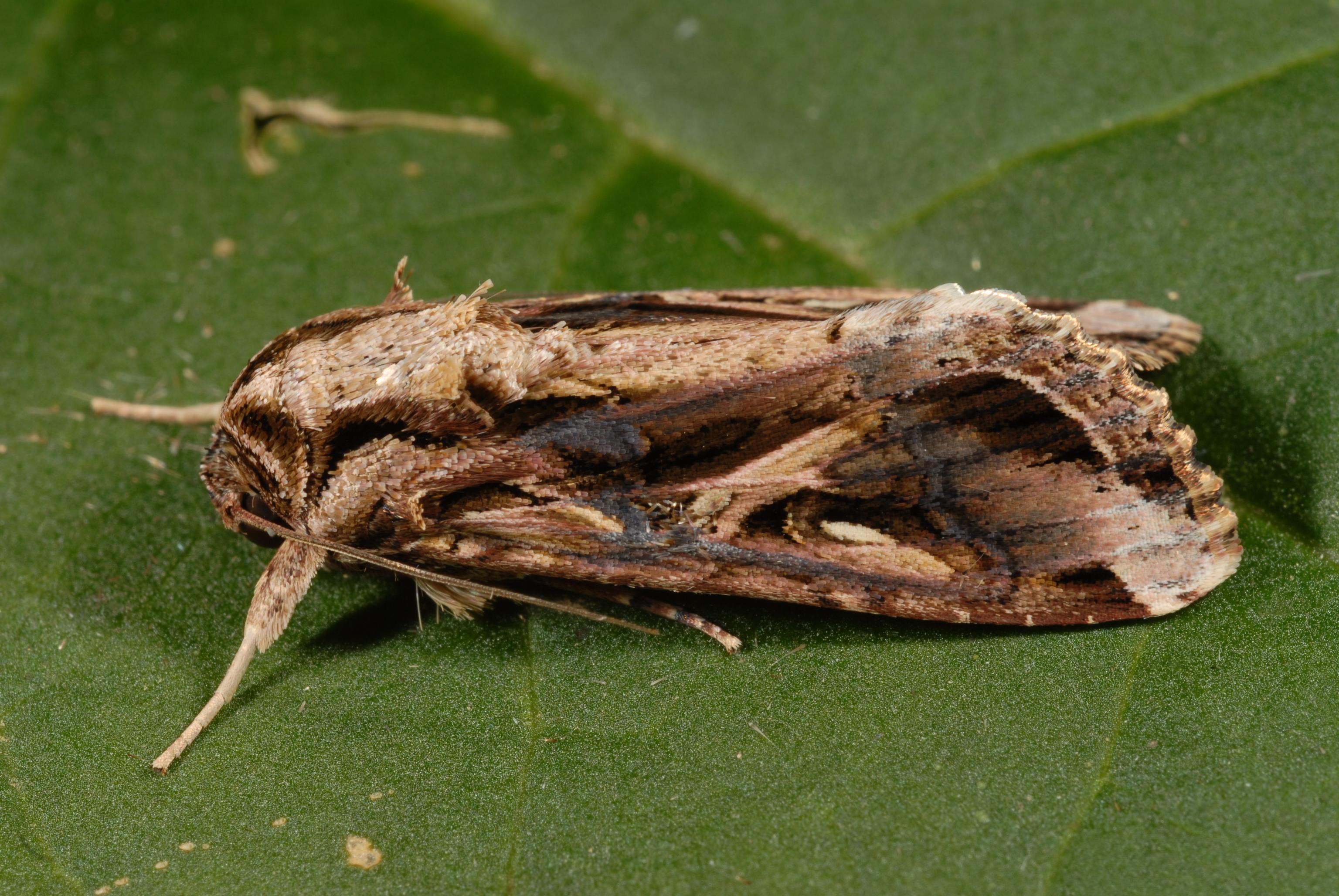

Scientific classification
- Kingdom: Animalia
- Phylum: Arthropoda
- Class: Insecta
- Order: Lepidoptera
- Superfamily: Noctuoidea
- Family: Noctuidae
- Genus: Spodoptera
- Species: S. dolichos

Binomial name
- Spodoptera dolichos (Fabricius, 1794)

Synonyms
- Noctua dolichos Fabricius, 1794; Prodenia dolichos; Phalaena commelinae Smith, 1797; Prodenia commelinae; Phalaena marmorea Sepp, [1840]

= Spodoptera dolichos =

Species of moth

Spodoptera dolichos, the dolichos armyworm moth or sweetpotato armyworm moth, is a moth of the family Noctuidae. The species was first described by Johan Christian Fabricius in 1794. It is found from the southern United States (including Alabama, Florida, Georgia, Louisiana, Mississippi, South Carolina, and Texas), south through Costa Rica to South America, as far south as Argentina. In the United States, it may occur as far north as Kentucky and Maryland.

The wingspan is about 40 millimetres (1 5/8 in).

The larvae are polyphagous and feed on a wide range of wild and cultivated plants
