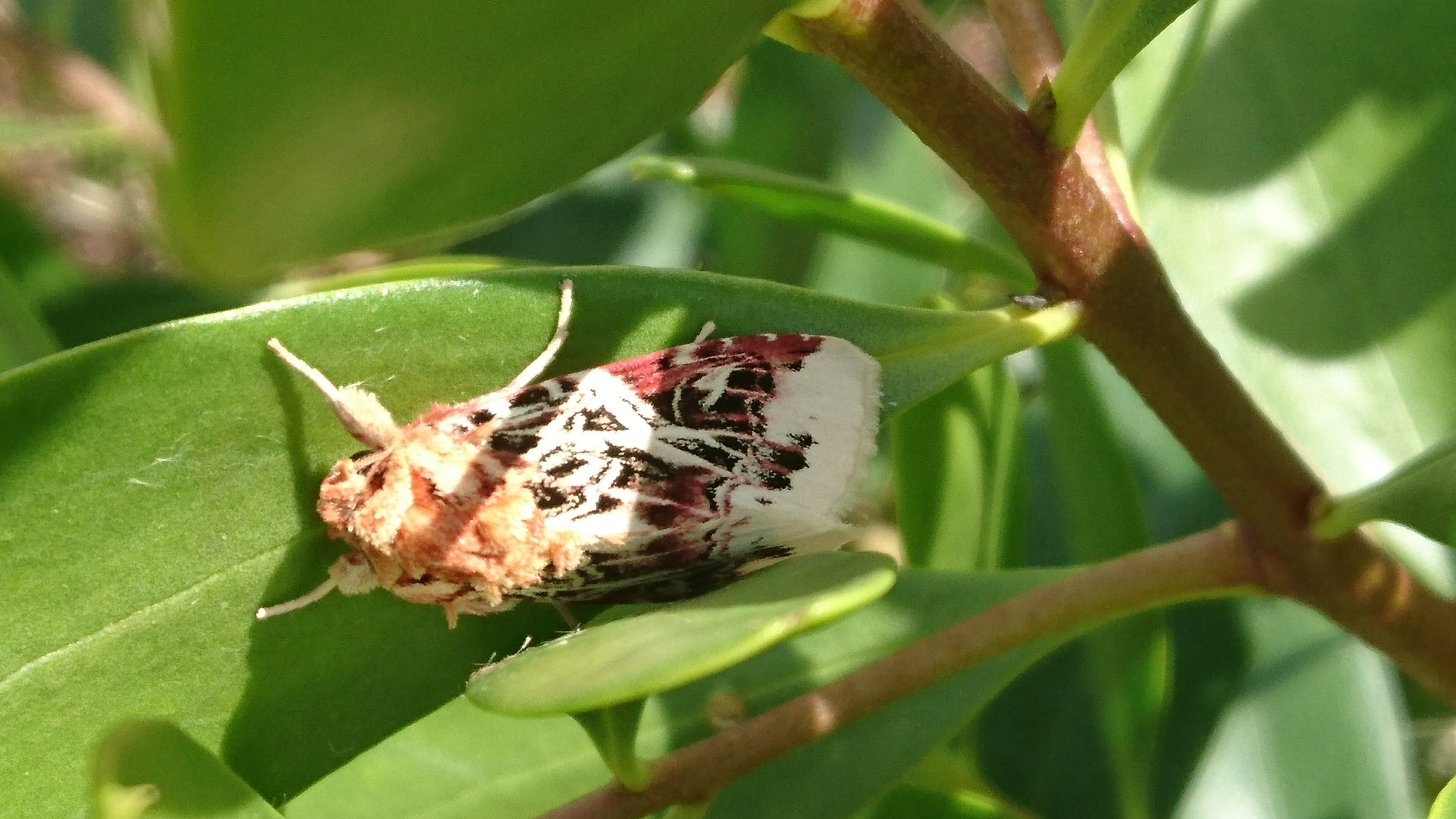
- Adult moth

Scientific classification
- Kingdom: Animalia
- Phylum: Arthropoda
- Clade: Pancrustacea
- Class: Insecta
- Order: Lepidoptera
- Superfamily: Noctuoidea
- Family: Noctuidae
- Genus: Spodoptera
- Species: S. picta

Binomial name
- Spodoptera picta (Guérin-Méneville, 1838)

Synonyms
- Noctua picta Guérin-Méneville, [1838]; Calogramma picta; Phalaena festiva Donovan, 1805 (preocc. Phalaena festiva Cramer, 1775); Polia picta Boisduval, 1832 (repl., preocc. Noctua picta Guérin-Méneville, [1831])

= Spodoptera picta =

Lily caterpillar

Species of moth

Spodoptera picta, the lily caterpillar, is a moth of the family Noctuidae. It was described by Félix Édouard Guérin-Méneville in 1838. It is found from India, South-east Asia and Japan through Indonesia, Australia and the western part of South Pacific ocean to Fiji. Its caterpillars feeds on the leaves of plants in the Amaryllidaceae and Liliaceae families, and can be a significant pest in gardens.

== Description ==
The wingspan is about 40 mm. It is generally an ochreous-white moth, the head and thorax suffused with pinkish red. The forewings have some red on their costal base; there are numerous ill-defined waved black lines present between the base and antemedial line: the orbicular and claviform consisting of black rings; a medial pinkish red band, wide at costa narrowing to inner margin; the reniform with ochreous and black outlines and red centre; the postmedial double waved lines are filled in with ochreous and highly excurved beyond the cell; some black dashes can be seen on reddish patches beyond it. The hindwings are semi-hyaline white.

Caterpillars have smooth skin and are pale grey with a series of longitudinal black lines. Mesothorax also has dark patches with last abdominal segment. With development, central dorsal line become yellowish.

== Ecology ==
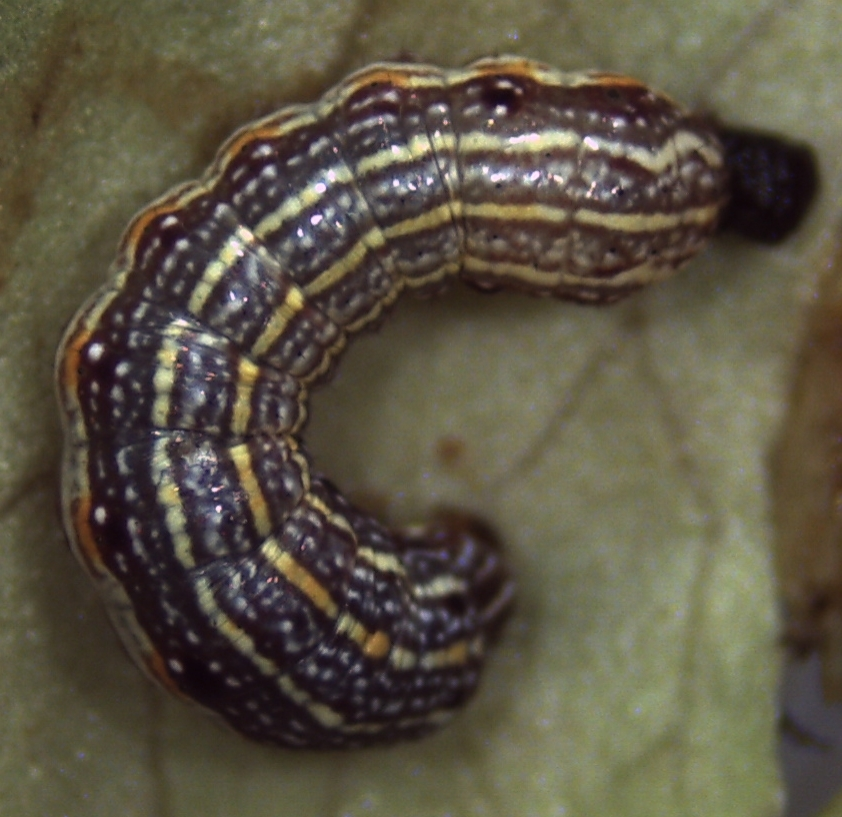
Larval stage

Eggs are laid on the leaves of host plants. The caterpillars bore into the leaves and down into the crown of the bulb. The caterpillar pupates in leaf litter. Pupation takes place under ground in an earthen cocoon.
