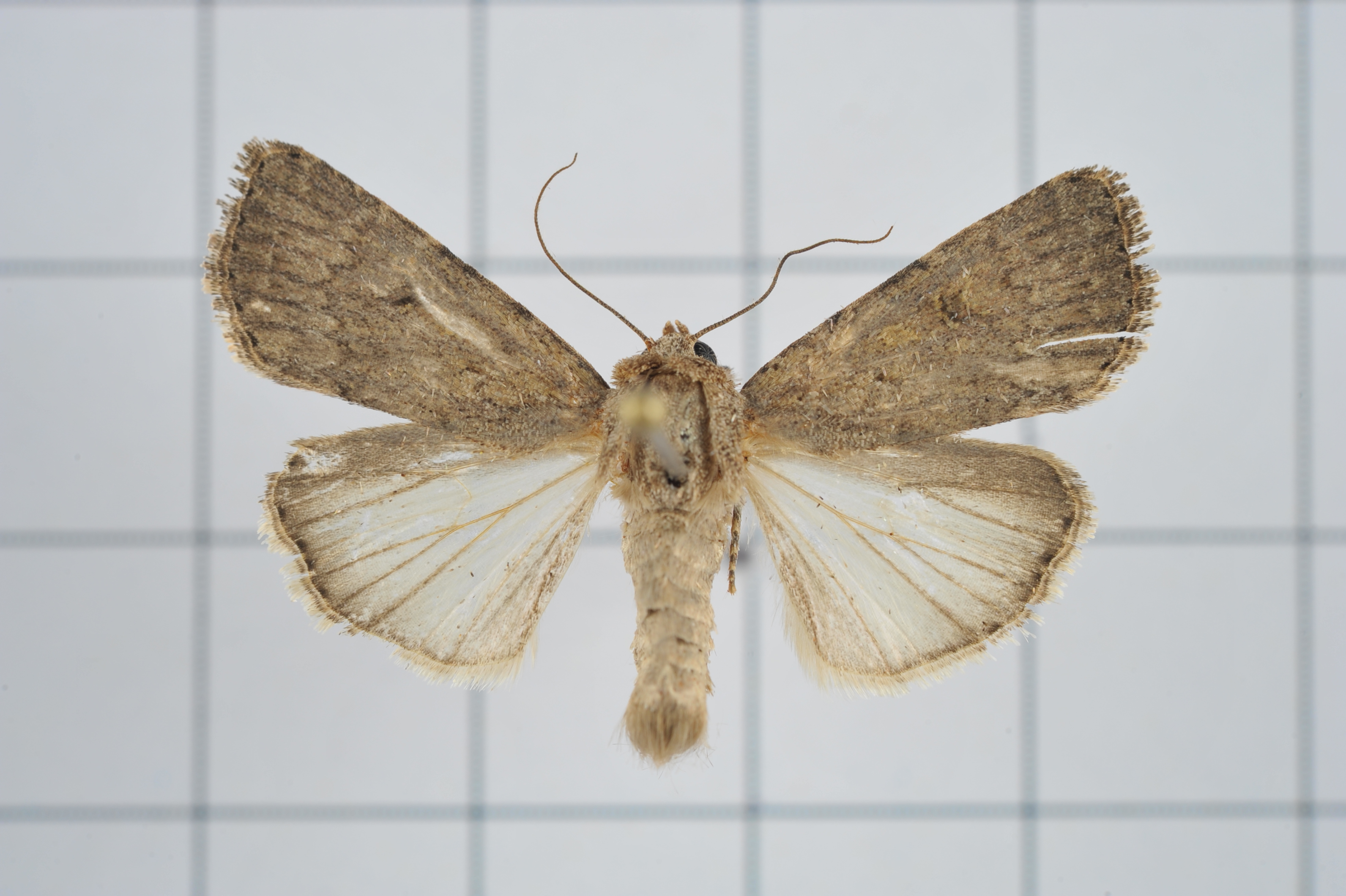

Scientific classification
- Kingdom: Animalia
- Phylum: Arthropoda
- Clade: Pancrustacea
- Class: Insecta
- Order: Lepidoptera
- Superfamily: Noctuoidea
- Family: Noctuidae
- Genus: Spodoptera
- Species: S. pecten

Binomial name
- Spodoptera pecten Guenee, 1852

= Spodoptera pecten =

Species of moth

Spodoptera pecten is a moth of the family Noctuidae found from the Indo-Australian tropics to New Guinea. It has also been recorded from Japan and Hawaii.

The larvae feed on various grasses, but have also been recorded feeding on the seeds of Shorea curtisii.

== See also ==
- African armyworm (Spodoptera exempta)
