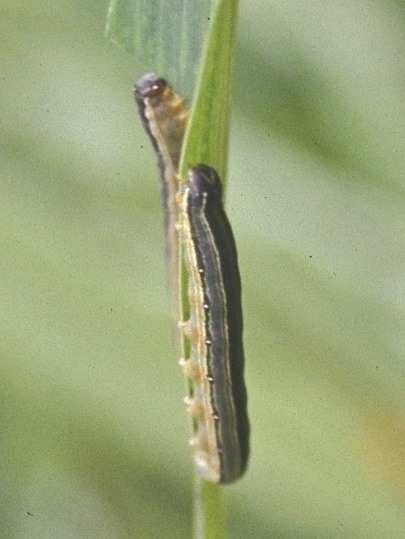

Scientific classification
- Kingdom: Animalia
- Phylum: Arthropoda
- Clade: Pancrustacea
- Class: Insecta
- Order: Lepidoptera
- Superfamily: Noctuoidea
- Family: Noctuidae
- Genus: Spodoptera
- Species: S. exempta

Binomial name
- Spodoptera exempta (Walker, 1856)

Synonyms
- Agrotis exempta Walker, 1856; Prodenia bipars Walker, 1857; Prodenia ingloria Walker, 1858; Laphygma exempta

= African armyworm =

Species of moth

The African armyworm (Spodoptera exempta), also called okalombo, kommandowurm, or nutgrass armyworm, is a species of moth of the family Noctuidae. The larvae often exhibit marching behavior when traveling to feeding sites, leading to the common name "armyworm". The caterpillars exhibit density-dependent polyphenism where larvae raised in isolation are green, while those raised in groups are black. These phases are termed solitaria and gregaria, respectively. Gregaria caterpillars are considered very deleterious pests, capable of destroying entire crops in a matter of weeks. The larvae feed on all types of grasses, early stages of cereal crops (e.g., corn, rice, wheat, millet, sorghum), sugarcane, and occasionally on coconut. The solitaria caterpillars are less active and undergo much slower development. The species is commonly found in Africa, but can also be seen in Yemen, some Pacific islands, and parts of Australia. African armyworm outbreaks tend to be devastating for farmland and pasture in these areas, with the highest-density outbreaks occurring during the rainy season after periods of prolonged drought. During the long dry seasons ("off-season"), the population densities are very low and no outbreaks are seen.

== Taxonomy and phylogeny ==
Spodoptera exempta was first described by Francis Walker in 1856. The species of Spodoptera are distributed around the world, mostly inhabiting tropical and subtropical areas. There are 30 known species in the genus, and roughly half are considered agricultural pests. There are two final larval stages based on the mandible structure of the species: serrate-like mandibles and chisel-like mandibles. Along with S. exempta, the following species and subspecies have chisel-like mandibles that were evolved to consume silica-rich leaves: S. triturata, S. m. mauritia, S. m. acronyctoides, S. umbraculata, S. cilium, Spodoptera depravata, and S. pecten. Like S. exempta, a few species are migratory as adults and travel downwind for hundreds of kilometers, namely S. exigua, S. frugiperda, and S. litura. Due to the broad distribution of the species, the origin of the genus is unknown. However, dating of phylogenic trees reveal that the common ancestor for the genus lived between 22 and 30.7 million years ago and began diversification during the Miocene Epoch.

== Geographic range ==
The African armyworm is commonly found in the grasslands of Africa and Asia. Within Africa, it is mostly seen near the Sahara in the following countries: Tanzania, Kenya, Uganda, Ethiopia, Somalia, Malawi, Zimbabwe, Zambia, and South Africa. Outside of Africa, the species also inhabits southwest Saudi Arabia, Southeast Asia, Australia, and New Zealand.

== Habitat ==
Akin to other species of the genus Spodoptera, S. exempta lives in tropical and subtropical environments near cereal crops and dense vegetation where the larvae of the species can easily feed. Because these larvae thrive in high-density populations, African armyworm outbreaks occur in which fields become overrun by caterpillars. The surrounding vegetation is then consumed in large amounts, often with devastating effects. While seasonal winds and rains allow adult S. exempta to migrate across countries and continents, they are often confined to coastal areas and marshes during dry seasons, where the occasional rainfall supports enough vegetation growth for the moth's survival.

== Food resources ==
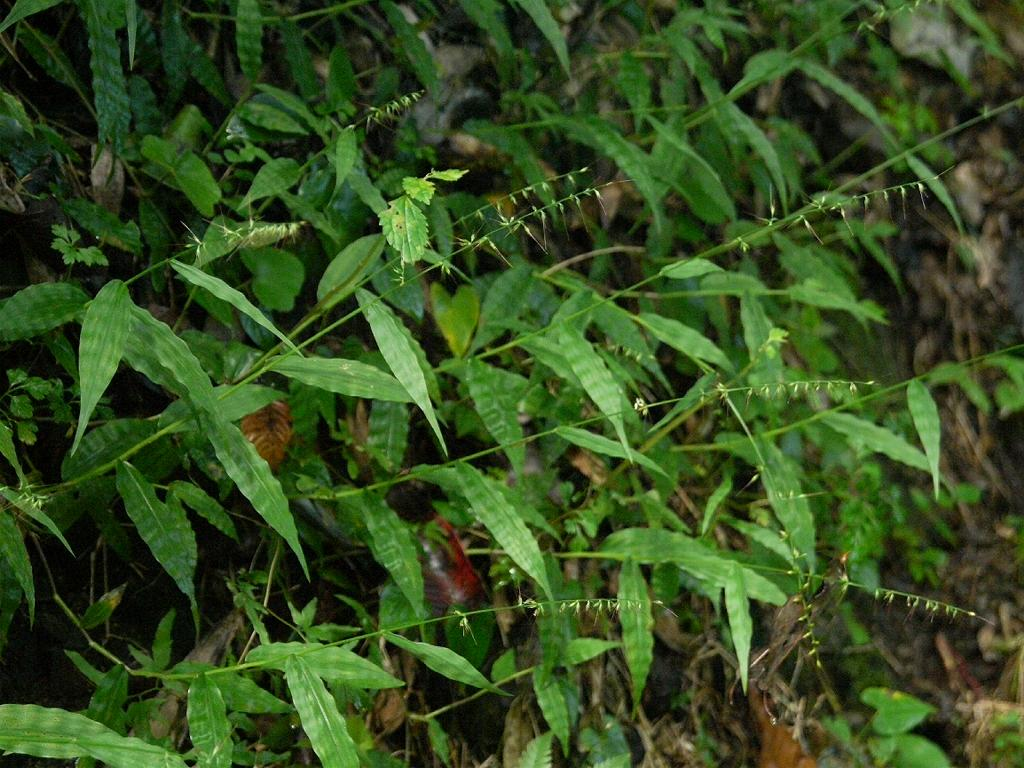
Oplismenus undulatifolius, a type of Poaceae

S. exempta larvae feed almost exclusively on Poaceae, also called Gramineae. Poaceae is a family of flowering grasses which includes cereal grasses and the grasses of grasslands and pastures. The species targets most cereal crops, including maize, sorghum, rice, millet, and other grasses. Young caterpillars are also known to feed on wheat and oat seedlings. The larvae eat the upper and lower surfaces of the plant tissue first, preferring to feed on younger and recently germinated crops. Studies have shown that two larvae can completely consume a 10-day-old maize plant with 6–7 leaves, indicating the devastating potential of a high-density outbreak.

== Life cycle ==
=== Eggs ===
The female can lay a maximum of about 1,000 eggs in her lifetime. She can lay 100–400 eggs per night, with an overall average of 150. The number of eggs females can lay is positively correlated with their pupal weight. African armyworms primarily lay their eggs in clusters on the lower side of leaves. Their eggs are relatively small at 0.5 mm in diameter. They are white when first laid, but will turn black prior to hatching. The eggs hatch into larvae within two to five days.

=== Larvae ===
S. exempta undergo six larval instars that altogether can last between 14 and 22 days depending on the temperature and vegetation in the environment. Fully grown sixth-instar larvae are 25–33 mm long.

The larvae display density-dependent polyphenism where the appearance of the individual depends on the population density in which it was reared. The terms gregaria and solitaria were given to the caterpillars raised in groups and in solitude, respectively. These two phases can also be referred to as gregarious and solitary or crowded and isolated. Gregaria larvae have black bodies and thin yellow, horizontal stripes along their bodies. Solitaria larvae have green coloration with a brown stripe down their backs. This green coloration is due to both pigmentation and ingested plant material visible in the gut. The differences in appearance between the solitaria and gregaria phases become apparent in the third instar and remain until the last instar. The species is most damaging to crops during its gregaria phase because the black-bodied caterpillars are more active and densely concentrated than solitaria caterpillars. Solitaria larvae are less active and tend to stay curled up by the base of the crops, leading to less exposure to the sun. Because gregaria caterpillars have darker coloration and maintain positions higher up on the crops, they have increased exposure to the sun, resulting in more rapid development than solitaria caterpillars. Generally, African armyworms are not noticed by farmers until the caterpillars are ten days old and start exhibiting the gregaria phase.

Larvae that are transferred from isolated to dense conditions or vice versa display the gregaria appearance. The darkness of the gregaria phase is positively correlated with the population density of the environment; two larvae raised together will have a dark brown appearance, while larvae raised in larger groups will be completely black. The caterpillar's phase is determined by non-species specific larval interaction but can be influenced by temperature. Isolated larvae that are raised in low temperatures can gain a darker appearance, while larvae raised in crowded groups at high temperatures will not be as dark as typical gregaria. Despite how sensitive the developing larvae are to larval contact, high densities of solitaria caterpillars have been recorded due to a vegetation-dense environment limiting interaction. Because the developmental and pupal stages for gregaria caterpillars are shorter than the solitaria caterpillars, gregaria-phase larvae tend to be smaller but have more efficient feeding behavior.

=== Pupae ===
Pupation occurs beneath the surface of host plants and away from bare ground, roughly 2–3 cm underground. This pupation event leads to a sudden synchronized disappearance of the larvae, especially if the soil is moist.

=== Adults ===
Adults emerge in 7 to 10 days and can live up to 14 days. The moths migrate over hundreds of kilometers from their emergence sites to their oviposition sites. This migration often causes outbreaks to occur suddenly in areas that were previously free of the pests. While polyphenism is observed in the larvae, the two phases lead to indistinguishable S. exempta adults. However, the two larval phases go on to display different migratory behavior. The gregaria larvae tend to produce adults that travel longer and further during the migration period.

The adult moth wingspan is between 20 and 37 mm, with dull gray-brown forewings and off-white hindwings with visible veins. Females and males can be distinguished by the number of bristles on their frenulum, where males have a single bristle while females have multiple. Females are also identifiable due to their racquet-shaped abdomen tip and black scales. Males have been observed to mature earlier than females.

== Migrations ==
When African armyworms first emerge after pupation, they allow their bodies to dry off and their wings to harden before climbing trees. The moths then fly hundreds of meters above the ground and rely on winds to carry them to their next location. Therefore, migration is based on winds brought by the Intertropical Convergence Zone, which move northwards or southwards depending on the season. The moths only travel during the day and descend during dusk to hide in the grass until dawn. This process is repeated for several days until an acceptable destination is reached or the moths encounter rain. Because rain causes the moths to descend, S. exempta are less likely to migrate during frequent rainfall. After the moths land back on the ground, they drink water, mate, and lay their eggs. Migration is beneficial because it allows the species to travel to a new location with fewer predators and less possibility of parasitism and infection.

== Outbreak behavior ==
S. exempta are a serious pest for crops, often thriving during the wet seasons and leading to outbreaks. There are two types of African armyworm outbreaks: primary and secondary. Primary outbreaks occur with relatively inconspicuous, low-density populations that can survive without frequent rainfall. Secondary outbreaks occur when the moths from the primary outbreak are carried downwind and the adults mate and lay eggs in same location due to wind patterns. During these secondary outbreaks, gregaria larvae emerge from the ground synchronously, and their density may exceed 1,000 larvae per m^{2}. These larvae display highly active feeding behavior, leading to excessive consumption of the nearby vegetation, especially the leaves of cereal crops and grasses. If extremely hungry, the gregaria larvae may also consume the stem and flowers of the plants. The high-density gregaria larvae may then pupate and emerge as adults, leading to a large migration event of moths that travel downwind together. These moths will then develop their eggs together, resulting in more outbreaks. The intensity of outbreaks also increases during the start of the wet season after a drought, which allows moths to lay eggs in areas of dense vegetation which supports the larval stage growth.

== Enemies ==
=== Overview ===
Natural enemies have limited effects on African armyworms due to the species' unpredictable migration paths and variable population densities. The large number of moths traveling during migration can also lead to predator swamping, overwhelming the predator by exceeding its capacity to eat the moths. Despite these challenges, S. exempta still faces predators, parasites, parasitoids, diseases, and viruses. During the pupal and pre-pupal stages, the species is susceptible to a cytoplasmic virus. High humidity and temperature lead to attacks from the fungi Nomuraea rileyi. Although parasitoids do not accumulate rapidly enough to kill a S. exempta population before migration occurs, if the moths happen to return to the same spot, high levels of parasitism are experienced. Most significantly, the species is infected by the species-specific baculovirus, S. exempta nucleopolyhedrovirus (SpexNPV).

=== SpexNPV ===
SpexNPV, abbreviated from S. exempta nucleopolyhedrovirus, is a baculovirus that can be transmitted vertically, from adults to offspring. SpexNPV can kill 90% of an African armyworm larvae population in their last instar; the high mortality rate is due to the vertically transmitted diseases' capability of traveling with the diseased individual during migration. Because vertically transmitted diseases benefit from the host species' survival and are less pathogenic than horizontally transmitted diseases, SpexNPV can persist in an individual with no symptoms. S. exempta attempt to reduce the risk of contracting SpexNPV via density-dependent prophylaxis, which allows the species to invest more in resisting disease and stimulate migration to less dense locations.

=== Possible pathogen ===
In 2026 it was observed that a local isolate of a fungus, Metarhizium rileyi, naturally infects and kills the larval instars of the African armyworm. It was observed in some areas that dead African armyworm larvae were covering large areas of fields, some on the soil surface but most attached to blades of grass. The infection manifested as white and green conidia (asexual spores) on the insects' cuticle surface. The fungus had previously been reported to be an effective biological control agent of the fall armyworm in countries such as the Philippines, but this was the first observation and report of its efficacy against the African armyworm. It was suggested as an additional management strategy for use during outbreak seasons of the insect, with commercial production of the fungus as a possible next step.

== Mating ==
=== Female/male interactions ===
==== Pheromones ====
Virgin female S. exempta adults are observed to release pheromones that attract males. In particular, this includes the following six compounds: Z9-14:Ac (Z-9-tetradecenyl acetate), Z,E9,12-14:Ac ((Z,E)-9,12-tetradecadienyl acetate), Z11-14:Ac (Z-11-tetradecenyl acetate), Z9-14:OH (Z-9-tetradecen-1-ol), Z9-14:Ald (Z-9-tetradecenal), and Z11-16:Ac (Z-11-hexadecenyl acetate). While the compounds Z9-14:Ac, Z,E9,12-14:Ac, Z11-14:Ac and Z9-14:OH are commonly found sex pheromones in Lepidoptera species, the latter two compounds have only been seen in other Spodoptera species.

== Physiology ==
=== Thermoregulation ===
While dark coloration in species usually indicates a thermoregulatory function, this does not appear to be true under normal conditions in S. exempta. The black gregaria larvae do not exhibit basking behavior which is usually present in dark-colored species that want to increase their body temperature via exposure to the sun. Although the gregaria larvae are shown to heat up more rapidly than the solitaria larvae, gregaria caterpillars have less body mass, which is the main contributing factor to the increased effect of temperature. However, darker coloration was favored in high temperatures when the species is more likely to overheat, suggesting that the coloration between the two phases could be more significant at extreme temperatures.

== Interactions with humans ==
=== Pest control ===
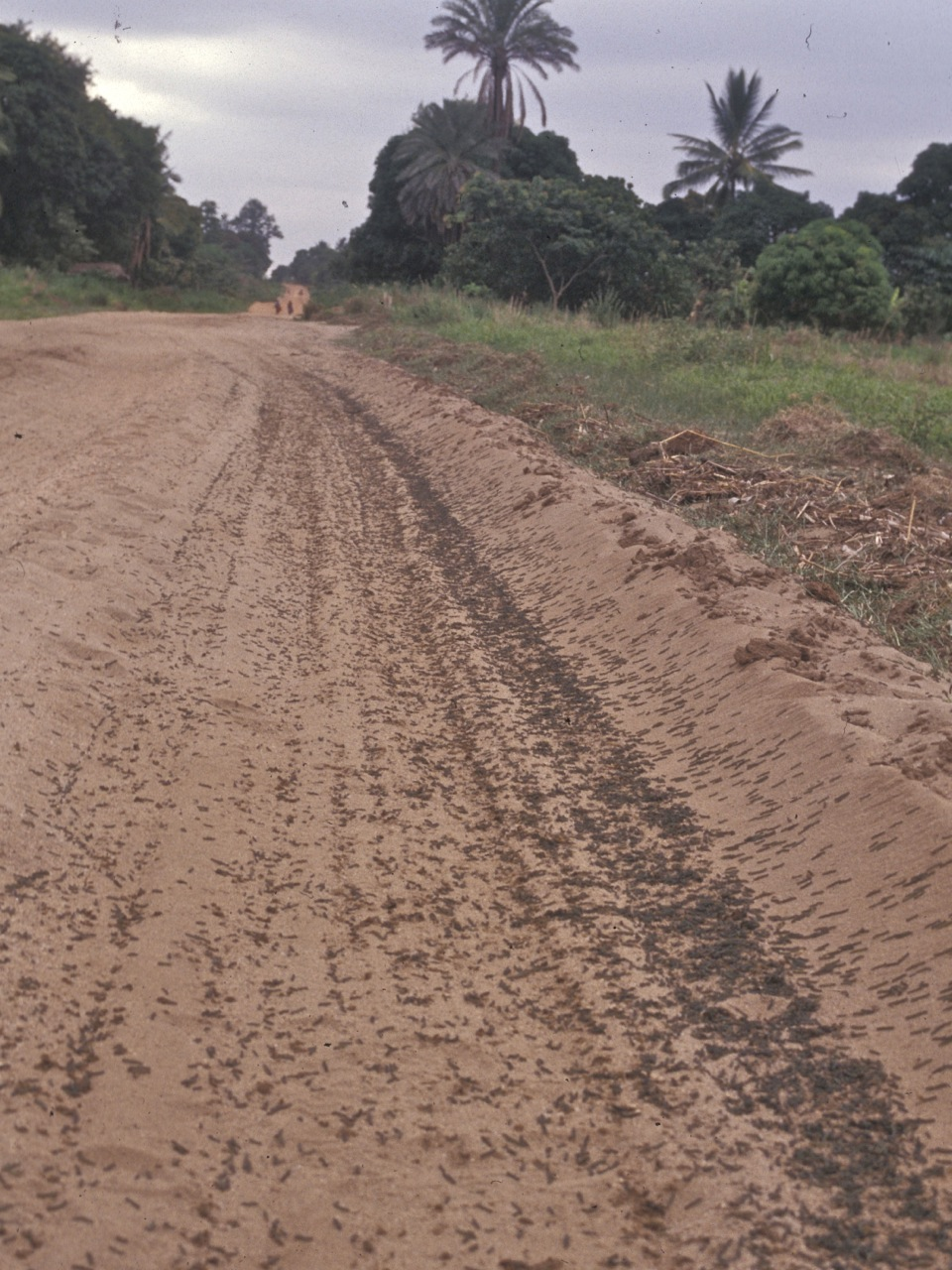
Armyworms marching

The gregaria phase of the S. exempta species are considered agricultural pests due to their high densities and feeding behavior. Because it is hard to identify and eliminate all primary outbreaks, the main focus for pest control has been to target secondary outbreaks. In the past, cheap, broad-use pesticides such as DDT, BHC, and dieldrin were commonly used to target the caterpillars. Now, newer insecticides such as azadirachtin and aqueous neem (Azadirachta indica) seed extracts are often applied, but these methods are dose dependent and have adverse side effects on both human health and crops. More focused, rapid, and environmentally friendly intervention techniques now exist to limit the spreading of S. exempta. For example, the S. exempta nucleopolyhedrovirus virus (SpexNPV), a naturally present disease that preys on the species, is now being investigated as a method of biological pest control.

=== Infestations ===
In mid-April 1999, an African armyworm infestation started in southern Ethiopia, spreading into the north the following month and into the Jubba Valley of Somalia in early May. Similar outbreaks affected the Rift Valley Province of Kenya and parts of Uganda at the same time. While Ethiopian officials had stocks of pesticides to treat 350,000 hectares of affected land, neither Kenyan nor Ugandan officials had sufficient supplies to combat the insect and no central government was present to respond to the emergency in Somalia.

STAR radio in Liberia reported in January 2009 that Zota District in Bong County had been invaded by African armyworms, which had consumed vegetation, polluted creeks and running water, and were moving toward Guinea and Sierra Leone. On January 28, 2009, the president of Liberia declared a state of emergency to deal with the infestation of army worms in the country.

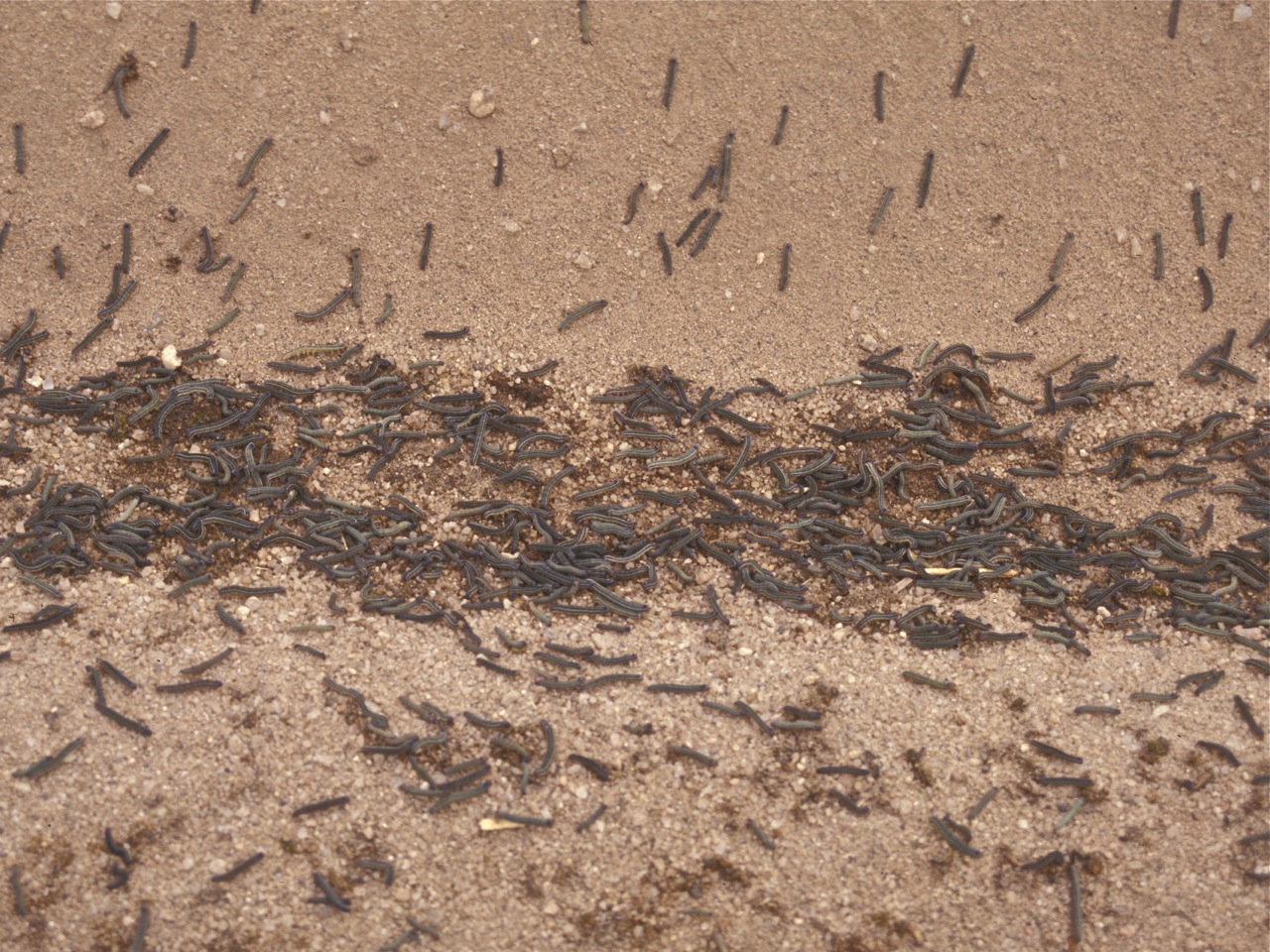
African armyworms marching along a road in Tanzania

December 2009 had an infestation of ten regions of Tanzania. The infested regions include three of the five main grain-producing regions. The other two major grain-producing regions were at risk of infestation. Tanzania has trained farmers in fighting armyworms since 2007, and responded to forecasts of the late 2009 infestation by sending out hundreds of liters of pesticides to rural farmers. The first infestation was reported on December 22 and quickly spread to surrounding regions. The previous growing season saw Tanzania produce 10.872 million tons of grain; after 10.337 million tons of domestic consumption, the remaining 0.534 million tons were exported. By December 31 almost 1,400 acres (5.7 km^{2}) of grain had been destroyed by armyworms in just the Lindi Region of Tanzania.

In January 2015, armyworm outbreaks were reported in Zimbabwe, and by November there were reports of similar outbreaks in Botswana.

In 2016, the fall armyworm (Spodoptera frugiperda, a species of American origin that behaves similarly) invaded maize crops in Zambia. By January 3, 2017, about 90,000 hectares were affected according to reports released by the Zambian government's Disaster Management and Mitigation Unit. The Zambia National Farmers Union indicated that some farms were completely wiped out. The Zambian president directed the air force to help airlift pesticides to fight the outbreak.

In 2017, fall armyworm infestations were detected in more African countries such as Zimbabwe and South Africa.

== See also ==
- Common armyworm or true armyworm (Mythimna unipuncta) (North and South America)
- Fall armyworm (Spodoptera frugiperda) (North and South America)
- Northern armyworm, Oriental armyworm, or rice ear-cutting caterpillar (Mythimna separata) (Asia)
