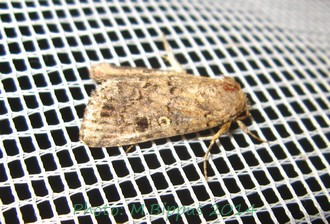

Scientific classification
- Kingdom: Animalia
- Phylum: Arthropoda
- Clade: Pancrustacea
- Class: Insecta
- Order: Lepidoptera
- Superfamily: Noctuoidea
- Family: Noctuidae
- Genus: Spodoptera
- Species: S. cilium

Binomial name
- Spodoptera cilium Guenée, 1852

= Spodoptera cilium =

Species of moth

Spodoptera cilium, known variously as dark mottled willow, lawn caterpillar and grasslawn armyworm, is a noctuid moth found throughout much of sub-Saharan Africa and western, southern, and south-east Asia and several countries in southern and eastern Europe. It is a migrant to northern Europe and has been recorded at least nine times in the United Kingdom.

The larva feeds on Oryza. It is sometimes a pest.

== See also ==
- African armyworm (Spodoptera exempta)
