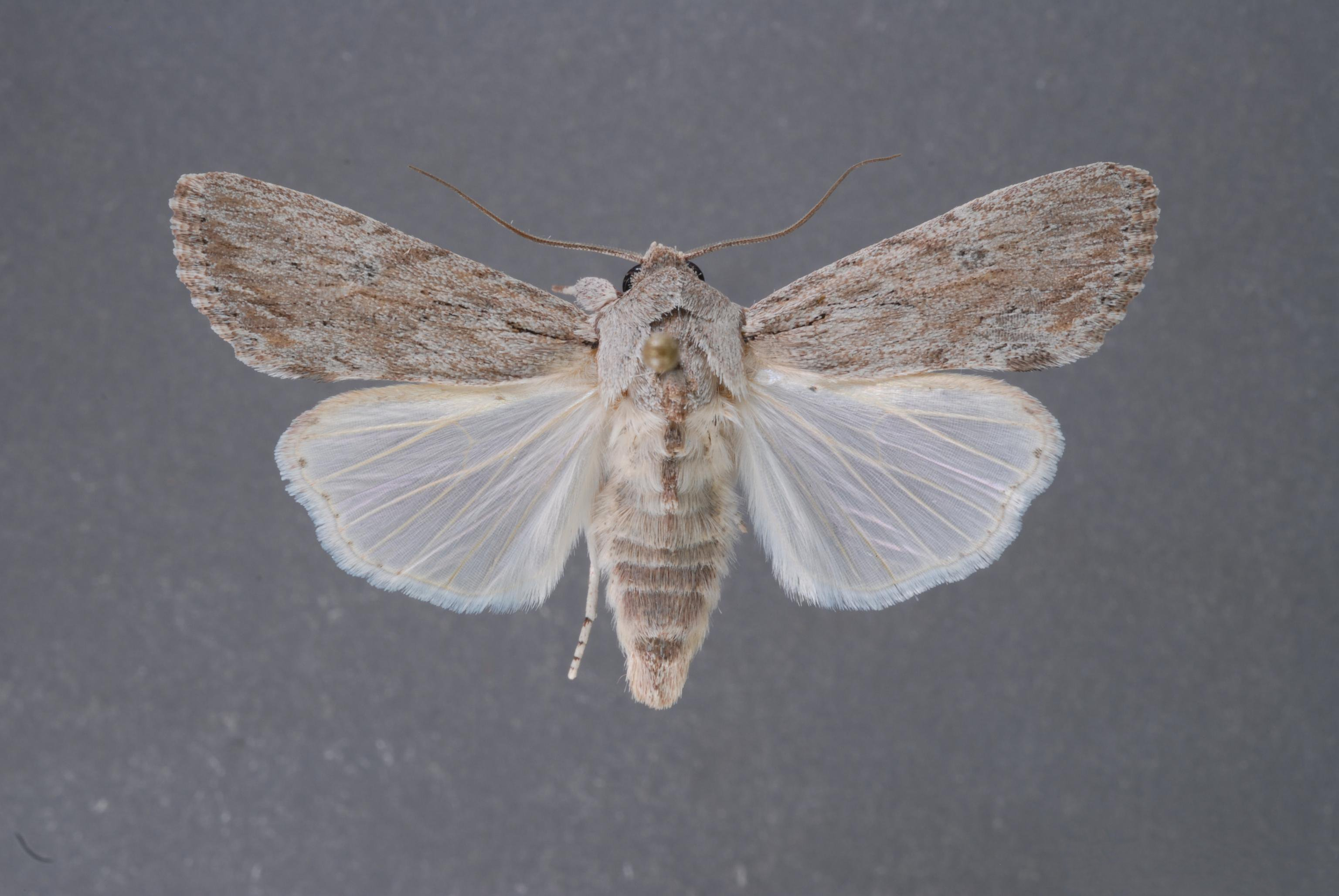

Scientific classification
- Kingdom: Animalia
- Phylum: Arthropoda
- Clade: Pancrustacea
- Class: Insecta
- Order: Lepidoptera
- Superfamily: Noctuoidea
- Family: Noctuidae
- Genus: Spodoptera
- Species: S. albula

Binomial name
- Spodoptera albula (Walker, 1857)

Synonyms
- Xylina albula Walker, 1857; Spodoptera albulum; Laphygma orbicularis Walker, 1857; Laphygma caudata Walker, 1865

= Spodoptera albula =

Species of moth

Spodoptera albula (unbarred spodoptera moth or gray-streaked armyworm moth) is a moth of the family Noctuidae found from the southern United States, south to South America.

The wingspan is 33–35 mm.

The larvae feed on Amaranthus species.
