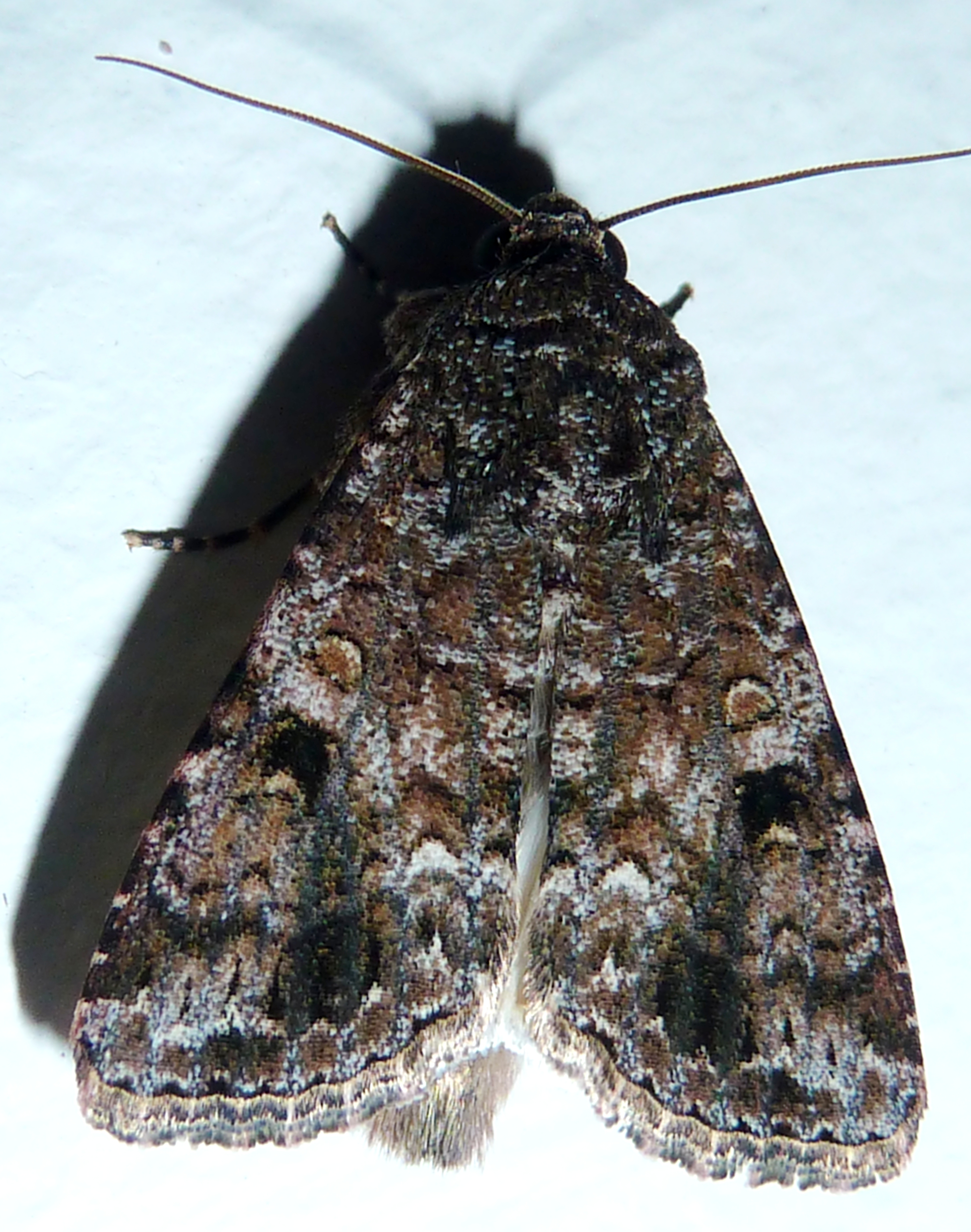

Scientific classification
- Kingdom: Animalia
- Phylum: Arthropoda
- Clade: Pancrustacea
- Class: Insecta
- Order: Lepidoptera
- Superfamily: Noctuoidea
- Family: Noctuidae
- Genus: Spodoptera
- Species: S. triturata

Binomial name
- Spodoptera triturata (Walker, [1857])

Synonyms
- Caradrina triturata Walker, 1857; Celaena bisignata Walker, 1865

= Spodoptera triturata =

Lawn worm

Species of moth

Spodoptera triturata, the lawn worm, is an Afrotropical moth of the family Noctuidae found in Sierra Leone, the Democratic Republic of Congo, Kenya, and South Africa.

== See also ==
- African armyworm (Spodoptera exempta)
