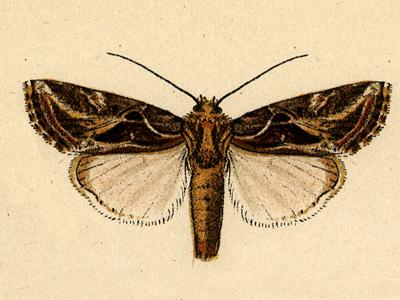

Scientific classification
- Kingdom: Animalia
- Phylum: Arthropoda
- Clade: Pancrustacea
- Class: Insecta
- Order: Lepidoptera
- Superfamily: Noctuoidea
- Family: Noctuidae
- Genus: Spodoptera
- Species: S. pulchella

Binomial name
- Spodoptera pulchella (Herrich-Schäffer, 1868)

Synonyms
- Laphygma pulchella Herrich-Schäffer, 1868; Prodenia pulchella; Prodenia exquisita Möschler, 1886

= Spodoptera pulchella =

Caribbean armyworm moth

Species of moth

Spodoptera pulchella, the Caribbean armyworm moth, is a moth of the family Noctuidae found in Florida and Texas, Central America, the Greater Antilles, and the Bahamas. It was first described by Gottlieb August Wilhelm Herrich-Schäffer in 1868.

The wingspan is about 35 mm.
