= Spodoptera peruviana =

Scientific classification
- Kingdom: Animalia
- Phylum: Arthropoda
- Clade: Pancrustacea
- Class: Insecta
- Order: Lepidoptera
- Superfamily: Noctuoidea
- Family: Noctuidae
- Genus: Spodoptera
- Species: S. peruviana

Binomial name
- Spodoptera peruviana (Walker, 1865)

Synonyms
- Laphygma peruviana Walker, 1865; Laphygma communicata Walker, 1869; Xylomyges peruviana

Species of moth

Spodoptera peruviana is a moth of the family Noctuidae. It is found in South America, including Peru.
