= Spodoptera umbraculata =

Scientific classification
- Kingdom: Animalia
- Phylum: Arthropoda
- Clade: Pancrustacea
- Class: Insecta
- Order: Lepidoptera
- Superfamily: Noctuoidea
- Family: Noctuidae
- Genus: Spodoptera
- Species: S. umbraculata

Binomial name
- Spodoptera umbraculata (Walker, 1858)

Synonyms
- Eumichtis umbraculata Walker, 1858; Agrotis enunciatus Lucas, 1892; Hadena andrias Meyrick, 1902

Species of moth

Spodoptera umbraculata is a moth of the family Noctuidae endemic to New South Wales and Queensland. The larvae feed on grasses.

== See also ==
- African armyworm (Spodoptera exempta)
