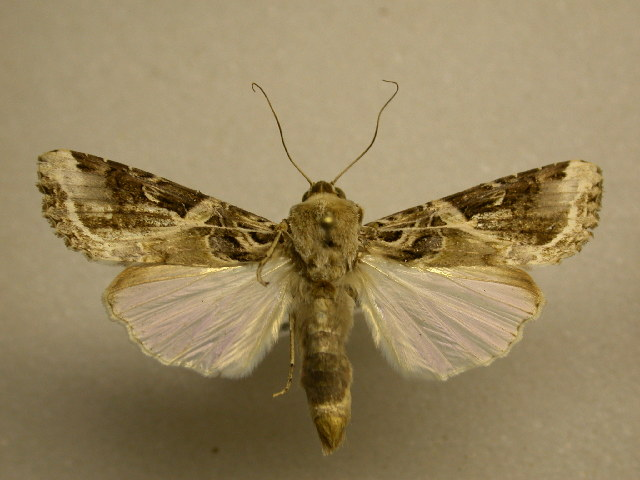

Scientific classification
- Kingdom: Animalia
- Phylum: Arthropoda
- Clade: Pancrustacea
- Class: Insecta
- Order: Lepidoptera
- Superfamily: Noctuoidea
- Family: Noctuidae
- Tribe: Prodeniini
- Genus: Spodoptera
- Species: S. androgea

Binomial name
- Spodoptera androgea (Stoll, 1780)

= Spodoptera androgea =

Species of moth

Spodoptera androgea, the androgea armyworm moth, is a species of cutworm or dart moth in the family Noctuidae. It is found in North America.

The MONA or Hodges number for Spodoptera androgea is 9671.1.
