= Cobbania =

Scientific classification
- Kingdom: Plantae
- Clade: Tracheophytes
- Clade: Angiosperms
- Clade: Monocots
- Order: Alismatales
- Family: Araceae
- Genus: †Cobbania; Stockey, G.W. Rothwell, K.R. Johnson

Type species
- Cobbania corrugata (Lesq.) Stockey, G.W. Rothwell, K.R. Johnson

Extinct genus of floating plants

Cobbania is an extinct genus of floating aroids named after William A. Cobban, all of them sharing close similarities with the more well-known water lettuce. It contains three species; Cobbania corrugata, Cobbania hickeyi, and Cobbania pharao.

In 1876, the type species Cobbania corrugata was first described as Pistia corrugata by Leo Lesquereux; only in 2007 was it moved to its own genus, Cobbania.
