= Cobbania pharao =

Scientific classification
- Kingdom: Plantae
- Clade: Tracheophytes
- Clade: Angiosperms
- Clade: Monocots
- Order: Alismatales
- Family: Araceae
- Genus: †Cobbania
- Species: †C. pharao

Binomial name
- †Cobbania pharao Coiffard & B.A.R.Mohr

Extinct species of floating plant

Cobbania pharao is an extinct species of floating aroid that was formally described in 2018. The species epithet pharao refers to its unusually large leaves as it is a Latin derivative of Pharaoh, a title given to rulers in ancient Egypt.
