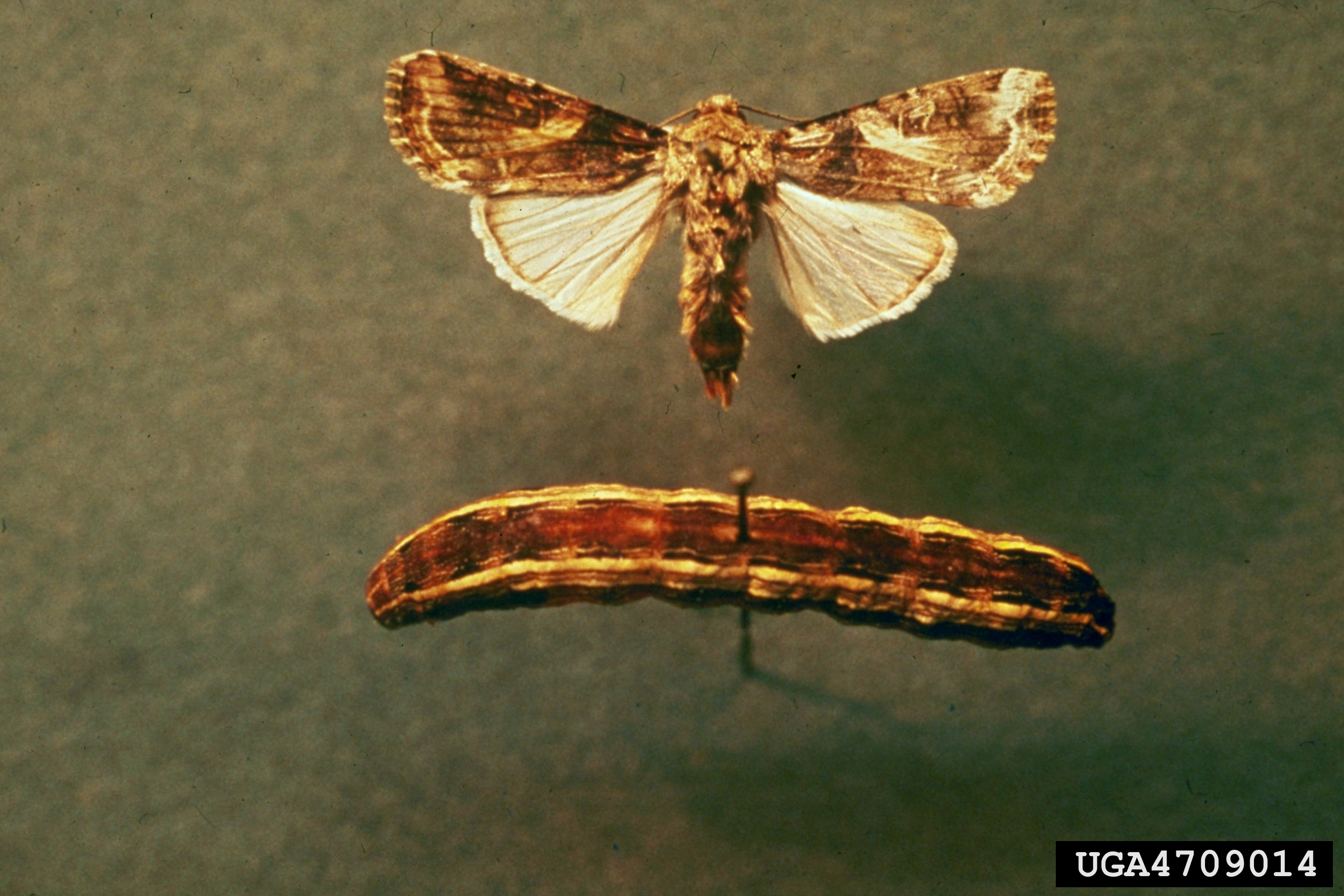

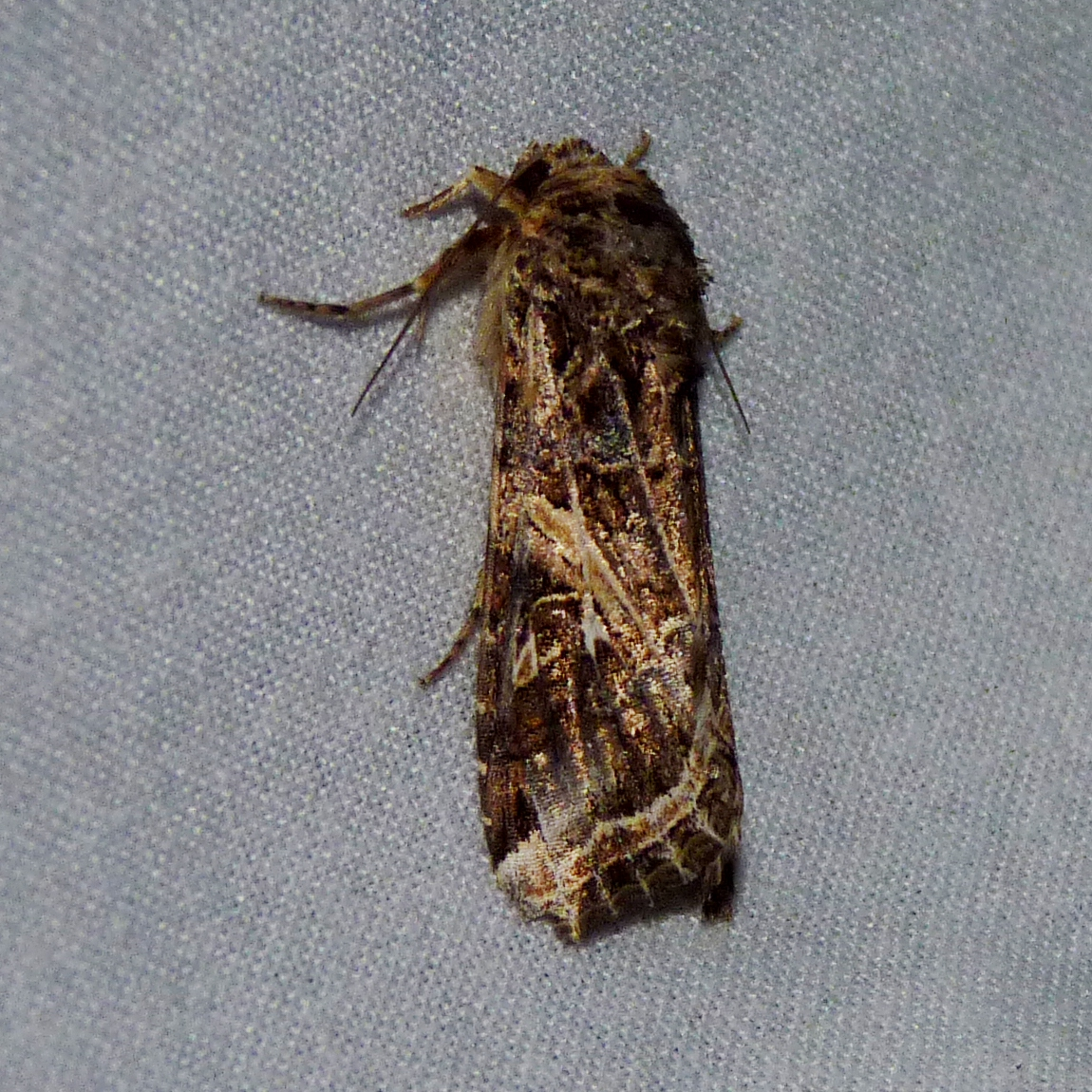

Scientific classification
- Kingdom: Animalia
- Phylum: Arthropoda
- Clade: Pancrustacea
- Class: Insecta
- Order: Lepidoptera
- Superfamily: Noctuoidea
- Family: Noctuidae
- Genus: Spodoptera
- Species: S. ornithogalli

Binomial name
- Spodoptera ornithogalli Guenée, 1852

Synonyms
- Prodenia eudiopta; Prodenia lineatella; Prodenia flavimedia; Prodenia ornithogalli; Spodoptera eudiopta; Spodoptera variolosa; Spodoptera flavimedia; Spodoptera lineatella

= Spodoptera ornithogalli =

Species of moth

Spodoptera ornithogalli (yellow-striped armyworm, cotton cutworm) is a moth of the family Noctuidae.

When first discovered this particular species was thought to be the American representative of S. littoralis as the two species have very similar forms. However, S. ornithogalli is known to have much darker color body with sharper markings.

== Description ==
Illustration

The wingspan of the adult moth is 32–44 millimetres (1 1/4–1 3/4 in). The fore-wing is brown with tan markings and a blurry white stripe coming from the wing tip. The hind-wing is white with a thin brown margin. Larvae are black with thin yellow stripes on their sides.

Adults are on wing from April to November depending on the location.

== Distribution ==
=== Geographic distribution ===
==== North America ====
- Canada: Ontario, Quebec
- Mexico
- United States: Alabama, Arizona, Arkansas, California, Colorado, Connecticut, Delaware, Florida, Georgia, Illinois, Indiana, Iowa, Kansas, Kentucky, Louisiana, Maine, Maryland, Massachusetts, Michigan, Minnesota, Mississippi, Missouri, Nebraska, New Hampshire, New Jersey, New Mexico, New York, North Carolina, Ohio, Oklahoma, Pennsylvania, Rhode Island, South Carolina, Tennessee, Texas, Utah, Virginia, West Virginia, Wisconsin

==== Central America and the Caribbean ====
- Antigua and Barbuda, Bermuda, Costa Rica, Cuba, Dominica, Dominican Republic, El Salvador, Guatemala, Honduras, Jamaica, Puerto Rico

==== South America ====
- Argentina
- Bolivia
- Brazil: Acre, Bahia, Federal District, Espírito Santo, Mato Grosso, Mato Grosso do Sul, Pará, Paraná, Rio Grande do Sul, Roraima, Tocantins
- Colombia
- Ecuador
- French Guiana
- Peru
- Suriname
- Venezuela

==== Europe ====
There were repeated port interceptions throughout 2020, especially on consignments of asparagus from the Americas. Nonetheless so far S. ornithogalli remains otherwise absent from Europe.

- Denmark: Phytosanitation interceptions only.

==== Asia ====
- Japan: Phytosanitation interceptions only.

=== Ecological distribution ===
For the complete list see EPPO GD's hosts list.

The larvae feed on various crops, including alfalfa, asparagus, bean, beet, cabbage, clover, maize/corn, cotton, cucumber, hops, grape, grass, jimsonweed, morning glory, onion, pea, peach, peanut, potato, sorghum, soybean, sunflower, sweet potato, Swiss chard, tobacco, tomato, turnip, wheat, watermelon, and wild onion; ornamentals including chrysanthemum and roses; and pioneer species including Amaranthus retroflexus, Chenopodium album, Datura stramonium, Erigeron canadensis, Plantago lanceolata, and Rumex.
