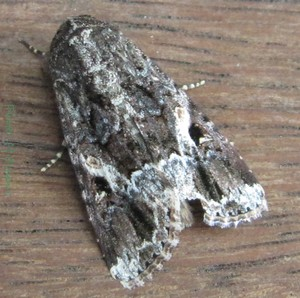
- Spodoptera mauritia

Scientific classification
- Domain: Eukaryota
- Kingdom: Animalia
- Phylum: Arthropoda
- Class: Insecta
- Order: Lepidoptera
- Superfamily: Noctuoidea
- Family: Noctuidae
- Tribe: Prodeniini
- Genus: Spodoptera; Guenée, 1852

Synonyms
- Calogramma Guenée, 1852; Douzdrina de Laever, 1985; Laphygma Guenée, 1852; Prodenia Guenée, 1852; Rusidrina Staudinger, 1892

= Spodoptera =

Genus of moths

Spodoptera is a genus of moths of the family Noctuidae erected by Achille Guenée in 1852. Many are known as pest insects. The larvae are sometimes called armyworms. The roughly thirty species are distributed across six continents.

== Description ==
No tufts behind collar as in Euplexia, but only tufts present on metathorax. Scales much smoother. Abdominal tufts slight. Fore tibial tufts are very developed. Cilia slightly crenulated. Antennae almost simple.

== Species ==
- Spodoptera abyssinia Guenée, 1852
- Spodoptera albula (Walker, 1857) (orth. var. S. albulum)
- Spodoptera androgea (Stoll, [1782])
- Spodoptera angulata (Gaede, 1935)
- Spodoptera apertura (Walker, 1865)
- Spodoptera cilium Guenée, 1852 – grasslawn armyworm
- Spodoptera compta (Walker, 1869)
- Spodoptera connexa (Wileman, 1914)
- Spodoptera depravata (Butler, 1879)
- Spodoptera dolichos (Fabricius, 1794) – sweet potato armyworm
- Spodoptera eridania (Cramer) – southern armyworm
- Spodoptera evanida Schaus, 1914
- Spodoptera excelsa Rougeot & Laporte, 1983
- Spodoptera exempta (Walker, [1857]) – African armyworm
- Spodoptera exigua (Hübner, [1808]) – beet armyworm
- Spodoptera fasciculata (Berio, 1973)
- Spodoptera frugiperda (Smith, 1797) – fall armyworm
- Spodoptera hipparis (Druce, 1889)
- Spodoptera latifascia (Walker, 1856) – velvet armyworm
- Spodoptera littoralis (Boisduval, 1833) – African cotton leafworm
- Spodoptera litura (Fabricius, 1775) – Oriental leafworm moth
- Spodoptera malagasy Viette, 1967
- Spodoptera marima (Schaus, 1904) syn. S. ornithogalli below
- Spodoptera mauritia (Boisduval, 1833) – lawn armyworm
- Spodoptera ochrea (Hampson, 1909)
- Spodoptera ornithogalli (Guenée, 1852) – yellow-striped armyworm
- Spodoptera pecten Guenée, 1852
- Spodoptera pectinicornis (Hampson, 1895) – water-lettuce moth
- Spodoptera peruviana (Walker, 1865)
- Spodoptera picta (Guérin-Méneville, [1838])
- Spodoptera praefica (Grote, 1875) – western yellowstriped armyworm
- Spodoptera pulchella (Herrich-Schäffer, 1868) – Caribbean armyworm
- Spodoptera roseae (Schaus, 1923)
- Spodoptera semiluna (Hampson, 1909)
- Spodoptera sebastian (Swanson-Knope, 1919)
- Spodoptera teferii Laporte, 194
- Spodoptera triturata (Walker, [1857])
- Spodoptera umbraculata (Walker, 1858)
