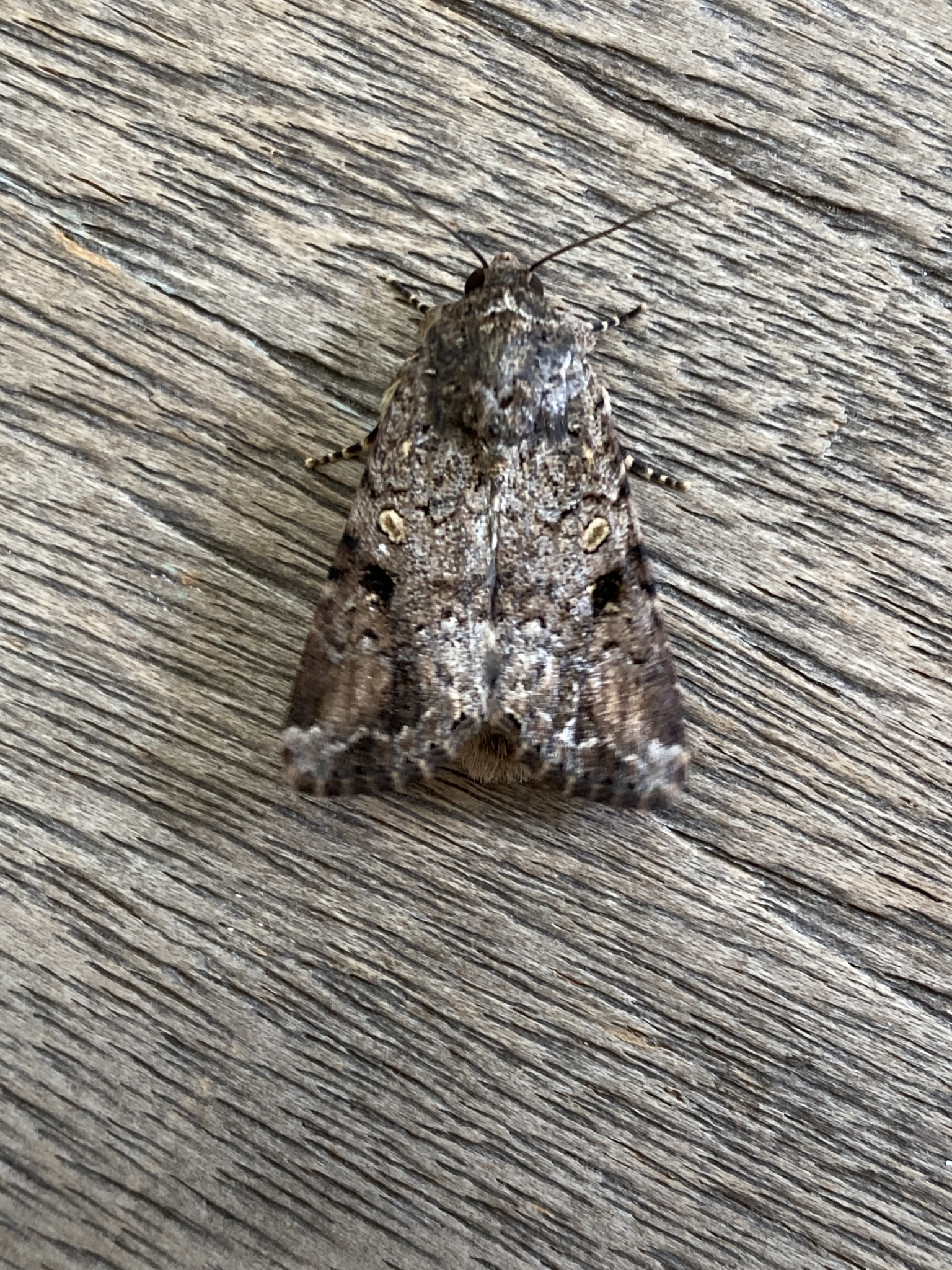

Scientific classification
- Kingdom: Animalia
- Phylum: Arthropoda
- Clade: Pancrustacea
- Class: Insecta
- Order: Lepidoptera
- Superfamily: Noctuoidea
- Family: Noctuidae
- Genus: Spodoptera
- Species: S. mauritia

Binomial name
- Spodoptera mauritia (Boisduval, 1833)

Synonyms
- Hadena mauritia Boisduval, 1833; Agrotis aliena Walker, 1865; Laphygma gratiosa Walker, 1865; Orthosia margarita Hawthorne, 1897; Agrotis yernauxi Hulstaert, 1924; Spodoptera acronyctoides Guenée, 1852; Spodoptera acronyctiformis Guenée, 1852; Spodoptera filum Guenée, 1852; Spodoptera nubes Guenée, 1852; Euxoa ogasawarensis Matsumura, 1926; Prodenia infecta Walker, 1856; Prodenia insignata Walker, 1856; Prodenia permunda Walker, 1857; Agrotis transducta Walker, [1857]; Agrotis bisignata Walker, 1865 (preocc. Celaena bisignata Walker, 1865); Laphygma squalida Walker, 1865; Agrotis submarginalis Walker, 1865; Hadena obliqua Walker, 1865; Prodenia venustula Walker, 1865; Hermonassa formosana Matsumura, 1913

= Spodoptera mauritia =

Lawn armyworm

Species of moth

Spodoptera mauritia, the lawn armyworm or paddy swarming caterpillar, is a moth of the family Noctuidae. The species was first described by Jean Baptiste Boisduval in 1833. Able to eat many types of food, it is a major pest throughout the world.

== Distribution ==
It is widespread from the Red Sea to India, Myanmar, Sri Lanka, Malaya to Australia and widespread in the Pacific Islands, including the Solomons, New Hebrides, Fiji, Samoa, Hawaii, the Society Islands, Austral Islands, Marquesas and the Marshall Islands.

== Description ==
The wingspan is about 40 mm. It is dark grey brown with a rusty tinge on its body. The abdomen is fuscous. Forewings with sub-basal, antemedial and postmedial double waved lines indistinct. The orbicular small and ochreous, whereas reniform blackish. Submarginal line whitish and irregularly waved. There is a white patch often can be seen between orbicular and reniform and a dark patch on the central marginal area. Hindwings opalescent and semi-hyaline white, with a dark marginal line.

== Ecology ==
The larvae feed on various grasses, including rice, wheat, Cynodon, Pennisetum clandestinum, Sorghum bicolor, Oryza sativa, and trees such as Casuarina equisetifolia. They are considered one of the major international agricultural pests on crops and pastures. Unlike other insects, armyworm caterpillars of their sixth instar do not excrete uric acid, instead they excrete urea as nitrogenous wastes. Spodoptera mauritia has been found in the feces of the Greater tube-nosed bat.

== Damage and control ==
Plants attacked by caterpillars have skeletonized leaves, shot holes, and dieback stems. Commonly the entire paddy crop dies within few days due to swarming attack. Hand picking and other mechanical methods are used to reduce infection. Adults can be eliminated by introducing bolas spiders to the fields. This spider has the ability to spray a pheromone similar to the female moth, to attract male moths. The nematode Steinernema carpocapsae and usage of viruses like Nucleopolyhedrovirus are also effective. Moths traps like wing traps and unitraps can also used to collect adults.

== Legacy ==
- In 1969, small outbreaks of less than 200 acres have been reported in the Sabah region of Malaysia, but in 6,000 square miles of outbreak was recorded from Sarawak. These attacks vanished 20% of total rice production in Malaysia.
- In 1981, paddy nurseries near marshy areas were severely affected by armyworm in Indonesia. This induced transplanting programs throughout the country and re-sowing of seedlings into the field highly susceptible to the attack.
- In 1983, nursery beds were devastated by the caterpillars, reduced the total rice production.
- In Sri Lanka, the heavy outbreaks were recorded twice from the country, first in 1904 and then in 1920, where Jaffna paddy cultivations were destroyed by the caterpillars.
- An outbreak has been reported in Dibrugarh district of Assam, India during Kharif, 2012
- The outbreak during Kharif, 2016 in Assam has been considered as one of the most devastating outbreaks in the state of Assam, India with an infestation in more than 34,650 ha area of rice across 28 districts.

== Subspecies ==
- S. m. mauritia (Indian Ocean)
- S. m. acronyctoides Guenée, 1852 (Oriental tropics, Australia, Pacific tropics, Japan)

== See also ==
- African armyworm (Spodoptera exempta)
