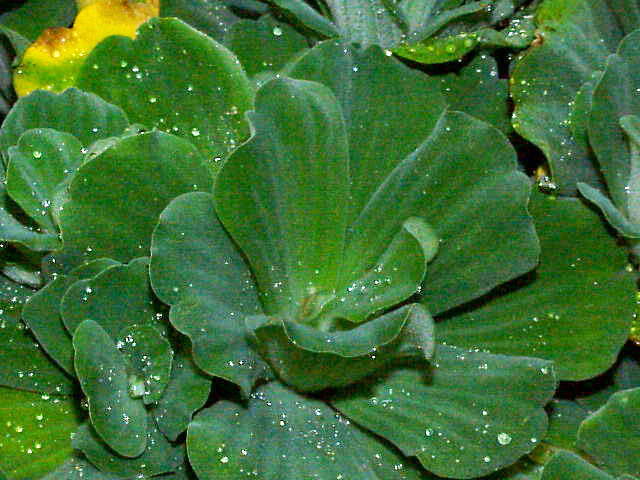

Conservation status
- Least Concern (IUCN 3.1)

Scientific classification
- Kingdom: Plantae
- Clade: Tracheophytes
- Clade: Angiosperms
- Clade: Monocots
- Order: Alismatales
- Family: Araceae
- Subfamily: Aroideae
- Tribe: Pistieae
- Genus: Pistia; L.
- Species: P. stratiotes

Binomial name
- Pistia stratiotes L.
- Range of the genus Pistia

Synonyms
- List: Apiospermum obcordatum (Schleid.) Klotzsch; Limnonesis commutata (Schleid.) Klotzsch; Limnonesis friedrichsthaliana Klotzsch; Pistia aegyptiaca Schleid.; Pistia aethiopica Fenzl ex Klotzsch; Pistia africana C.Presl; Pistia amazonica C.Presl; Pistia brasiliensis Klotzsch; Pistia commutata Schleid.; Pistia crispata Blume; Pistia cumingii Klotzsch; Pistia gardneri Klotzsch; Pistia horkeliana Miq.; Pistia leprieuri Blume; Pistia linguiformis Blume; Pistia minor Blume; Pistia natalensis Klotzsch; Pistia obcordata Schleid.; Pistia occidentalis Blume; Pistia schleideniana Klotzsch; Pistia spathulata Michx.; Pistia stratiotes var. cuneata Engl.; Pistia stratiotes var. linguiformis Engl.; Pistia stratiotes var. obcordata (Schleid.) Engl.; Pistia stratiotes var. spathulata (Michx.) Engl.; Pistia texensis Klotzsch; Pistia turpinii K.Koch; Pistia weigeltiana C.Presl; Zala asiatica Lour.

= Pistia =

Species of aquatic flowering plant

Pistia is a genus of aquatic plants in the arum family, Araceae. It is the sole genus in the tribe Pistieae which reflects its systematic isolation within the family. The single species it contains, Pistia stratiotes, is often called water cabbage, water lettuce, Nile cabbage, or shellflower. Its native distribution is uncertain but is probably pantropical; it was first scientifically described from plants found on the Nile near Lake Victoria in Africa. It is now present, either naturally or through human introduction, in nearly all tropical and subtropical fresh waterways and is considered an invasive species as well as a mosquito breeding habitat. The specific epithet is derived from a Greek word, στρατιώτης, meaning "soldier", which references the sword-shaped leaves of some plants in the genus Stratiotes.

== Description ==
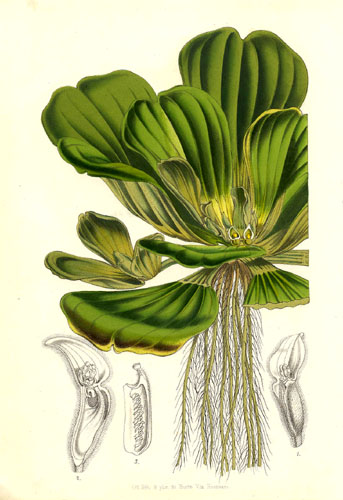
19th-century illustration of Pistia stratiotes

Pistia stratiotes is a perennial monocotyledon with thick, soft leaves that form a rosette. It floats on the surface of the water, its roots hanging submersed beneath floating leaves. The leaves can measure 2–15 cm (0.8–5.9 in) long and are light green, with parallel venations and wavy margins. The surface of the leaves is covered in short, white hairs which form basket-like structures that can trap air bubbles and increase the plant's buoyancy. The spongy parenchyma with large intercellular spaces in the leaves also aids the plant in floating.

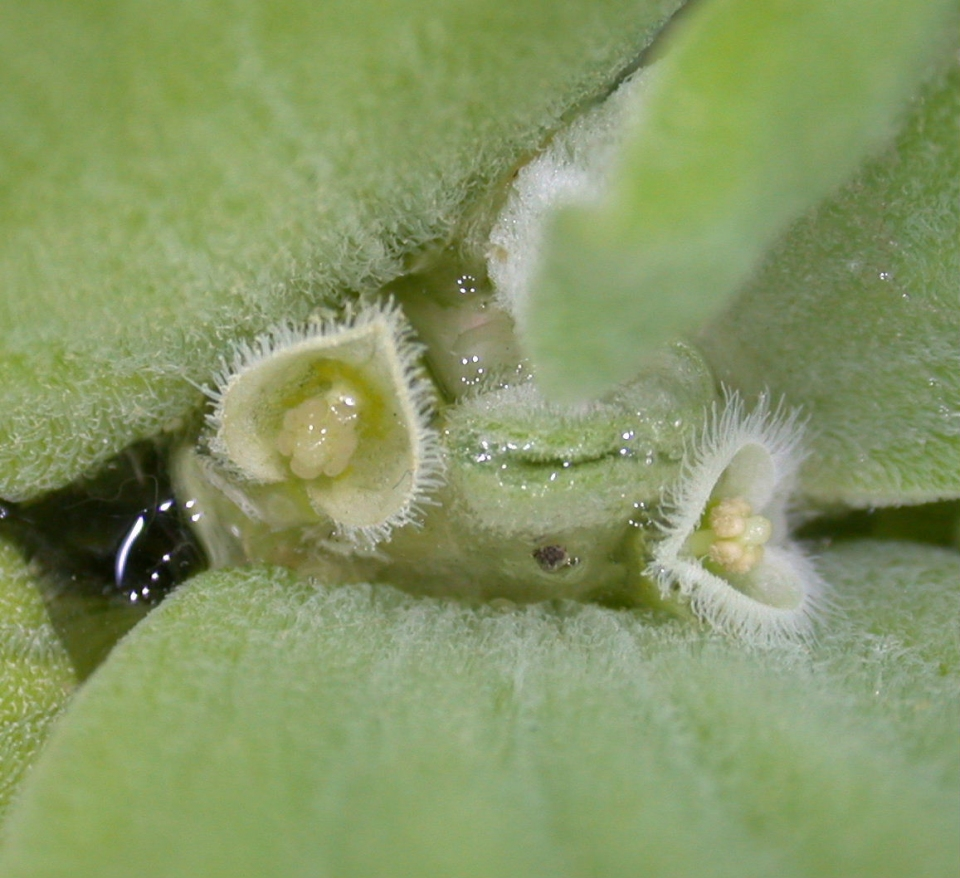
A close-up view of the flower

The flowers are dioecious, lack petals, and are hidden in the middle of the plant amongst the leaves. Pistia stratiotes has a spadix inflorescence, containing one pistillate flower with one ovary and 2–8 staminate flowers with two stamens. The pistillate and carpellate flowers are separated by folds in the spathe, where the male flowers are located above the female flowers. Oval, green berries with ovoid seeds form after successful fertilization. The plant undergoes asexual reproduction by propagating through stolons, yet evidence of sexual reproduction has also been observed in the ponds of Southern Brazil.

Pistia stratiotes are found in slow-moving rivers, lakes, and ponds. The species displays optimal growth in the temperature range of 22–30 °C (72–86 °F), but can endure extreme temperatures up to 35 °C (95 °F). As a result, Pistia stratiotes do not grow in colder temperatures, beyond the tropics of Cancer and Capricorn. The species also require slightly acidic water in the pH range of 6.5–7.2 for optimal growth.

== Invasion ==
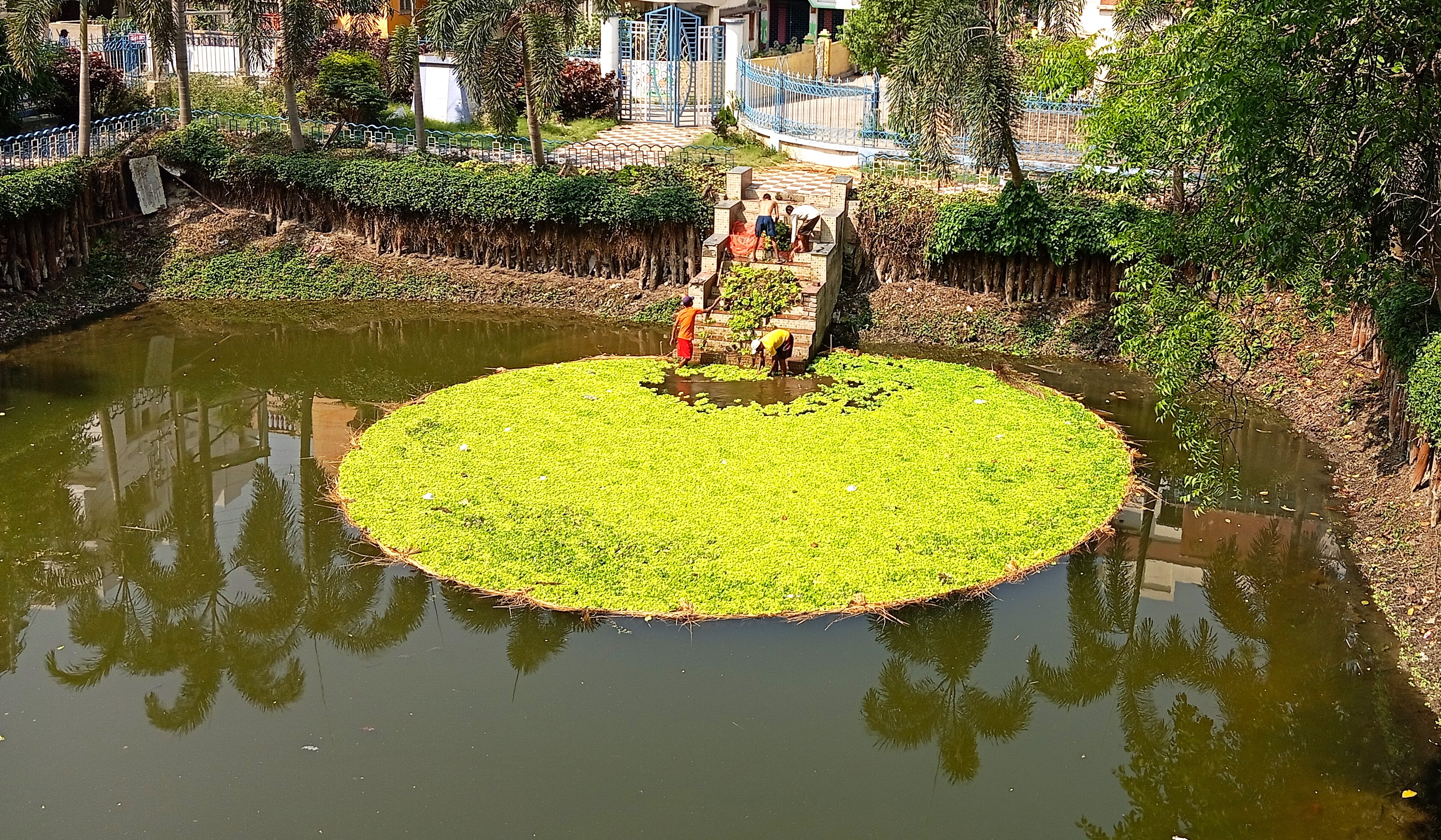
Manual removal of water lettuce, Kolkata, West Bengal

Water lettuce is among the world's most productive freshwater aquatic plants and is considered an invasive species. The species can be introduced to new areas by water dispersal, fragmentation, and hitchhiking on marine transportation or fishing equipment. The invasion of Pistia stratiotes in the ecosystem can lead to environmental and socio-economic ramifications to the community it serves. In waters with high nutrient content, particularly those that have been contaminated with human loading of sewage or fertilizers, water lettuce can exhibit weedy overgrowth. It may also become invasive in hydrologically altered systems such as flood control canals and reservoirs. The severe overgrowth of water lettuce can block gas exchange in the surface water, creating hypoxic conditions and eliminating or disrupting various native marine organisms. Blocking access to sunlight, large mats of water lettuce can shade native submerged plants and alter communities relying on these native plants as a source of food. The growth of these mats can also get tangled in boat propellers and create challenges for boaters or recreational fishermen.

Pistia stratiotes feature in the life cycles of certain insect vectors for malaria and filariasis. Mosquitoes of the genus Mansonia lay their eggs under the leaves of aquatic plants, such as Pistia stratiotes. Twenty-four hours later, the emerging larvae attach to the plant's roots using its siphon tube for respiration. Within a week, larvae can develop into adult mosquitos, making Pistia stratiotes a potential breeding ground for vectors of infectious disease. The moth Samea multiplicalis also uses Pistia stratiotes as its primary host plant. Eggs are laid among leaves and stems of the host plant and larvae hatch and feed intensively as they develop.

=== Control ===
1. Chemical control: Herbicides have been effective in controlling Pistia stratiotes: diquat, glyphosate, terbutryn, 2,4-D, among many others. Yet, the use of herbicides must be critically assessed to prevent negative environmental impacts and possible toxic effects on marine life and human health.
2. Physical control: Pistia stratiotes can be controlled with mechanical harvesters that remove the water lettuce from the infested waters and transport it to disposal onshore. Larger infestations can be removed with the aid of hydraulic excavators and tractors. To prevent the re-growth of Pistia stratiotes colonies, a long-term maintenance program should be implemented.
3. Biological control: Two species of insects are also being used as a biological control. Adults and larvae of the South American weevil Neohydronomous affinis feed on Pistia leaves, as do the larvae of the moth Spodoptera pectinicornis from Thailand. Both are proving to be useful tools in the management of Pistia stratiotes through the experimental recovery of benthic communities with hypoxic conditions.

The species is set to be banned in the EU from August 2024 to prevent spreading.

== Range ==
The center of origin of Pistia stratiotes has long been a source of debate. Nativity to northern Africa is indicated by Egyptian hieroglyphics and reports of plants meeting the description of Pistia by Greek botanists, Dioscorides and Theophrastus in the Nile River. In addition, the co-evolution of Pistia stratiotes with various insects native to Brazil and Argentina, such as the water lettuce weevil, indicates a long-term native tenure in South America. Fossil specimens dating back to the late Pleistocene (~12,000 BP) and early Holocene (~3,500 BP) period are reported from Florida, indicating a native presence in the southeastern United States. Recent genetic evidence also suggests that Pistia is not actually a monotypic genus, as had been long assumed. Instead, Pistia appears to be composed of at least three genetically distinct, but morphologically and ecologically similar, species at a global scale.

=== Temperate occurrences ===
Though Pistia stratiotes is intolerant of cold temperatures, it has been recorded growing at least temporarily in temperate areas of North America and Europe. In the United States north of the Gulf of Mexico it has been found growing in Colorado, Connecticut, Delaware, Illinois, Kansas, Maryland, Michigan, Minnesota, Missouri, New York, North Carolina, Ohio, Rhode Island, South Carolina, and Wisconsin. One of these occurrences, in Idaho, survives in an area of a river fed by a hot spring. The rest are thought either to be completely eradicated by cold weather or possibly to survive by seed production.

== Fossil record ==
Pistia-like plants appear in the fossil record during the Late Cretaceous epoch in rock strata from the western interior of North America. They were first described as †Pistia corrugata by Leo Lesquereux in 1876 based on specimens from the Almond Formation of Wyoming (late Campanian age). However, based on more complete specimens from the Campanian Dinosaur Park Formation of southern Alberta, Canada, and other areas, they were redescribed as a separate genus, †Cobbania, primarily due to differences in leaf morphology. Younger fossils attributed to Pistia stratiotes have described from Eocene strata in the southeastern United States, and 350 fossil seeds of †Pistia sibirica have been described from middle Miocene strata of the Fasterholt area near Silkeborg in Central Jutland, Denmark. Fossils of this species have also been described from the Oligocene and Miocene of Western Siberia and from the Miocene of Germany.

A specimen of Pistia from the Florida peninsula dating from at least 3,550 years Before Present and a report of Holocene Pistia fossils from a lake in south central Florida are consistent with genetic evidence indicating that some varieties of Pistia stratiotes are native to the southeastern United States.

== Uses ==
=== Consumption ===
While considered edible, Pistia stratiotes is not palatable as it is rich in calcium oxalate crystals that are bitter in taste. Nevertheless, there are records of the plant being utilized as famine food in India during the Great Famine of 1876–1878.

The Hausa people of Nigeria used the ash of the plant as a substitute for salt due to its high concentration of potassium chloride, a mineral salt. This salt substitute, also called zakankau, was of high importance, especially when imported salt was unavailable.

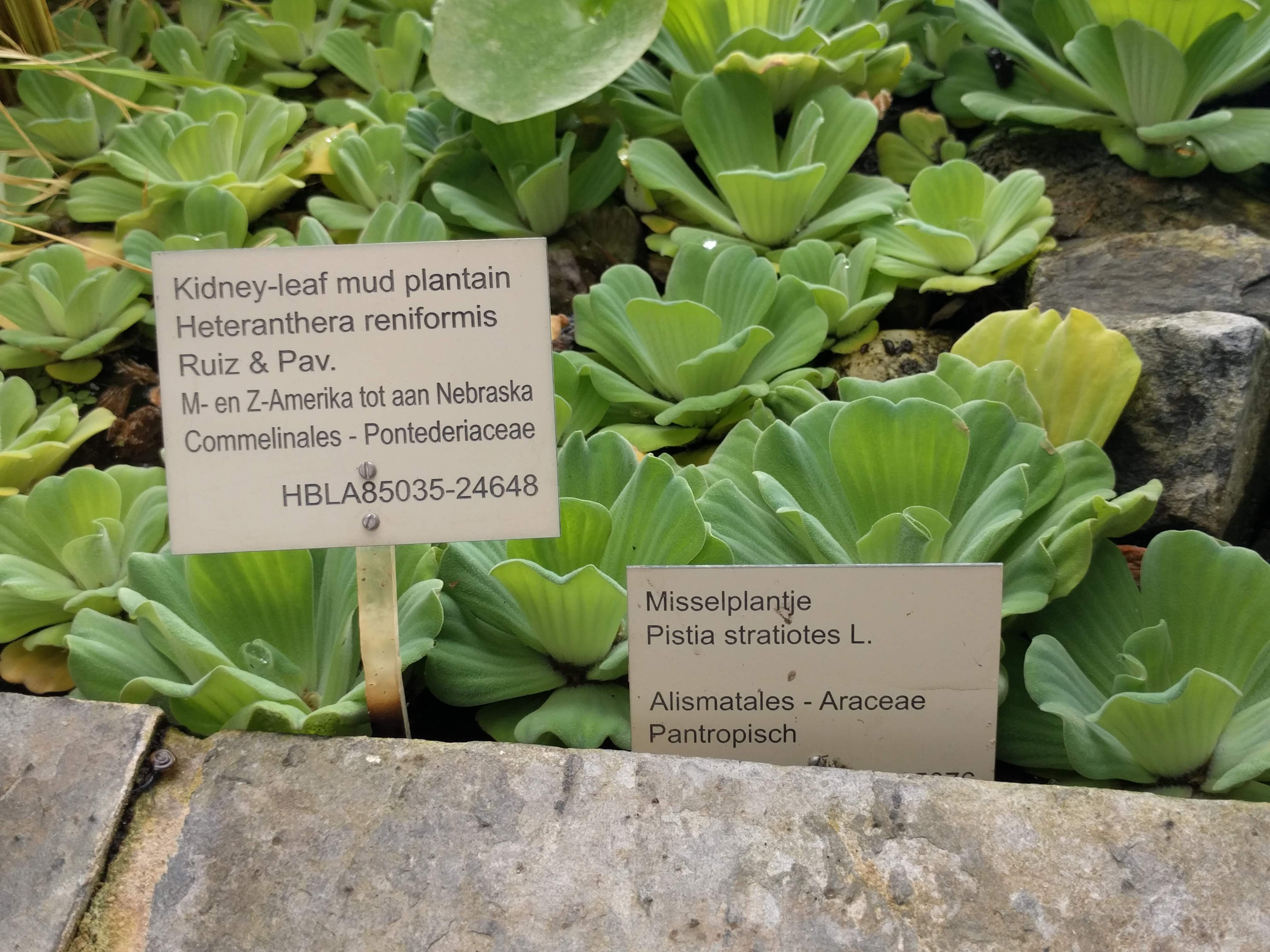
Heteranthera reniformis with Pistia stratiotes

Caution is advised when consuming Pistia stratiotes, as the plant is a hyperaccumulator, and can absorb and accumulate toxic heavy metals present in its environment. The presence of high concentrations of calcium oxalate crystals can induce various health concerns, such as inhibited mineral absorption and kidney stones.

In Singapore and Southern China, Pistia stratiotes is commonly grown or collected as animal feed for ducks and pigs. Water lettuce is also considered an alternative for poultry feed in Indonesia due to its high content of crude protein.

=== Traditional medicine ===
There are various traditional medical uses of Pistia stratiotes throughout regions in Asia and Africa. In Nigeria, the dried leaves are prepared into a powder form and are applied to wounds and sores for disinfection. A similar use is present in Indian traditional medicine, where the powdered leaf is applied to syphilitic eruptions and skin infections. In Nigeria and Gambia, the leaf is infused in water to create an eyewash to attempt to treat allergic conjunctivitis. The eyewash is alleged to have a cooling and analgesic effect, leading the plant to be commonly called 'eye-pity' in Africa. In addition, the leaves of Pistia stratiotes can be burned into ash. In Indian and Nigerian traditional medicine, the ash is used in treating ringworm infections of the scalp.

==== Studied properties ====
- Anti-inflammatory properties: Extractions of the leaves of P. stratiotes reduces mast infiltration and degranulation in allergic reactions and presents anti-inflammatory properties. The ethanolic extracts have also been positively correlated with a reduction in inflammatory disorders, such as arthritis and fevers in rats.
- Antifungal properties: With the popular use of Pistia stratiotes as a traditional treatment for ringworms, researchers have tested P. stratiotes methanolic extracts on dermatophyte fungi. The results of the studies depicted significant fungicidal activity on T. rubrum, T. mentagrophytes, and E. floccosum.

=== Environmental remediation ===
The high sorption property of water lettuce makes it a great candidate for biodegradable oil sorbents in marine oil spills. Particularly, the leaves of Pistia stratiotes can efficiently absorb significant amounts of hydrocarbons due to its large surface area and hydrophobicity.

As a hyper-accumulator, Pistia stratiotes has been studied as a potential candidate for wastewater treatment plants. The roots and leaves of the plant have been found to absorb excess nutrients and heavy metals, such as zinc, chromium, and cadmium in contaminated waters. Pistira stratiotes has also been shown to accumulate mercury in its roots.

Pistia stratiotes can be grown in water gardens to reduce harmful algal blooms and eutrophic conditions. The plant is able to control the growth of algae by restricting light penetration in the water column and competing for nutrients, with significant uptake of phosphorus and ammonia nitrogen.

== See also ==
- Phytoremediation plants
- Hyperaccumulators table – 3
