= Delta-Palutoxin =

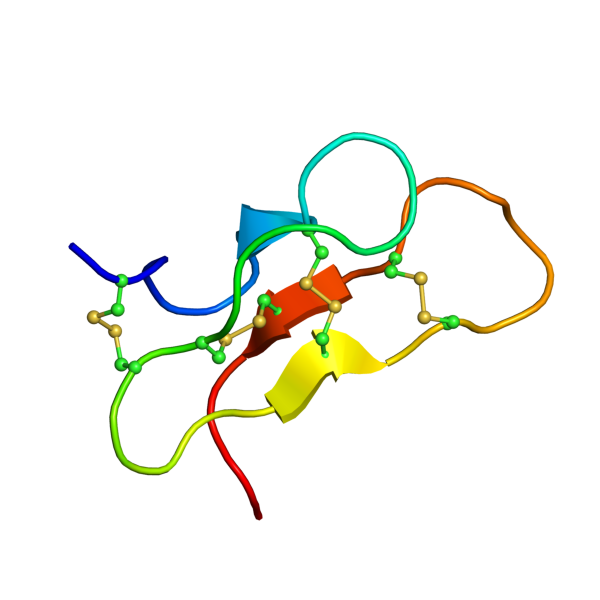
Solution structure of insecticidal toxin δ-palutoxin IT2. PDB entry 1v91

delta-Palutoxins (δ-palutoxins) consist of a homologous group of four insect-specific toxins from the venom of the spider Pireneitega luctuosa (also known as Paracoelotes luctuosus). They show a high toxicity against Spodoptera litura larvae by inhibiting sodium channels, leading to strong paralytic activity and eventually to the death of the insect.

== Sources ==
δ-Palutoxins are extracted from the venom of the spider Pireneitega luctuosa. This venom has highest toxicity against Spodoptera litura larvae, which are a known cause of the crop pest in agriculture.

== Chemistry ==
There are four subfractions in the venom known to be active against the Spodoptera litura larvae: δ-palutoxin IT1, δ-palutxoin IT2, δ-palutoxin IT3, and δ-palutoxin IT4. These toxins are 36-37 amino acids long and show high homology. The concentrations of the different subtypes in the venom, molecular masses, and acidity level of the subtypes are listed below.

Toxin subtype	Concentration in venom (nmole/10μL)	Molecular mass (kDa)	Acidity level
δ-Palutoxin IT1	1.0	4.03	Neutral
δ-Palutoxin IT2	2.6	4.12	Slightly basic
δ-Palutoxin IT3	1.3	3.93	Acidic
δ-Palutoxin IT4	1.9	4.05	Slightly basic

δ-Palutoxins are very compact proteins due to their four disulfide bridges. These bindings result in a disulfide pseudo-knot, characteristic for a class of toxins that contain the ‘inhibitor cystine knot motif’ (ICK). This motif is responsible for their high in vivo stability. Members of the ICK family are characterized by a triple-stranded, antiparallel β-sheet structure, stabilized by disulfide bridges. Within this fold-class, the biological activities of the toxins are very diverse. The disulfide bonding pattern found in δ-Palutoxins is very similar to the pattern seen in μ-Agatoxins. This indicates strong homologies with the μ-Agatoxins from Agelenopsis aperta.

== Target ==
Voltage-gated sodium channels have neurotoxin binding sites on their α-subunit, which are called neurotoxin receptor sites 1-7. δ-Palutoxins bind to receptor site 4 of insect voltage-gated sodium channels. Receptor site 4 neurotoxins bind to the S1-S2 and S3-S4 extracellular loops in domain II of the α-subunit of the channel.

== Mode of action ==
δ-Palutoxin-IT1 and δ-palutoxin-IT2 inhibit the inactivation of voltage-gated sodium channels. As the voltage-dependence of the inactivation time constant was not affected, it has been proposed that the toxins act on the conversion from the closed to the inactivated state. The inhibition of inactivation results in excessive sodium influx. This leads to a high concentration of calcium in the muscles, which causes slow paralysis. This slow paralysis is characterized by muscle spasm and loss of water through the body wall. Eventually, the insects will die because they dry out. The effect of δ-palutoxins on voltage-gated sodium channels is similar to that seen in α-like scorpion toxins.

== Toxicity ==
The four δ-palutoxins show a strong paralytic activity against Spodoptera litura larvae but also against some other insects. The LD_{50} values for δ-palutoxin-IT1 to IT3 range from 9.5–24.7 μg per gram insect. δ-Palutoxin-IT1 is the most active toxin, followed by δ-palutoxin-IT2, and δ-palutoxin-IT4 has the lowest activity. δ-Palutoxins are insect selective, no persistent toxic effect was found on mice. The structural basis for the selectivity of these toxins for insects over the mammalian sodium ion channels is still largely unknown.
