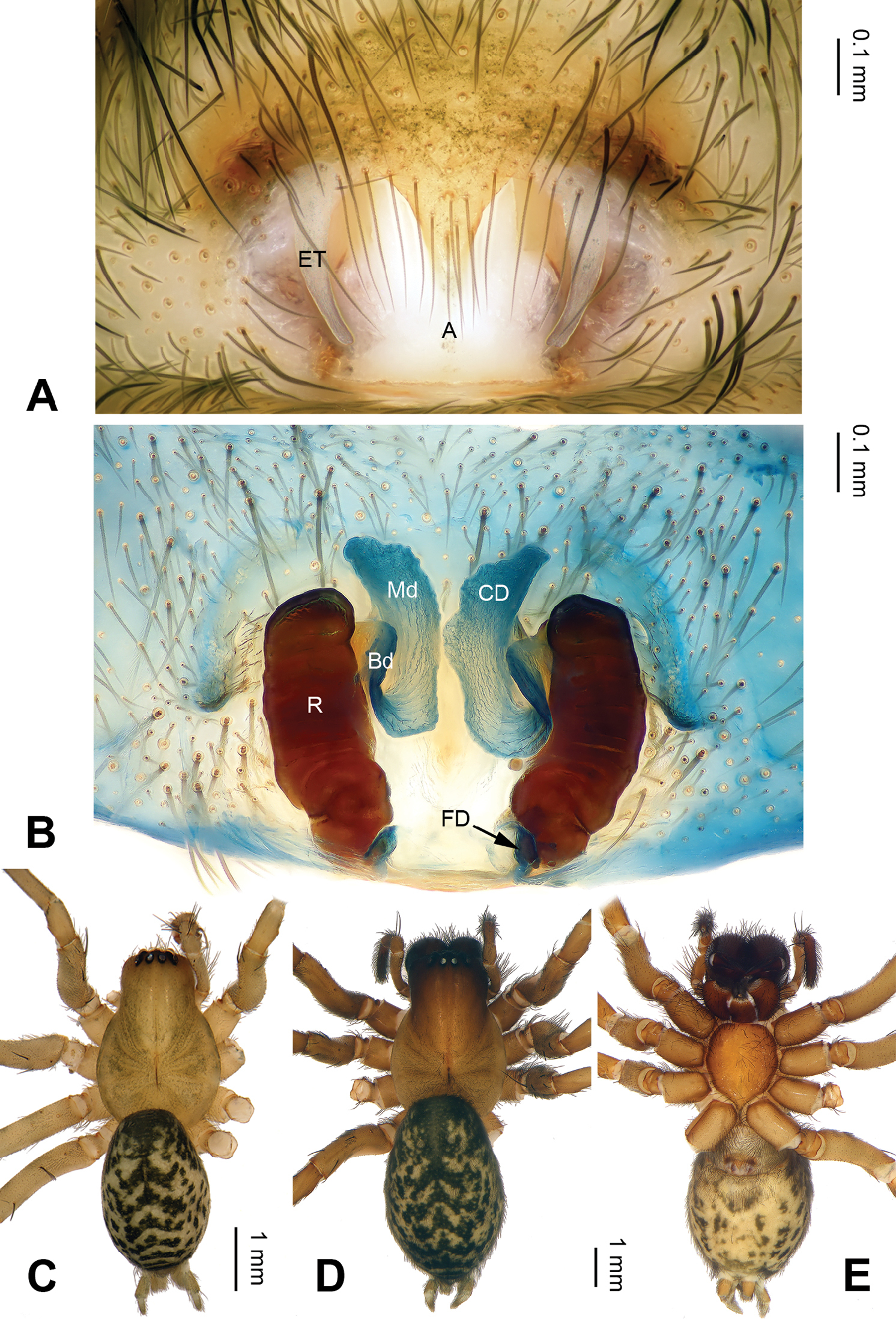
- Pireneitega huashanensis

Scientific classification
- Kingdom: Animalia
- Phylum: Arthropoda
- Subphylum: Chelicerata
- Class: Arachnida
- Order: Araneae
- Infraorder: Araneomorphae
- Family: Agelenidae
- Genus: Pireneitega; Kishida, 1955

Type species
- P. segestriformis (Dufour, 1820)

Species
- 36, see text

Synonyms
- Paracoelotes

= Pireneitega =

Genus of spiders

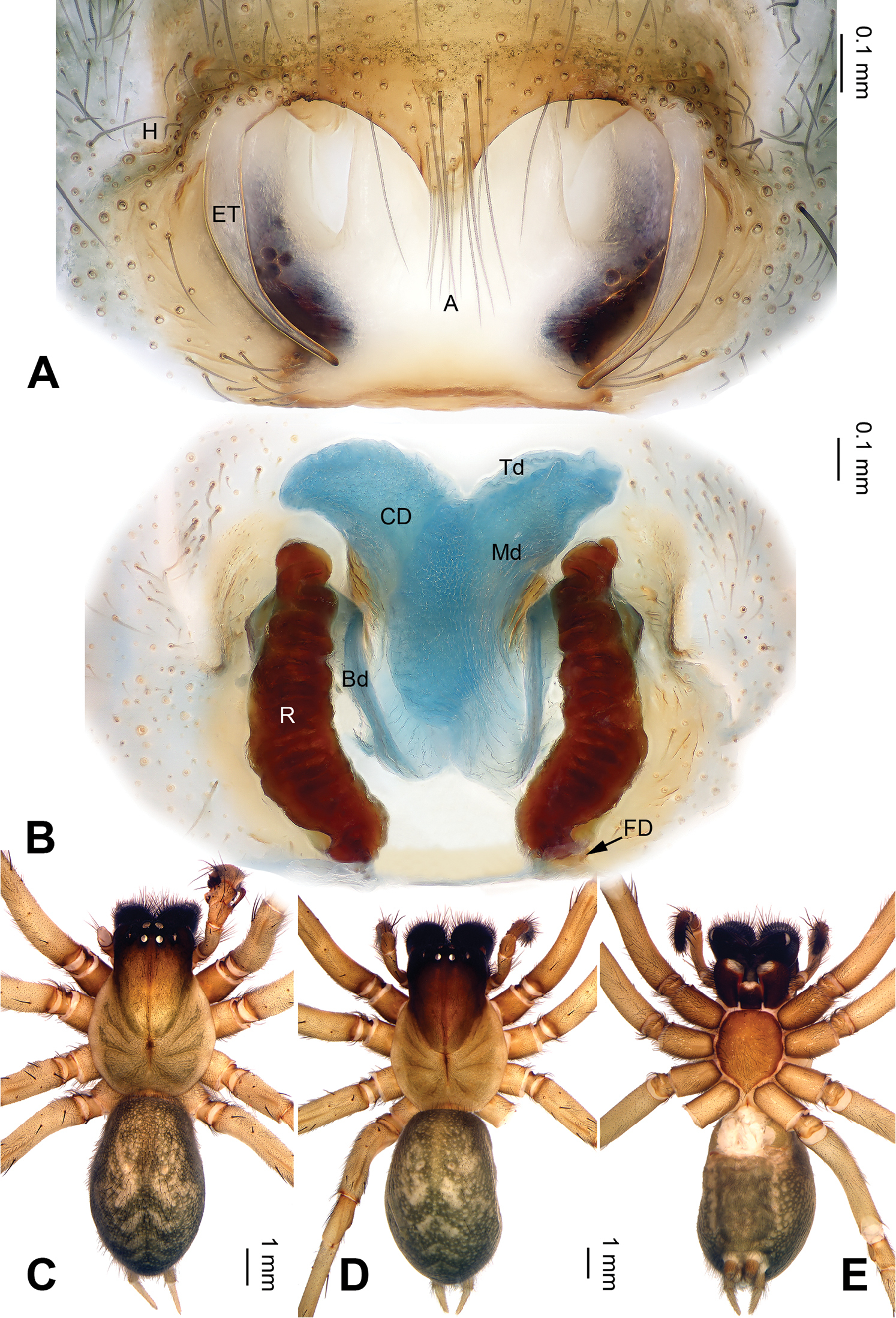
Pireneitega xiyankouensis

Pireneitega is a genus of funnel weavers first described by Kyukichi Kishida in 1955.

== Species ==
As of October 2026 it contains thirty-six species:

- Pireneitega armeniaca (Brignoli, 1978) – Turkey
- Pireneitega bidens (Caporiacco, 1935) – Karakorum
- Pireneitega burqinensis Zhao & Li, 2016 – China
- Pireneitega cottarellii (Brignoli, 1978) – Turkey
- Pireneitega fedotovi (Charitonov, 1946) – Uzbekistan
- Pireneitega fuyunensis Zhao & Li, 2016 – China
- Pireneitega garibaldii (Kritscher, 1969) – Italy
- Pireneitega gongliuensis Zhao & Li, 2016 – China
- Pireneitega huashanensis Zhao & Li, 2017 – China
- Pireneitega huochengensis Zhao & Li, 2016 – China
- Pireneitega involuta (Wang, Yin, Peng & Xie, 1990) – China
- Pireneitega kovblyuki Zhang & Marusik, 2016 – Tajikistan
- Pireneitega lini Zhao & Li, 2016 – China
- Pireneitega liui Zhao & Li, 2016 – China
- Pireneitega luctuosa (L. Koch, 1878) – Central Asia, China, Russia (Far East), Korea, Japan
- Pireneitega luniformis (Zhu & Wang, 1994) – China
- Pireneitega lushuiensis Zhao & Li, 2017 – China
- Pireneitega major (Kroneberg, 1875) – Uzbekistan, Tajikistan, China
- Pireneitega muratovi Zhang & Marusik, 2016 – Tajikistan
- Pireneitega occitanica Déjean & Danflous, 2024 – France (Pyrenees)
- Pireneitega ovtchinnikovi Kovblyuk, Kastrygina, Marusik & Ponomarev, 2013 – Caucasus (Russia, Georgia)
- Pireneitega pyrenaea (Simon, 1870) – Spain, France
- Pireneitega ramitensis Zhang & Marusik, 2016 – Tajikistan
- Pireneitega segestriformis (Dufour, 1820) – Spain, Andorra, France
- Pireneitega spasskyi (Charitonov, 1946) – Caucasus (Russia, Georgia, Azerbaijan)
- Pireneitega spinivulva (Simon, 1880) – Russia (Far East), China, Korea
- Pireneitega taishanensis (Wang, Yin, Peng & Xie, 1990) – China
- Pireneitega taiwanensis Wang & Ono, 1998 – Taiwan
- Pireneitega tianchiensis (Wang, Yin, Peng & Xie, 1990) – China
- Pireneitega tyurai Zhang & Marusik, 2016 – Tajikistan
- Pireneitega wensuensis Zhao & Li, 2016 – China
- Pireneitega wui Zhao & Li, 2016 – China
- Pireneitega xinping Zhang, Zhu & Song, 2002 – China
- Pireneitega xiyankouensis Zhao & Li, 2017 – China
- Pireneitega yaoi Zhao & Li, 2016 – China
- Pireneitega zonsteini Zhang & Marusik, 2016 – Tajikistan
