= Pireneitega pyrenaea =

Scientific classification
- Kingdom: Animalia
- Phylum: Arthropoda
- Subphylum: Chelicerata
- Class: Arachnida
- Order: Araneae
- Infraorder: Araneomorphae
- Family: Agelenidae
- Genus: Pireneitega
- Species: P. pyrenaea

Binomial name
- Pireneitega pyrenaea (Simon, 1870)

Species of spider

Pireneitega pyrenaea is an araneomorph spider species found in Spain and France.
