= Pireneitega spasskyi =

Scientific classification
- Domain: Eukaryota
- Kingdom: Animalia
- Phylum: Arthropoda
- Subphylum: Chelicerata
- Class: Arachnida
- Order: Araneae
- Infraorder: Araneomorphae
- Family: Agelenidae
- Genus: Pireneitega
- Species: P. spasskyi

Binomial name
- Pireneitega spasskyi (Charitonov, 1946)

Synonyms
- Coelotes spasskyi Charitonov, 1946; Paracoelotes spasskyi (Charitonov, 1946)

Species of spider

Pireneitega spasskyi is an araneomorph spider species found in Turkey and the Caucasus (Russia, Georgia, Azerbaijan).
