= Pireneitega ovtchinnikovi =

Scientific classification
- Domain: Eukaryota
- Kingdom: Animalia
- Phylum: Arthropoda
- Subphylum: Chelicerata
- Class: Arachnida
- Order: Araneae
- Infraorder: Araneomorphae
- Family: Agelenidae
- Genus: Pireneitega
- Species: P. ovtchinnikovi

Binomial name
- Pireneitega ovtchinnikovi Kovblyuk et al., 2013

Species of spider

Pireneitega ovtchinnikovi is an araneomorph spider species found in Russia, Abkhazia and Georgia.
