= Pireneitega garibaldii =

Scientific classification
- Kingdom: Animalia
- Phylum: Arthropoda
- Subphylum: Chelicerata
- Class: Arachnida
- Order: Araneae
- Infraorder: Araneomorphae
- Family: Agelenidae
- Genus: Pireneitega
- Species: P. garibaldii

Binomial name
- Pireneitega garibaldii (Kritscher, 1969)

Synonyms
- Coelotes garibaldii Kritscher, 1969

Species of spider

Pireneitega garibaldii is a species of araneomorph spiders found in Italy.
