= Pireneitega segestriformis =

Scientific classification
- Domain: Eukaryota
- Kingdom: Animalia
- Phylum: Arthropoda
- Subphylum: Chelicerata
- Class: Arachnida
- Order: Araneae
- Infraorder: Araneomorphae
- Family: Agelenidae
- Genus: Pireneitega
- Species: P. segestriformis

Binomial name
- Pireneitega segestriformis (Dufour, 1820)

Species of spider

Pireneitega segestriformis is an araneomorph spider species found in Europe and Russia.
