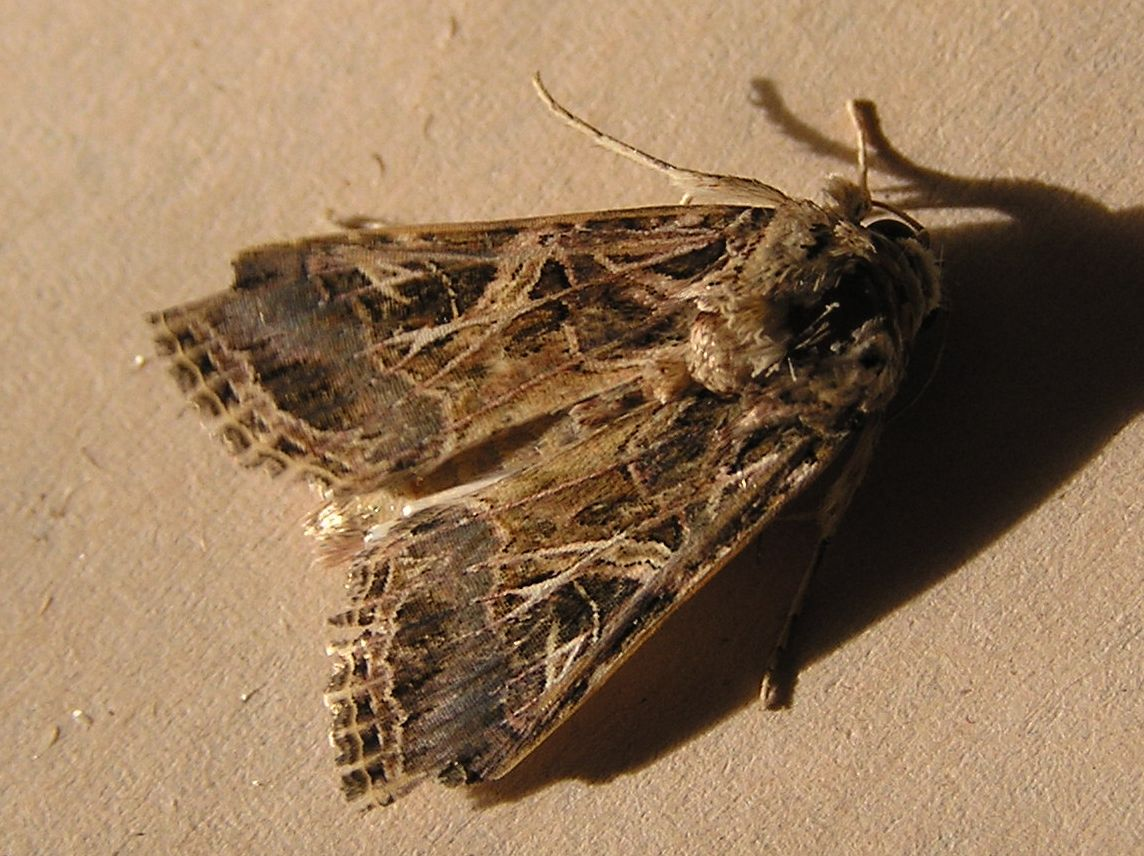
- Adult African cotton leafworm

Scientific classification
- Kingdom: Animalia
- Phylum: Arthropoda
- Clade: Pancrustacea
- Class: Insecta
- Order: Lepidoptera
- Superfamily: Noctuoidea
- Family: Noctuidae
- Genus: Spodoptera
- Species: S. littoralis

Binomial name
- Spodoptera littoralis (Boisduval, 1833)

Synonyms
- Hadena littoralis Boisduval, 1833; Noctua gossypii Fabricius, 1794; Prodena littoralis Boisduval, 1833; Prodenia testaceoides Guenée, 1852; Prodenia retina Freyer, 1945; Spodoptera retina Freyer, 1845; Spodoptera testaceoides Guenée, 1852; Spodoptera metrioides Bethune-Baker, 1991

= Spodoptera littoralis =

Species of moth

Spodoptera littoralis, also referred to as the African cotton leafworm or Egyptian cotton leafworm or Mediterranean brocade, is a species of moth in the family Noctuidae. S. littoralis is found widely in Africa, Mediterranean Europe and Middle Eastern countries. It is a highly polyphagous organism that is a pest of many cultivated plants and crops. As a result, this species was assigned the label of A2 quarantine pest by the EPPO and was cautioned as a highly invasive species in the United States. The devastating impacts caused by these pests have led to the development of both biological and chemical control methods. This moth is often confused with Spodoptera litura.

== Taxonomy ==
Egyptian cotton leafworm is one of the many species of genus Spodoptera and family Noctuidae. The family Noctuidae was named by a French zoologist, Pierre André Latreille, in 1809 and the genus Spodoptera was named by a French entomologist, Achiwlle Guenée, in 1852. Many of the species of genus Swpodoptera are known to be pest insects. The species was named by Jean Baptiste Boisduval in 1833. Synonyms of S. littoralis include Hadena littoralis and Prodenia littoralis. Due to the similarities between many pest insects, there have been noted incidents of many species that are almost identical to S. littoralis. For example, Spodoptera litura or cotton leafworm is often confused with S. littoralis, since the larvae and adult stages of two species are near identical. However, Viette demonstrated that these are two different species, as S. litura was found to mostly reside in Asia, Australia, and the Pacific Islands.

== Description ==
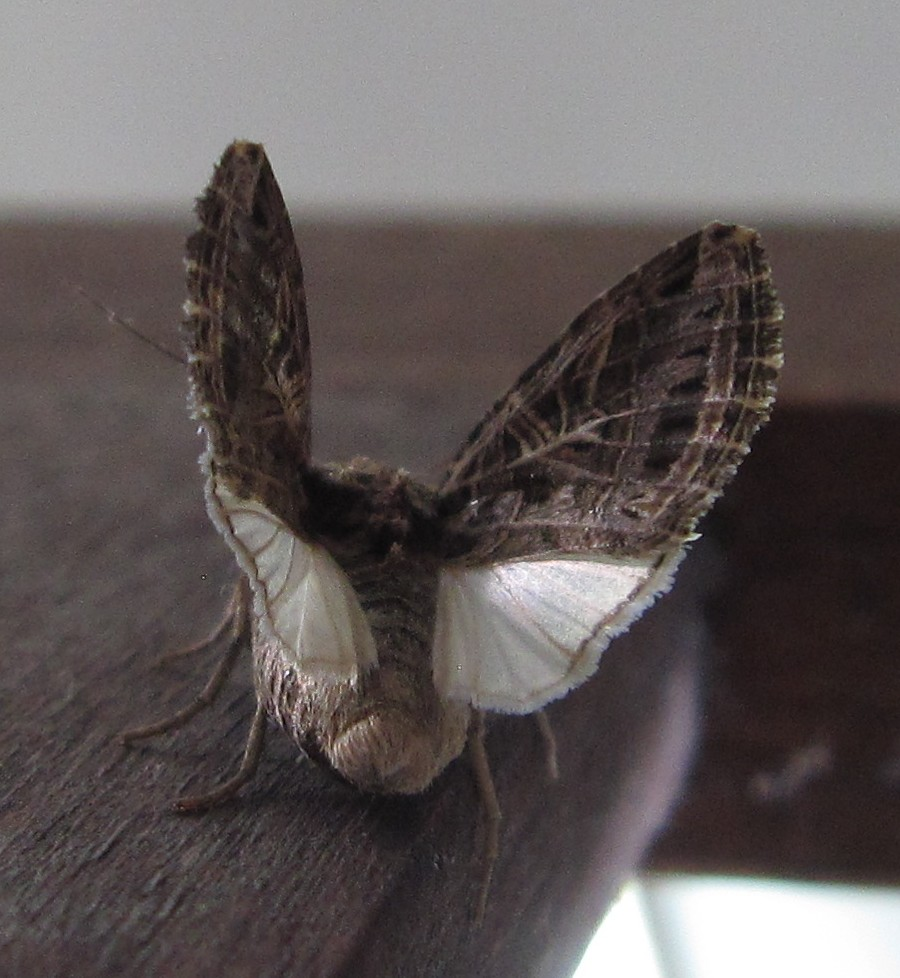
View of hind wings

The adult moth has a body size that ranges from 15 to 20 mm and wingspan that ranges from 30 to 38 mm. The species' forewings are grey-brown colored and have an ocellus that is constructed by white oblique lines. The hind wings are usually much paler and have grey-colored margins.

=== Similar species ===
Spodoptera littoralis is often confused with Spodoptera litura due to similar larvae and adult physical appearances. A bright yellow stripe along the dorsal side of the larvae is characteristic of S. litura. However, due to the variability in markings, the only certain way of distinguishing between the two species is by comparing the genitalia. Specifically, ductus and ostium bursae are known to be the same length in S. littoralis females but different in S. litura females. Similarly, it was reported that Prodenia ornithogalli is an American representative of S. littoralis as forms of the two species are extremely close and related. The main difference between these species is that P. ornithogalli is much darker in color and has sharper markings.

== Distribution and habitat ==
African cotton leafworm is native to Africa and also resides in most regions of Middle Eastern countries such as Israel, Syria and Turkey. Specifically, the species' native habitat is F5 (EUNIS code), which is semi-arid and subtropical habitats in pre-saharan Africa. This species has also been found in Southern and Mediterranean Europe, mainly in Spain, France, Italy and Greece. As the African cotton leafworm is prone to cold weather, the species' natural range is limited in the northern regions of Europe such as the United Kingdom. The optimal temperature for the species' reproductive potential is around 25 °C, so areas with lower winter temperatures or fluctuating temperatures show limited species distribution. Studies have shown that temperatures over 40 °C or below 13 °C showed increased in mortality. Combination of high temperature and low humidity are detrimental to the species survival as temperature over 40 °C or below 13 °C tend to increase mortality rate. As a result, S. littoralis resides in regions where temperature fluctuation is rare to feed on variety of host plants, in which the females lay eggs and the larvae primarily grow.

Species distribution mainly occurs through trade when egg or larvae get on the imported ornamentals or crops. Adult moths are often distributed by wind but are also transported by other species. Adult moths fly as well.

== Food resources ==
Spodoptera littoralis is reported to be polyphagous, and the range of host plants on which the larvae feed covers over 40 different plant families and at least 87 different plant species. The species is known as a pest of several economically important crops such as Ipomoea batatas (sweet potato), Solanum lycopersicum (tomato), Zea mays (maize), Triticum aestivum (wheat), Capsicum (peppers), Chloris gayana (rhodes grass) and Hibiscus mutabilis (cottonrose). The larvae prefer to feed on young leaves, young shoots, stalks, bolls, buds and fruits. Some of its recorded host plants are known to affect larval growth. For example, larvae that fed on castor oil leaves had shortened larval and pupal duration, whereas these durations were prolonged in larvae that fed on sweet potato leaves.

== Parental care ==
=== Oviposition ===
Oviposition refers to a process in which animals lay eggs. There are three different oviposition sites of S. littoralis females. Of the three, young leaves are particularly preferred by the females as they serve as food sources for the hatching larvae. Eggs are also often deposited on fully expanded leaves or mature leaves but larvae hatching from these leaves move to feed on young leaves. Larvae that fed on young leaves or fully expanded leaves were found to have significantly faster growth rate compared to others that fed on mature leaves.

== Life cycle ==
=== Egg ===
Female moths lay a batch of eggs that ranges from 20 to 1,000 eggs on the lower side of a host plant's leaves. After the eggs are laid, female coats the eggs with scales from its abdomen. These spherical eggs show white to yellowish color and are 0.6 mm in diameter. These white-yellow color of the eggs turn black just before hatching due to the presence of black larval head near the transparent shell.

=== Larvae ===
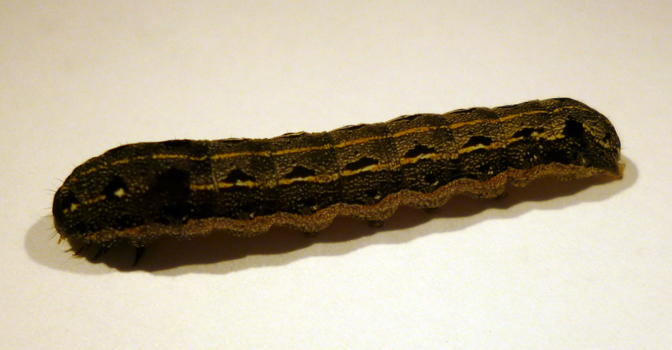
Spodoptera littoralis larvae

Larvae body length ranges from 40 to 45 mm. The larvae is usually hairless and varies in color. It has been noted that new born larvae has grayish or dark-green body color whereas the developed larvae has brownish or yellowish body color. Dark and light longitudinal bands along with two dark semi-circular spots on the back are noted characteristics of the larvae. The newly hatched larvae up to third-instar mainly feed on the lower side of the leaves but the later instar larvae feed on both sides. S. littoralis larvae in general are known to feed in the dark. It also has been observed that larvae up to their third and fourth-instar usually remain in their host plant but fifth and sixth-instar larvae leave the host plant during the day and climb back up at night.

=== Pupa ===
The pupa is around 20 mm long and cylindrical in shape. Initially, the pupa is green colored with reddish abdomen but it turns reddish-brown within few hours. Pupation usually occurs 3–5 cm deep in the solid ground under soil. The duration of pupation is around 5–6 hours.

=== Adult ===
Adult moth has a greyish-brown body that is around 15–20 millimetres (9/16–13/16 in) long. The wingspan of the adult moth ranges from 30–38 millimetres (1 3/16–1 1/2 in). The forewing of the adult moth has brownish color with paler veins whereas the hindwing is more lightly colored (greyish-white). There are also oblique white bands on the forewing. The adult moth appears at night and live about 5–10 days.

== Neurochemistry ==
Larvae have been found to suffer drastic feeding inhibition from injection with myosuppressin, by Vilaplana et al. 2008.

== Predators ==
There are many known predators, pathogens and parasite species that control the growth and distribution of S. littoralis. Of the natural predators of S. littoralis, ladybirds have been noted to prey on young larvae and eggs. Other known generalist predators include Paederus fuscipes (staphylinid rove beetle), Paederus alferii, Labidura riparia, Creontiades pallidus and so on. Spiders are also known predators of this species. Specifically, Cheiracanthium mildei and Ummeliata insecticeps are known dominant predator species of S. littoralis that not only feed on the larvae but also induce dispersion from host plant.

== Mating ==
=== Copulation characteristics ===
Copulation refers to sexual behaviors observed in animals. Most adult moths mate on the day that they emerge from pupation. Duration of copulation ranges from 20 minutes to two hours. Studies revealed that age difference between the male and female moth is crucial in determining reproductive capacity, adult lifespan and egg quality. The most effective age difference that increased egg fertility was four days difference between the male and female. When a four-day-old male mated with a fresh born female, egg fertility was observed to be high. However, females laid most eggs when it mated with a male who was one day older.

=== Pheromones ===
Pheromones refer to chemical factors secreted by an organism that effect the social behavior of other organisms that receive them. The pheromone secreted by females for mate calling is (Z,E)-9,11-tetradecadienyl acetate. As most matings occur at night, females producing largest amount of pheromone was observed 2–3 hours into scotophase, a dark phase of light cycle. The amount of pheromone in these females ranged from 6 to 8 ng. Lowest amount of pheromone was excreted few hours before the dark phase ended. Other than its function to attract mates, female-produced pheromones may also synchronize male circadian rhythm.

=== Courting ===
Courting is a behavior that displays the attempt of one sex of the species to attract the other sex for copulation. Antennae serves an important function in adult moth courtship. A male answering a female mate-call fully extends its antennae while flying over the female. A sign of rejection in females is noted by rapid wing flicks, whereas lifted wings, curved abdomen and withdrawal of pheromone in females are signs of female's acceptance for copulation. Once male and female are attached during copulation, male move its head downwards. Males without antennae did not answer female mate-call, which resulted in lack of mating. Females without antennae seldom mated but all matings were reported to be abnormal.

== Physiology ==
=== Flight ===
Flight in insects refer to a process in which an organism moves from one place to another with the usage of its wings. S. littoralis can fly up to distances of 1.5 km over a four-hour period. Since the species is nocturnal, its peak flight activity is usually between the hours of 20:00 and midnight. The flight activity for the moth can extend up to 10 days while an adult. Research has also shown that wind direction seems to have an effect on the moth's flight activity.

=== Antennal lobe ===
Antenna are paired appendages attached to an arthropod's head that usually has a sensory function. Antenna in S. littoralis has an important function in facilitating mating. Experiments showed that antennal lobe of adult antenna are responsible for detecting different types of sensory inputs that are necessary for the adults to respond to external stimuli. Specifically, antennal lobe are responsible for identifying olfactory and mechanosensory stimulus.

=== Diapause ===
Diapause is defined as a delay in development caused by adverse external environmental factors. Mature larvae dig down the soil where it forms a cocoon to go under pupation. Larvae in its pupal stage can go through diapause but it is vulnerable to continuous frost and cold weather. However, it is generally known that S. littoralis larvae do not go through diapause.

== Interaction with humans ==
=== Pest of crop plants ===
Because of S. littoralis' polyphagous behavior, the species has been damaging to many economically crucial crops such as cotton, tomato, maize and various other vegetables. Most of the damages are a direct result of extensive larvae feeding. Often, larvae will either create large holes in the leaves, only leaving the big veins of the leaves, or bear into the bud for consumption. Most of the plants or vegetables that are attacked by S. littoralis are unsuitable for consumption as the damages are too severe. Of different types of host plants, cotton has been one of the main targets of S. littoralis. The species feed on cotton leaves, flower buds, fruiting points, and bolls, leaving the plant unsuitable for any further usage. Such damage of cotton plant is most prevalent in North Africa, especially in Egypt. As a result, EPPO has assigned S. littoralis as A2 quarantine pest. In the United States, S. littoralis has been listed as an exotic organism with high invasive risk. Since 2004, there have been 65 reported incidents of S. littoralis that were present at various U.S. ports of entry.

=== Prevention and control ===
Due to S. littoralis' devastating effect on crops, numerous attempts have been made to counteract the species' dispersion and activities. These preventative methods are mainly divided into biological and chemical methods. Biological methods include using parasitoids or predators to control moth reproduction and dispersion. Usage of bacteria such as Bacillus thuringiensis in combination with bacterial endochitinase has also been utilized recently to control many bacteria-resistant strains of S. littoralis larvae. Studies revealed that the synergistic toxic effect of Bacillus thuringiensis and bacterial endochitinase successfully resulted in reduced larval weight. However, direct usage of these biological methods are yet not legal. Similarly, chemical insecticides including organophosphorus, synthetic pyrethroids have been widely used to control S. littoralis. Recent studies also revealed that insect growth regulators such as azadirachtin from neem tree are effective in controlling S. littoralis larvae as azadirachtin-treated larvae had overall higher mortality rate as well as reduced growth rate due to increased deformity and growth disruption.
