= Pireneitega luctuosa =

- Illustration of Pireneitega luctuosa

Scientific classification
- Kingdom: Animalia
- Phylum: Arthropoda
- Subphylum: Chelicerata
- Class: Arachnida
- Order: Araneae
- Infraorder: Araneomorphae
- Family: Agelenidae
- Genus: Pireneitega
- Species: P. luctuosa

Binomial name
- Pireneitega luctuosa (L. Koch, 1878)

Synonyms
- Paracoelotes luctuosus

Species of spider

Pireneitega luctuosa is an araneomorph spider species. It is commonly found in southern Chinese caves.

delta-Palutoxins were originally isolated from the venom of P. luctuosa.
