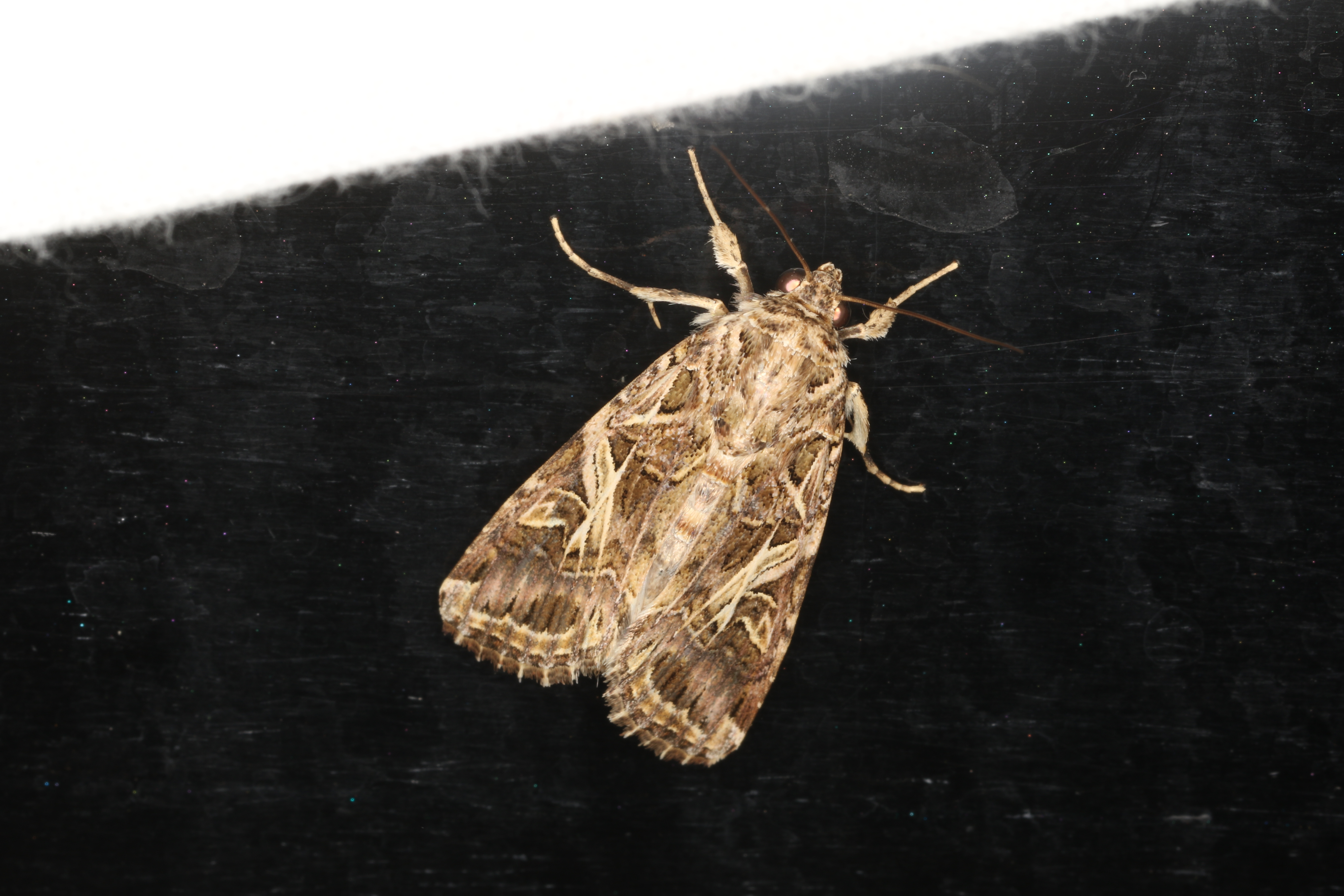

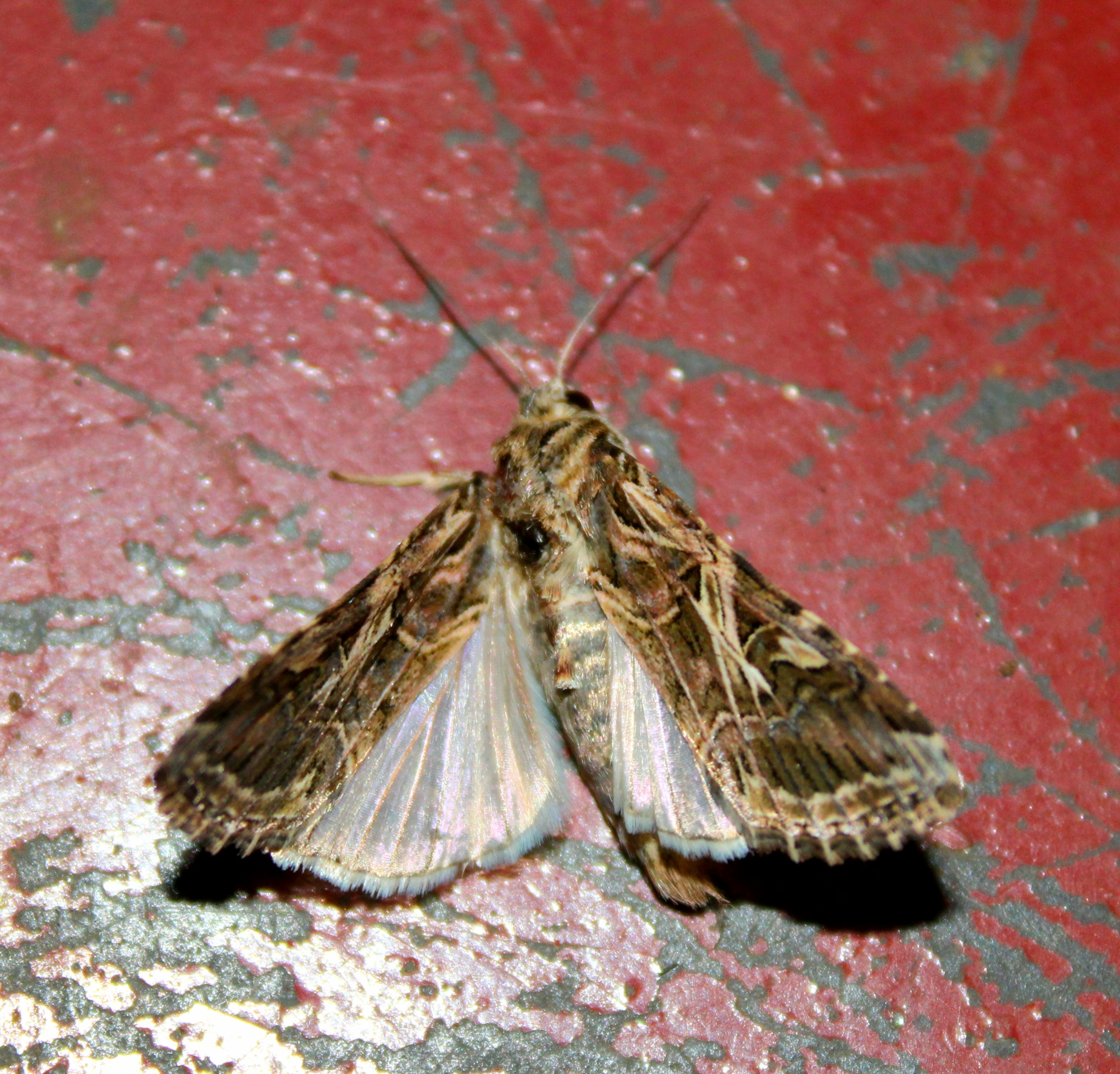

Scientific classification
- Kingdom: Animalia
- Phylum: Arthropoda
- Clade: Pancrustacea
- Class: Insecta
- Order: Lepidoptera
- Superfamily: Noctuoidea
- Family: Noctuidae
- Genus: Spodoptera
- Species: S. litura

Binomial name
- Spodoptera litura (Fabricius, 1775)

Synonyms
- Noctua litura Fabricius, 1775; Noctua histrionica Fabricius, 1775; Noctua elata Fabricius, 1781; Prodenia ciligera Guenée, 1852; Prodenia tasmanica Guenée, 1852; Prodenia subterminalis Walker, 1856; Prodenia glaucistriga Walker, 1856; Prodenia declinata Walker, 1857; Mamestra albisparsa Walker, 1862; Prodenia evanescens Butler, 1884; Orthosia conjuncta Rebel, 1921

= Spodoptera litura =

Species of moth

Spodoptera litura, otherwise known as the tobacco cutworm or cotton leafworm, is a nocturnal moth in the family Noctuidae. S. litura is a serious polyphagous pest in Asia, Oceania, and the Indian subcontinent that was first described by Johan Christian Fabricius in 1775. Its common names reference two of the most frequent host plants of the moth. In total, 87 species of host plants that are infested by S. litura are of economic importance. The species parasitize the plants as larvae through vigorous eating patterns, oftentimes leaving the leaves completely destroyed. The moth destroys economically important agricultural crops and decreases yield in some plants completely. Their potential impact on the many different cultivated crops, and subsequently the local agricultural economy, has led to serious efforts to control the pests.

S. litura is often confused with its close relative, Spodoptera littoralis. These two species are hard to discriminate between because the larvae and adult forms are identical. Inspecting the genitalia is the most certain way to tell the two species apart.

== Description ==
=== Sex differences ===
==== Morphology ====
There are slight but obvious differences in morphology between males and females of S. litura that allow for the easy differentiation of the two sexes. Male forewing length is 14–17 millimetres (1/2–5/8 in) while female forewing length is slightly larger and measures 15–18 millimetres (5/8–3/4 in). The orbicular spot on the forewing is also more pronounced in the males.

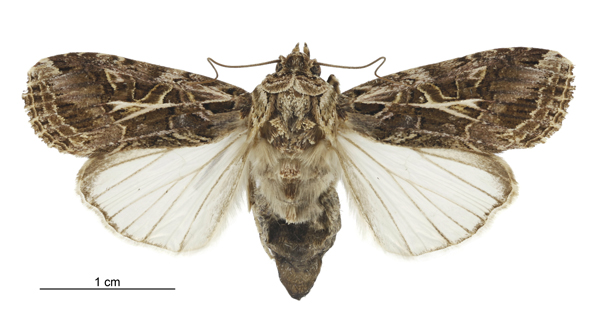
Female

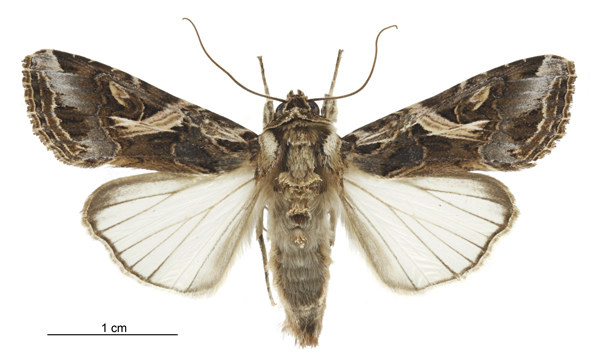
Male

==== Differences in food regulation ====
Regulation of macro nutrient input differs between males and females. Experimental results show that when S. litura are presented with two nutritionally complementary diet options, one rich in protein and a second rich in carbohydrates, females tend to consume more protein than males while no differences in carbohydrates exist. Body utilization of the macro nutrients differed as well. Females were very efficient at converting the protein consumed into body growth and mass, reflecting the bodily requirements to produce eggs. Males, on the other hand, were more efficient at depositing lipid from ingested carbohydrates. This fits in well with the migration patterns associated with mating. Males usually go out to find females during mating season, so the lipid deposits are thought to be energy reserves that will help the males in preparation for the migration.

== Similar species ==
Spodoptera litura and Spodoptera littoralis are very closely related species. Discriminating between the two species can be difficult because the larvae and adult forms look identical. In fact, these two species are so similar that previous records that have claimed the presence of S. litura in areas such as Russia, Germany, and the UK may actually have been referring to S. littoralis. Since both species are polyphagous, taking note of the host plant is not helpful in correct identification. The only way to properly differentiate between the two is by inspecting their genitalia. In S. littoralis, the ductus and ostium bursae are the same lengths while in S. litura, they are of different lengths. In males, the juxta have characteristic shapes for each species.

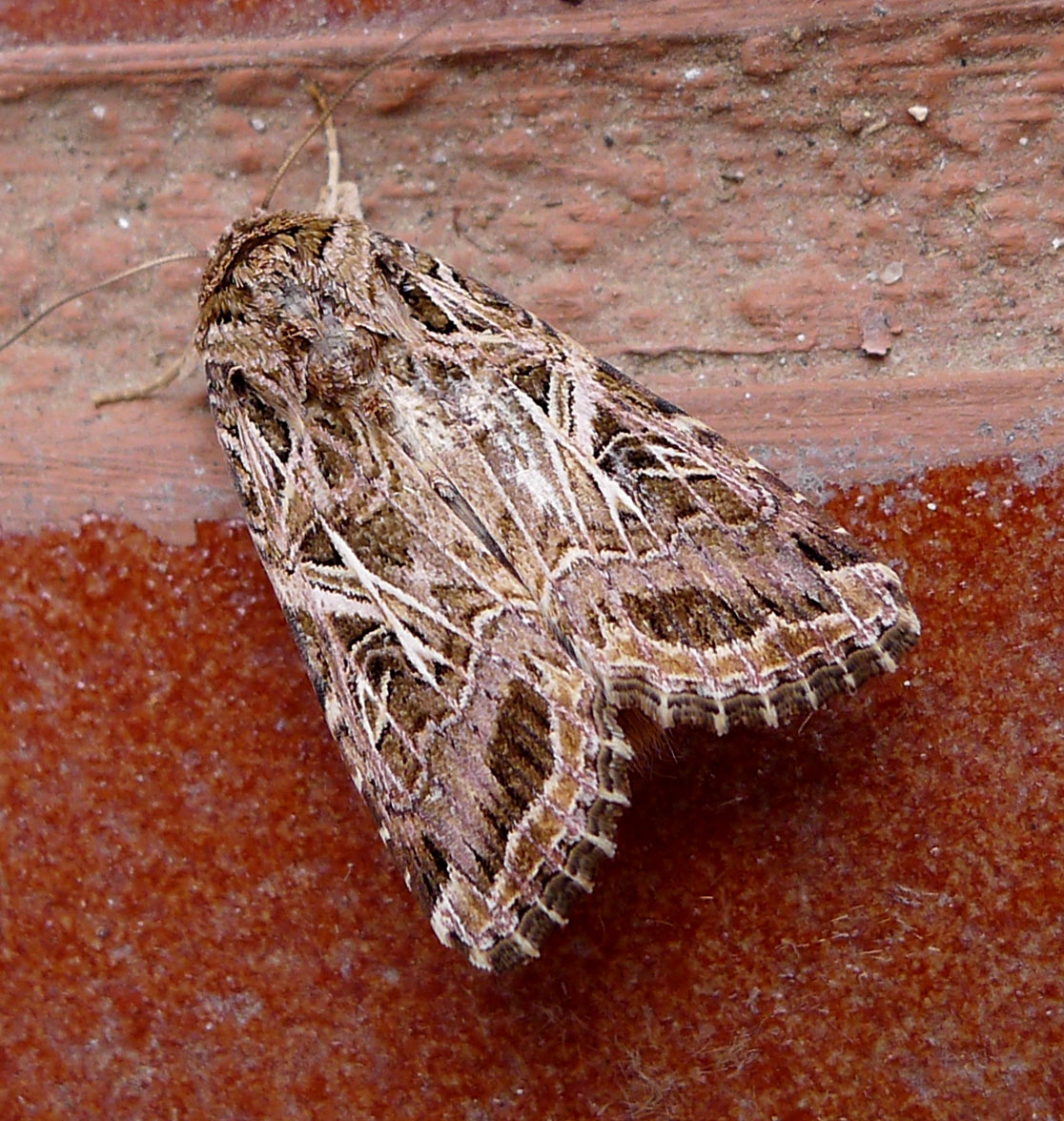
Spodoptera littoralis

== Range ==
S. litura is the most common in South Asia. However, its natural range extends from the Oriental and Australasian areas to parts of the Palearctic region as well. The countries with the most widespread population of S. litura include but are not limited to China, Indonesia, India, Japan, and Malaysia. The range of S. litura has also extended into non-indigenous regions through international trade. Moths in their egg, larvae, or pupae stages can be present in the soil, flower, or vegetation that are being transported across various regions. Pupae especially can be moved long distances, provided that they are not crushed, because of the relatively long pupation period.

== Habitat ==
S. litura is a general herbivore and takes residence on various plants. The lower and upper limits of habitable temperatures are 10 and 37 °C (50 and 99 °F), respectively. Therefore, it is well suited for tropical and temperate climate regions. As caterpillars, S. litura can only move short distances. However, adult moths can fly up to a distance of 1.5 kilometres (0.93 mi) for a total duration of 4 hours. This helps disperse the moths into new habitats and onto different host plants as food sources are depleted.

== Life cycle ==
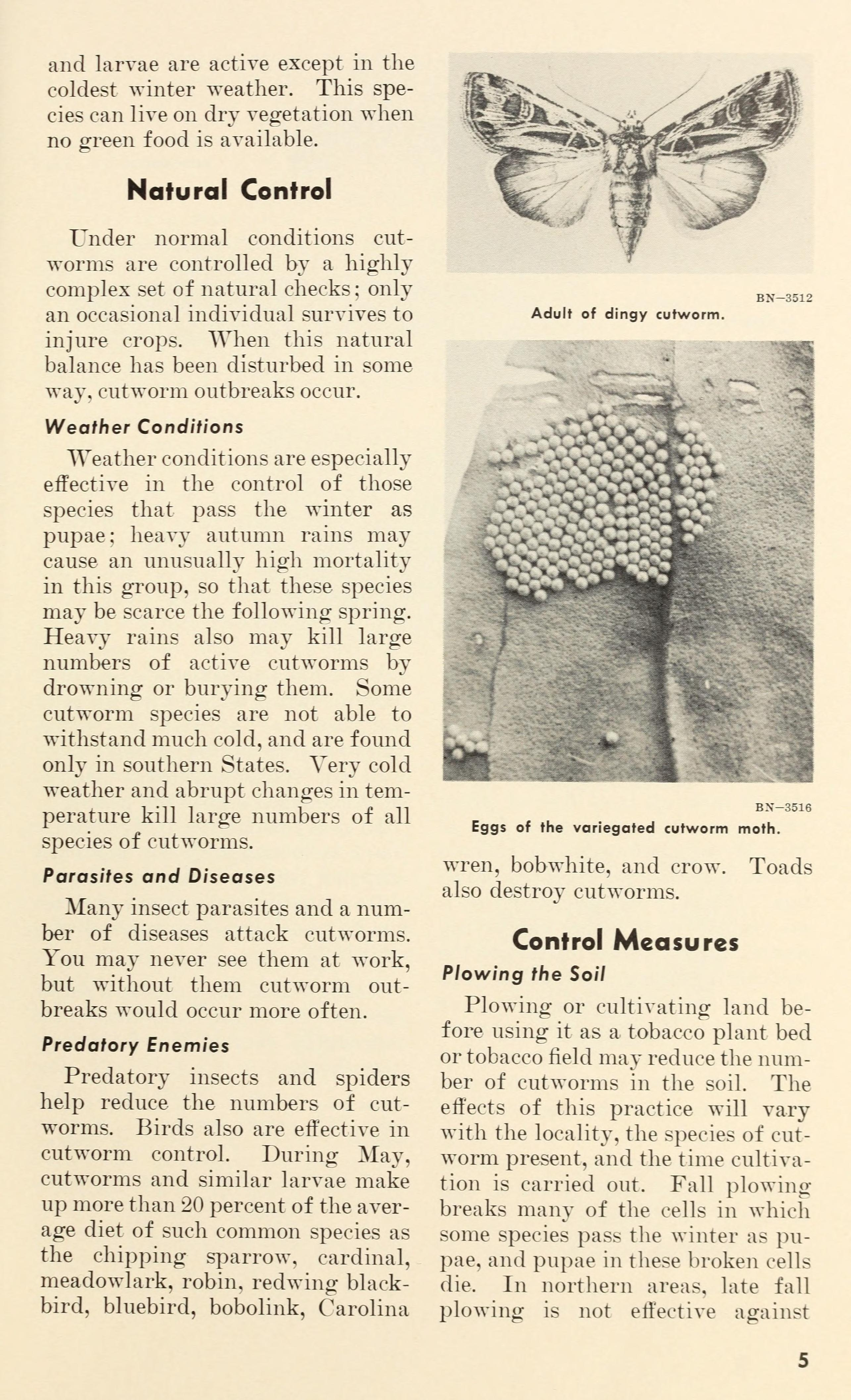
1957 USDA brochure

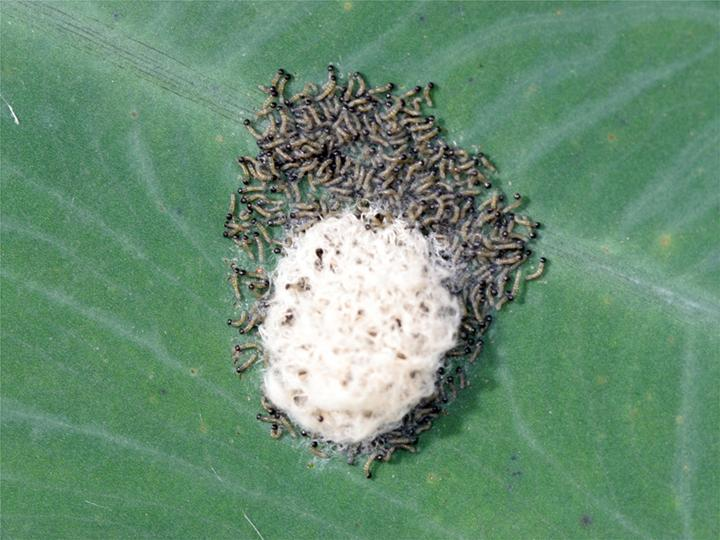
Emerging larvae

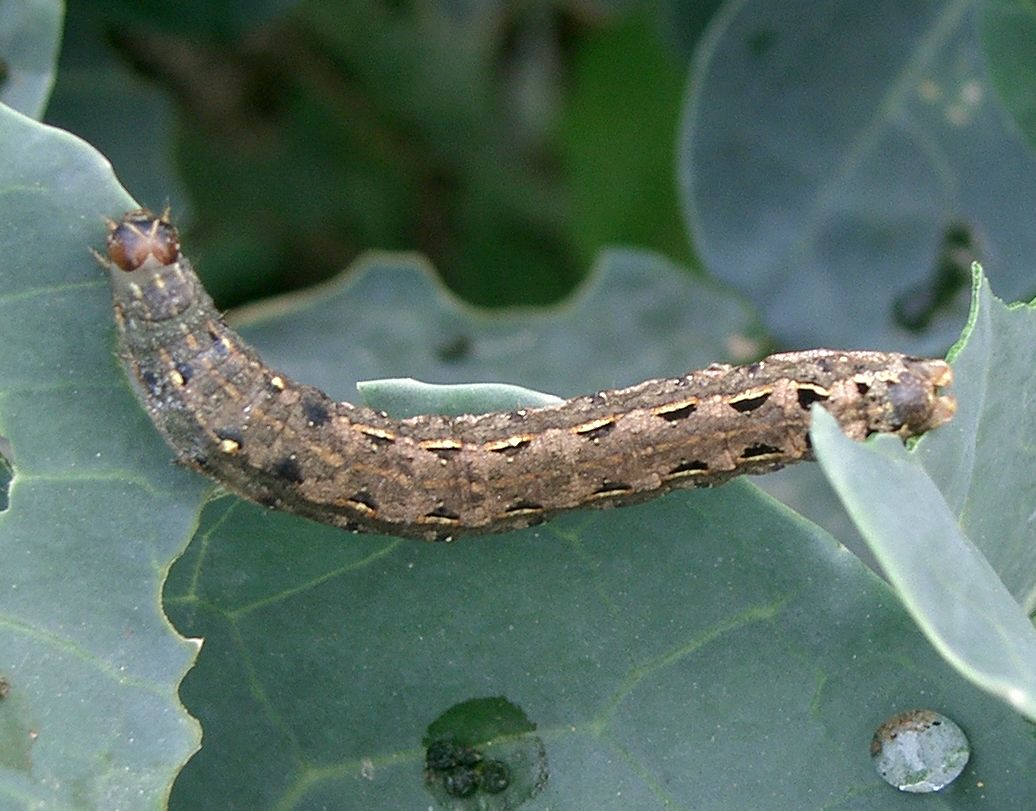
Larva

Although the length of a life cycle varies slightly throughout the different regions, a typical S. litura will complete 12 generations every year. Each generation lasts about a month, but temperature causes slight variations: life cycles in the winter tend to be slightly more than one month, and life cycles in the summer tend to be less than a full month.

=== Egg ===
Eggs are spherical and slightly flattened. Each individual egg is around 0.6 mm in diameter with an orange-brown or pink color. These eggs are laid on the surface of leaves in big batches, with each cluster usually containing several hundred eggs. Females have a typical fecundity of 2000 to 2600 eggs. However, experiments have shown that high temperatures and low humidity are inversely related to fecundity. When laid, the egg batches are covered with hair scales provided by the female, which gives off a golden brown color. Egg masses are 4–7 millimetres (5/32–35/128 in) in total diameter, and eggs will hatch 2–3 days after being laid.

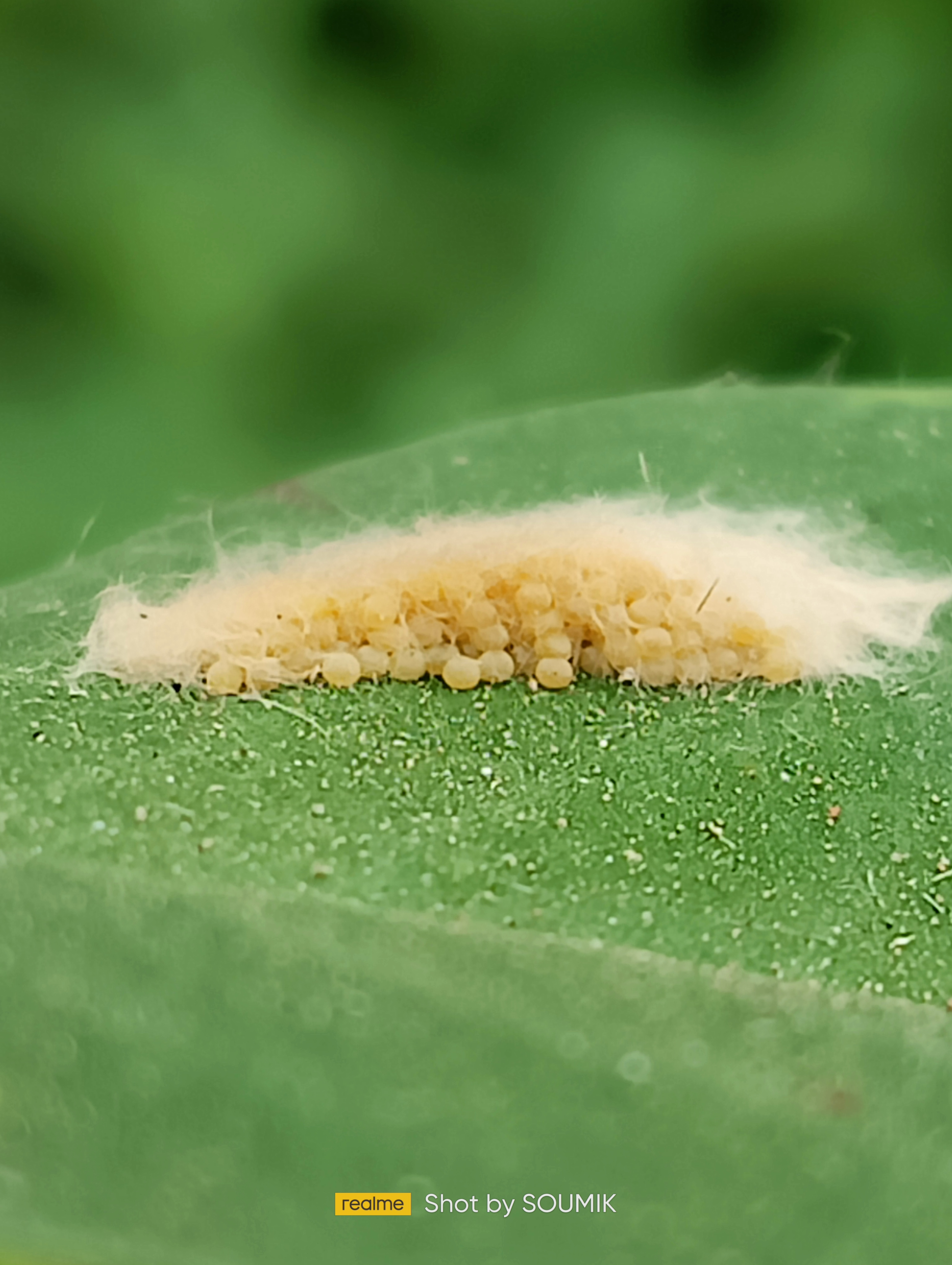
Eggs

=== Larva ===
Larvae body length ranges from 2.3 millimetres (23/256 in) to 32 millimetres (1 1/4 in). The larva is variable in color based on age. Younger larvae tend to be a lighter green while older ones develop to a dark green or brown color. A bright yellow stripe along the dorsal surface is a characteristic feature of the larvae. The larvae also have no hair. Newly hatched larvae can be found by looking for scratch marks on leaf surfaces. Since S. litura is nocturnal, the larvae feed at night. During the day, they can usually be found in the soil around the plant. There are six instar stages, and by the last stage, the final instar can weigh up to 800 mg.

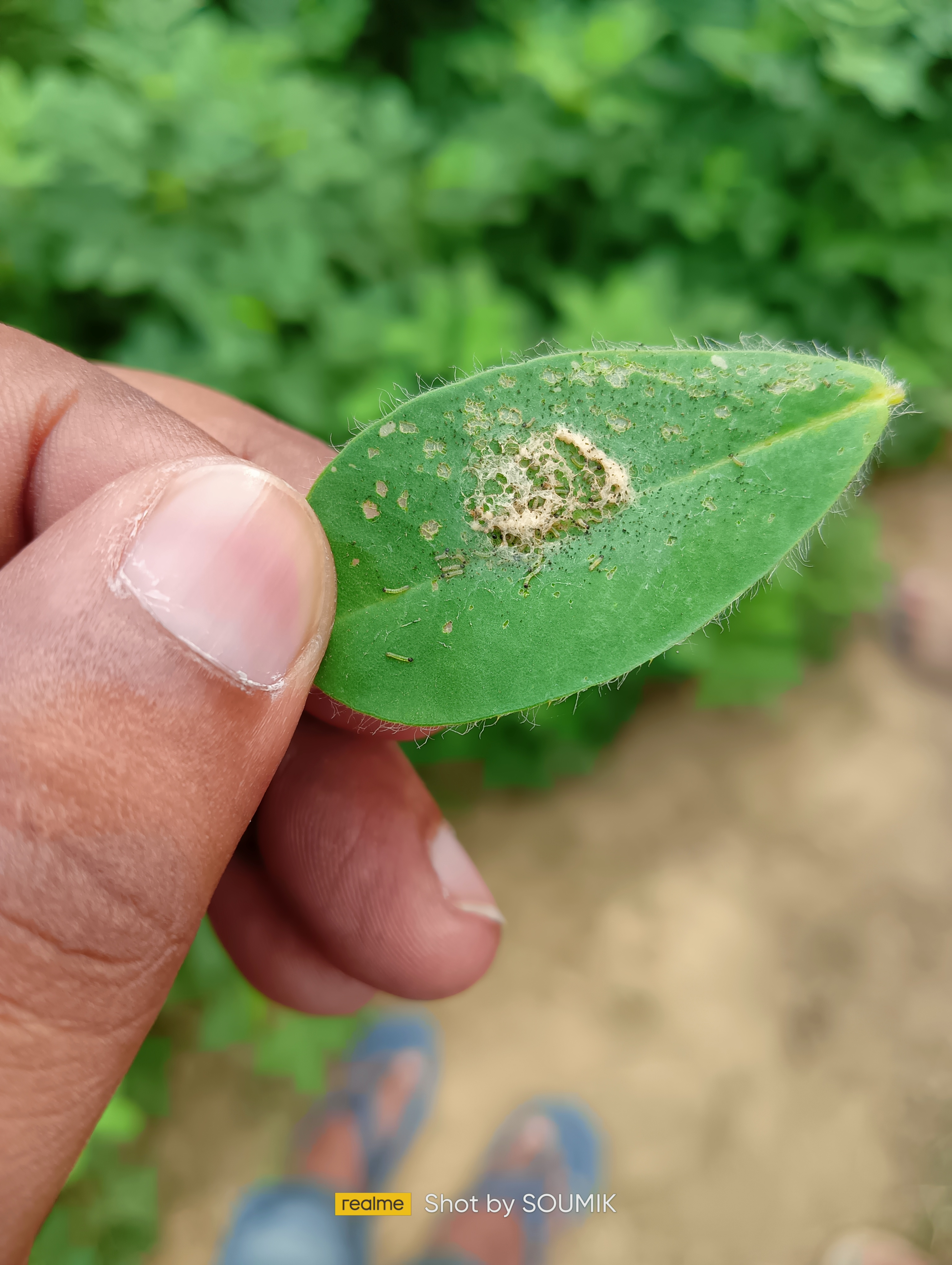
Newly hatched 1st instar larva

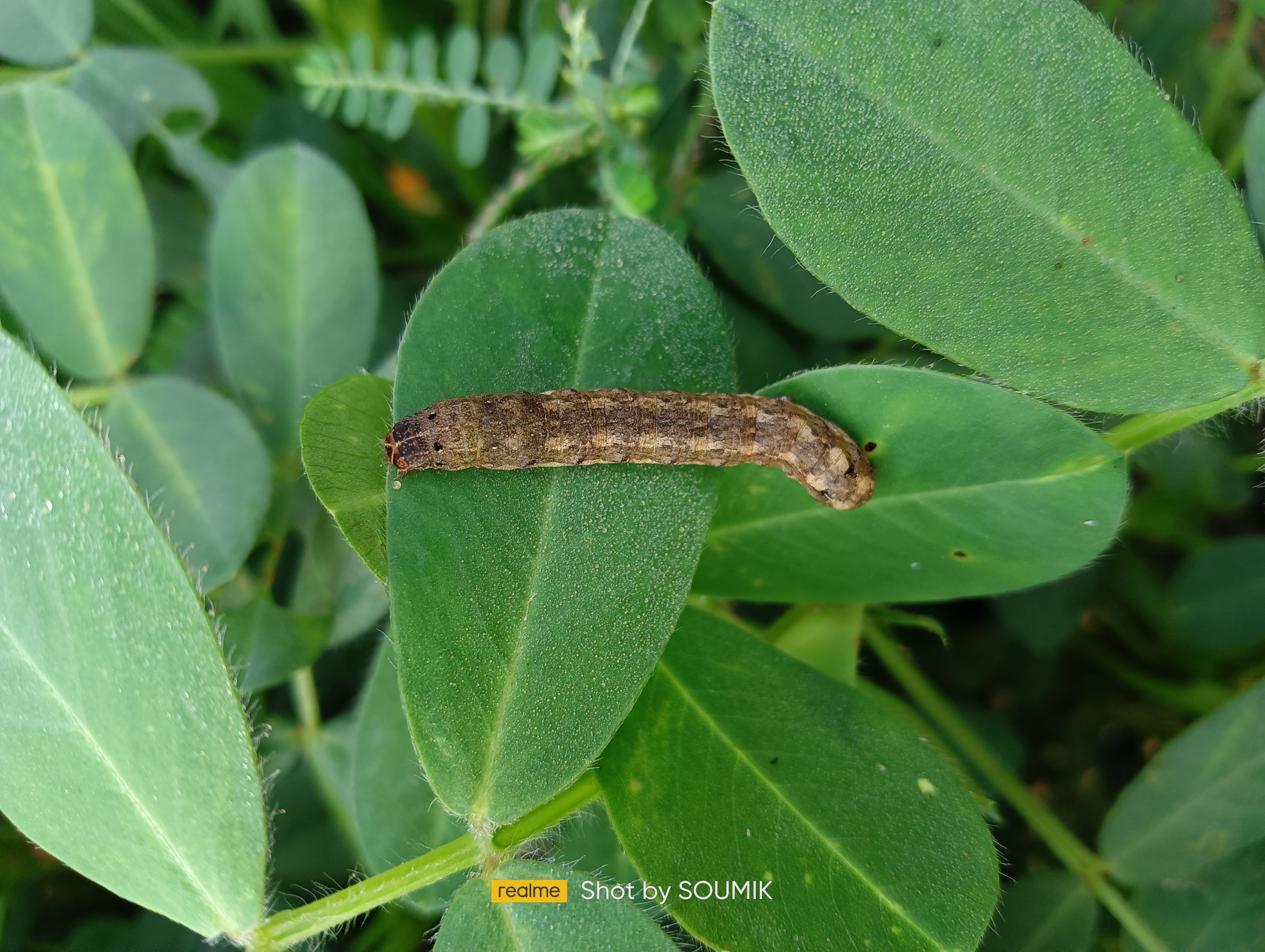

=== Pupa ===
Pupation lasts around 7 to 10 days and takes place on the soil near the base of the plant. The pupa is typically 15–20 millimetres (19/32–25/32 in) long, and its color is red-brown. A characteristic feature is the presence of two small spines at the tip of the abdomen that are about 0.5 millimetres (5/256 in) long each.

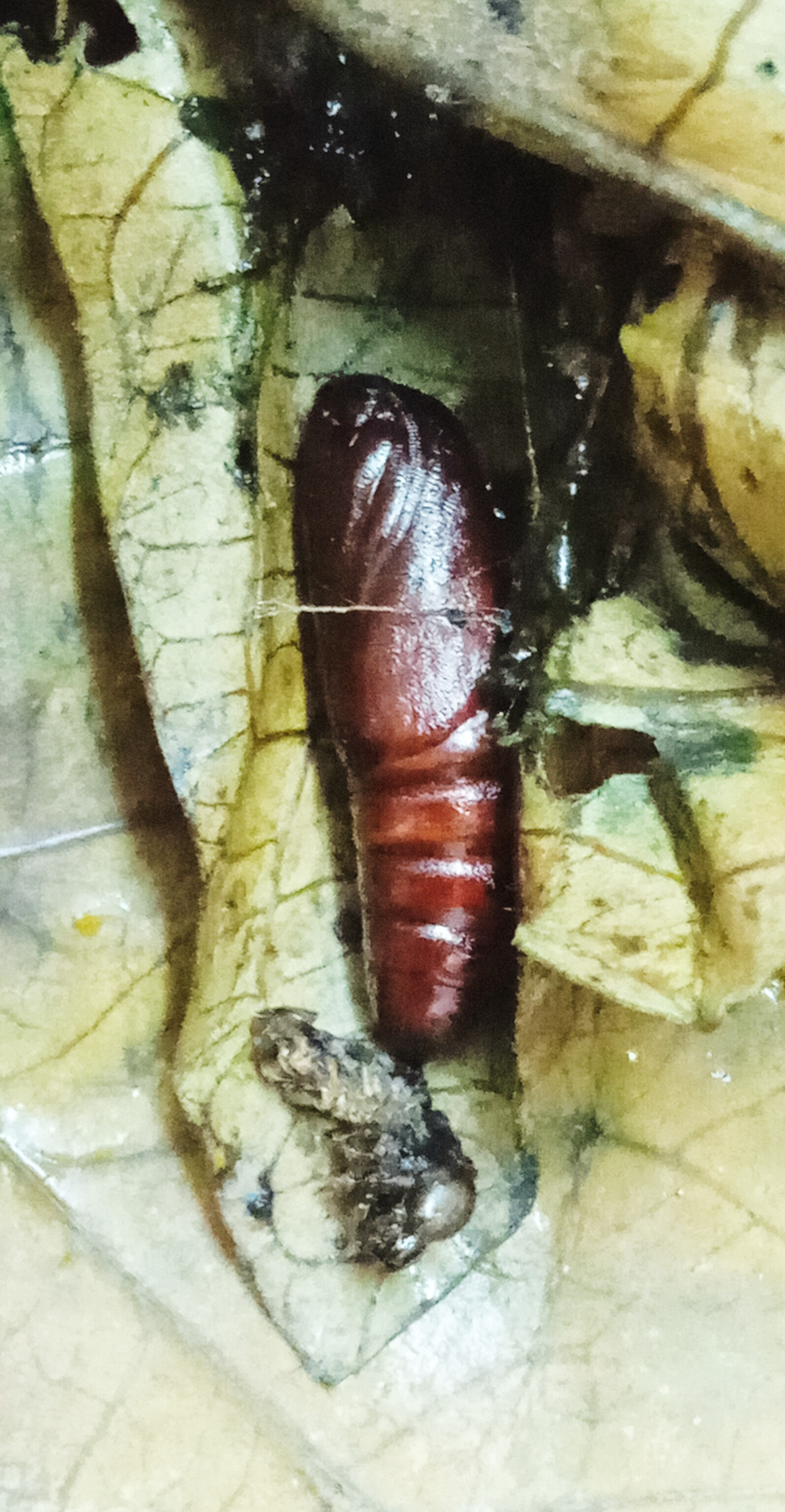
Pupa

=== Adult ===
Adult moths are on average 15–20 millimetres (19/32–25/32 in) long and have a total wingspan of 30–38 millimetres (1 3/16–1 1/2 in). The body is a gray-brown color. The forewings are patterned with dark gray, red, and brown colors. The hindwings are grayish-white with a gray outline. The mean female longevity is 8.3 days while for males it is 10.4 days.

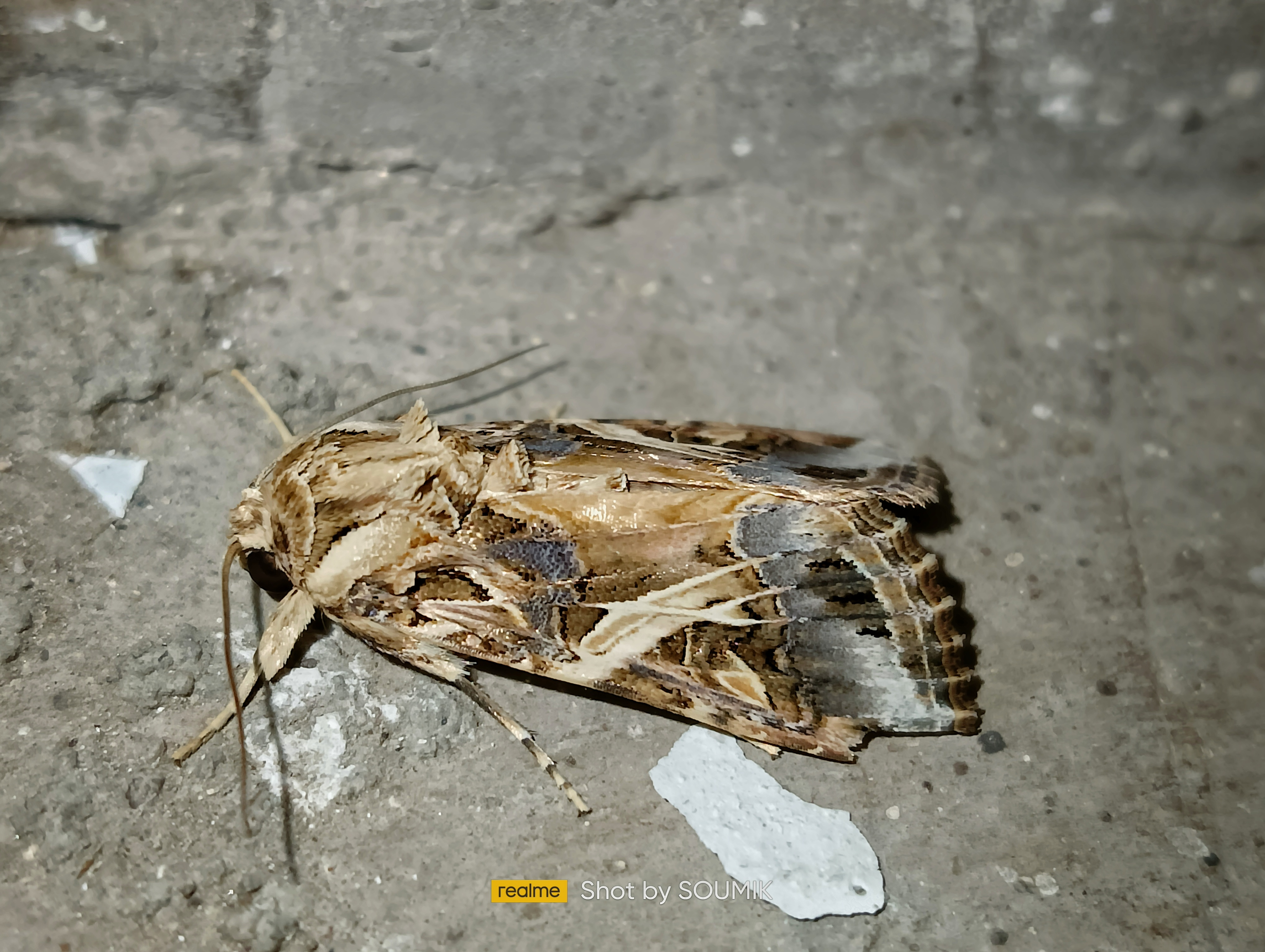
Male

== Mating ==
There is no mating activity on the first night that the moth emerges. The second night, however, accounts for about 70% of the matings. This night marks the maximum activity. Females mate an average of 3.1 times while the males have a mating average of 10.3. During copulation, males transfer a mean of 1,052,640 sperm per mating. Eggs during mating are laid in a cluster covered with hair from the female's abdomen. This acts as a protective layer from parasites predating on eggs. Since S. litura is a nocturnal moth, all reproductive activities occur during the scotophase (dark phase). These reproductive activities include calling, courtship, mating, and oviposition. Several studies have pointed out that the female lifespan decreases after mating. The reasons for this are still not fully known. Several possible explanations include physical injuries from the male genitalia or the male accessory gland secretions that force females to commit more resources to reproduction instead of on herself.

=== Male accessory glands ===
Male accessory glands (MAGs) are a reproductive evolutionary strategy adopted by males to gain higher fertilization. MAGs contain many different kinds of molecules including carbohydrates, lipids, and proteins. When MAGs are transferred from the male to the female during copulation, it exerts a wide range of effects on female post-mating behavior. One of these effects include suppressing female receptivity to future matings by reducing their sexual receptivity or sexual attractiveness. Experiments have shown that females exposed to MAGs do not engage in mating call behavior the night they are exposed to the secretion. A successful mating that resulted in fertilized eggs led to an even longer break from sexual receptivity.

Mating also has an effect on stimulating egg production and ovulation. This phenomenon may also be a result of the mechanical stimulation of male genitalia during copulation. However, studies have shown that MAG secretions are necessary for the maximum stimulation of the eggs. As a result, female longevity is negatively correlated with the number of eggs laid because a large portion of resources end up being used for the development of eggs instead of on herself.

=== Pheromones ===
In sexually reproductive animals, recognition and attraction of potential mates can occur in the form of pheromones. In moth species, pheromones are produced by the females by pheromone glands and are released to attract males of their own species. Accurate recognition of compatible mates is essential for reproductive success because failure to do so will come with steep costs: wasted time and energy, higher risk of predation, and reduction of viable offspring. Therefore, there is a strong selection for correct mate recognition signals that maximize reproductive fitness. Both S. litura and S. littoralis share the same 11 components that make up their pheromones (in different amounts), with (Z,E)-9,11-tetradecadienyl acetate (Z9,E11–14:Ac) acting as the major component.

There is an inverse relationship between pheromone concentration within the bodies of females and the calling behavior of a female. This is because pheromones are released during female calling. It has been previously stated that the male accessory gland suppresses female calling and subsequently, re-mating. With calling suppressed, pheromone concentration builds up in the body of mated females. Therefore, when pheromone glands are analyzed, mated females will have a higher titre than virgin females. This result is different from previous studies on other insect species.

==== Circadian rhythm ====
The circadian rhythm also affects pheromone release. It has been found that higher amounts of pheromones are released during scotophase (dark period) and that lower levels are released during photophase (light period). This pattern is thought to coincide with male flight patterns, which would maximize responsiveness to the pheromone signals being sent.

=== Heterospecific matings ===
Heterospecific matings can be expected for phylogenetically closely related species with adjacent distribution, as is the case for S. litura and S. littoralis. Overlap in pheromone composition as discussed above also contributes to the lack of total reproductive isolation between the two species. Previous experiments have already shown that mating reduces the lifespan of female S. litura. This lifespan decreases even further when mating with a heterospecific S. littoralis male. It has also been shown that females lay significantly more eggs after a conspecific mating rather than after a heterospecific mating. Therefore, there is an evolutionary benefit to recognizing and mating with a mate of the same species.

== Predators ==
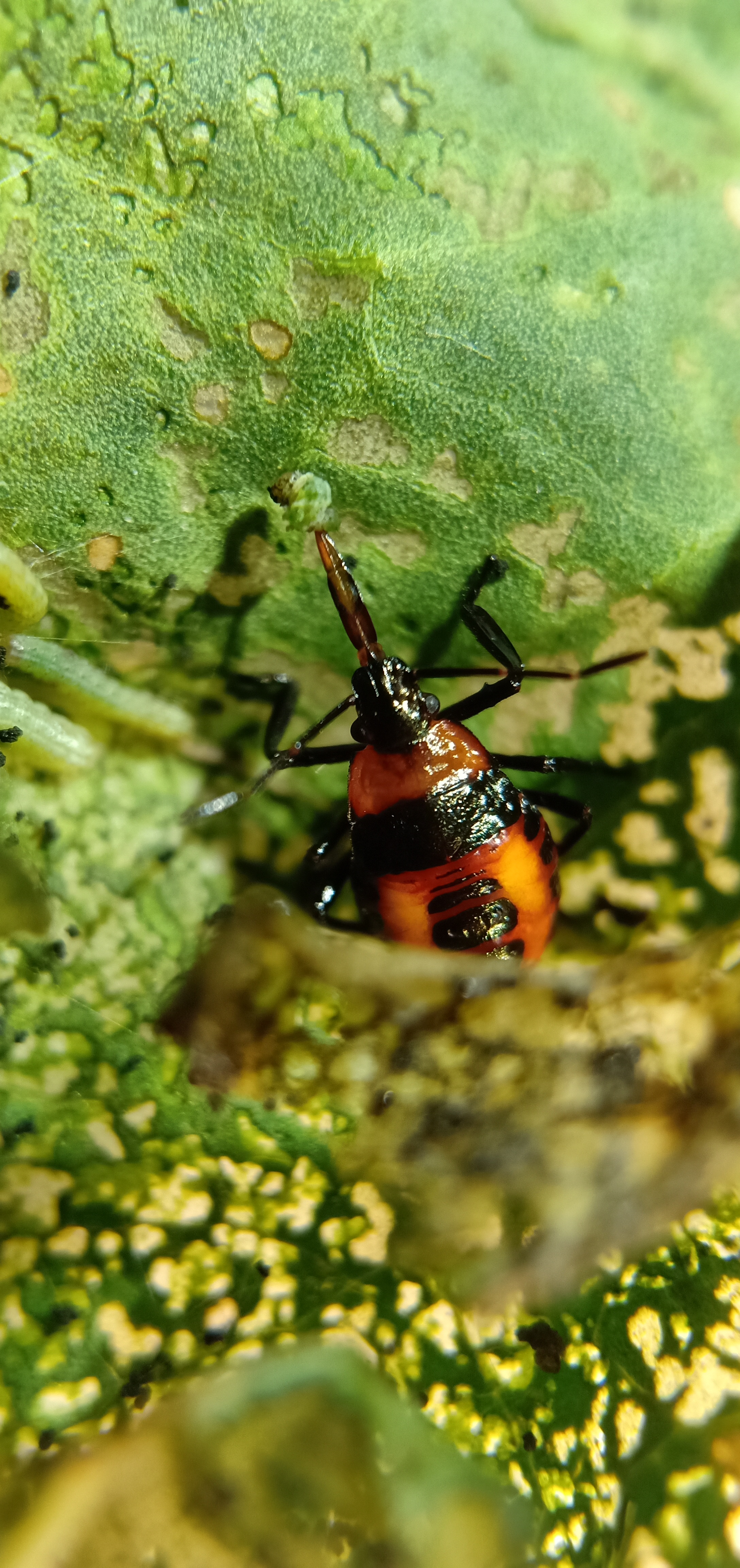
predatory bug of larva infesting castor

So far there are a reported 131 species of natural enemies that prey on S. litura at different points in their life cycle. These include different species of parasites that specifically target either the egg, larval, or pupal stage. There are also 36 species of insect and 12 species of spider that are known to be natural predators to the moths. The identity of these predators vary depending on the region being studied. Additionally, infections from fungi and viruses have been observed. The most commonly reported viruses are nuclear polyhedrosis viruses and granulosis viruses. For example, in Karnataka, a granulosis virus was found in dead S. litura larvae. In this study, both eggs and larvae were susceptible, and the mortality rate ranged from 50% to 100% depending on the stage of the larvae. The older larvae were killed more rapidly than the younger larvae.

=== Chemical signals ===
There are many ways the predators can locate its prey. One way is the release of chemical cues from the larvae that can act as a locator for predators searching for prey. The stink bug Eocanthecona furcellata is a predator that uses these types of chemical signals to locate and attain prey. Its prey locating behavior is activated when exposed to two chemical compounds released by S. litura larvae.

== Host plants ==
S. litura has over 112 host species belonging to over 40 plant families, making the species highly polyphagous. S. litura cause severe damage to their hosts by their vicious eating habits as larvae. Some common host plants include but are not limited to: tobacco, cotton, soybean, beet, cabbage, and chickpeas. When the host plant in a particular area is depleted, big groups of larvae will migrate to find a new food source.

== Interaction with humans ==
=== Pest activity ===
Some external signs of pest activity that can be seen are large holes on leaves, injured stem bases, and discoloration of leaves. Because S. litura acts as a pest on many different kinds of agricultural crops, its presence can cause economic losses in regions where these crops are cultivated. For example, S. litura has been responsible for the 71% yield loss of groundnut in the southern states of India. Another figure shows that S. litura can decrease tobacco yield by 23–50%. This can cause major economic strain since 36 million people are directly or indirectly involved in the production, sale, marketing, or transport of the tobacco crop. The significant impact on agriculture S. litura can have as pests has earned the species a spot on the quarantine list for many countries including the United States of America.

=== Pesticides ===
Due to its presence in many important crops in agriculture, pesticides are always being applied on the species throughout the year. This has caused the rapid evolution of pesticide and insecticide resistance in S. litura. In addition, the sheer amount of pesticides being used have caused concern for pesticide residue on food, environmental damage, and the destruction of beneficial species. Therefore, recent research studies have focused on other biological ways to effectively control these pests. A current study of controlling this pest focuses on using the fungus Nomuraea rileyi on the larval stage of this moth. It was found that spraying a solution of this fungus on larvae in a laboratory setting has led to effective control of the late second and early third instar stages of the larvae on castor crops. When tested in the field, there was a very high larvae mortality of 88–97% 19 days after application of the fungal solution.

== See also ==
- Spodoptera littoralis
- African armyworm (Spodoptera exempta)

== Citations ==
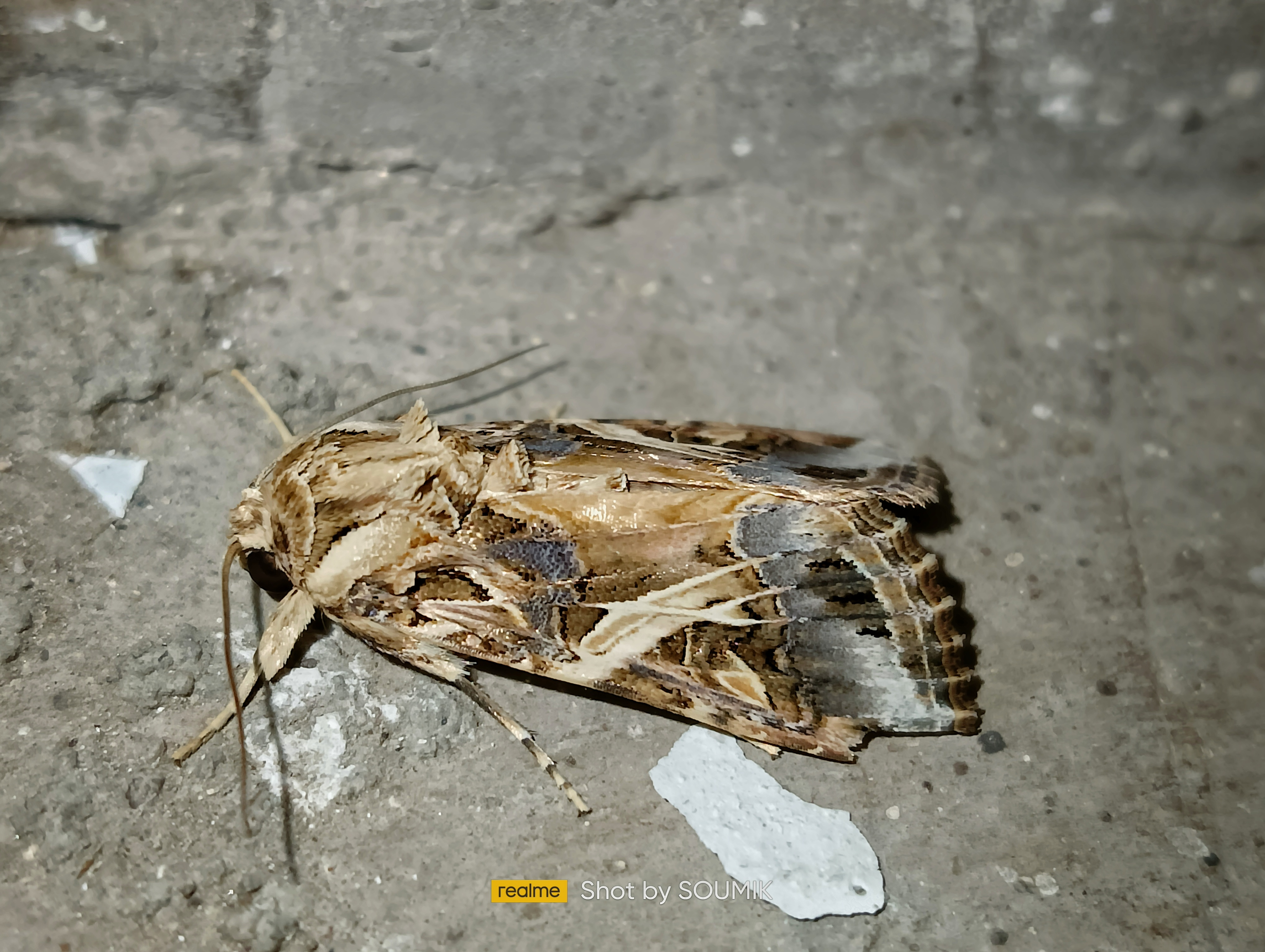
Male
